= Results of the 2024 New South Wales local elections in Outer Sydney =

2024 New South Wales local elections (Outer Sydney)
- 14 September 2024

This is a list of results for the 2024 New South Wales local elections in Outer Sydney including the Central Coast, though the region is considered to be separate from Greater Sydney.

Outer Sydney and surrounds covers 22 local government areas (LGAs) (excluding the Central Coast), including Blue Mountains, Hawkesbury and Wollondilly. A further 10 LGAs are in the Inner Sydney region.

== Blacktown ==
2024 Blacktown City Council election
- 14 September 2024

All 15 seats on Blacktown City Council 8 seats needed for a majority

	First party	Second party	Third party
Party	Labor	Liberal	Greens
Last election	10 seats	3 seats	0 seats
Seats before	10	3	0
Seats won	8	6	1
Seat change	▼2	▲3	▲1
Primary vote	96,925	80,601	20,334
Percentage	47.4%	39.4%	9.9%
Swing	▼5.8%	▲8.4%	▲7.4%
- Results by ward
Largest party before election
Labor
Subsequent largest party
Labor

Blacktown City Council is composed of three wards, each electing five councillors, totalling 15 seats.

=== Blacktown results ===
2024 New South Wales local elections: Blacktown
Party	Votes	%	Swing	Seats	Change
Labor	96,925	47.4	-5.8	8	▼2
Liberal	80,601	39.4	+8.4	6	▲3
Greens	20,334	9.9	+7.4	1	▲1
Animal Justice	6,263	3.1	+3.1	0	Steady
Independents	390	0.2	-11.7	0	▼2
Formal votes	204,513	94.0	+0.5		
Informal votes	12,968	6.0	-0.5		
Total	217,481	100%	N/A	15	
Registered voters / turnout					

=== Ward 1 ===
2024 New South Wales local elections: Ward 1
Party	Candidate	Votes	%	±%
Liberal	1. Jess Diaz (elected 1); 2. Allan Green (elected 3); 3. Rahul Rawal	22,484	48.2	−0.4
Labor	1. Moninderjit Singh (elected 2); 2. Ahalya Rentala; 3. Jordan Hedi	17,217	36.9	−13.4
Greens	1. Shabir Singh; 2. Kayal Rajasekaran; 3. Parker Colborne	6,964	14.9	+13.0
Total formal votes		46,665	95.1	+1.2
Informal votes		2,397	4.9	−1.2
Turnout		49,062	87.9	+1.3

=== Ward 2 ===
2024 New South Wales local elections: Ward 2
Party	Candidate	Votes	%	±%
Liberal	1. Mohit Kumar (elected 1); 2. Damian Milne; 3. Cara Middleton	16,872	41.9	−2.4
Labor	1. Julie Griffiths (elected 2); 2. Kushpinder Kaur; 3. Emma Willis	16,510	41.0	−3.2
Greens	1. Damien Atkins (elected 3); 2. Palaniappan Subramanian; 3. Hannah Tall	6,883	17.1	+5.0
Total formal votes		40,265	94.6	+0.4
Informal votes		2,288	5.4	−0.4
Turnout		42,553	86.1	+0.9

=== Ward 3 ===
2024 New South Wales local elections: Ward 3
Party	Candidate	Votes	%	±%
Labor	1. Carol Israel (elected 1); 2. Susai Benjamin (elected 3); 3. Caitlin Mahony	18,440	48.1	−9.2
Liberal	1. Pradeep Pathi (elected 2); 2. Richard McDonald; 3. Jacob Crews	13,650	35.6	+17.4
Animal Justice	1. Emma Kerin; 2. Ingrid Akkari; 3. Rigel Best	6,263	16.3	+16.3
Total formal votes		38,353	94.3	−0.9
Informal votes		2,308	5.7	+0.9
Turnout		40,661	83.8	+0.2

=== Ward 4 ===
2024 New South Wales local elections: Ward 4
Party	Candidate	Votes	%	±%
Labor	1. Bob Fitzgerald (elected 1); 2. Dorothy Del Villar (elected 3); 3. Shoaib Shams	23,339	59.8	+2.2
Liberal	1. Peter Camilleri (elected 2); 2. Cassandra Mullard; 3. Fiel Santos	15,328	39.2	−0.8
Independent	Maywand Hanifi	390	1.0	+1.0
Total formal votes		39,057	93.1	−0.4
Informal votes		2,906	6.9	+0.4
Turnout		41,963	84.5	−0.1

=== Ward 5 ===
2024 New South Wales local elections: Ward 5
Party	Candidate	Votes	%	±%
Labor	1. Brad Bunting (elected 1); 2. Talia Amituanai (elected 3); 3. Neeraj Duggal	21,419	53.3	−0.6
Liberal	1. Jugandeep Singh (elected 2); 2. Waqar Nasir; 3. Jigishaben Patel	12,267	30.5	+18.0
Greens	1. Talwinder Singh; 2. Len Hobbs; 3. Arif Rahman	6,487	16.1	+16.1
Total formal votes		40,173	92.9	+0.4
Informal votes		3,069	7.1	−0.4
Turnout		43,232	81.3	+2.9

== Burwood ==
2024 Burwood Council election
- 14 September 2024

All 6 seats on Burwood Council (Note: Excluding the mayor, who is directly-elected.) 4 seats needed for a majority

	First party	Second party	Third party
			UNI
Leader	John Faker	David Hull	Guitang Lu
Party	Labor	Liberal	Unity
Last election	3 seats	2 seats	Did not exist
Seats before	3	2	0
Seats won	4	2	0
Seat change	▲1	Steady	Steady
Primary vote	10,387	5,122	1,317
Percentage	61.7%	30.4%	7.8%
Swing	▲9.5	▲6.9	New party
- Results by ward
Largest party before election
Labor
Subsequent largest party
TBD

Burwood Council is composed of six councillors elected proportionally to a single ward, as well as a directly-elected mayor. The Labor Party won a majority at the 2021 election with four seats, including the mayoralty.

The Greens won 12.7% of the vote in 2021 and elected one councillor, Ned Cutcher. He did not seek re-election.

A new party, Australia Multinational Unity Inc (also known simply as "Unity"), contested the election with four candidates.

=== Burwood results ===
2024 New South Wales local elections: Burwood
Party	Candidate	Votes	%	±%
Labor	1. John Faker; 2. George Mannah (elected 1); 3. Pascale Esber (elected 3); 4. Alex Yang (elected 5); 5. Sukirti Bhatta (elected 6); 6. Chris Gray; 7. Victoria Holland	10,387	61.7	+9.5
Liberal	1. Deyi Wu (elected 2); 2. David Hull (elected 4); 3. Raj Dixit	5,122	30.4	+6.9
Unity	1. Guitang Lu; 2. Yi Shen; 3. Hua Yang; 4. Qun Ping Guo	1,317	7.8	+7.8
Total formal votes		16,826	93.4	−1.0
Informal votes		1,129	6.6	+1.0
Turnout		18,018	84.9	−2.1

== Canada Bay ==
2024 Canada Bay City Council election
- 14 September 2024

All 8 seats on Canada Bay City Council 5 seats needed for a majority

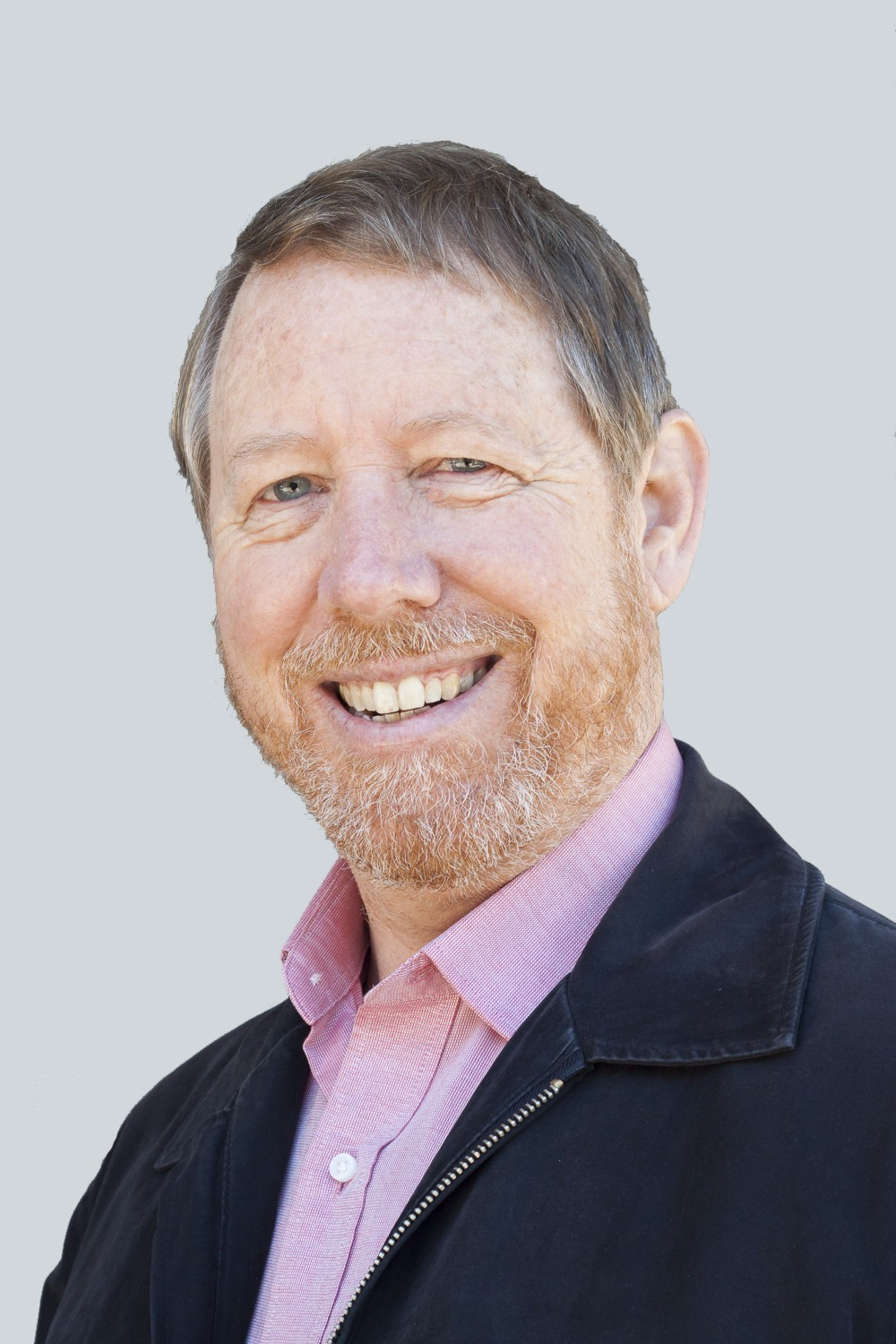

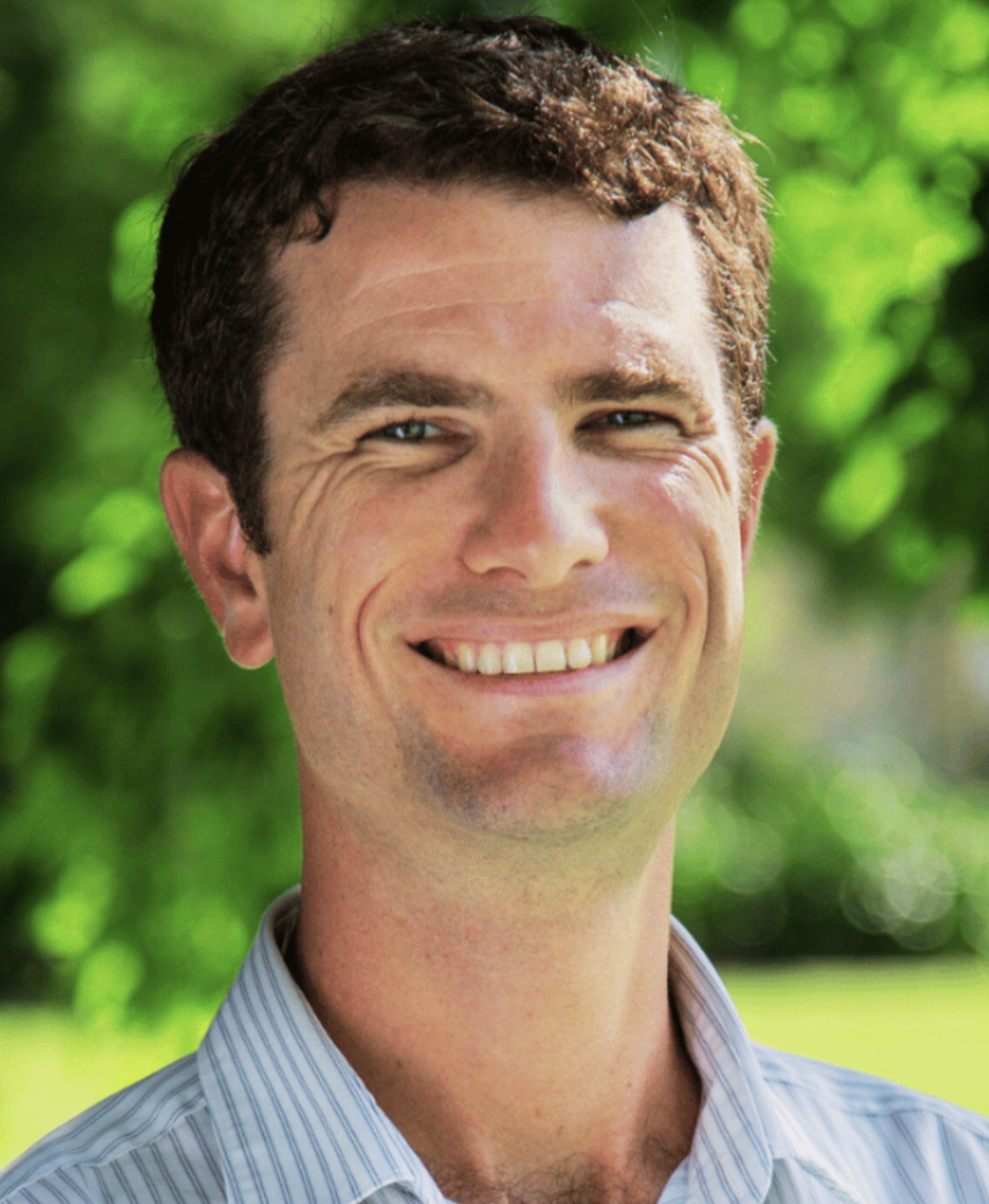
	First party	Second party
Leader	Michael Megna	Andrew Ferguson
Party	Liberal	Labor
Last election	3 seats	2 seats
Seats before	3	2
Seats won	4	3
	Third party	Fourth party
Leader	Charles Jago	Kurt Pudniks
Party	Greens	Libertarian
Last election	1 seat	Did not contest
Seats before	1	0
Seats won	1	0
Largest party before election
Liberal
Subsequent largest party
TBD

Canada Bay City Council is composed of eight councillors elected proportionally to a single ward, as well as a directly-elected mayor. At the 2021 election, both Our Local Community (OLC) and the Liberal Party won three seats (including OLC's Angelo Tsirekas elected as mayor).

On 13 December 2023, Tsirekas was dismissed as mayor by Minister for Local Government Ron Hoenig, one month after the Independent Commission Against Corruption (ICAC) found he had engaged in corrupt conuct. He was banned from civic office for a period of five years. On 25 January 2024, Liberal councillor Michael Megna was appointed by councillors to serve for the remainder of the term.

OLC has chosen not to recontest Canada Bay, with neither of the party's remaining councillors − Joseph Cordaro and Carmela Ruggeri − seeking re-election.

Kurt Pudniks, who ran for the Greens in the Queensland seat of Leichhardt at the 2016 federal election, is contesting for the Libertarian Party as an ungrouped candidate.

=== Canada Bay results ===
2024 New South Wales local elections: Canada Bay
Party	Candidate	Votes	%	±%
Greens	1. Charles Jago (elected 1); 2. Tailoi Ling; 3. Neil Smith; 4. Pauline Tyrrell; 5. Tony Adams	7,836	16.39	+6.59
Labor	1. Andrew Ferguson (elected 2); 2. Maria Cirillo (elected 5); 3. David Mansford (elected 7); 4. Vivek Goyal; 5. Kathryn Zerk; 6. Jessica Handley; 7. Xiaojun Li	18,018	37.70	+8.4
Liberal	1. Michael Megna; 2. Anthony Bazouni (elected 3); 3. Hugo Robinson (elected 4); 4. Eunbong (Sylvia) Lee (elected 6); 5. Mastourah Meuross (elected 8); 6. Chris Burt; 7. Samantha Andreacchio	21,647	45.29	+15.49
Libertarian	Kurt Pudniks	295	0.62	+0.62
Total formal votes		47,796	94.86	−0.54
Informal votes		2,592	5.14	+0.54
Turnout		50,388	85.04	−0.56

== Hornsby ==
2024 Hornsby Shire Council election
- 14 September 2024

All 9 seats on Hornsby Shire Council 6 seats needed for a majority

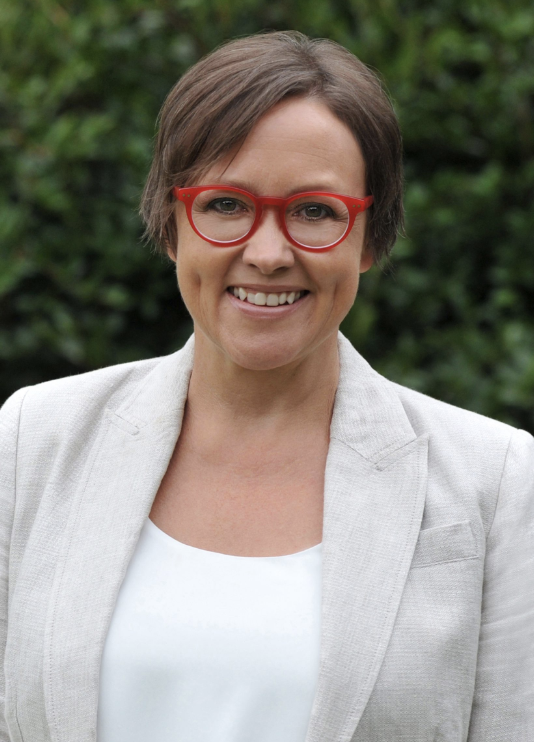

	First party	Second party
Leader	Warren Waddell	Tania Salitra
Party	Liberal	Greens
Last election	6 seats	3 seats
Seats before	4	3
Seats won	4	2
Seat change	Steady	▼1
Primary vote	36,720	18,128
Percentage	44.0%	21.7%
Swing	▼6.2%	▼6.4%
	Third party	Fourth party
		IND
Leader	Janelle McIntosh	N/A
Party	Labor	Independents
Last election	0 seats	0 seats
Seats before	1	1
Seats won	2	1
Seat change	▲1	Steady
Primary vote	15,638	12,876
Percentage	18.8%	15.4%
Swing	▲5.8%	▲7.6
- Results by ward
Largest party before election
Liberal
Subsequent largest party
Liberal

Hornsby Shire Council is composed of three three-member wards, totalling nine councillors, as well as a directly-elected mayor.

In August 2024, A Ward councillor Nathan Tilbury left the Liberal Party.

=== Hornsby results ===
2024 New South Wales local elections: Hornsby
Party	Votes	%	Swing	Seats	Change
Liberal	36,720	44.0	−6.2	4	▼2
Greens	18,128	21.7	−6.4	2	▼1
Labor	15,638	18.8	+5.8	2	▲2
Independents	12,876	15.4	+7.6	1	▲1
Formal votes	83,362	92.9			
Informal votes	6,339	7.1			
Total	89,701			9	
Registered voters / turnout					

=== A Ward ===
2024 New South Wales local elections: A Ward
Party	Candidate	Votes	%	±%
Liberal	1. Warren Waddell (elected mayor); 2. Jane Seaglove (elected 1)	9,892	36.5	−13.9
Independent	1. Nathan Tilbury (elected 2); 2. Kate Friend; 3. Kristie Chambers	8,418	31.1	
Greens	1. Olivia Simons (elected 3); 2. Peter Dickson; 3. David Field	6,563	24.2	+2.0
Labor	Benjamin Goode	2,219	8.2	−9.7
Total formal votes		27,092	88.1	
Informal votes		3,652	11.9	
Turnout		30,744	88.2	

=== B Ward ===
2024 New South Wales local elections: B Ward
Party	Candidate	Votes	%	±%
Liberal	1. Sallianne McClelland (elected 1); 2. Geoffrey Knowles; 3. Grahame Bateman	12,650	44.0	−4.6
Labor	1. Janelle McIntosh (elected 2); 2. Lilith Smart; 3. Rory McClelland	7,664	26.6	+3.2
Greens	1. Monika Ball (elected 3); 2. Matthew Ting; 3. Dana Hatley	5,958	20.7	−7.4
Independent	1. Tom Sellers; 2. Nathan Calder; 3. Milly Scott	2,371	8.2	
Independent	Ilan Weihart	131	0.5	
Total formal votes		28,774	95.1	
Informal votes		1,474	4.9	
Turnout		30,248	86.7	

=== C Ward ===
2024 New South Wales local elections: C Ward
Party	Candidate	Votes	%	±%
Liberal	1. Verity Greenwood (elected 1); 2. Ben McSweeney (elected 2); 3. Samyuta Pillamarri	14,178	51.6	−0.1
Labor	1. Matthew Conley (elected 3); 2. Barbara Taylor; 3. Andrew Macdonald	5,755	20.9	
Greens	1. Tania Salitra; 2. Ana Warnecke; 3. Robyn Wheatley	5,607	20.4	−13.8
Independent	1. Benjamin Caswell; 2. Elizabeth Cardelli; 3. James Rowland	1,739	6.3	
Independent	Harrison Chudleigh	217	0.8	
Total formal votes		27,496	95.8	
Informal votes		1,213	4.2	
Turnout		28,709	88.5	

== Ku-ring-gai ==
2024 Ku-ring-gai Council election
- 14 September 2024

All 10 seats on Ku-ring-gai Council 6 seats needed for a majority
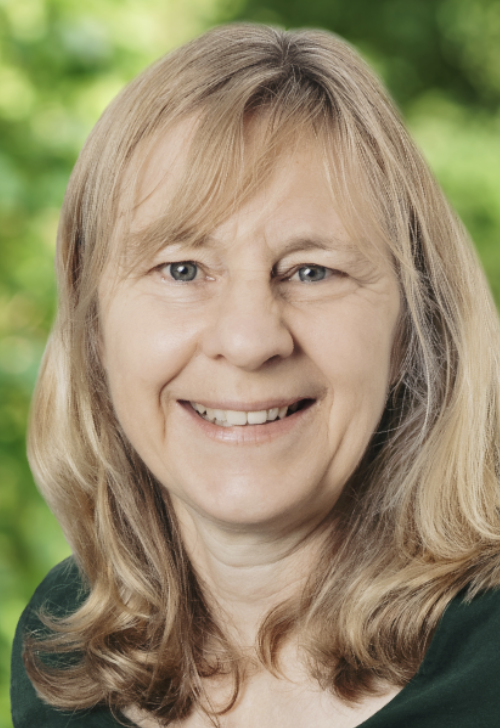

	First party	Second party	Third party
	IND	IND	YVOLI
Leader	N/A	N/A	Sam Ngai
Party	Independents	Ind. Liberal	Your Voice
Last election	6 seats	2 seats	1 seat
Seats before	6	2	1
Seats won	6	3	1
Seat change	Steady	▲1	Steady
Primary vote	33,525	21,188	8,543
Percentage	49.1%	31.1%	12.5%
Swing	▼7.7	▲13.7	▲2.5
	Fourth party	Fifth party	Sixth party
	PKRG
Leader	Simon Lennon	Caroline Atkinson	Parsia Abedini
Party	Preserve KRG	Greens	Labor
Last election	1 seat	Did not contest	Did not contest
Seats before	1	0	0
Seats won	0	0	0
Seat change	▼1	Steady	Steady
Primary vote	2,161	1,753	1,061
Percentage	3.2%	2.6%	1.6%
Swing	▼0.6	New	New
- Results by ward
Largest party before election
Independents
Subsequent largest party
Independents

Ku-ring-gai Council is composed of five two-member wards, totalling 10 councillors.

A number of Independent Liberals are contested the election, while Labor and the Greens endorsed candidates in one ward each. Several local groups also contested.

=== Ku-ring-gai results ===
2024 New South Wales local elections: Ku-ring-gai
Party	Votes	%	Swing	Seats	Change
Independent	33,525	49.1	−7.7	6	Steady
Independent Liberal	21,188	31.1	+13.7	3	▲1
Your Voice On Local Issues	8,543	12.5	+2.5	1	Steady
Preserve Ku-ring-gai	2,161	3.2	−0.6	0	▼1
Greens	1,753	2.6		0	Steady
Labor	1,061	1.6		0	Steady
Formal votes	68,231	94.2			
Informal votes	4,221	5.8			
Total	72,452				

=== Comenarra ===
2024 New South Wales local elections: Comenarra Ward
Party	Candidate	Votes	%	±%
Independent	1. Matt Devlin (elected 1); 2. Beth Scott	3,674	26.9	
Independent	1. Jeff Pettett (elected 2); 2. Helen Easton	3,438	25.1	−13.7
Independent	1. Greg Taylor; 2. Scarlett Ingham	2,555	18.7	−3.4
Independent	1. David Taylor; 2. Catherine Weinress	1,726	12.6	
Independent	1. Adrienne McLean; 2. Dale Crosby	1,230	9.0	
Labor	Parsia Abedini	1,061	7.8	
Total formal votes		13,684	93.3	
Informal votes		986	6.7	
Turnout		14,670	8.7	

=== Gordon ===
2024 New South Wales local elections: Gordon Ward
Party	Candidate	Votes	%	±%
Independent Liberal	1. Barbara Ward (elected 1); 2. Anthony Ching	3,486	24.9	−24.7
Independent	1. Indu Balachandran (elected 2); 2. Johanna Pitman	2,554	18.2	
Preserve Ku-ring-gai	1. Simon Lennon (Ind. Lib); 2. Julia Eagles (Ind.)	2,161	15.4	−3.6
Independent Liberal	1. Jennifer Anderson (Ind. Lib); 2. Michelle Ward (Ind.)	1,920	13.7	
Independent Liberal	1. Henry Song (Ind. Lib); 2. Ji-Sook Kim (Ind. Lib); 3. Ellenor Liu (Ind.)	1,907	13.6	
Independent	1. Sarah Winn; 2. Gavin Burton	1,300	9.3	
Independent	1. Michael Tumulty; 2. Luis Almenara	673	4.8	
Total formal votes		14,001	93.9	
Informal votes		908	6.1	
Turnout		14,909	86.1	

=== Roseville ===
2024 New South Wales local elections: Roseville Ward
Party	Candidate	Votes	%	±%
Your Voice On Local Issues	1. Sam Ngai (Ind. Lib) (elected 1); 2. Kathryn Johnson (Ind.)	8,543	62.2	+12.4
Independent	1. Alec Taylor (elected 2); 2. Deidre Bhomer	3,444	25.1	+1.1
Greens	1. Caroline Atkinson; 2. Robyn Thomas	1,753	12.8	
Total formal votes		13,740	96.1	
Informal votes		556	3.9	
Turnout		14,296	85.8	

=== St Ives ===
2024 New South Wales local elections: St Ives Ward
Party	Candidate	Votes	%	±%
Independent	1. Martin Smith (elected 1); 2. Leigh Falinski	6,122	45.5	−4.6
Independent Liberal	1. Christine Kay (elected 2); 2. Michael French	4,868	36.2	+14.9
Independent Liberal	1. Andrew Cheng (Ind. Lib); 2. Lisa Elliott (Ind.)	2,241	16.7	
Independent	Nades Nadeswaran	228	1.7	
Total formal votes		13,459	93.0	
Informal votes		1,018	7.0	
Turnout		14,477	87.2	

=== Wahroonga ===
2024 New South Wales local elections: Wahroonga Ward
Party	Candidate	Votes	%	±%
Independent Liberal	1. Cedric Spencer (Ind. Lib) (elected 1); 2. Wendy McKasah (Ind.); 3. Tony Pang (Ind.)	4,238	31.8	
Independent	1. Kim Wheatley (elected 2); 2. Jennifer Rufati	3,277	24.6	
Independent Liberal	1. Jack Abadee (Ind. Lib); 2. Reid Brown (Ind.)	2,528	18.9	
Independent	1. Kristyn Haywood; 2. Julian Sayyadi	2,305	17.3	
Independent	1. Jaimie Gordon; 2. Sheridan Evans	999	7.5	
Total formal votes		13,347	94.7	
Informal votes		753	5.3	
Turnout		14,100	87.1	

== Ryde ==
2024 Ryde City Council election
- 14 September 2024

All 12 seats on Ryde City Council 7 seats needed for a majority

	First party	Second party	Third party
Leader	Trenton Brown	Bernard Purcell	None
Party	Liberal	Labor	Greens
Last election	6 seats	5 seats	0 seats
Seats before	7	4	0
Seats won	7	3	1
Seat change	Steady	▼1	▲1
Primary vote	28,550	18,853	5,257
Percentage	44.1%	29.1%	8.1%
Swing	▲8.9	▼6.8	▼2.7
- Results by ward
Largest party before election
Liberal
Subsequent largest party
Liberal

Ryde City Council is composed of three four-member wards, totalling 12 councillors, as well as − starting at the 2024 election − a directly-elected mayor.

The Liberal Party won a plurality with six seats in 2021, before gaining a majority in October 2022 after winning the West Ward by-election following Labor councillor Jerome Laxale's resignation.

=== Ryde results ===
2024 New South Wales local elections: Ryde
Party	Votes	%	Swing	Seats	Change
Liberal	28,550	44.1	+8.9	7	▲1
Labor	18,853	29.1	−6.8	3	▼2
Roy Maggio Independents	11,405	17.6		1	Steady
Greens	5,257	8.1	−2.7	1	▲1
Peter Kim Independent Team	1,663	2.6		0	Steady
Unity	842	1.3		0	Steady
Formal votes	64,790	93.9			
Informal votes	4,235	6.1			
Total	69,025				

=== Central ===
2024 New South Wales local elections: Central Ward
Party	Candidate	Votes	%	±%
Liberal	1. Shweta Deshpande (elected 1); 2. Daniel Han (elected 3); 3. Armen Arakelian; 4. Madison Lane	9,263	42.8	+5.7
Labor	1. Lyndal Howison (elected 2); 2. Milo Kuga; 3. Bailey Linton-Simpkins; 4. Kathleen Powell	6,058	28.0	−9.7
Greens	1. Tina Kordrostami (elected 4); 2. Cosmin Luca; 3. Nicholas Grinter-Cummins; 4. John Brown	3,477	16.1	+3.5
Roy Maggio Independents	1. Nicole Rizk; 2. Louis George; 3. Meray Hajjar; 4. Jennifer Rizk	2,857	13.2	
Total formal votes		21,655	94.0	−1.7
Informal votes		1,377	6.0	+1.7
Turnout		23,032	85.3	−0.2

=== East ===
2024 New South Wales local elections: East Ward
Party	Candidate	Votes	%	±%
Liberal	1. Trenton Brown (elected mayor); 2. Sophie Lara-Watson (elected 1); 3. Keanu Arya (elected 4); 4. Jeannette Oujani	8,493	38.3	+3.6
Labor	1. Penny Pedersen (elected 2); 2. Nasrin Azizi; 3. James Jelly; 4. Christopher Rutter	7,072	31.9	+1.9
Roy Maggio Independents	1. Roy Maggio (elected 3); 2. Greg Chippendale; 3. Efi Krimizis; 4. Lina Candy	6,600	29.8	+5.7
Total formal votes		22,165	93.8	−2.3
Informal votes		1,468	6.2	+2.3
Turnout		23,633	86.0	−1.7

=== West ===
2024 New South Wales local elections: West Ward
Party	Candidate	Votes	%	±%
Liberal	1. Justin Li (elected 1); 2. Kathy Tracey (elected 3); 3. Cameron Last (elected 4); 4. Deepak Chauhan	10,794	51.5	+17.7
Labor	1. Felix Lo (elected 2); 2. Bec Cooke; 3. Edwin Ho; 4. Geoffrey Lee	5,723	27.3	−13.1
Roy Maggio Independents	1. Karen Alden; 2. Michelle Prasad; 3. Philip Brown; 4. Michelle Edwards	1,948	9.3	
Peter Kim Independent Team	1. Peter Kim; 2. May Mak; 3. Glenn Pearce; 4. Crystal Tisseverasinghe	1,663	7.9	−2.4
Unity	1. Angela Jia; 2. Bing Zhang; 3. Shao Wu; 4. Jiaxi Li	842	4.0	
Total formal votes		20,970	93.8	−2.0
Informal votes		1,390	6.2	+2.0
Turnout		22,360	86.9	−0.3

== Strathfield ==
2024 Strathfield Council election
- 14 September 2024

All 7 seats on Strathfield Council 4 seats needed for a majority

	First party	Second party
Leader	John-Paul Baladi	Rory Nosworthy
Party	Liberal	Labor
Last election	Did not contest	3 seats
Seats before	1	3
Seats won	3	2
Seat change	▲2	▼1
Primary vote	6,912	6,107
Percentage	35.11%	31.02%
Swing	New	▼11.78
	Third party	Fourth party
	SI	BCIT
Leader	Matthew Blackmore	Benjamin Cai
Party	Strathfield Inds	BCIT
Last election	2 seats	1 seat
Seats before	1	2
Seats won	1	1
Seat change	Steady	▼1
Primary vote	3,401	2,980
Percentage	17.28	15.14%
Swing	▼3.82	▲5.14 (Note: Compared to the Benjamin Cai Independent Team (BCIT) vote total at the 2021 election, Compared to the BCIT and NHI combined 2021 vote total, BCIT has a decrease of 16.96%.)
- Results by ward
Largest party before election
Labor
Subsequent largest party
Liberal

Strathfield Council is composed of seven councillors elected proportionally to a single ward.

In February 2024, Strathfield Independents councillor Sandy Reddy joined the Liberal Party. Nella Hall Independents did not recontest the election, with Nella Hall instead running second on the "Benjamin Cai Independent Team" ticket.

=== Strathfield results ===
2024 New South Wales local elections: Strathfield
Party	Candidate	Votes	%	±%
Liberal	1. John-Paul Baladi (elected 3); 2. Sandy Reddy (elected 5); 3. Hye Young (Esther) Kim (elected 7); 4. Satvik Sharma	6,912	35.11	+35.11
Labor	1. Rory Nosworthy (elected 4); 2. Karen Pensabene (elected 6); 3. Raj Datta; 4. Elizabeth Wang; 5. Joshua Kolesnikoff; 6. Steven Du; 7. Anne Sullivan	6,107	31.02	−11.78
Strathfield Independents	1. Matthew Blackmore (elected 2); 2. Dong (Robin) Ma; 3. Andrew Soulos; 4. Anna Edwards; 5. Adam Smith; 6. Dale Brett Ford; 7. Helen Apostle	3,401	17.28	−3.82
Benjamin Cai & Nella Hall Independent Group	1. Benjamin Cai (elected 1); 2. Nella Hall; 3. Yakub Can; 4. Patricia Giammarco; 5. Chi Zhang; 6. Sabitri Kafle	2,980	15.14	−16.96
Independent	Sarath Pamidiparthi	261	1.33	+1.33
Independent	Mario Orlovic	26	0.13	+0.13
Total formal votes		19,687	94.85	
Informal votes		1,067	5.15	
Turnout		20,754		

== Sutherland ==
2024 Sutherland Shire Council election
- 14 September 2024

All 15 councillors on Sutherland Shire Council 8 seats needed for a majority

	First party	Second party
Leader	N/A	Jack Boyd
Party	Liberal	Labor
Last election	8 seats	5 seats
Seats before	6	5
Seats won	6	5
Seat change	Steady	Steady
Primary vote	58,293	43,831
Percentage	40.5%	30.5%
Swing	▼4.5	▼0.9
- Results by ward
Largest party before election
Liberal
Subsequent largest party
Liberal

Sutherland Shire Council is composed of five three-member wards, totalling 15 councillors. At the 2021 election, the Liberals won a majority with eight seats.

A Ward councillor Leanne Farmer, who led the "Genuine Community Independents" group in 2021, is leading the "Shire Independents" group, which is contesting three wards. E Ward councillor Laura Cowell, previously the leader of "Shire Sports Independents", is contesting as an independent. (Note: Although Laura Cowell led "Shire Sports Independents" in 2021, she also held the "Shire Independents" ABN until 16 November 2023. Another separate group, called "Shire Independents Group", was led by Tony Robins in 2021.)

In August 2024, A Ward councillor Carol Provan and C Ward councillor Carmelo Pesce lost Liberal Party preselection, with both resigning from the party as a result. Both were re-elected as independents.

=== Sutherland results ===
2024 New South Wales local elections: Sutherland
Party	Votes	%	Swing	Seats	Change
Liberal	58,293	40.51%		6	
Labor	43,831	30.46%		5	
Shire Independents	9,345	6.49%		0	
Greens	3,207	2.23%		0	
The Passmore Independents	2,622	1.82%		0	
Libertarian	2,217	1.54%		0	
Animal Justice	1,486	1.03%		0	
Independents	22,901	15.91%		4	
Formal votes	143,902	94.97%			
Informal votes	7,617	5.03%			
Total	151,519			15	
Registered voters / turnout					

=== A Ward ===
2024 New South Wales local elections: A Ward
Party	Candidate	Votes	%	±%
Liberal	1. Marcelle Elzerman (elected 1); 2. Daniel Rindfleish; 3. Nicholas Mickovski	9,151	32.52%	
Independent	1. Kal Glanznig (elected 2); 2. Patch Clunes; 3. Mark Aprilovic	6,338	22.52%	
Independent	1. Carol Provan (elected 3); 2. Ross Howie; 3. Julie Muir	4,310	15.31%	
Labor	1. Jeremy Gadsden; 2. Sienna Forrest; 3. Norbert Schaeper	3,960	14.07%	
Shire Independents	1. Leanne Farmer; 2. Brielle Streater; 3. Robert Green	2,898	10.30%	
Animal Justice	1. Dianne Becker; 2. Gavin Conibeer; 3. Natasha Brown	1,486	5.28%	
Total formal votes		28,143		
Informal votes		1,439		
Turnout		29,582		

=== B Ward ===
2024 New South Wales local elections: B Ward
Party	Candidate	Votes	%	±%
Liberal	1. Melanie Gibbons (elected 1); 2. Joanne Nicholls (elected 3); 3. Princess Kristo	13,681	46.36%	
Labor	1. Jack Boyd (elected 2); 2. Rosemary Maker; 3. Jeremy Ison	8,976	30.42%	
Shire Independents	1. Allira Wade; 2. Lorna Genoud; 3. William Beukes	3,644	12.35%	
Greens	1. Martin Moore; 2. Angus Dyson; 3. Sylvia Speranza	3,207	10.87%	
Total formal votes		29,508		
Informal votes		1,382		
Turnout		30,890		

=== C Ward ===
2024 New South Wales local elections: C Ward
Party	Candidate	Votes	%	±%
Liberal	1. Haris Strangas (elected 2); 2. Kyriakos Panayi; 3. Diane McInerney	12,056	42.13%	
Labor	1. Jen Armstrong (elected 1); 2. Amadene Edwards; 3. Graeme Patterson	9,017	31.51%	
Independent	1. Carmelo Pesce (elected 3); 2. John Mannah; 3. David Brownhill	5,324	18.61%	
Libertarian	1. Gaye Cameron; 2. Mark Preston; 3. Kathryn Rikkerrink	2,217	7.75%	
Total formal votes		28,614		
Informal votes		1,803		
Turnout		30,417		

=== D Ward ===
2024 New South Wales local elections: D Ward
Party	Candidate	Votes	%	±%
Labor	1. Diedree Steinwall (elected 1); 2. Peter Tsambalas (elected 3); 3. Hayden Sloggett	13,077	44.53%	
Liberal	1. Meredith Laverty (elected 2); 2. Troy Loveday; 3. Daniel Padman	10,117	34.45%	
Shire Independents	1. Mark Christie; 2. Robert Jenkins; 3. Robert Sheargold	2,803	9.54%	
The Passmore Independents	1. Dominique Passmore; 2. Tania Clynch; 3. Anne Passmore	2,622	8.93%	
Independent	1. Brady Clarke; 2. James Hankins; 3. Dennis Bartolotta	749	2.55%	
Total formal votes		29.368		
Informal votes		1,647		
Turnout		31,015		

=== E Ward ===
2024 New South Wales local elections: E Ward
Party	Candidate	Votes	%	±%
Liberal	1. Stephen Nikolovski (elected 2); 2. Dolores Gonsalves; 3. James Young	13,288	47.01%	
Labor	1. Mick Maroney (elected 1); 2. Jennifer McDonald; 3. Nathan McMillan	8,801	31.13%	
Independent	1. Laura Cowell (elected 3); 2. Emma Jeffrey; 3. Matthew Brady	6,180	21.86%	
Total formal votes		28,269		
Informal votes		1,346		
Turnout		29,615		

== The Hills ==
2024 The Hills Shire Council election
- 14 September 2024

All 12 seats on The Hills Shire Council 7 seats needed for a majority

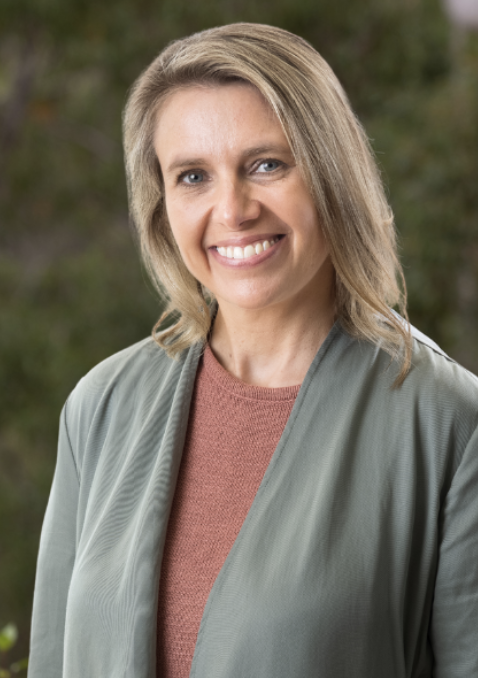
	First party	Second party	Third party
Leader	Michelle Byrne	Immanuel Selvaraj	Mila Kasby
Party	Liberal	Labor	Greens
Last election	8 seats	3 seats	1 seat
Seats before	8	3	1
Seats won	8	3	1
Seat change	Steady	Steady	Steady
Primary vote	68,058	25,945	15,237
Percentage	61.3	23.4%	13.7%
Swing	▲0.7	▲2.8	▼3.1
- Results by ward
Largest party before election
Liberal
Subsequent largest party
Liberal

The Hills Shire Council is composed of four three-member wards, as well as a directly-elected mayor. At the 2021 election, the Liberals won a majority with nine seats, including the mayoralty.

=== The Hills results ===
2024 New South Wales local elections: The Hills
Party	Votes	%	Swing	Seats	Change
Liberal	68,058	61.3	+0.7	8	Steady
Labor	25,945	23.4	+2.8	3	Steady
Greens	15,237	13.7	−3.1	1	Steady
Independents	1,795	1.6	−0.3	0	Steady
Formal votes	111,035	95.0			
Informal votes	5,865	5.0			
Total	116,900				

=== Central ===
2024 New South Wales local elections: Central Ward
Party	Candidate	Votes	%	±%
Liberal	1. Reena Jethi (elected 1); 2. Jerome Cox (elected 2); 3. Manjula Viswanath	16,667	59.3	−0.5
Labor	1. Tina Cartwright (elected 3); 2. Gurdip Singh; 3. Cheung Chai	6,727	23.9	+0.7
Greens	1. Danielle Packer; 2. Samuel Hughes; 3. Seyed Hosseinipour	4,342	15.5	0.0
Independent	Raymond Brown	360	1.3	
Total formal votes		28,096	95.4	
Informal votes		1362	4.4	
Turnout		29,458	87.7	

=== East ===
2024 New South Wales local elections: East Ward
Party	Candidate	Votes	%	±%
Liberal	1. Samuel Uno (elected 1); 2. Alan Haselden (elected 2); 3. Leo Wei	15,543	56.4	+2.6
Labor	1. Jane Grevtseva (elected 3); 2. Andrew Punch; 3. Senthil Sundararajan	6,339	23.0	−7.5
Greens	1. Suzannah McDonald; 2. Catherine Woolnough; 3. Tian Wong See	5,676	20.6	+6.8
Total formal votes		27,558	95.9	
Informal votes		1,174	4.1	
Turnout		28,732	86.5	

=== North ===
2024 New South Wales local elections: North Ward
Party	Candidate	Votes	%	±%
Liberal	1. Mitchell Blue (elected 1); 2. Jacob Jackson (elected 2); 3. Brooke Collins	18,494	63.9	−7.7
Labor	1. Dilvan Bircan; 2. Bassam Sheikh; 3. Kaitlyn Farquhar	5,220	18.0	
Greens	1. Mila Kasby (elected 3); 2. Vida Shahamat; 3. Rebecca Oliveira	5,219	18.0	−7.1
Total formal votes		28,933	95.2	
Informal votes		1,447	4.8	
Turnout		30,380	88.7	

=== West ===
2024 New South Wales local elections: West Ward
Party	Candidate	Votes	%	±%
Liberal	1. Frank De Masi (elected 1); 2. Rosemarie Boneham (elected 3); 3. Trent Richmond	17,354	60.9	+5.5
Labor	1. Immanuel Selvaraj (elected 2); 2. Sook Lee; 3. Lachland Newland	7,659	34.1	+4.1
Independent	Seema Raghav	1,435	5.0	
Total formal votes		28,504	93.8	
Informal votes		1,882	6.2	
Turnout		30,386	87.9	

== Wollondilly ==
2024 Wollondilly Shire Council election
- 14 September 2024

All 9 seats on Wollondilly Shire Council 5 seats needed for a majority
- Registered: 42,078
- Mayor
- Turnout: 87.08% (▼2.57)
	First party	Second party	Third party
		ETL	TP
Candidate	Matt Gould	Benn Banasik	Paul Rogers
Party	Matt Gould Team	Experienced	Team Purple
Primary vote	21,413	5,464	5,439
Percentage	62.68%	15.99%	15.92%
Swing	▲39.22	▲4.44	▲15.92
TCP	78.12%		21.88%
TCP swing	▲78.12		▼21.88
Mayor before election
Matt Gould
Matt Gould Team
Elected Mayor
Matt Gould
Matt Gould Team
- Councillors
Party	Leader	Vote %	Seats	+/–
Matt Gould Team	Matt Gould	46.9	4	
Experienced To Lead	Benn Banasik	19.8	2	
Independents	N/A	16.2	1	
Team Purple	Paul Rogers	11.1	1	
This lists parties that won seats. See the complete results below.
Results by ward

Wollondilly Shire Council is composed of two four-member wards and a directly-elected mayor.

=== Wollondilly mayor ===
2024 New South Wales mayoral elections: Wollondilly
Party	Candidate	Votes	%	±%
Matt Gould Team	Matt Gould	21,413	62.68	+39.22
Experienced To Lead	Benn Banasik	5,464	15.99	+4.44
Team Purple	Paul Rogers	5,439	15.92	+15.92
Bev Spearpoint Team	Bev Spearpoint	1,845	5.40	+5.40
Total formal votes		34,161	93.22	–1.78
Informal votes		2,483	6.78	+1.78
Turnout		36,644	87.08	–2.57
Two-candidate-preferred result
Matt Gould Team	Matt Gould	22,417	78.12	+24.64
Team Purple	Paul Rogers	6,278	21.88	+21.88
Matt Gould Team hold				

=== Wollondilly results ===
2024 New South Wales local elections: Wollondilly
Party	Votes	%	Swing	Seats	Change
Matt Gould Team	15,270	46.9		4	
Experienced To Lead	6,438	19.8		2	
Team Purple	3,611	11.1		1	
Independent Liberal	1,101	3.4		0	
Bev Spearpoint Team	849	2.6		0	
Independents	5,274	16.2		1	
Formal votes	32,543	88.9			
Informal votes	4,080	11.1			
Total	36,623			8	
Registered voters / turnout					

=== East ===
2024 New South Wales local elections: East Ward
Party	Candidate	Votes	%	±%
Matt Gould Team	1. Suzy Brandstater (elected 1); 2. Michael Moxon; 3. Anna Bunga; 4. Tia Teech	4,567	27.3	+13.9
Independent	1. Matt Deeth (elected 2); 2. Diaan Nasser; 3. Ren Moolhuyzen; 4. Ray Sleeth; 5. Christine Neilsen	4,219	25.2	+3.8
Team Purple	1. Paul Rogers (elected 3); 2. Pam Browne; 3. Nicole Pearce; 4. Michelle Maroun; 5. Matt Hale	3,611	21.6	−5.8
Experienced To Lead	1. Benn Banasik (elected 4); 2. Sam Davis; 3. Alex Hawkins; 4. Alex Belanszky; 5. Joe Quilter	3,229	19.3	+3.5
Independent Liberal	1. Aaron Colley (Ind. Lib); 2. Christopher Quinlan (Ind. Lib); 3. Alana Dell (Ind. Lib); 4. Mitchell Jurd (Ind.)	1,101	6.6	
Total formal votes		16,727	87.8	
Informal votes		2,326	12.2	
Turnout		19,053	86.8	

=== North ===
2024 New South Wales local elections: North Ward
Party	Candidate	Votes	%	±%
Matt Gould Team	1. Matt Gould (elected mayor); 2. Hilton Gibbs (elected 1); 3. Jacqueline Jenson (elected 3); 4. Trish Hill (elected 4); 5. Blair Briggs	10,703	67.7	+18.7
Experienced To Lead	1. Alison Dench (elected 2); 2. Maddy Phillips; 3. Karl Klein; 4. Maree Mullins; 5. Ken Rudd	3,209	20.3	
Independent	1. John Van De Putte; 2. Rheya Mason; 3. Teonie Mitchell; 4. Fotios (Frank) Davlouros; 5. Luke Reeves	1,055	6.7	
Bev Spearpoint Team	1. Bev Spearpoint; 2. Christopher Edwards; 3. Elizabeth Berg; 4. Lauren Heydon	849	5.4	−4.1
Total formal votes		15,816	90.0	
Informal votes		1,754	10.0	
Turnout		17,570	87.3	
