= Results of the 2021 New South Wales local elections in Inner Sydney =

2021 New South Wales local elections (Inner Sydney)
← 2016 ← 2017	4 December 2021	2024 →

This is a list of results for the 2021 New South Wales local elections in the Inner Sydney region.

Inner Sydney covers 10 local government areas (LGAs), including the City of Sydney. A further 23 LGAs are in Outer Sydney and surrounding regions.

== Bayside ==
The Liberal Party did not endorse any candidates, including its five councillors elected in 2017.

2021 New South Wales local elections: Bayside
Party	Votes	%	Swing	Seats	Change
Labor	37,157	45.7	−0.3	7	Steady
Independent	22,563	27.8	+7.8	4	▲1
Independent Liberal	7,564	9.3	−17.9 (Note: Compared with the Liberal Party result at the 2017 election.)	2	▼5
Peaceful Bayside	3,015	3.7		1	▲1
Greens	10,969	13.5	+6.8	1	▲1
Formal votes	81,268				

=== Ward 1 ===
Elected councillor	Party
Christina Curry	Labor
Scott Morrissey	Labor
Jennifer Muscat	Independent (Group A)

2021 New South Wales local elections: Ward 1
Party	Candidate	Votes	%	±%
	Labor	10,496	60.4	
	Independent (Group A)	2,807	16.2	
	Independent (Group D)	2,165	12.5	
	Greens	1,911	11.0	
Total formal votes		17,379	94.2	
Informal votes		1,070	5.8	
Turnout			82.7	

=== Ward 2 ===
Elected councillor	Party
Jo Jansyn	Labor
Ann Fardell	Labor
Michael Nagi	Ind. Liberal

2021 New South Wales local elections: Ward 2
Party	Candidate	Votes	%	±%
	Labor	9,164	53.4	
	Independent Liberal	3,173	18.5	
	Greens	3,169	18.5	
	Independent (Group C)	1,662	9.7	
Total formal votes		17,168	94.2	
Informal votes		1,064	5.8	
Turnout			80.4	

=== Ward 3 ===
Elected councillor	Party
Cr. Bill Saravinovski	Labor
Greta Werner	Greens
Andrew Tsounis	Independent (Group D)

2021 New South Wales local elections: Ward 3
Party	Candidate	Votes	%	±%
	Labor	6,494	42.7	
	Greens	3,459	22.7	
	Independent (Group D)	2,935	19.3	
	Independent (Group A)	2,324	15.3	
Total formal votes		15,212	92.7	
Informal votes		1,202	7.3	
Turnout			83.2	

=== Ward 4 ===
Elected councillor	Party
Liz Barlow	Independent
Mark Hanna	Independent
Joe Awada	Labor

2021 New South Wales local elections: Ward 4
Party	Candidate	Votes	%	±%
	Independent (Group A)	7,412	44.9	
	Labor	6,677	40.4	
	Greens	2,430	14.7	
Total formal votes		16,519	93.0	
Informal votes		1,239	7.0	
Turnout			85.8	

=== Ward 5 ===
Elected councillor	Party
Edward McDougall	Labor
Heidi Douglas	Peaceful Bayside
Paul Sedrak	Ind. Liberal

2021 New South Wales local elections: Ward 5
Party	Candidate	Votes	%	±%
Independent Liberal		4,347	29.0	
Labor		4,326	28.9	
Peaceful Bayside		3,015	20.1	
Independent (Group E)		2,487	16.1	
Independent (Group D)		771	5.1	
Independent Liberal	Ron Bezic	44	0.3	
Total formal votes		14,990	91.5	
Informal votes		1,398	8.5	
Turnout			84.4	

== Hunter's Hill ==
2021 New South Wales local elections: Hunter's Hill
Party	Votes	%	Swing	Seats	Change
Independent	3,372	41.0		3	
Liberal	3,171	38.5	+2.1	3	
Team Ross	1,260	15.3		1	
Greens	431	5.2	+5.2	0	Steady
Formal votes	8,234	96.33			
Informal votes	314	3.67			
Total	8,548	100.00			

=== North ===
Elected councillor	Party
Julia Prieston	Liberal
Ross Williams	Team Ross
Elizabeth Krassoi	Independent (Group A)

2021 New South Wales local elections: North Ward
Party	Candidate	Votes	%	±%
	Liberal	1,576	37.8	
	Team Ross	1,260	30.2	
	Independent (Group A)	960	23.0	
	Independent (Group B)	376	9.0	
Total formal votes		4,172	95.6	
Informal votes		193	4.4	
Turnout		4,365	85.9	

=== South ===
Elected councillor	Party
Tatyana Virgara	Liberal
Richard Quinn	Independent (Group F)
Jim Sanderson	Independent (Group B)

2021 New South Wales local elections: South Ward
Party	Candidate	Votes	%	±%
	Liberal	1,595	39.3	
	Independent (Group F)	859	21.1	
	Independent (Group B)	848	20.9	
	Greens	431	10.6	+10.6
	Independent (Group D)	263	6.5	
	Independent (Group C)	66	1.6	
Total formal votes		4,062	97.1	
Informal votes		121	2.9	
Turnout		4,183	86.5	

== Inner West ==
The Liberal Party did not endorse any candidates, including its two councillors elected in 2017.

2021 New South Wales local elections: Inner West
Party	Votes	%	Swing	Seats	Change
Labor	40,113	38.6	+4.7	8	▲3
Greens	37,499	36.0	+7.2	5	Steady
Independent	15,967	15.3	−2.7	2	▼1
Independent Liberal	6,738	6.5	−11.1 (Note: Compared with the Liberal Party result at the 2017 election.)	0	▼2
Community Independents	1,195	1.1		0	Steady
Community Independent	898	0.9		0	Steady
Animal Justice	876	0.8	+0.8	0	Steady
Socialist Alliance	749	0.8	–0.2	0	Steady
Formal votes	104,035	96.49			
Informal votes	3,795	3.51			
Total	107,830	100.00			

=== Ashfield–Djarrawunang ===
Elected councillor	Party
Mark Drury	Labor
Dylan Griffiths	Greens
Jessica D'Arienzo	Labor

2021 New South Wales local elections: Ashfield–Djarrawunang (Magpie) Ward
Party	Candidate	Votes	%	±%
	Labor	8,294	38.9	
	Greens	7,726	36.3	
	Independent	2,243	20.5	
	Independent Liberal	1,852	8.7	
	Community Independents	1,195	5.6	
Total formal votes		21,310	95.9	
Informal votes		904	4.1	
Turnout		22,214	83.7	

=== Balmain–Baludarri ===
Elected councillor	Party
Darcy Byrne	Labor
Kobi Shetty	Greens
John Stamolis	Independent

2021 New South Wales local elections: Balmain–Baludarri (Leather Jacket) Ward
Party	Candidate	Votes	%	±%
	Labor	7,751	36.5	
	Greens	7,220	34.0	
	Independent	3,814	18.0	
	Independent Liberal	1,557	7.3	
	Community Independent	898	4.2	
Total formal votes		21,240	97.5	
Informal votes		555	2.5	
Turnout		21,795	81.2	

=== Leichhardt–Gulgadya ===
Elected councillor	Party
Philippa Scott	Labor
Marghanita Da Cruz	Greens
Tim Stephens	Labor

2021 New South Wales local elections: Leichhardt–Gulgadya (Grass Tree) Ward
Party	Candidate	Votes	%	±%
	Labor	8,200	39.5	
	Greens	7,508	36.1	
	Independent Liberal	3,329	16.0	
	Animal Justice	876	+4.2	+4.2
	Independent	870	4.2	
Total formal votes		20,783	95.8	
Informal votes		900	4.2	
Turnout		21,683	83.2	

=== Marrickville–Midjuburi ===
Elected councillor	Party
Mat Howard	Labor
Justine Langford	Greens
Zoi Tsardoulias	Labor

2021 New South Wales local elections: Marrickville–Midjuburi (Lillypilly) Ward
Party	Candidate	Votes	%	±%
	Labor	8,905	43.8	
	Greens	7,293	35.8	
	Independent	4,149	20.4	
Total formal votes		20,347	96.5	
Informal votes		731	3.5	
Turnout		21,078	80.4	

=== Stanmore–Damun ===
Elected councillor	Party
Liz Atkins	Greens
Chloe Smith	Labor
Pauline Lockie	Independent

2021 New South Wales local elections: Stanmore–Damun (Port Jackson Fig) Ward
Party	Candidate	Votes	%	±%
Greens		7,752	38.1	
Labor		6,963	34.2	
Independent		4,634	22.8	
Socialist Alliance		749	3.7	
Independent	Daniel Ribarovski	257	1.3	
Total formal votes		20,355	96.7	
Informal votes		705	3.3	
Turnout		21,060	78.9	

== Sydney ==
=== Sydney results ===
2021 New South Wales local elections: Sydney
Party	Candidate	Votes	%	±%
Team Clover	1. Clover Moore; 2. Jess Scully (elected 1); 3. Robert Kok (elected 5); 4. Emelda Davis (elected 6); 5. William Chan (elected 7); 6. Adam Worling; 7. Mike Galvin; 8. Elaine Czulkowski; 9. Philip Thalis; 10. Jess Miller	47,877	40.8	−14.13
Liberal	1. Shauna Jarrett (elected 2); 2. Lyndon Gannon (elected 8); 3. Sam Danieli; 4. Phyllisse Stanton; 5. Richard Hicklin; 6. Ricky Lee	20,432	17.4	−2.3
Labor	1. Linda Scott (elected 4); 2. Damien Minton; 3. Norma Ingram; 4. Tamira Stevensen; 5. Tony Pooley; 6. Meagan Lawson; 7. Ian Roberts; 8. Frier Bentley	18,077	14.7	+3.07
Greens	1. Sylvie Ellsmore (elected 3); 2. Dejay Toborek; 3. Caroline Alcorso; 4. Chetan Sahai; 5. Mark Smith	12,972	11.1	+5.12
Unite for Sydney	1. Yvonne Weldon (elected 9); 2. Karen Freyer; 3. Stephen Conlon; 4. Meead Saberi Kalaee; 5. Kiran De Silva; 6. Mark Hodge	10,577	9.0	+9.0
Small Business	1. Angela Vithoulkas; 2. Paul Crossin; 3. Tatiana Coulter; 4. Phillip Joel; 5. Allan Sudale; 5. Lisa Jayne; 7. Nicole Santer	7,219	6.2	−1.15 (Note: Compared with the Sydney Matters result at the 2016 election.)
Independent	Wen Zhou	133	0.1	
Independent	John McFadden	75	0.1	
Total formal votes		118,511	98.6	
Informal votes		1,675	1.4	
Turnout		120,186	68.7	
Party total seats			Seats	±
Team Clover			4	▼1
Liberal			2	Steady
Labor			1	Steady
Greens			1	▲1
Independent			1	▲1
Small Business			0	▼1
