= Results of the 2024 New South Wales local elections in Inner Sydney =

2024 New South Wales local elections (Inner Sydney)
- 14 September 2024

This is a list of results for the 2024 New South Wales local elections in the Inner Sydney region.

Inner Sydney covers 10 local government areas (LGAs), including the City of Sydney. A further 23 LGAs are in Outer Sydney and surrounding regions.

== Bayside ==
2024 Bayside Council election
- 14 September 2024

All 15 councillors on Bayside Council 8 seats needed for a majority

	First party	Second party
Party	Labor	Liberal
Last election	7 seats	Did not contest
Seats before	7	2 (Note: Compared to the Independent Liberal result in 2021.)
Seats won	6	5
Seat change	▼1	▲3
First preference vote	28,136	22,088
Percentage	34.6%	27.2%
Swing	▼11.1%	▲17.9%
	Third party	Fourth party
	PB
Leader	Heidi Douglas
Party	Peaceful Bayside	Greens
Last election	1 seat	1 seat
Seats before	1	1
Seats won	2	1
Seat change	▲1	Steady
First preference vote	11,536	10,281
Percentage	14.2%	12.7%
Swing	▲10.5%	▼0.8%
Largest party before election
Labor
Subsequent largest party
Labor

Bayside Council is composed of five three-member wards, totalling 15 councillors. At the 2021 election, Labor won a plurality with seven seats.

=== Bayside results ===
2024 New South Wales local elections: Bayside
Party	Votes	%	Swing	Seats	Change
Labor	28,136	34.6%	−11.1%	6	▼1
Liberal	22,088	27.2%	+17.9%	5	▲3
Peaceful Bayside	11,536	14.2%	+10.5%	2	▲1
Greens	10,281	12.7%	−0.8%	1	Steady
Independents	9,192	11.3%	−16.5%	1	▼3
Formal votes	81,233				
Informal votes					
Total				15	

==== Ward 1 ====
2024 New South Wales local elections: Ward 1
Party	Candidate	Votes	%	±%
Labor	1. Christina Curry (elected 1); 2. Scott Morrissey (elected 2); 3. Jo Jansyn	8,557	50.8%	−9.6%
Liberal	1. Ron Bezic (elected 3); 2. David D'Amato; 3. Stefanie Boutelet	3,649	21.7%	+21.7%
Greens	1. Miles Richards; 2. James Macdonald; 3. Jurgen Weber	1,815	10.8%	−0.2%
Peaceful Bayside	1. Maria Poulos; 2. Vivian Polyblank; 3. Michele Katzeff	1,661	9.9%	+9.9%
Independent	1. Jennifer Muscat; 2. John Muscat; 3. Sarah Monahas	817	4.9%	−11.3%
Independent	1. Vinny Carrabs; 2. Dakhlallah Saleh; 3. Frances Carrabs	335	2.0%	+2.0%
Total formal votes		16,834	93.8%	−0.4%
Informal votes		1,117	6.2%	+0.4%
Turnout		17,951	81.7%	−1.0%

==== Ward 2 ====
2024 New South Wales local elections: Ward 2
Party	Candidate	Votes	%	±%
Labor	1. Soraya Kassim (elected 1); 2. Dorothy Rapisardi; 3. Ted Esdaile-Watts	5,056	32.6%	−20.8%
Liberal	1. Jerome Boutelet (elected 2); 2. Ali Jaafar; 3. Vera Mickovska	3,933	25.3%	+6.8%
Greens	1. Peter Strong (elected 3); 2. Sarah Clunie; 3. Scott Rickard	2,499	16.1%	−2.4%
Independent	1. Olympia Hollink; 2. Glen Ramos; 3. John Araujo	2,340	15.1%	+15.1%
Peaceful Bayside	1. Carolin Wenzel; 2. David Levinson; 3. Gordon Ivanovski	1,692	10.9%	+10.9%
Total formal votes		15,520	93.7%	−0.5%
Informal votes		1,035	6.3%	+0.5%
Turnout		16,555	78.5%	−1.9%

==== Ward 3 ====
2024 New South Wales local elections: Ward 3
Party	Candidate	Votes	%	±%
Liberal	1. Michael Nagi (elected 1); 2. Todor Mickovski; 3. Keer Xu	4,525	27.3%	+27.3%
Labor	1. Christopher Saravinovski (elected 2); 2. Anne Iskandar; 3. Kristian Josifovski	4,385	26.4%	−17.3%
Peaceful Bayside	1. Janin Bredehoeft (elected 3); 2. Virginia Lowe; 3. Catherine Kelly	2,770	16.7%	+16.7%
Greens	1. Greta Werner; 2. Denise Abou Hamad; 3. Tracy Yuen	2,704	16.3%	−6.4%
Independent	1. Andrew Tsounis; 2. Anne Field; 3. Trevor Dyet	1,420	8.6%	−10.7%
Independent	1. Sam Hoballah; 2. Dima Istambouli; 3. Ismael Khalil	742	4.5%	+4.5%
Independent	Mintu Rozario	59	0.4%	+0.4%
Total formal votes		16,605	91.2%	−1.5%
Informal votes		1,602	8.8%	+1.5%
Turnout		18,207	83.9%	+0.7%

==== Ward 4 ====
2024 New South Wales local elections: Ward 4
Party	Candidate	Votes	%	±%
Labor	1. Joe Awada (elected 1); 2. Aida Farhat; 3. Yanning Shi	5,762	35.1%	−5.3%
Liberal	1. Fiona Douskou (elected 2); 2. Rami Abdallah; 3. Vinko Bezic	4,331	26.4%	+26.4%
Independent	1. Liz Barlow (elected 3); 2. Mark Hanna; 3. James Macdonald	2,817	17.2%	−27.7%
Greens	1. Bashir Sawalha; 2. Stephen Kelly; 3. Elizabeth Gordon-Werner	1,968	12.0%	−2.7%
Peaceful Bayside	1. Dominic Galvin; 2. Alexander Cooper; 3. Tina Workman	1,542	9.4%	+9.4%
Total formal votes		16,420	92.3%	−0.7%
Informal votes		1,379	7.7%	+0.7%
Turnout		17,799	86.0%	+0.2%

==== Ward 5 ====
2024 New South Wales local elections: Ward 5
Party	Candidate	Votes	%	±%
Liberal	1. Vicki Poulos (elected 2); 2. Nada Abdallah; 3. Ibtissam Jaafar	5,650	35.6%	+6.6%
Labor	1. Edward McDougall (elected 1); 2. Amelia Raptis; 3. Allan Ajami	4,376	27.6%	−1.3%
Peaceful Bayside	1. Heidi Douglas (elected 3); 2. Andrea Jackson; 3. Jennifer Pelizar	3,871	24.4%	+4.3%
Greens	1. Paul Wade; 2. Faikah Behardien; 3. Boyd Burger	1,295	8.2%	+8.2%
Independent	Jacky Angelovski	662	4.2%	+4.2%
Total formal votes		15,854	92.2%	+0.7%
Informal votes		1,336	7.8%	−0.7%
Turnout		17,190	82.3%	−2.1%

== Hunter's Hill ==
2024 Hunter's Hill Council election
- 14 September 2024

All 6 seats on Hunter's Hill Council (Note: Excluding the mayor, who is directly-elected.) 4 seats needed for a majority
	First party	Second party	Third party
		ROSS	HHI
Leader	Zac Miles	Ross Williams	Marc Lane
Party	Liberal	Team Ross	Hunter's Hill Inds
Last election	3 seats	1 seat	Did not exist
Seats before	3	1	1
Seats won	4	1	1
Seat change	▲1	Steady	Steady
First preference vote	4,709	2,056	1,582
Percentage	56.4%	24.6%	19.0%
Swing	▲17.9%
Largest party before election
No overall control
Subsequent largest party
Liberal

Hunter's Hill Council is composed of two three-member wards, as well as a directly elected mayor.

The Liberal Party was the only registered party contesting the election. North Ward councillor Ross Williams led leading "Team Ross", while South Ward councillor Jim Sanderson ran on the ticket of the new "Hunter's Hill Independents" group.

Incumbent independent councillors Elizabeth Krassoi and Richard Quinn did not seek re-election.

=== Hunter's Hill results ===
2024 New South Wales local elections: Hunter's Hill
Party	Votes	%	Swing	Seats	Change
Liberal	4,709	56.4%	+17.9%	4	▲1
Team Ross	2,056	24.6%	+9.3%	1	Steady
Hunter's Hill Independents	1,582	19.0%	+8.7%	1	(Note: Hunter's Hill Independents candidate Jim Sanderson was elected as an unaffiliated Independent in 2021, but lost his seat to party leader Marc Lane)
Formal votes	8,347	96.82%			
Informal votes	294	3.18%			
Total	8,621	100.00%		15	

==== North Ward ====
2024 New South Wales local elections: North Ward
Party	Candidate	Votes	%	±%
Liberal	1. Carol Tannous-Sleiman (elected); 2. Carla Kassab (elected); 3. Marianne Doyle	2,213	51.8%	+14.0%
Team Ross	1. Ross Williams (elected); 2. Linda Veloskey; 3. Maree Brooks	2,056	48.2%	+18.0%
Total formal votes		4,269	96.08%	
Informal votes		174	3.92%	
Turnout		4,443	100.00%	

==== South Ward ====
2024 New South Wales local elections: South Ward
Party	Candidate	Votes	%	±%
Liberal	1. Tayna Virgara (elected); 2. Julia Prieston (elected); 3. Zac Miles	2,496	61.2%	+21.9%
Hunter's Hill Independents	1. Marc Lane (elected); 2. Jim Sanderson; 3. Jay Ryves; 4. Chris Mutton	1,582	38.8%	+17.9%
Total formal votes		4,078	97.14%	
Informal votes		120	2.86%	
Turnout		4,198	100.00%	

== Inner West ==
2024 Inner West Council election
- 14 September 2024

All 15 councillors on Inner West Council 8 seats needed for a majority

	First party	Second party
Party	Labor	Greens
Last election	8 seats	5 seats
Seats before	8	5
Seats won	8	5
Seat change	Steady	Steady
First preference vote	46,210	37,024
Percentage	42.54%	34.08%
Swing	▲3.94%	▼1.20%
	Third party	Fourth party
	IND
Party	Independents	Liberal
Last election	2 seats	Did not contest
Seats before	2	0
Seats won	1	1
Seat change	▼1	▲1
First preference vote	8,690	16,490
Percentage	8.00%	15.18%
Swing	▼7.30%	▲8.68%
Largest party before election
Labor
Subsequent largest party
TBD

Inner West Council is composed of five three-member wards, totalling 15 councillors. At the 2021 election, Labor won a majority with eight seats.

The Liberal Party endorsed candidates, having done so in 2017 but not in 2021. The party did not contest Marrickville–Midjuburi Ward, where former independent councillor Victor Macri successfully ran.

=== Inner West results ===
2024 New South Wales local elections: Inner West
Party	Votes	%	Swing	Seats	Change
Labor	46,210	42.54%	+3.94%	8	Steady
Greens	37,024	34.08%	−1.20%	5	Steady
Liberal	16,490	15.18%	+8.68%	1	Steady
Independents	8,690	8.00%	−7.30%	1	Steady
Libertarian	212	0.20%	+0.20%	0	new
Formal votes	108,626				
Informal votes	3,432				
Total	112,058				

==== Ashfield–Djarrawunang Ward ====
2024 New South Wales local elections: Ashfield–Djarrawunang (Magpie) Ward
Party	Candidate	Votes	%	±%
Labor	1. Jessica D'Arienzo (elected 1); 2. Jo Carlisle (elected 3); 3. Elayn James	9,444	42.74%	
Greens	1. Izabella Antoniou (elected 2); 2. Nabilah Chowdhury; 3. Beth Allen	7,853	35.54%	
Liberal	1. Wenjie Zhang; 2. Funing Guo; 3. Lauren Shen	4,800	21.72%	
Total formal votes		22,097		
Informal votes		831		

==== Balmain–Baludarri Ward ====
2024 New South Wales local elections: Balmain–Baludarri (Leather Jacket) Ward
Party	Candidate	Votes	%	±%
Labor	1. Darcy Byrne (elected 2); 2. Kerry Fergusson (elected 3); 3. Brian Frankham	9,586	43.27%	
Greens	1. Ismet Tastan (elected 1); 2. Shelley Booth; 3. Michael Davis	5,892	26.60%	
Independent	1. John Stamolis; 2. Tracey Brooks; 3. Kathleen Hacking	3,304	14.91%	
Liberal	1. Christian Bracci; 2. Joanne Navarra; 3. Elizabeth Levy	3,105	14.02%	
Independent	Taneal Sultana	249	1.12%	
Independent	Dorothy Bassil	18	0.08%	
Total formal votes		22,154		
Informal votes		483		

==== Leichhardt–Gulgadya Ward ====
2024 New South Wales local elections: Leichhardt–Gulgadya (Grass Tree) Ward
Party	Candidate	Votes	%	±%
Labor	1. Philippa Scott (elected 2); 2. Tim Stephens; 3. Emma Taksa-Grimshaw	9,251	41.70%	
Greens	1. Andrew Blake (elected 1); 2. Luciana Carusi; 3. Brooke Richards	7,111	32.06%	
Liberal	1. Vittoria Raciti (elected 3); 2. Maurizio Coco; 3. Domenico Stefanelli	5,609	25.29%	
Libertarian	Matthew O'Connor	212	0.96%	
Total formal votes		22,183		
Informal votes		747		

==== Marrickville–Midjuburi Ward ====
2024 New South Wales local elections: Marrickville–Midjuburi (Lillypilly) Ward
Party	Candidate	Votes	%	±%
Labor	1. Mat Howard (elected 1); 2. Leah Horsley; 3. Christine Su-Manlutac	8,802	41.87%	
Greens	1. Olivia Barlow (elected 2); 2. Justine Langford; 3. Peter Olive	7,101	33.78%	
Independent	1. Victor Macri (elected 3); 2. Arthur Alepidis; 3. Catherine Nguyen	5,119	24.35%	
Total formal votes		21,022		
Informal votes		800		

==== Stanmore–Damun Ward ====
2024 New South Wales local elections: Stanmore–Damun (Port Jackson Fig) Ward
Party	Candidate	Votes	%	±%
Labor	1. Chloe Smith (elected 1); 2. Vicki Clay (elected 3); 3. Mits Delisle	9,127	43.11%	
Greens	1. Liz Atkins (elected 2); 2. Flynn Franklin-Baker; 3. Robert Shield	9,067	42.83%	
Liberal	1. Rosana Tyler; 2. Alicia Tyler; 3. Edward Tyler	2,976	14.06%	
Total formal votes		21,170		
Informal votes		571		

== Lane Cove ==
2024 Lane Cove Council election
- 14 September 2024

All 9 seats on Lane Cove Council 5 seats needed for a majority
Largest party before election
Liberal
Subsequent largest party
Independent

Lane Cove Council is composed of three wards, each electing three councillors. The Liberal Party were unable to contest any wards after missing the candidate nomination deadline.

=== Lane Cove results ===
2024 New South Wales local elections: Lane Cove
Party	Votes	%	Swing	Seats	Change
Labor	5,402	23.0	−0.1	2	▼1
Greens	3,399	14.5	+9.0	1	Steady
Independents	14,681	62.5	+22.0	6	▲4
Formal votes	23,482	94.6			
Informal votes	1,338	5.4			
Total	24,820				

=== Central ===
2024 New South Wales local elections: Central Ward
Party	Candidate	Votes	%	±%
Independent	1. Bridget Kennedy (elected 1); 2. Alex Vaccher; 3. Sally Kennedy	2,169	28.9	−4.4
Independent	1. Kathy Bryla (elected 2); 2. Trent Gardiner; 3. Tanya Phillips	2,136	28.5	
Independent	1. Caleb Taylor (elected 3); 2. Yi (Ian) Bao; 3. Sarah O'Donnell	1,685	22.5	
Labor	1. Ken Quail; 2. Lyn Nasir; 3. Bronwyn Deane	1,506	20.1	−1.6
Total formal votes		7,496	93.0	
Informal votes		562	7.0	
Turnout		8,058	86.5	

=== East ===
2024 New South Wales local elections: East Ward
Party	Candidate	Votes	%	±%
Independent	1. Merri Southwood (elected 1); 2. Helena Greenwall (elected 2); 3. Peter Re	4,121	58.1	+30.4
Labor	1. David Roenfeldt (elected 3); 2. Rachel Baker; 3. Sieger de Vries	1,617	22.8	+5.9
Greens	1. Nick Riggs; 2. Milo Riggs; 3. Alan King	1,351	19.1	
Total formal votes		7,089	95.0	
Informal votes		371	5.0	
Turnout		7,460	82.4	

=== West ===
2024 New South Wales local elections: West Ward
Party	Candidate	Votes	%	±%
Independent	1. Scott Bennison (elected 1); 2. Deborah Hill; 3. Daniel Strassberg	3,064	41.5	
Labor	1. Katie Little (elected 2); 2. James Hansen; 3. Heather Ogilive	2,279	30.8	+0.6
Greens	1. Rochelle Flood (elected 3); 2. Murtaza Rangwala; 3. Seamus Lee	2,048	27.7	+11.6
Total formal votes		7,391	94.8	
Informal votes		405	5.2	
Turnout		7,796	85.4	

== Mosman ==
2024 Mosman Council election
- 14 September 2024

All 7 seats on Mosman Council 4 seats needed for a majority
- Registered: 21,134
- Mayor
- Turnout: 81.36% (▼0.71)
	First party	Second party	Third party
	SM	IND	MB
Candidate	Ann Kimber	Peter Menzies	Roy Bendall
Party	Serving Mosman	Independent	Mosman Better
Primary vote	8,099	3,720	3,352
Percentage	48.56%	22.30%	21.18%
Swing	▲5.56	▲0.98	▲4.49
TCP	63.16%	36.84%
TCP swing	▼1.62	▲1.62
Mayor before election
Carolyn Corrigan
Serving Mosman
Elected Mayor
Ann Kimber
Serving Mosman
- Councillors
- Turnout: 81.4%
Party	Leader	Vote %	Seats	+/–
Serving Mosman	Ann Kimber	43.1	3	0
Independent	Simon Menzies	21.9	1	0
Mosman Better	Roy Bendall	18.9	1	0
Greens	Colleen Godsell	10.1	1	+1
This lists parties that won seats. See the complete results below.
Results by ward

Mosman Council is composed of a directly-elected mayor and six councillors elected proportionally to a single ward.

=== Mosman mayor ===
2024 New South Wales mayoral elections: Mosman
Party	Candidate	Votes	%	±%
Serving Mosman	Ann Kimber	8,099	48.56	+5.56
Independent	Peter Menzies	3,720	22.30	+0.98
Mosman Better	Roy Bendall	3,352	21.18	+4.49
Labor	John Wakefield	1,327	7.96	+7.96
Total formal votes		16,678	96.99	–0.05
Informal votes		518	3.01	+0.05
Turnout		17,196	81.36	–0.71
Two-candidate-preferred result
Serving Mosman	Ann Kimber	8,827	63.16	–1.62
Independent	Simon Menzies	5,149	36.84	+1.62
Serving Mosman hold		Swing	–1.62	

=== Mosman results ===
2024 New South Wales local elections: Mosman
Party	Candidate	Votes	%	±%
Serving Mosman	1. Ann Kimber; 2. Carolyn Corrigan (elected 1); 3. Michael Randall (elected 4); 4. Pip Friedrich (elected 5); 5. Harley Van Der Pluijm	7,062	43.1	+0.7
Independent	1. Simon Menzies (elected 2); 2. Libby Moline; 3. Kata Kiss	3,595	21.9	+1.5
Mosman Better	1. Roy Bendall (elected 3); 2. Jacqui Willoughby; 3. Alessandro Marturano; 4. Miranda Barclay; 5. Kim Blackburne	3,102	18.9	+0.7
Greens	1. Colleen Godsell (elected 6); 2. Oliver Godsell; 3. Ruth Marshall	1,659	10.1	+10.1
Labor	1. John Wakefield; 2. Alyson Wills; 3. Warren Yates	971	5.9	+5.9
Total formal votes		16,389	95.3	
Informal votes		807	4.7	
Turnout		17,196	81.4	

== Randwick ==
2024 Randwick City Council election
- 14 September 2024

All 15 seats on Randwick City Council 8 seats needed for a majority

	First party	Second party
Party	Labor	Liberal
Last election	5 seats	5 seats
Seats before	5	5
Seats won	6	5
Seat change	▲1	Steady
First preference vote	24,480	24,269
Percentage	36.12%	35.81%
Swing	▲5.12%	▲9.31%
	Third party	Fourth party
		IND
Party	Greens	Independents
Last election	4 seats	1 seats
Seats before	4	1
Seats won	3	1
Seat change	▼1	Steady
First preference vote	13,909	4,934
Percentage	20.52%	32.99%
Swing	▼0.88%	▼6.11%
Largest party before election
Australian Labor Party
Subsequent largest party
Australian Labor Party

Randwick City Council is composed of five three-member wards.

=== Randwick results ===
2024 New South Wales local elections: Randwick
Party	Votes	%	Swing	Seats	Change
Labor	24,480	36.12%	+5.12%	6	▲1
Liberal	24,269	35.81%	+9.31%	5	Steady
Greens	13,909	20.52%	–0.88%	3	▼1
Independents	4,934	7.28%	–6.11%	1	Steady
Formal votes	67,772	95.94%			
Informal votes	2,754	4.06%			
Total	70,526			15	

==== Central Ward ====
2024 New South Wales local elections: Central Ward
Party	Candidate	Votes	%	±%
Labor	1. Dylan Parker (elected); 2. Dexter Gordon (elected); 3. Tanna Klevansky	6,396	46.29%	+10.19%
Liberal	1. Daniel Rosenfeld (elected); 2. Anna Fernando; 3. David Arnfield	4,949	35.82%	+8.42%
Greens	1. Kym Chapple; 2. Jonathon Beves; 3. James Mollison	2,471	17.89%	+0.98%
Total formal votes		13,816	95.58%	−0.62%
Informal votes		639	4.42%	+0.62%

==== East Ward ====
2024 New South Wales local elections: East Ward
Party	Candidate	Votes	%	±%
Labor	1. Marea Wilson (elected); 2. Patrick Cunningham; 3. Katherine Summers	4,706	37.21%	+6.11%
Liberal	1. Carolyn Martin (elected); 2. Lisa Belcher; 3. James Giltinan	4,951	39.14%	+10.34%
Greens	1. Masoomeh Asgari (elected); 2. Wendy Smith; 3. Michael Atherton	2,991	23.65%	−3.55%
Total formal votes		12,468	96.44%	−0.39%
Informal votes		467	+3.56%	+0.39%

==== North Ward ====
2024 New South Wales local elections: North Ward
Party	Candidate	Votes	%	±%
Labor	1. Aaron Magner (elected); 2. Madeleine Treacy-Maclean; 3. Louise Griffin	4,904	37.08%	+7.37%
Liberal	1. Christie Hamilton (elected); 2. Katharine Beaumont; 3. Jason Young	5,123	38.73%	+6.36%
Greens	1. Clare Willington (elected); 2. Maureen Fitzgerald; 3. Stuart Davis	3,200	24.19%	−4.67%
Total formal votes		13,227	97.11%	−0.06%
Informal votes		394	2.89%	+0.06%

==== South Ward ====
2024 New South Wales local elections: South Ward
Party	Candidate	Votes	%	±%
Labor	1. Danny Said (elected); 2. Susan Hutchison; 3. Katelyn Shore	4,361	29.16%	−0.84%
Liberal	1. Bill Burst (elected); 2. Yuen Lee; 3. David Morgan	3,874	25.91%	+7.1
Greens	1. Russell Weston; 2. Daniel Keogh; 3. Jennifer Onyx	1,785	11.94%	−0.16%
Independent	1. Noel D'Souza (elected); 2. Carlos Da Rocha; 3. Annick Antoine	4,934	32.99%	−6.11%
Total formal votes		14,954	95.44%	−0.30%
Informal votes		715	4.56%	+0.30%

==== West Ward ====
2024 New South Wales local elections: West Ward
Party	Candidate	Votes	%	±%
Labor	1. Alexandra Luxford (elected); 2. Ivan Bull; 3. Yanni Luxford	4,473	33.61%	+5.78%
Liberal	1. Andrew Hay (elected); 2. Grace Tan; 3. David Smallbone	5,372	40.37%	+14.45%
Greens	1. Philipa Veitch (elected); 2. Jennifer Jenkins-Flint; 3. Simeon Bryan	3,462	26.02%	+3.00%
Total formal votes		13,307	96.11%	−0.11%
Informal votes		539	3.89%	+0.11%

== Sydney ==
=== Sydney results ===
2024 New South Wales local elections: Sydney
Party	Candidate	Votes	%	±%
Team Clover	1. Clover Moore; 2. Robert Kok (elected 1); 3. Jess Miller (elected 5); 4. Adam Worling (elected 6); 5. William Chan; 6. Emelda Davis; 7. Lachlan Barker-Kennedy; 8. Jenny Burn; 9. Christine Byrne; 10. Claudia Bowman	28,201	31.9	−8.9
Labor	1. Zann Maxwell (elected 2); 2. Mitch Wilson (elected 7); 3. Tamira Stevenson; 4. Holly Rebeiro; 5. Michelle Perry; 6. Luc Harvey	17,605	19.9	+5.2
Greens	1. Sylvie Ellsmore (elected 3); 2. Matthew Thompson (elected 9); 3. Jay Gillieatt; 4. Caroline Alcorso; 5. Chetan Sahai	14,223	16.1	+5.0
Liberal	1. Lyndon Gannon (elected 4); 2. Patrice Pandeleos; 3. Alex (Ke) Xu; 4. Bearte McDonald; 5. James Dore	12,704	14.4	−3.0
Weldon Independents	1. Yvonne Weldon (elected 8); 2. Rod Morrison; 3. Daniel McDonald; 4. Alison Davey; 5. Murray Gatt	8,144	9.2	+0.2
Libertarian	1. Sean Masters; 2. Rahn Wood; 3. Clinton Mead; 4. James Hanks; 5. Rosalind Hecker	3,616	4.1	+4.1
We Love Sydney Independents	1. Sam Danieli; 2. Geoffrey Alder; 3. Mirjana Andric; 4. Scott Davis; 5. Catherine Yang	2,478	2.8	+2.8
Socialist Alliance	1. Rachel Evans; 2. Andrew Chuter; 3. Adam Haddad; 4. Coral Wynter; 5. Suelin McCauley; 6. Jim McIlr	984	1.1	+1.1
Independent	Susan Ritchie	343	0.4	+0.4
Independent	Baiyu Chen	56	0.1	+0.1
Total formal votes		88,354	96.0	
Informal votes		3,690	4.0	
Turnout		92,044	72.87	

== Waverley ==
2024 Waverley Council election
- 14 September 2024

All 12 councillors on Waverley Council 7 seats needed for a majority

	First party	Second party
Party	Liberal	Labor
Last election	5 seats	4 seats
Seats before	5	4
Seats won	6	3
Seat change	▲1	▼1
First preference vote	16,767	24,480
Percentage	51.3%	19.8%
Swing	▲2.3%	▼7.4%
	Third party	Fourth party
		IND
Party	Greens	Independents
Last election	3 seats	0 seats
Seats before	3	0
Seats won	2	1
Seat change	▼1	▲1
First preference vote	5,465	3,988
Percentage	16.7%	12.2%
Swing	▼6.5%	▲11.6%
- Post-election council composition
Largest party before election
Liberal
Subsequent largest party
Liberal

Waverley Council is composed of four three-member wards, totalling 12 councillors.

The Liberals won a seat in Lawson from the Greens, while former Labor councillor Steven Lewis won a seat in Hunter from Labor, running as an independent.

=== Waverley results ===
2024 New South Wales local elections: Waverley
Party	Votes	%	Swing	Seats	Change
Liberal	16,767	51.3%	+2.3%	6	▲1
Labor	6,487	19.8%	−7.4%	3	▼1
Greens	5,465	16.7%	−6.5%	2	▼1
Independents	3,988	12.2%	+11.6%	1	▲1
Formal votes	32,707	96.04%			
Informal votes	1,347	3.96%			
Total	34,054	100.00%		15	

==== Bondi Ward ====
2024 New South Wales local elections: Bondi Ward
Party	Candidate	Votes	%	±%
Liberal	1. Michelle Stephenson (elected 1); 2. Olena Valenza; 3. Phillip Occhiuto	3,399	45.72%	+7.82%
Greens	1. Dominic Wy Kanak (elected 2); 2. Larissa Payne; 3. Chris Maltby	2,144	28.84%	−7.66%
Labor	1. Margaret Merten (elected 3); 2. Diane Smith; 3. David Elfick	1,892	25.45%	−0.15%
Total formal votes		7,435	96.82%	
Informal votes		244	3.18%	

==== Hunter Ward ====
2024 New South Wales local elections: Hunter Ward
Party	Candidate	Votes	%	±%
Liberal	1. Will Nemesh (elected 1); 2. Dov Frazer (elected 2); 3. Kate Boskovitz	5,469	66.49%	−3.71%
Independent	1. Steven Lewis (elected 3); 2. Bruce Daly; 3. William Lewis	1,500	18.24%	+18.24%
Independent	1. Miriam Guttman-Jones; 2. Annette Guerry; 3. Adam Jones	1,256	15.27%	+15.27%
Total formal votes		8,225	95.25%	
Informal votes		410	4.75%	

==== Lawson Ward ====
2024 New South Wales local elections: Lawson Ward
Party	Candidate	Votes	%	±%
Liberal	1. Katherine Westwood (elected 1); 2. Lauren Townsend (elected 3); 3. Emma Mcmillan-Baer	4,365	48.92%	+5.92%
Labor	1. Paula Masselos (elected 2); 2. Gregory Vaughan; 3. Bridget O'Neill	2,817	31.57%	+4.17%
Greens	1. Mora Main; 2. Claire Bocking; 3. Susan Hely	1,740	19.50%	−7.80%
Total formal votes		8,922	96.93%	
Informal votes		283	3.07%	

==== Waverley Ward ====
2024 New South Wales local elections: Waverley Ward
Party	Candidate	Votes	%	±%
Liberal	1. Joshua Spicer (elected 1); 2. Brad Cole; 3. Susan Moallem	3,534	43.50%	−0.50%
Labor	1. Keri Spooner (elected 2); 2. James Pelosi; 3. Sian Gilbert	1,778	21.88%	−4.02%
Greens	1. Ludovico Fabiano (elected 3); 2. George Copeland; 3. Prue Cancian	1,581	19.46%	−10.74%
Independent	1. Axel Vigna; 2. Jade Stapleton; 3. Paul Gibson	1,232	15.2%	+15.2%
Total formal votes		8,125	97.24%	
Informal votes		231	2.76%	

== Willoughby ==
2024 Willoughby City Council election
- 14 September 2024

All 12 councillors on Willoughby City Council 6 seats needed for a majority
Largest party before election
Independents
Subsequent largest party
Independents

Willoughby City Council is composed of four wards, each electing three councillors, as well as a directly elected mayor.

The Liberal Party does not formally endorse candidates in Willoughby, although local Liberal state MPs Tim James and Rachel Merton endorsed Angelo Rozos in Middle Harbour Ward.

=== Willoughby results ===
2024 New South Wales local elections: Willoughby
Party	Votes	%	Swing	Seats	Change
Independents	14,187	38.87		4	
Community Independents	8,071	22.11		4	
Independent Liberal	4,704	12.88		1	
Community Matters	3,697	10.12		1	
Independent Labor	2,474	6.77		1	
Team Roy	1,957	5.36		1	
Labor	1,407	3.85		0	
Formal votes	36,497				
Informal votes	3,010				
Total	39,507	100.0		12	
Registered voters / turnout	92.38				

=== Middle Harbour ===
2024 New South Wales local elections: Middle Harbour Ward
Party	Candidate	Votes	%	±%
Independent Liberal	1. Angelo Rozos (elected); 2. William Yiu; 3. Megan Rozos	3,017	32.86	
Independent	1. Robert Samuel (elected); 2. Stephanie Spencer; 3. Olivia Huang; 4. Diana Brown	2,710	29.52	
Community Independents	1. Kristina Dodds (elected); 2. Eva Coulam; 3. Robyn Pettit	1,851	20.16	
Independent	1. Sarkis Mouradian; 2. Mayank Gupta; 3. Ava Taylor	1,603	17.46	
Total formal votes		9,181		
Informal votes		736		
Turnout		9,917		

=== Naremburn ===
2024 New South Wales local elections: Naremburn Ward
Party	Candidate	Votes	%	±%
Independent Labor	1. Nic Wright (elected); 2. April Pressler; 3. Michael Wright	2,474	28.05	
Community Independents	1. Anna Greco (elected); 2. Mary Ann Irvin; 3. Susan Enners	2,348	26.62	
Independent	1. Georgie Roussac (elected); 2. Kesh Anand; 3. Peter Wang	2,276	25.80	
Independent	1. Michael Chen; 2. Amanda Ley; 3. Max Leo; 4. Michael Zhao	1,722	19.52	
Total formal votes		8,820		
Informal votes		730		
Turnout		9,550		

=== Sailors Bay ===
2024 New South Wales local elections: Sailors Bay Ward
Party	Candidate	Votes	%	±%
Community Matters	1. Tanya Taylor; 2. Sarah Royds (elected); 3. Ello Meguerditchian; 4. Geoffrey Taylor	3,697	39.18	
Community Independents	1. John Moratelli (elected); 2. Lorraine Cairnes; 3. Vivien Choong	2,096	22.21	
Team Roy	1. Roy McCullagh (elected); 2. Amber Molloy; 3. Bill May; 4. Christopher White; 5. Douglas Devine; 6. Lesley Berry	1,957	20.74	
Independent Liberal	1. Hugh Eriksson; 2. Dion Woo; 3. Victoria Johns	1,687	17.88	
Total formal votes		9,437		
Informal votes		791		
Turnout		10,228		

=== West ===
2024 New South Wales local elections: West Ward
Party	Candidate	Votes	%	±%
Independent	1. Craig Campbell (Ind. Lib) (elected); 2. Yu (Carol) Chen; 3. Kathleen Wong	2,249	24.83	
Community Independents	1. Andrew Nelson (elected); 2. Joe Grundy; 3. Diana Pryde	1,776	19.60	
Independent	1. Michelle Chuang (elected); 2. Maria Chan; 3. Zachary Putra Anderton; 4. John Hooper; 5. Man-Kyoung Park	1,411	15.58	
Labor	1. Cathy Duloy; 2. John (Sean) Graham; 3. Ann Jeffriess	1,407	15.53	
Independent	1. Jam Xia (Ind. Lib); 2. Charles Elliott; 3. Michelle Elliott	1,200	13.25	
Independent	1. Hao Luo (Ind. Labor); 2. Nicholas Leung; 3. Song Bai	913	10.08	
Independent	Jade Yu-Chun Hsueh	103	1.14	
Total formal votes		9,059		
Informal votes		753		
Turnout		9,812		

== Woollahra ==
2024 Woollahra Council election
- 14 September 2024

All 15 councillors on Woollahra Council 7 seats needed for a majority

	First party	Second party	Third party
Party	Liberal	Residents First	Greens
Last election	8 seats	5 seats	2 seats
Seats before	8	5	2
Seats won	9	5	1
Seat change	▲1	Steady	▼1
Primary vote	16,143	9,393	2,769
Percentage	57.03%	33.18%	9.78%
Swing	▲6.33	▼4.62	▼1.72
- Results by ward
Largest party before election
Liberal
Subsequent largest party
Liberal

Woollahra Council is composed of five three-member wards, totalling 15 councillors.

Incumbent Greens councillor Nicola Grieve lost her seat in Cooper Ward, which covers the suburb of Woollahra and parts of Bondi Junction.

=== Woollahra results ===
2024 New South Wales local elections: Woollahra
Party	Votes	Seats	Change	%	Swing
Liberal	16,143	9	▲1	57.03	▲6.33
Residents First Woollahra	9,393	5	Steady	33.18	▼4.62
Greens	2,769	1	▼1	9.78	▼1.72
Formal votes	28,305			96.46	
Informal votes	1,039			3.54	
Total	29,344	15		100.00	

==== Bellevue Hill Ward ====
2024 New South Wales local elections: Bellevue Hill Ward
Party	Candidate	Votes	%	±%
Liberal	1. Sean Carmichael (elected 2); 2. Hugh Woodgate (elected 3); 3. Isabelle Shapiro	3,510	63.58	+7.08
Residents First Woollahra	1. Lucinda Regan (elected 1); 2. Naomi McCurdie; 3. Michele Havas	2,011	36.42	–7.08
Total formal votes		5,521		
Informal votes		217		

==== Cooper Ward ====
2024 New South Wales local elections: Cooper Ward
Party	Candidate	Votes	%	±%
Liberal	1. Sarah Swan (elected 1); 2. Jeanette Mitchell (elected 3); 3. Richard Allsop	3,132	54.99	+8.29
Residents First Woollahra	1. Torsten Blackwood (elected 2); 2. Luise Elsing; 3. Claire Wivell Plater	1,362	23.91	–5.39
Greens	1. Nicola Grieve; 2. Leila Excell; 3. Rosemary White	1,202	21.10	–2.80
Total formal votes		5,696		
Informal votes		167		

==== Double Bay Ward ====
2024 New South Wales local elections: Double Bay Ward
Party	Candidate	Votes	%	±%
Liberal	1. Toni Zeltzer (elected 1); 2. James Ardouin (elected 3); 3. Susan Wynne	3,108	59.02	+3.92
Residents First Woollahra	1. Mark Silcoks (elected 2); 2. Anthony Marano; 3. Karin Olah	2,158	40.98	–3.92
Total formal votes		5,266		
Informal votes		242		

==== Paddington Ward ====
2024 New South Wales local elections: Paddington Ward
Party	Candidate	Votes	%	±%
Liberal	1. Alexander Andruska (elected 1); 2. Natasha Goulden; 3. Kahu Millin	2,098	36.55	+4.45
Residents First Woollahra	1. Harriet Price (elected 2); 2. Rebecca O'Donnell; 3. Martin Green	2,075	36.15	+1.05
Greens	1. Matthew Robertson (elected 3); 2. John Benz; 3. Jennie Medway	1,567	27.30	–5.50
Total formal votes		5,740		
Informal votes		169		

==== Vaucluse ====
2024 New South Wales local elections: Vaucluse Ward
Party	Candidate	Votes	%	±%
Liberal	1. Mary-Lou Jarvis (elected 1); 2. Julian Parmegiani (elected 3); 3. Katrina Selig	4,295	70.62	+7.42
Residents First Woollahra	1. Merrill Halkerston-Witt (elected 2); 2. Charles Mortimer; 3. Tresna Karras	1,787	29.38	–7.42
Total formal votes		6,082		
Informal votes		244		
