= Results of the 2021 New South Wales local elections in Outer Sydney =

2021 New South Wales local elections (Outer Sydney)
- 4 December 2021

This is a list of results for the 2021 New South Wales local elections in Outer Sydney including the Central Coast, though the region is considered to be separate from Greater Sydney.

Outer Sydney and surrounds covers 22 local government areas (LGAs) (excluding the Central Coast), including Blue Mountains, Hawkesbury and Wollondilly. A further 10 LGAs are in the Inner Sydney region.

== Blacktown ==
The Liberal Party did not endorse any candidates, including its five councillors elected in 2016.

2021 New South Wales local elections: Blacktown
Party	Votes	%	Swing	Seats	Change
Labor	98,633	53.6	+1.8	10	Steady
Blacktown Coalition Team	33,720	18.3	+18.3	1	▲1
Independent Liberal	32,747	17.8		3	▲3
Your Community Coalition	9,104	4.9	+4.9	1	▲1
Greens	4,632	2.5		0	Steady
Blacktown Matters Independents	4,335	2.4		0	Steady
Independent	981	0.5		0	Steady
Formal votes	184,152	93.47			
Informal votes	12,862	6.53			
Total	197,014	100.0			

=== Ward 1 ===
Elected councillor	Party
Moninder Singh	Labor
Christopher Quilkey	Labor
Jess Diaz	Ind. Liberal

2021 New South Wales local elections: Ward 1
Party	Candidate	Votes	%	±%
Labor		22,693	51.6	
Independent Liberal		12,285	27.2	
Blacktown Coalition Team		8,534	19.4	
Independent	Anil Kumar	500	1.1	
Total formal votes		44,012	53.9	
Informal votes		2,857	6.1	
Turnout			86.6	

=== Ward 2 ===
Elected councillor	Party
Julie Griffiths	Labor
Kushpinder Kaur	Labor
Michael Stubley	Coalition Team

2021 New South Wales local elections: Ward 2
Party	Candidate	Votes	%	±%
Labor		16,589	47.6	
Blacktown Coalition Team		9,277	26.6	
Greens		4,632	13.3	
Independent Liberal		4,136	11.9	
Independent	Kittu Randhawa	220	0.6	
Total formal votes		34,854	94.0	
Informal votes		2,211	6.0	
Turnout			85.2	

=== Ward 3 ===
Elected councillor	Party
Susai Benjamin	Labor
Kathie Collins	Labor
Allan Green	Community Coalition

2021 New South Wales local elections: Ward 3
Party	Candidate	Votes	%	±%
	Labor	19,245	57.1	
	Your Community Coalition	9,104	27.0	
	Blacktown Coalition Team	5,332	15.8	
Total formal votes		33,681	93.4	
Informal votes		2,398	6.6	
Turnout			83.6	

=== Ward 4 ===
Elected councillor	Party
Carol Israel	Labor
Bob Fitzgerald	Labor
Peter Camilleri	Ind. Liberal

2021 New South Wales local elections: Ward 4
Party	Candidate	Votes	%	±%
	Labor	20,485	57.9	
	Independent Liberal	8,905	25.2	
	Blacktown Coalition Team	5,961	16.9	
Total formal votes		35,351	93.5	
Informal votes		2,447	6.5	
Turnout			84.6	

=== Ward 5 ===
Elected councillor	Party
Tony Bleasdale	Labor
Brad Bunting	Labor
Livingston Chettipally	Ind. Liberal

2021 New South Wales local elections: Ward 5
Party	Candidate	Votes	%	±%
Labor		19,621	54.1	
Independent Liberal		7,421	20.5	
Blacktown Coalition Team		4,616	12.7	
Blacktown Matters Independents		4,335	12.0	
Independent	Ammar Khan	261	0.7	
Total formal votes		36,254	92.5	
Informal votes		2,949	7.5	
Turnout			78.4	

== Blue Mountains ==
2021 New South Wales local elections: Blue Mountains
Party	Votes	%	Swing	Seats	Change
Labor	24,032	49.2	+11.4	6	▲1
Liberal	11,750	24.1	−1.1	3	▼1
Greens	7,296	14.9	−4.3	2	Steady
Independent	5,755	11.8	−5.9	1	Steady
Formal votes	48,833	96.48			
Informal votes	1,784	3.52			
Total	50,617	100.00			

=== Ward 1 ===
Elected councillor	Party
Suzie van Opdorp	Labor
Kevin Schreiber	Liberal
Sarah Redshaw	Greens

2021 New South Wales local elections: Ward 1
Party	Candidate	Votes	%	±%
	Labor	5,303	46.4	
	Greens	3,267	28.6	
	Liberal	2,865	25.1	
Total formal votes		11,435	95.8	
Informal votes		501	4.2	
Turnout		11,936	82.6	

=== Ward 2 ===
Elected councillor	Party
Claire West	Labor
Romola Hollywood	Labor
Brent Hoare	Greens

2021 New South Wales local elections: Ward 2
Party	Candidate	Votes	%	±%
	Labor	5,950	47.6	
	Liberal	2,270	18.2	
	Independent	2,145	17.2	
	Greens	2,128	17.0	
Total formal votes		12,493	96.3	
Informal votes		474	3.7	
Turnout		12,967	88.4	

=== Ward 3 ===
Elected councillor	Party
Mick Fell	Labor
Roza Sage	Liberal
Daniel Myles	Independent

2021 New South Wales local elections: Ward 3
Party	Candidate	Votes	%	±%
	Labor	4,821	38.4	
	Liberal	3,873	30.8	
	Independent	1,972	15.7	
	Greens	1,901	15.1	
Total formal votes		12,567	96.7	
Informal votes		425	3.3	
Turnout		12,992	88.4	

=== Ward 4 ===
Elected councillor	Party
Mark Greenhill	Labor
Nyree Fisher	Labor
Brendan Christie	Liberal

2021 New South Wales local elections: Ward 4
Party	Candidate	Votes	%	±%
	Labor	7,958	64.5	
	Liberal	2,742	22.2	
	Independent	1,638	13.3	
Total formal votes		12,338	97.0	
Informal votes		384	3.0	
Turnout		12,722	89.2	

== Burwood ==
Elected councillor	Party
Heather Crichton	Labor
George Mannah	Labor
Pascale Esber	Labor
David Hull	Liberal
Hugo Robinson	Liberal
Ned Cutcher	Greens

2021 New South Wales local elections: Burwood
Party	Candidate	Votes	%	±%
	Labor	9,002	52.2	+1.1
	Liberal	4,050	23.5	−2.4
	Greens	2,196	12.7	+12.7
	Independent	1,277	7.4	+7.4
	Major Independent Group	725	4.2	+4.2
Total formal votes		17,250	94.4	
Informal votes		1,030	5.6	
Turnout		18,280	87.0	
Party total seats			Seats	±
	Labor		3	Steady
	Liberal		2	Steady
	Greens		1	▲1

== Camden ==
2021 New South Wales local elections: Camden
Party	Votes	%	Swing	Seats	Change
Liberal	27,148	44.0	+12.0	4	Steady
Labor	20,351	33.0	+8.0	3	Steady
Independent	13,913	22.5	−20.5	2	Steady
Shooters, Fishers and Farmers	314	0.5	+0.5	0	Steady
Formal votes	61,726	94.58			
Informal votes	3,537	5.42			
Total	65,263	100.0			

=== Central ===
Elected councillor	Party
Therese Fedeli	Liberal
Ashleigh Cagney	Labor
Peter McLean	Independent

2021 New South Wales local elections: Central
Party	Candidate	Votes	%	±%
	Liberal	8,708	42.0	
	Labor	7,539	36.4	
	Independent	4,488	21.6	
Total formal votes		20,735	94.7	
Informal votes		1,159	5.3	
Turnout		21,894	86.7	

=== North ===
Elected councillor	Party
Lara Symkowiak	Liberal
Cindy Cagney	Labor
Usha Dommaraju	Liberal

2021 New South Wales local elections: North
Party	Candidate	Votes	%	±%
Liberal		11,291	49.1	
Labor		8,119	35.3	
Independent (Group B)		2,266	9.9	
Independent (Group D)		710	3.1	
Shooters, Fishers, Farmers	Kadeja Assaad	314	1.4	
Independent	Muhammad Farooq	275	1.2	
Total formal votes		22,975	94.4	
Informal votes		1,366	5.6	
Turnout		24,341	86.0	

=== South ===
Elected councillor	Party
Russel Zammit	Liberal
Eva Campbell	Independent
Paul Farrow	Labor

2021 New South Wales local elections: South
Party	Candidate	Votes	%	±%
Liberal		7,149	39.7	
Independent (Group A)		5,849	32.5	
Labor		4,693	26.0	
Independent	Mick Jackson	256	1.4	
Independent	Valerie Tarela-Moyes	69	0.4	
Total formal votes		18,016	94.7	
Informal votes		1,012	5.3	
Turnout		19,028	85.2	

== Campbelltown ==
Elected councillor	Party
George Brticevic	Labor
Meg Oates	Labor
Darcy Lound	Labor
Margaret Chivers	Labor
Rey Manoto	Labor
Masood Chowdhury	Labor
Karen Hunt	Labor
George Greiss	Liberal
Marian George	Liberal
Riley Munro	Liberal
John Chew	Liberal
Matt Stellino	Animal Justice
Josh Cotter	Community First
Masud Khalil	Community Voice
Warren Morrison	TLCP

2021 New South Wales local elections: Campbelltown
Party	Candidate	Votes	%	±%
Labor		39,162	43.8	+0.5
Liberal		22,056	24.7	+8.2
Community First Team		7,561	8.5	−0.4
Totally Locally Committed		4,809	5.4	−4.6
Community Voice		4,388	4.9	
Animal Justice		4,261	4.8	+4.8
Greens		4,057	4.5	−0.4
Campbelltown Independents		2,857	3.2	
Independent	Mukesh Chand	98	0.1	
Independent	Mick Allen	88	0.1	
Total formal votes		89,337	93.7	
Informal votes		6,011	6.3	
Turnout		95,348	84.4	
Party total seats			Seats	±
Labor			7	Steady
Liberal			4	▲1
Community First Team			1	Steady
Totally Locally Committed			1	▼1
Community Voice			1	▲1
Animal Justice			1	▲1
Greens			0	▼1

Four councillors did not seek re-election:

- Ralph George (Liberal) − announced 3 November 2021
- Ted Rowell (Liberal) − announced 3 November 2021
- Paul Lake (Community First) − announced 3 November 2021
- Bob Thompson (Bob Thompson's Independent Team) − announced 3 November 2021

== Canada Bay ==
Elected councillor	Party
Michael Megna	Liberal
Stephanie Di Pasqua	Liberal
Anthony Bazouni	Liberal
Julia Little	Labor
Andrew Ferguson	Labor
Joseph Cordaro	OLC
Carmela Ruggeri	OLC
Charles Jago	Greens

2021 New South Wales local elections: Canada Bay
Party	Candidate	Votes	%	±%
	Liberal	14,126	29.8	−8.8
	Labor	13,917	29.3	−6.1
	Our Local Community	12,867	27.1	+27.1
	Greens	4,653	9.8	−1.5
	Independent	1,909	4.0	−4.2
Total formal votes		47,472	95.4	
Informal votes		2,312	4.6	
Turnout		49,784	85.6	
Party total seats			Seats	±
	Liberal		3	Steady
	Labor		2	▼1
	Our Local Community		2	▲2
	Greens		1	Steady
	Independent		0	▼1

== Canterbury Bankstown ==
2021 New South Wales local elections: Canterbury-Bankstown
Party	Votes	%	Swing	Seats	Change
Labor	83,724	47.4	+0.0	9	Steady
Liberal	52,960	30.0	+0.6	5	Steady
Greens	6,608	3.7	−4.8	0	▼1
Independent	16,221	9.1	+4.6	0	Steady
Barbara Coorey Independent Group	9,027	5.1	+5.1	1	▲1
Our Local Community	5,105	2.9	−7.2	0	Steady
Animal Justice	2,746	8.2	+8.2	0	Steady
Communist League	99	0.1		0	Steady
Formal votes	176,490				

=== Bankstown ===
Elected councillor	Party
Khal Asfour	Labor
Bilal El-Hayek	Labor
George Zakhia	Liberal

2021 New South Wales local elections: Bankstown
Party	Candidate	Votes	%	±%
	Labor	19,848	58.3	
	Liberal	10,412	30.6	
	Independent	3,802	11.2	
Total formal votes		34,062	93.5	
Informal votes		2,378	6.5	
Turnout		36,440	80.9	

=== Bass Hill ===
Elected councillor	Party
Rachelle Harika	Labor
Christopher Cahill	Labor
Charlie Ishac	Liberal

2021 New South Wales local elections: Bass Hill
Party	Candidate	Votes	%	±%
	Labor	17,194	51.9	
	Liberal	9,991	30.1	
	Independent	5,968	18.0	
Total formal votes		33,153	92.9	
Informal votes		2,547	7.1	
Turnout		35,700	80.3	

=== Canterbury ===
Elected councillor	Party
Clare Raffan	Labor
Jessie Nguyen	Liberal
Barbara Coorey	BCIG

2021 New South Wales local elections: Canterbury
Party	Candidate	Votes	%	±%
Labor		12,708	34.1	
Barbara Coorey Independent Group		9,027	24.2	+24.2
Liberal		8,834	23.7	
Greens		6,608	17.7	
Communist League	Linda Harris	99	0.3	
Total formal votes		37,276	94.2	
Informal votes		2,310	5.8	
Turnout		39,586	85.1	

=== Revesby ===
Elected councillor	Party
David Walsh	Labor
Linda Downey	Labor
Charbel Abouraad	Liberal

2021 New South Wales local elections: Revesby
Party	Candidate	Votes	%	±%
Labor		16,123	41.9	
Liberal		14,031	36.5	
Our Local Community		5,105	13.3	
Independent		2,758	7.2	
Independent	Chris Brogan	429	1.1	
Total formal votes		38,446	94.9	
Informal votes		2,080	5.1	
Turnout		40,526	86.3	

=== Roselands ===
Elected councillor	Party
Karl Saleh	Labor
Bhadra Waida	Labor
Sazeda Akter	Liberal

2021 New South Wales local elections: Roselands
Party	Candidate	Votes	%	±%
	Labor	17,851	53.2	
	Liberal	9,692	28.9	
	Independent	3,264	9.7	
	Animal Justice	2,746	8.2	+8.2
Total formal votes		33,553	92.5	
Informal votes		2,724	7.5	
Turnout		36,277	80.7	

== Cumberland ==
2021 Cumberland City Council election
- 4 December 2021

All 15 councillors on Cumberland City Council 8 seats needed for a majority
	First party	Second party	Third party
		OLC	IND
Party	Labor	OLC	Ind. Liberal
Last election	8 seats	2 seats	Did not contest
Seats before	6	3	5
Seats won	8	4	2
Seat change	▲2	▲1	▼3 (Note: Compared with the Liberal Party result at the 2017 election.)
First preference vote	47,343	27,547	12,467
Percentage	48.6%	28.3%	12.8
Swing	▲9.4	▲14.0	▼13.4
Largest party before election
Labor
Subsequent largest party
Labor

Cumberland City Council is composed of five three-member wards, totalling 15 councillors. At the 2017 election, Labor won a majority with eight seats.

In 2017, Greystanes Ward councillor Greg Cummings was suspended from Labor, and was expelled from the party in October 2018. In September 2019, Granville Ward councillor Steve Christou left Labor to join Our Local Community.

The Liberal Party did not endorse any candidates, leading its incumbent councillors to contest as Independent Liberals.

=== Cumberland results ===
2021 New South Wales local elections: Cumberland
Party	Votes	%	Swing	Seats	Change
Labor	47,343	48.6	+9.4	8	Steady
Our Local Community	27,547	28.3	+14.0	4	▲2
Independent Liberal	12,467	12.8	−13.4	2	▼3
The Independents	6,388	6.5	+6.5	1	▲1
Greens	2,748	2.8	+1.1	0	Steady
Independent	968	1.0		0	Steady
Formal votes	97,461	96.48			

=== Granville ===
Elected councillor	Party
Ola Hamed	Labor
Steve Christou	OLC
Joseph Rahme	Ind. Liberal

2021 New South Wales local elections: Granville Ward
Party	Candidate	Votes	%	±%
Labor		8,222	42.5	
Our Local Community		6,252	32.4	
Independent Liberal		4,274	22.1	
Independent	Carly Lewis	422	2.2	
Independent	Jacob Abraham	108	0.6	
Independent	Ibtisam Koreel	47	0.2	
Total formal votes		19,325	93.0	
Informal votes		1,447	7.0	
Turnout			79.8	

=== Greystanes ===
Elected councillor	Party
Diane Colman	Labor
Eddy Sarkis	OLC
Greg Cummings	The Independents

2021 New South Wales local elections: Greystanes Ward
Party	Candidate	Votes	%	±%
	Labor	6,838	32.9	
	Our Local Community	7,228	34.8	
	The Independents	6,388	30.7	+30.7
	Independent Liberal	325	1.6	
Total formal votes		20,779	93.9	
Informal votes		1,357	6.1	
Turnout			85.4	

=== Regents Park ===
Elected councillor	Party
Kun Huang	Labor
Sabrin Farooqui	Labor
Helen Hughes	OLC

2021 New South Wales local elections: Regents Park Ward
Party	Candidate	Votes	%	±%
Labor		11,789	59.7	
Our Local Community		4,307	21.8	
Independent Liberal		3,262	16.5	
Independent	Khaled Sunkesula	391	2.0	
Total formal votes		19,749	94.0	
Informal votes		1,267	6.0	
Turnout			84.9	

=== South Granville ===
Elected councillor	Party
Glenn Elmore	Labor
Mohamad Hussein	Labor
Paul Garrard	OLC

2021 New South Wales local elections: South Granville Ward
Party	Candidate	Votes	%	±%
	Labor	11,291	64.9	
	Our Local Community	6,106	35.1	
Total formal votes		17,397	92.1	
Informal votes		1,500	7.9	
Turnout		18,897	76.1	

=== Wentworthville ===
Elected councillor	Party
Suman Saha	Labor
Lisa Lake	Labor
Michael Zaiter	Ind. Liberal

2021 New South Wales local elections: Wentworthville Ward
Party	Candidate	Votes	%	±%
	Labor	9,203	45.5	
	Independent Liberal	4,606	22.8	
	Our Local Community	3,654	18.1	
	Greens	2,748	13.6	
Total formal votes		20,211	94.7	
Informal votes		1,134	5.3	
Turnout		21,345	83.4	

== Fairfield ==
2021 Fairfield City Council election
- 4 December 2021

All 12 seats on Fairfield City Council (Note: Excluding the mayor, who is directly-elected.) 7 seats needed for a majority
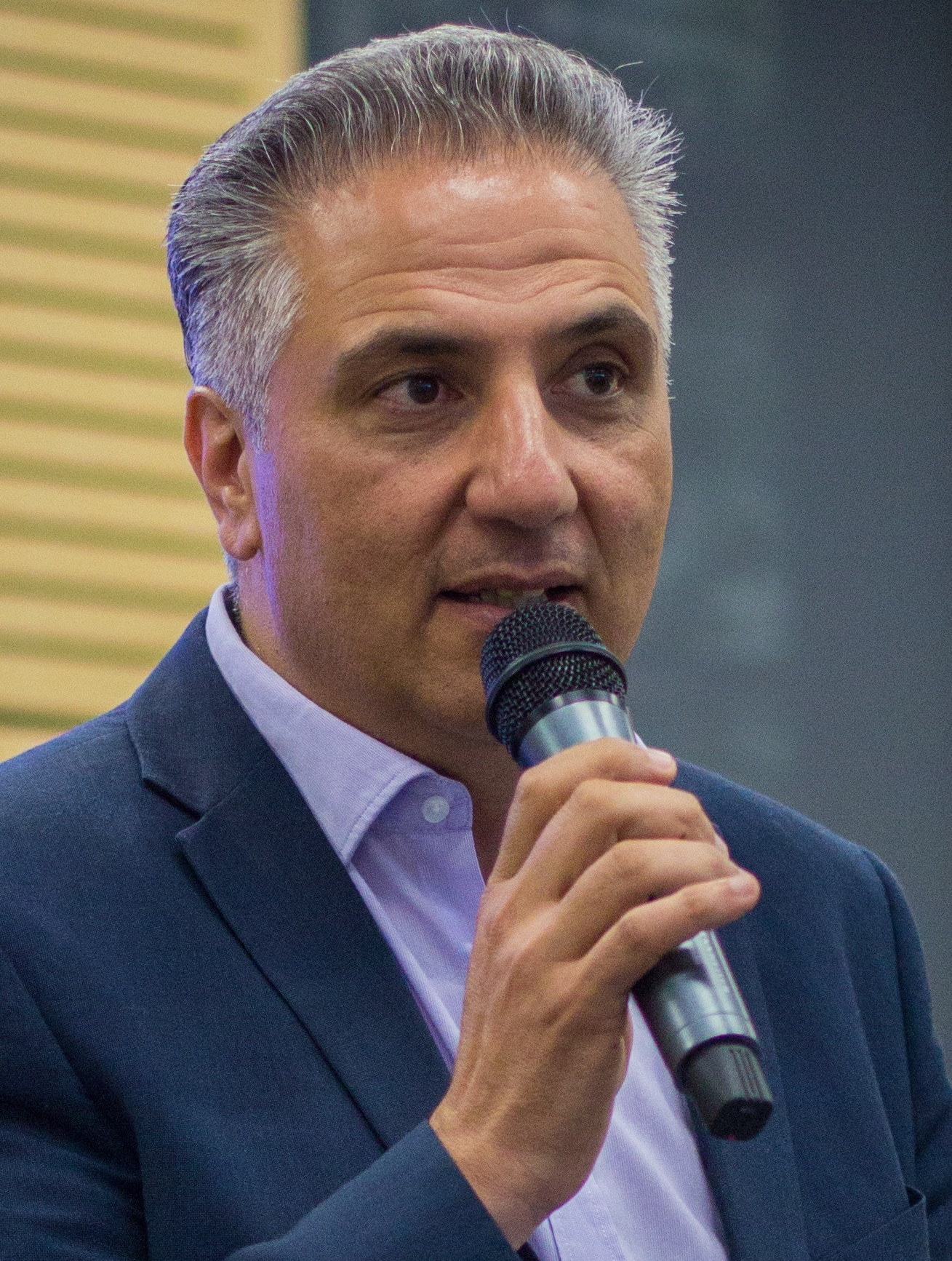

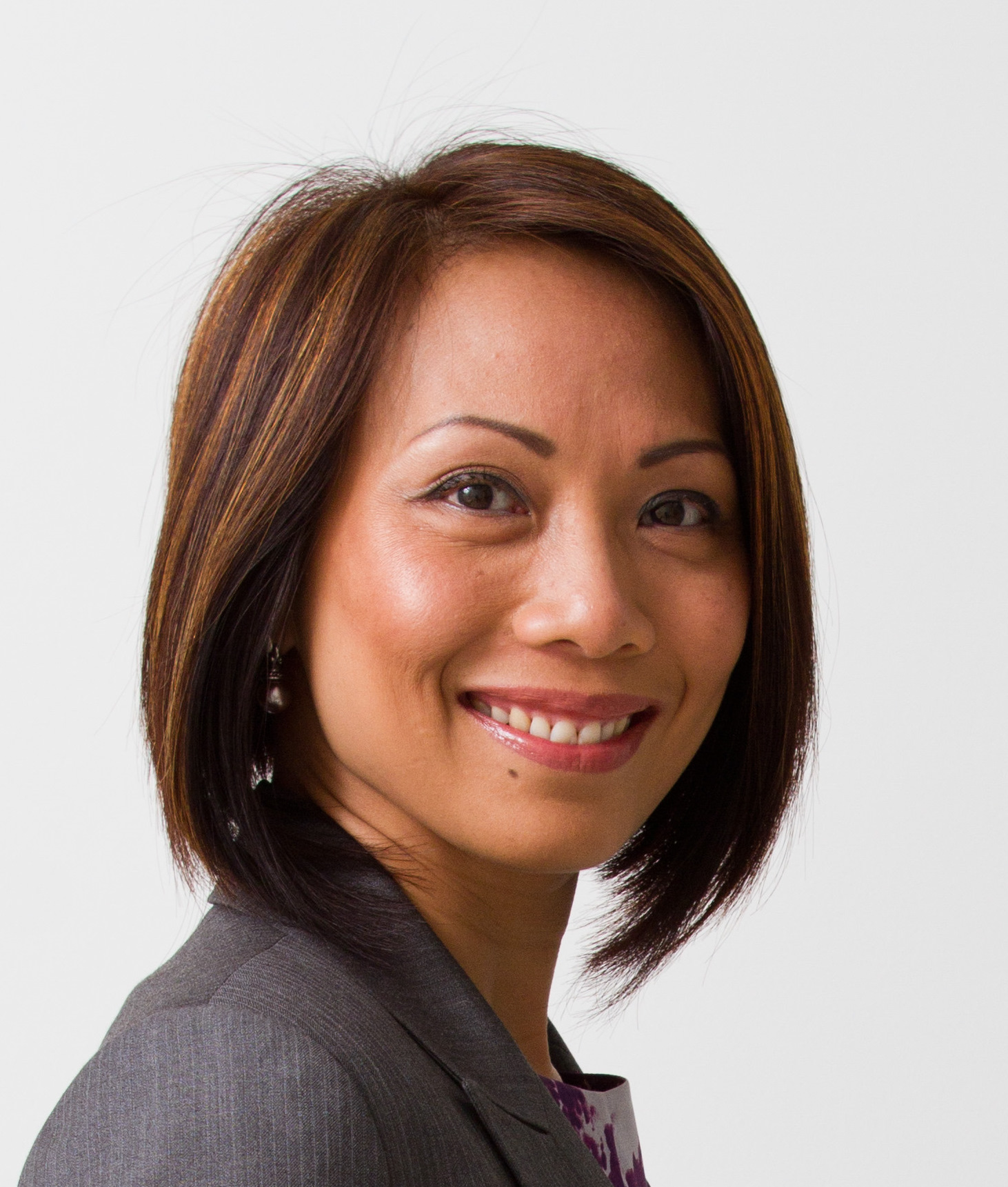

	First party	Second party	Third party
Leader	Frank Carbone	Dai Le	George Barcha
Party	Frank Carbone	Dai Le	Labor
Seats won	6	3	3
First preference vote	39,445	18,774	23,081
Percentage	42.5%	20.2%	24.9%
Swing			▼20.2
Largest party before election
Labor
Subsequent largest party
Carbone-Le Alliance

Fairfield City Council is composed of two six-member wards, as well as a directly-elected mayor.

The Liberal Party did not endorse any candidates, including its three councillors elected in 2016.

The election was conducted by the Australian Election Company.

Although Frank Carbone and Dai Le formed their own groups, they have an alliance on council.

=== Fairfield results ===
2021 New South Wales local elections: Fairfield
Party	Votes	%	Swing	Seats	Change
Frank Carbone	39,445	42.5		6	
Dai Le	18,774	20.2		3	
Labor	23,081	24.9	−20.2	3	▼3
The Real Local	3,468	3.7	+3.7	0	Steady
Independent	3,007	3.2		0	
Our Local Community	2,880	3.1	+3.1	0	Steady
Independent Liberal	2,207	2.4	−16.1 (Note: Compared with the Liberal Party result at the 2016 election.)	0	▼3
Formal votes	92,862				

=== Fairfield/Cabravale ===
2021 New South Wales local elections: Fairfield/Cabravale Ward
Party	Candidate	Votes	%	±%
Frank Carbone	1. Charbel Saliba (elected); 2. Milovan Karajcic (elected); 3. Emmanuel Brikha; 4. Antonio Carbone; 5. Annie Tran; 6. Rita Paul Matti	14,975	31.6	
Dai Le	1. Dai Le (elected); 2. Kevin Lam (elected); 3. Joline Korkis; 4. Miranda Garcia Jose; 5. Sue Lee Lim; 6. Ngoc My Tang	13,047	27.5	+27.5
Labor	1. Carmen Lazar (elected); 2. Kien Ly (elected); 3. Lawrence White; 4. Luis Borges; 5. Abrahem Wannous; 6. Shawn Anfernee Lu	12,838	27.0	
The Real Local	1. Basim Shamaon; 2. Anthony Nguyen; 3. Dunya Lazar; 4. Buhendwa Ozegbe Navazu; 5. Abdal Abdal; 6. Hikmet Nessan Eliaa	3,468	7.3	+7.3
Independent	1. Andrew Nghiep Nguyen; 2. Jolet Youkhana; 3. Thanh Nha Ly; 4. Kim-Hong Meas; 5. Tiffany Luu; 6. Jenny Lam	2,988	6.3	
Independent Liberal	Lachlan Hyde	129	0.3	
Independent	Huu Tam Luong	19	0.0	
Total formal votes		47,464		
Turnout			70.6	

- Paul Azzo (Liberal) did not seek re-election

=== Parks ===
2021 New South Wales local elections: Parks Ward
Party	Candidate	Votes	%	±%
Frank Carbone	1. Frank Carbone; 2. Reni Barkho (elected); 3. Hugo Morvillo (elected); 4. Michael Mijaiovic (elected); 5. Marie Saliba (elected); 6. Martina Hanna	24,470	53.9	
Labor	1. George Barcha (elected); 2. Ninos Khoshaba; 3. Sera Mesude Yilmaz; 4. Tri Vo; 5. Joan Pellegrino; 6. Mickey Ngo	10,243	22.6	
Dai Le	1. Andrew Rohan (elected); 2. Wendy Chuyen Tran; 3. Ly Huynh Nguyen; 4. Thi Lyfa Thach; 5. Rebecca Di Noia; 6. Benjamin Saliba	5,727	12.6	+12.6
Our Local Community	1. Samir Yousif; 2. Vedran Maric; 3. Saul Soto; 4. George Korkis; 5. Marlin Toma; 6. David Nguyen	2,880	6.3	+6.3
Independent Liberal	1. Peter Grippaudo; 2. Marko Pavlovic; 3. Rabi Harmes; 4. Tan Dat Le; 5. Danny Mona; 6. Mark Masling	2,078	4.6	
Total formal votes		45,398		
Turnout			73.6	

- Joe Molluso (Liberal) did not seek re-election

== Georges River ==
2021 Georges River Council election
- 4 December 2021

All 15 councillors on Georges River Council 8 seats needed for a majority

	First party	Second party	Third party
			R&R
Party	Labor	Liberal	GRRRP
Last election	6 seats	5 seats	Did not exist
Seats before	6	5	0
Seats won	5	5	4
Seat change	▼1	Steady	▲4
First preference vote	25,064	22,459	16,607
Percentage	32.4%	29.0%	21.4%
Swing	▼5.7	▼4.6%	▲21.4
Largest party before election
Labor
Subsequent largest party
No overall control

Georges River Council is composed of five three-member wards, totalling 15 councillors. At the 2017 election, Labor won a plurality with six seats.

=== Georges River results ===
2021 New South Wales local elections: Georges River
Party	Votes	%	Swing	Seats	Change
Labor	25,064	32.4	−5.7	5	▼1
Liberal	22,459	29.0	−4.6	5	Steady
Residents and Ratepayers	16,607	21.4	+21.4	4	▲4
Independents	10,279	13.3	−5.1	0	▼3
Georges River Association	2,105	2.7	+2.7	1	▲1
Kogarah Residents' Association	919	1.2	−3.4	0	▼1
Communist League	17	0.0	+0.0	0	Steady
Formal votes	77,450	94.56			
Informal votes	4,456	5.44			
Total	81,906	100.00			

=== Blakehurst ===
Elected councillor	Party
Sam Elmir	Liberal
Natalie Mort	GRRRP
Kathryn Landsberry	Labor

2021 New South Wales local elections: Blakehurst Ward
Party	Candidate	Votes	%	±%
	Liberal	5,109	31.7	
	Residents and Ratepayers	4,276	26.5	+26.5
	Labor	3,963	24.6	
	Independent (Group D)	2,218	13.7	
	Independent (Group C)	576	3.6	
Total formal votes		16,142	95.3	
Informal votes		795	4.7	
Turnout		16,937	87.7	

=== Hurstville ===
Elected councillor	Party
Colleen Symington	Labor
Nancy Liu	Liberal
Benjamin Wang	GRA

2021 New South Wales local elections: Hurstville Ward
Party	Candidate	Votes	%	±%
Labor		4,468	30.2	
Liberal		3,579	24.2	
Georges River Association		2,105	14.2	+14.2
Residents and Ratepayers		1,617	10.9	+10.9
Independent (Group A)		1,638	11.1	
Independent (Group D)		1,349	9.1	
Communist League	Robert Aiken	17	0.1	+0.1
Total formal votes		14,773	93.4	
Informal votes		1,039	6.6	
Turnout		15,812	85.9	

=== Kogarah Bay ===
Elected councillor	Party
Nick Katris	Labor
Elise Borg	GRRRP
Sam Stratikopoulos	Liberal

2021 New South Wales local elections: Kogarah Bay Ward
Party	Candidate	Votes	%	±%
Labor		4,653	29.5	
Residents and Ratepayers		3,681	23.3	+23.3
Liberal		3,667	23.2	
Independent		2,823	17.9	
Kogarah Residents' Association		919	5.8	
Independent	Greg McAleer	54	0.3	
Total formal votes		15,797	93.9	
Informal votes		1,029	6.1	
Turnout		16,826	84.3	

=== Mortdale ===
Elected councillor	Party
Warren Tegg	Labor
Nick Smerdely	Liberal
Christina Jamieson	GRRRP

2021 New South Wales local elections: Mortdale Ward
Party	Candidate	Votes	%	±%
Labor		5,054	35.0	
Liberal		4,908	34.0	
Residents and Ratepayers		3,044	21.1	+21.1
Independent (Group D)		866	6.0	
Independent (Group B)		327	2.3	
Independent	David Perry	128	0.9	
Independent	Christian Stojkov	84	0.6	
Independent	Damian Cook	41	0.3	
Total formal votes		14,452	94.3	
Informal votes		880	5.7	
Turnout		15,332	86.5	

=== Peakhurst ===
Elected councillor	Party
Kevin Greene	Labor
Lou Konjarski	Liberal
Peter Mahoney	GRRRP

2021 New South Wales local elections: Peakhurst Ward
Party	Candidate	Votes	%	±%
Labor		6,926	42.5	
Liberal		5,196	31.9	
Residents and Ratepayers		3,989	24.5	+24.5
Independent	Dina Ghazal	175	1.1	
Total formal votes		16,286	95.8	
Informal votes		713	4.2	
Turnout		16,999	87.1	

== Hawkesbury ==
Elected councillor	Party
Sarah McMahon	Liberal
Patrick Conolly	Liberal
Paul Veigel	Liberal
Jill Reardon	Liberal
Barry Calvert	Labor
Amanda Kotlash	Labor
Mary Lyons-Buckett	People Not Parties
Nathan Zamprogno	Ind. Liberal
Les Sheather	Les and The Doc
Shane Djuric	SFF
Danielle Wheeler	Greens
Eddie Dogramaci	Small Business

2021 New South Wales local elections: Hawkesbury
Party	Candidate	Votes	%	±%
Liberal		13,577	34.3	+6.0
Labor		4,783	12.1	−4.3
People Not Parties		3,846	9.7	
Independent Liberal		3,357	8.5	
Les and The Doc		2,916	7.4	
Shooters, Fishers, Farmers		2,821	7.1	+7.1
Greens		2,795	7.1	−0.8
Small Business		1,899	4.8	+4.8
Andrew Cadman Group		1,070	2.7	
Independent		947	2.4	
Hawkesbury Alliance		944	2.4	
The Locals		448	1.1	
Independent	John Ross	85	0.2	
Total formal votes		39,488	94.9	
Informal votes		2,135	5.1	
Turnout		41,623	86.1	

== Hornsby ==
2021 New South Wales local elections: Hornsby
Party	Votes	%	Swing	Seats	Change
Liberal	42,748	50.2	+6.3	6	▲4
Greens	23,904	28.1	+9.1	3	▲1
Labor	11,755	13.0	−3.8	0	▼2
Independent	6,664	7.8	−12.3	0	▼1
Formal votes	85,071	96.89			
Informal votes	2,732	3.11			
Total	87,803	100.00			

=== A Ward ===
Elected councillor	Party
Nathan Tilbury	Liberal
Warren Waddell	Liberal
Tania Salitra	Greens

2021 New South Wales local elections: A Ward
Party	Candidate	Votes	%	±%
	Liberal	14,496	50.4	
	Greens	6,368	22.2	
	Labor	5,145	17.9	
	Independent	2,725	9.5	
Total formal votes		28,734	96.3	
Informal votes		1,111	3.7	
Turnout		29,845	88.8	

=== B Ward ===
Elected councillor	Party
Sallianne McClelland	Liberal
Monika Ball	Greens
Janelle McIntosh	Labor

2021 New South Wales local elections: B Ward
Party	Candidate	Votes	%	±%
	Liberal	13,733	48.6	
	Greens	7,930	28.0	
	Labor	6,610	23.4	
Total formal votes		28,273	97.2	
Informal votes		817	2.8	
Turnout		29,090	86.5	

- Joe Nicita (Greens) moved from B Ward to C Ward to contest as the second candidate on independent councillor Vince del Gallego's ticket

=== C Ward ===
Elected councillor	Party
Verity Greenwood	Liberal
Sreeni Pillamarri	Liberal
Emma Heyde	Greens

2021 New South Wales local elections: C Ward
Party	Candidate	Votes	%	±%
	Liberal	14,519	51.7	
	Greens	9,606	34.2	
	Independent	3,939	14.0	
Total formal votes		28,064	97.2	
Informal votes		804	2.8	
Turnout		28,868	89.6	

== Ku-ring-gai ==
2021 New South Wales local elections: Ku-ring-gai
Party	Votes	%	Swing	Seats	Change
Independent	39,069	56.8		6	
Your Voice on Local Issues	6,863	10.0		1	
Independent Liberal/Independent joint ticket	6,053	8.8		0	
Independent Liberal	5,908	8.6		2	
Preserve Ku-ring-gai	2,600	3.8		1	
Greg Cook & Tori Huxtable	2,455	3.6		0	
Liberal Democrats	1,840	3.6		0	
Roshan Wickremanayake Group	1,729	2.5		0	
Comenarra Independents	1,170	1.7		0	
Campaign for Comenarra	1,075	1.6		0	
Formal votes	68,762	94.94			
Informal votes	3,665	5.06			
Turnout	72,427				

=== Comenarra ===
2021 New South Wales local elections: Comenarra Ward
Party	Candidate	Votes	%	±%
Independent	1. Jeff Pettett (elected); 2. Trish Lynch	5,362	38.8	
Independent	1. Greg Taylor (elected); 2. Mackenzie Sloan	3,044	22.1	
Roshan Wickremanayake Group	1. Roshan Wickremanayake (Ind. Lib); 2. Shavera Gunasekera; 3. Cameron Smith	1,729	12.5	
Independent Liberal/Independent joint ticket	1. Gurdeep Singh (Ind. Lib); 2. Avtar Kaur	1,424	10.3	
Comenarra Independents	1. Boru Tumulty; 2. Ali Rabieli	1,170	8.5	
Campaign for Comenarra	1. Jayamala Gupte (Ind. Lib); 2. Kay Smede	1,075	7.8	
Total formal votes		13,804	94.7	
Informal votes		770	5.3	
Turnout		14,574	87.7	

=== Gordon ===
2021 New South Wales local elections: Gordon Ward
Party	Candidate	Votes	%	±%
Independent	1. Barbara Ward (elected); 2. Mike Le	6,802	49.6	
Preserve Ku-ring-gai	1. Simon Lennon (Ind. Lib) (elected); 2. Philip Hext	2,600	19.0	
Greg Cook & Tori Huxtable	1. Greg Cook; 2. Tori Huxtable	2,455	17.9	
Independent	1. Peter Kelly; 2. Anthony Carnovale	1,863	13.6	
Total formal votes		13,720	94.0	
Informal votes		883	6.0	
Turnout		14,603	86.2	

=== Roseville ===
2021 New South Wales local elections: Roseville Ward
Party	Candidate	Votes	%	±%
Your Voice on Local Issues	1. Sam Ngai (Ind. Lib) (elected); 2. Amanda Blackman; 3. Mitchell Frater-Baird (Ind. Lib)	6,863	49.8	
Independent	1. Alec Taylor (elected); 2. Shankari Nadanachandran	3,308	24.0	
Independent Liberal/Independent joint ticket	1. Jennifer Anderson (Ind. Lib); 2. Annelie Kvisle	2,606	18.9	
Independent Liberal/Independent joint ticket	1. Anthony Ching (Ind. Lib); 2. Carmel Heffernan	1,008	7.3	
Total formal votes		13,785	96.1	
Informal votes		560	3.9	
Turnout		14,345	87.1	

=== St Ives ===
2021 New South Wales local elections: St Ives Ward
Party	Candidate	Votes	%	±%
Independent	1. Martin Smith (elected); 2. Anna-Lisa Ryan	6,977	50.1	
Independent Liberal	1. Christine Kay (elected); 2. Alexia Silver	2,974	21.3	
Independent Liberal/Independent joint ticket	1. Henry Song (Ind. Lib); 2. Joseph Audet	2,349	16.9	
Independent Liberal/Independent joint ticket	1. Amanda Brien (Ind. Lib); 2. David Howard	1,640	11.8	
Total formal votes		13,940	94.7	
Informal votes		781	5.3	
Turnout		14,721	89.2	

=== Wahroonga ===
2021 New South Wales local elections: Wahroonga Ward
Party	Candidate	Votes	%	±%
Independent	1. Kim Wheatley (elected); 2. Lisa Dixon	3,767	27.9	
Independent Liberal	1. Cedric Spencer (elected); 2. Tony Pang	2,934	21.7	
Independent	1. Sarah Beresford; 2. Donna Greenfield	2,203	16.3	
Liberal Democrats	1. Mitchell Strahan; 2. Nathaniel Bryan	1,840	13.6	
Independent	1. Sheri Evans; 2. Anne Matheson	1,660	12.3	
Independent	1. Adrienne McLean; 2. Elizabeth McLean	1,109	8.2	
Total formal votes		13,513	95.3	
Informal votes		671	4.7	
Turnout		14,184	87.4	

== Liverpool ==
2021 New South Wales local elections: Liverpool
Party	Candidate	Votes	%	±%
	Liberal	42,115	38.4	+3.1
	Labor	41,732	38.1	−2.6
	Community Independents	10,803	9.9	−4.5
	Independent	7,504	6.8	+2.8
	Greens	7,379	6.7	+1.1

=== North ===
2021 New South Wales local elections: North Ward
Party	Candidate	Votes	%	±%
Labor	1. Nathan Hagarty (elected); 2. Ali Karnib (elected); 3. Loraine Usher; 4. Ethan Monaghan; 5. Christopher Stanley	20,036	39.0	
Liberal	1. Hadid Mazhar (elected); 2. Mel Goodman (elected); 3. Paul Zadro; 4. Courtney Nguyen; 5. Tony Estephen	17,892	34.8	
Community Independents	1. Peter Harle (elected); 2. Criss Moore; 3. Marc Conners; 4. Briana Jocic; 5. Rayman Solagna	5,713	11.1	
Greens	1. Avery Howard; 2. Abdul Ayubi; 3. Saad Salman; 4. Suriani Ibrahim; 5. Md Rashid	4,506	8.8	
Independent	1. Milomir Andjelkovic; 2. Natalija Ryan; 3. Vasilije Bakovic; 4. Marella Harris; 5. Robert Pinosa	3,198	6.2	
Total formal votes		51,345	90.3	
Informal votes		5,519	9.7	
Turnout		56,864	82.0	

=== South ===
2021 New South Wales local elections: South Ward
Party	Candidate	Votes	%	±%

== Parramatta ==
The Liberal Party did not endorse any candidates, including its six councillors elected in 2017.

2021 New South Wales local elections: Parramatta
Party	Votes	%	Swing	Seats	Change
Labor	46,022	41.5	+10.3	7	▲2
Our Local Community	21,476	19.4	+12.3	4	▲2
Greens	11,233	10.1	+2.7	1	Steady
Lorraine Wearne Independents	9,423	8.5	+4.4	1	Steady
Independent Liberal	6,310	5.7	−30.8 (Note: Compared with the Liberal Party result at the 2017 election.)	1	▼5
Kellie Darley Independents	4,637	4.2	+4.2	1	▲1
Lee Malkoun Independents	3,489	3.1	−5.9 (Note: Compared with The Local Independent Party result at the 2017 election.)	0	Steady
Small Business	3,126	2.8	+2.8	0	Steady
Liberal Democrats	2,161	2.0	+2.0	0	Steady
Independent	1,882	1.7		0	
Community Need Not Corporate Greed	1,026	0.9	+0.9	0	Steady
Formal votes	110,785	95.23			
Informal votes	5,547	4.77			
Total	116,332	100.0			

=== Dundas ===
Elected councillor	Party
Pierre Esber	Labor
Michelle Garrard	OLC
Kellie Darley	Kellie Darley Inds

2021 New South Wales local elections: Dundas
Party	Candidate	Votes	%	±%
	Labor	8,278	37.5	
	Our Local Community	5,672	25.7	
	Kellie Darley Independents	4,637	21.0	+21.0
	Lee Malkoun Independents	3,489	15.8	+1.9
Total formal votes		22,076	94.33	
Informal votes		1,327	5.67	
Turnout		23,403	83.55	

=== Epping ===
Elected councillor	Party
Donna Davis	Labor
Lorraine Wearne	Lorraine Wearne Inds
Cameron Maclean	Labor

2021 New South Wales local elections: Epping
Party	Candidate	Votes	%	±%
Labor		12,156	51.8	
Lorraine Wearne Independents		9,423	40.2	
Independent	Jean Pierre Abood	1,882	8.0	
Total formal votes		23,461	95.49	
Informal votes		1,108	4.51	
Turnout		24,569	87.93	

=== North Rocks ===
Elected councillor	Party
Angela Humphries	Labor
Georgina Valjak	Ind. Liberal
Donna Wang	OLC

2021 New South Wales local elections: North Rocks
Party	Candidate	Votes	%	±%
	Labor	7,541	33.5	
	Independent Liberal	6,310	28.0	−20.2
	Our Local Community	5,528	24.5	
	Greens	3,146	14.0	
Total formal votes		22,525	95.95	
Informal votes		949	4.04	
Turnout		23,474	87.52	

=== Parramatta ===
Elected councillor	Party
Sameer Pandey	Labor
Henry Green	OLC
Phil Bradley	Greens

2021 New South Wales local elections: Parramatta
Party	Candidate	Votes	%	±%
	Labor	8,412	41.2	
	Our Local Community	5,749	28.1	
	Greens	4,118	20.1	
	Liberal Democrats	2,161	10.6	+10.6
Total formal votes		20,440	94.71	
Informal votes		1,141	5.29	
Turnout		21,581	80.98	

=== Rosehill ===
Elected councillor	Party
Patricia Prociv	Labor
Dan Siviero	OLC
Paul Noack	Labor

2021 New South Wales local elections: Rosehill
Party	Candidate	Votes	%	±%
	Labor	9,635	43.2	
	Our Local Community	4,527	20.3	
	Greens	3,969	17.8	
	Small Business	3,126	14.0	+14.0
	Community Need Not Corporate Greed	1,026	4.6	+4.6
Total formal votes		22,283	95.61	
Informal votes		1,022	4.39	
Turnout		23,305	78.53	

== Northern Beaches ==
2021 New South Wales local elections: Northern Beaches
Party	Votes	%	Swing	Seats	Change
Liberal	52,325	35.1		5	Steady
Your Northern Beaches	46,355	31.1		6	Steady
Greens	18,554	12.4		2	▲1
Labor	9,709	6.5		0	Steady
Good For Manly	6,629	4.4		1	Steady
True Independents	5,103	3.4		1	Steady
Independents	6,608	4.4		0	▼1
Formal votes	149,114	96.8			
Informal votes	4,934	3.2			
Total	154,048	100.0		15	
Registered voters / turnout	183,478	84.0	+4.5		

=== Curl Curl ===
2021 New South Wales local elections: Curl Curl Ward
Party	Candidate	Votes	%	±%
Your Northern Beaches	1. Sue Heins (elected 1); 2. Louise Hislop; 3. Ben Grozier	10,287	34.6	+2.4
Liberal	1. David Walton (elected 2); 2. Lee Furlong; 3. Vicky McGahey	10,074	33.9	+8.3
Greens	1. Kristyn Glanville (elected 3); 2. Jane Easton; 3. Judy Lambert	4,731	15.9	−0.1
Labor	1. Brandt Clifford; 2. Abby Harris; 3. Brandon Perrett-Hale	4,650	15.6	+1.6
Total formal votes		29,742	96.6	+2.4
Informal votes		1,039	3.4	−2.4
Turnout		30,781	81.7	+4.5

=== Frenchs Forest ===
2021 New South Wales local elections: Frenchs Forest Ward
Party	Candidate	Votes	%	±%
Your Northern Beaches	1. Michael Regan (elected 1); 2. Jose Menano-Pires (elected 3); 3. Sarah Baker; 4. Roslyn Harrison	13,698	44.7	−7.7
Liberal	1. Stuart Sprott (elected 2); 2. David Lovell; 3. Marcus Middleton	11,389	37.2	+0.5
Greens	1. Christopher Burns; 2. Susan Denham; 3. Felicity Davis	4,186	13.7	new
Independent	1. Chris Sharpe; 2. Monica Clonda; 3. Tricia Sharpe	1,352	4.41	new
Total formal votes		30,625	96.9	+1.3
Informal votes		971	3.1	−1.3
Turnout		31,596	87.6	+4.8

=== Manly ===
2021 New South Wales local elections: Manly Ward
Party	Candidate	Votes	%	±%
Liberal	1. Georgia Ryburn (elected 1); 2. Bill Calcraft; 3. Isabella Anderson	8,605	29.7	−0.7
Your Northern Beaches	1. Sarah Grattan (elected 2); 2. Chris Jackson; 3. Piper Harrison	6,804	23.5	+4.9
Good For Manly	1. Candy Bingham (elected 3); 2. Scott Porter; 3. Sonia Walsh	6,629	22.9	−7.4
Greens	1. Pamela Dawes; 2. Cathy Griffin; 3. Terrance Le Roux	3,529	12.2	−3.0
Labor	1. Sam Pigram; 2. Carolyn Howells; 3. Michael Bochner	2,393	8.3	+2.6
Independent	1. John Kelly; 2. James Brodie; 3. Maryann Novakovic	1,021	3.5	new
Total formal votes		28,981	97.4	+0.5
Informal votes		766	2.6	−0.5
Turnout		29,747	82.0	+5.4

=== Narrabeen ===
2021 New South Wales local elections: Narrabeen Ward
Party	Candidate	Votes	%	±%
Liberal	1. Bianca Crvelin (elected 1); 2. Jonathon Flegg; 3. Sarah Halnan	9,779	32.5	+0.7
Your Northern Beaches	1. Ruth Robins (elected 2); 2. Matt Adderton; 3. Sean Morgan	8,677	28.8	−0.3
True Independents	1. Vincent De Luca (elected 3); 2. Robert Giltian; 3. Tammy Cook	5,103	16.9	−3.3
Greens	1. Ethan Hrnjak; 2. Joanna Burnett; 3. Amanda Mooy	3,831	12.7	new
Labor	1. Paula Goodman; 2. Jared Turkington; 3. Galileo West	2,666	8.9	−1.4
Independent	Gregory Marr	39	0.1	new
Independent	Richard Harris	29	0.1	new
Total formal votes		30,124	96.2	+2.1
Informal votes		1,189	3.8	−2.1
Turnout		31,313	85.2	+3.6

=== Pittwater ===
2021 New South Wales local elections: Pittwater Ward
Party	Candidate	Votes	%	±%
Liberal	1. Rory Amon (elected 1); 2. Karina Page; 3. Philip Longley	12,478	42.1	+12.1
Your Northern Beaches	1. Michael Gencher (elected 2); 2. Sarah Turnbull; 3. Ian White	6,889	23.2	+8.4
Greens	1. Miranda Korzy (elected 3); 2. India Turner; 3. Pru Wawn	6,108	20.6	+8.7
Independent	1. Alex McTaggart; 2. Colleen Uren; 3. Robert Hopton	3,758	12.7	−3.9
Independent	James Ricketson	409	1.4	new
Total formal votes		29,642	96.8	+1.6
Informal votes		969	3.2	−1.6
Turnout		30,611	83.5	+4.1

== Penrith ==
The election was conducted by the Australian Election Company.

2021 New South Wales local elections: Penrith
Party	Votes	%	Swing	Seats	Change
Labor	36,376	34.5	–6.2	5	
Liberal	35,081	33.3	+2.9	6	
Independent	10,336	9.8			
Sue Day Independent	6,859	6.5		1	
The North Ward Independents	5,820	5.5		1	
MARCUS CORNISH	3,868	3.7			
WE DESERVE BETTER	3,073	2.9		1	
Australia First	2,549	2.4	+2.4		
People Before Politics	1,534	1.5			
Formal votes	105,496				

=== East ===
Elected councillor	Party
Bernard Bratusa	Liberal
Tricia Hitchen	Liberal
Todd Carney	Labor
Robin Cook	Labor
Marlene Shipley	WE DESERVE BETTER

2021 New South Wales local elections: East Ward
Party	Candidate	Votes	%	±%
	Labor	13,227	39.9	
	Liberal	10,456	31.5	
	WE DESERVE BETTER	3,073	9.3	
	Australia First	2,549	7.7	
	Independent	2,330	7.0	
	People Before Politics	1,534	4.6	
Total formal votes		33,169		

=== North ===
Elected councillor	Party
Ross Fowler	Liberal
Glenn Gardiner	Liberal
John Thain	Labor
Jonathan Pullen	Labor
Kevin Crameri	North Ward Inds

2021 New South Wales local elections: North Ward
Party	Candidate	Votes	%	±%
	Labor	12,455	33.8	
	Liberal	12,207	33.2	
	The North Ward Independents	5,820	15.8	
	MARCUS CORNISH	3,868	10.5	
	Independent	2,455	6.7	
Total formal votes		36,805	72.7	

=== South ===
Elected councillor	Party
Mark Davies	Liberal
Mark Rusev	Liberal
Karen McKeown	Labor
Sue Day	Sue Day
Jim Aitken	Independent

2021 New South Wales local elections: South Ward
Party	Candidate	Votes	%	±%
Liberal		12,418	35.0	
Labor		10,694	30.1	
Sue Day Independent		6,859	19.3	
Independent		5,441	15.3	
Independent	Abigail Nash	110	0.3	
Total formal votes		35,522	74.8	
