= Results of the 2021 New South Wales local elections =

← 2016 ← 2017	4 December 2021	2024 →

This is a list of results for the 2021 New South Wales local elections.

== Results by LGA ==
- Results of the 2021 New South Wales local elections in Central West
- Results of the 2021 New South Wales local elections in Hunter
- Results of the 2021 New South Wales local elections in Illawarra
- Results of the 2021 New South Wales local elections in Inner Sydney
- Results of the 2021 New South Wales local elections in Mid North Coast
- Results of the 2021 New South Wales local elections in Murray and Far West
- Results of the 2021 New South Wales local elections in New England
- Results of the 2021 New South Wales local elections in Northern Rivers
- Results of the 2021 New South Wales local elections in Orana
- Results of the 2021 New South Wales local elections in Outer Sydney
- Results of the 2021 New South Wales local elections in Riverina
- Results of the 2021 New South Wales local elections in South Coast and Southern Inland

=== Individual LGAs ===
- 2021 Sydney City Council election

== Statewide results ==
Party	Votes	%	Swing	Seats (Note: Excluding directly-elected mayors.)	Change
Independents	1,392,142	33.73	–2.05	776	▼86
Labor	1,071,688	26.67	+1.05	188	▲3
Liberal	703,796	17.52	–7.99	127	▼13
Greens	355,196	8.84	+0.21	65	▲11
Independent Liberal	95,602	2.38	+1.08	8	▲3
Our Local Community	72,942	1.81	+0.08	10	▲6
Clover Moore Independent Team	47,877	1.19	–1.41	4	Steady
Your Northern Beaches	46,355	1.15	–8.00	6	Steady
Shoalhaven Independents Group	27,254	0.68	–0.63	4	▼1
Lake Mac Independents	24,922	0.62	–0.48	3	Steady
Dai Le	18,774	0.47	+0.47	3	▲3
Residents and Ratepayers	16,607	0.41	+0.41	4	▲4
Independent National	16,140	0.40		9	
Small Business	12,244	0.30	+0.30	1	▲1
Shooters, Fishers and Farmers	12,053	0.30	+0.12	5	▲3
Residents First Woollahra	10,951	0.27	–0.07	5	Steady
Liverpool Community Independents Team	10,803	0.27	–0.48	2	Steady
Animal Justice	9,724	0.24	+0.20	1	▲1
Lorraine Wearne Independents	9,423	0.24	+0.05	1	Steady
Community First Team	7,561	0.19	–0.22	1	Steady
Sustainable Australia	7,308	0.18	+0.18	2	▲2
Serving Mosman	6,870	0.17	–0.09	4	▲1
Good For Manly	6,629	0.17	–0.48	1	Steady
Ben Shields Team	5,687	0.14	+0.01	1	Steady
Totally Locally Committed	4,809	0.12	–0.33	1	▼1
Liberal Democrats	4,376	0.11	−0.09	0	▼1
Strathfield Independents	4,120	0.10	+0.03	2	▲1
Nella Hall Independents	3,298	0.09	–0.07	1	Steady
Independent Labor	2,892	0.08	–0.15	1	▼3
Our Sustainable Future	2,769	0.07	–0.19	1	Steady
Socialist Alliance	2,612	0.07	+0.05	0	Steady
Australia First	2,549	0.06	–0.10	0	Steady
Kogarah Residents Association	919	0.02	–0.14	0	▼1
Arts	536	0.01	+0.01	0	Steady
Science	536	0.01	+0.01	0	Steady
Communist League	116	0.01	+0.01	0	Steady
Independent One Nation	46	0.00	–0.16	0	▼1
Total	4,018,048	100.00	–	–	–
Registered voters / turnout	4,838,137	83.05	+6.45	–	–

== Maps ==
=== Statewide results ===
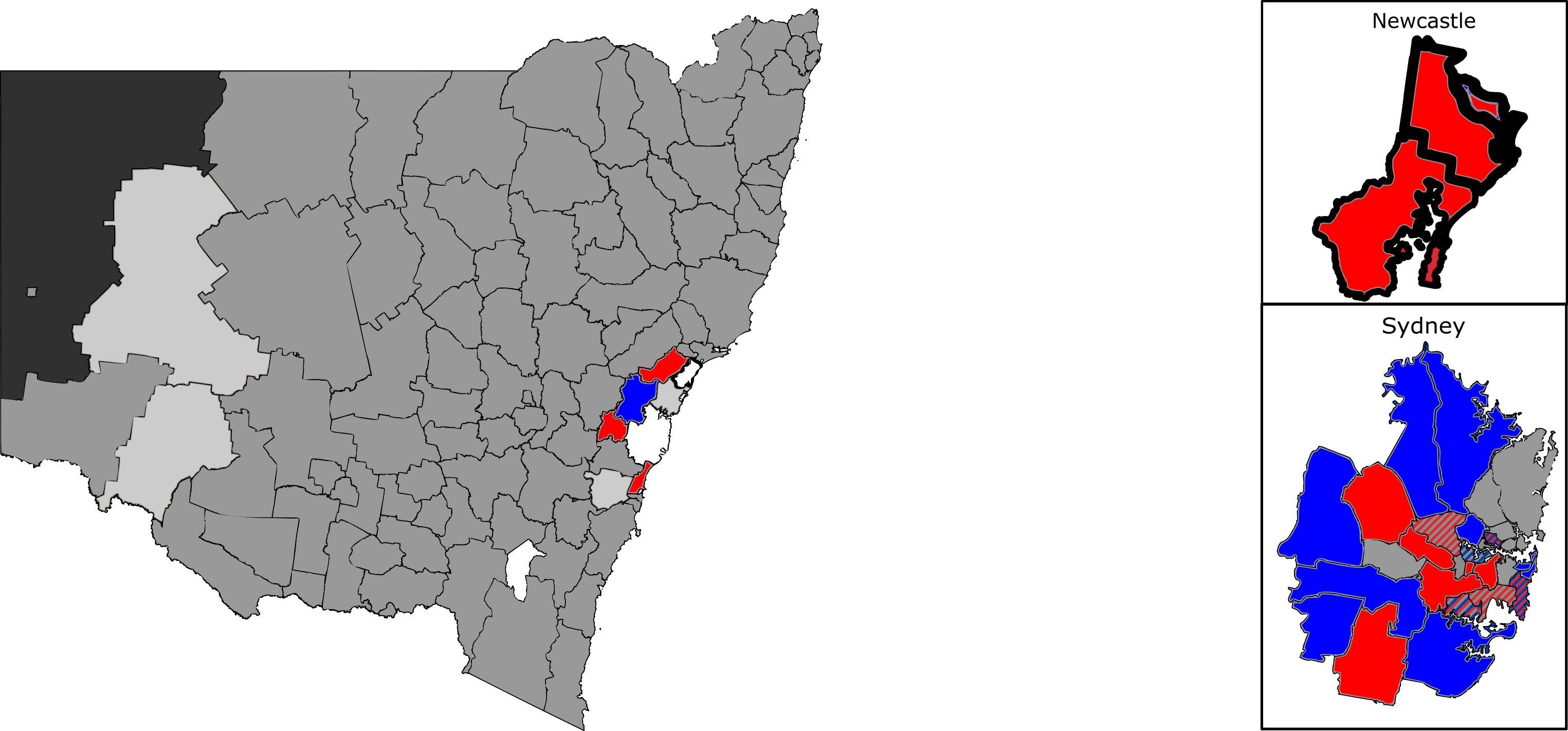
Results by largest winning party in each LGA

=== LGA results by ward ===
Blacktown

Blue Mountains

Hornsby

Hunter's Hill

Lane Cove

North Sydney

Northern Beaches

Parramatta

Penrith

Ryde

The Hills
