= Results of the 2016 New South Wales local elections =

← 2012	10 September 2016	2017 → 2021 →

This is a list of results for the 2016 New South Wales local elections.

== Results by LGA ==
=== LGAs by region ===
- Results of the 2016 New South Wales local elections in Central West
- Results of the 2016 New South Wales local elections in Hunter
- Results of the 2016 New South Wales local elections in Illawarra
- Results of the 2016 New South Wales local elections in Inner Sydney
- Results of the 2016 New South Wales local elections in Mid North Coast
- Results of the 2016 New South Wales local elections in Murray and Far West
- Results of the 2016 New South Wales local elections in New England
- Results of the 2016 New South Wales local elections in Northern Rivers
- Results of the 2016 New South Wales local elections in Orana
- Results of the 2016 New South Wales local elections in Outer Sydney
- Results of the 2016 New South Wales local elections in Riverina
- Results of the 2016 New South Wales local elections in South Coast and Southern Inland

=== Individual LGAs ===
- 2016 Sydney City Council election

== Statewide results ==
Party	Votes	%	Swing	Seats (Note: This does not include seats in 46 LGAs that were won in 2012 but not up for re-election until the 2017 local elections.) (Note: Excluding directly-elected mayors.)	Change
Independents	678,591	39.59	+1.45	545	
Labor	429,605	24.60	+5.43	81	
Liberal	286,013	16.40	−5.45	48	
Greens	110,491	6.35	−0.33	23	
Clover Moore Independent Team	45,224	2.60	+1.71	5	▲1
Independent National	40,896	2.35	+1.36	15	
Shoalhaven Independents	21,510	1.31	+0.98	5	▲2
Independent Liberal	21,364	1.30	−2.57	5	
Independent Lake Alliance	20,978	1.21	+0.44	1	▼3
Lake Mac Independents	19,036	1.10	+1.10	3	▲3
Christian Democrats	15,326	0.90	+0.49	0	Steady
Liverpool Community Independents Team	13,207	0.75	+0.54	2	▲1
Totally Locally Committed	7,865	0.45	+0.24	2	Steady
Community First	7,049	0.41	+0.25	1	Steady
Sydney Matters	6,051	0.35	+0.35	1	▲1
Australia First	4,424	0.27	+0.08	0	▼1
Liberal Democrats	4,356	0.27	−0.04	0	▼1
Our Sustainable Future	4,295	0.26	+0.18	2	
Bob Thompson	3,891	0.25	+0.13	1	Steady
Independent Labor	3,700	0.23	−0.24	4	
Community Service Environment	2,152	0.14	+0.02	0	▼1
For A Better Shoalhaven	1,394	0.10	+0.10	0	Steady
Albury Citizens and Ratepayers	301	0.03	−0.05	0	▼1
Animal Justice	193	0.02	+0.02	0	Steady
Total	1,747,912	100.00	–	–	–

== See also ==
- 2016 Tweed Shire Council election § Results.
