= Results of the 2017 New South Wales local elections =

- 9 September 2017

This is a list of local government area results for the 2017 New South Wales local elections.

== Results by LGA ==
=== LGAs by region ===
- Results of the 2017 New South Wales local elections in Central West
- Results of the 2017 New South Wales local elections in Hunter
- Results of the 2017 New South Wales local elections in Illawarra
- Results of the 2017 New South Wales local elections in Inner Sydney
- Results of the 2017 New South Wales local elections in Mid North Coast
- Results of the 2017 New South Wales local elections in Murray and Far West
- Results of the 2017 New South Wales local elections in New England
- Results of the 2017 New South Wales local elections in Northern Rivers
- Results of the 2017 New South Wales local elections in Orana
- Results of the 2017 New South Wales local elections in Outer Sydney
- Results of the 2017 New South Wales local elections in Riverina
- Results of the 2017 New South Wales local elections in South Coast and Southern Inland

== Statewide results ==
Party	Votes	%	Swing	Seats (Note: This does not include seats in 79 LGAs that were won in 2016 but not up for re-election until the 2021 local elections.)	Change
Independents	687,863	32.26		241	
Labor	535,852	25.62		105	
Liberal	533,377	25.50		96	
Greens	180,532	8.63		31	
Your Northern Beaches	40,828	1.95	+1.95	6	▲6
Our Local Community	36,250	1.73	+1.73	4	▲4
Local Independent Party	13,631	0.65		0	▼2
Good For Manly	8,045	0.65	+0.65	1	▲1
Residents First Woollahra	7,150	0.34	+0.12	5	Steady
Christian Democrats	6,770	0.32		0	Steady
Serving Mosman	5,402	0.26	+0.14	3	Steady
Liberal Democrats	4,177	0.20		1	Steady
Residents For Mosman	4,175	0.20	+0.11	2	▲1
Lorraine Wearne	4,055	0.19	–0.04	1	▼1
Shooters, Fishers and Farmers	3,821	0.18		2	
Independent Community Voice	3,575	0.17		1	▲1
Kogarah Residents	3,384	0.16	+0.16	1	▲1
Independent One Nation	3,343	0.16	+0.16	1	▲1
Independent Christian Democrats	3,298	0.16	+0.16	1	▲1
Australia First	3,279	0.16		0	Steady
Residents Action Group	3,158	0.15		0	▼2
Ben Shields Team	2,650	0.13	+0.13	1	▲1
Communist	1,595	0.07	+0.00	0	▼1
Strathfield Independents	1,467	0.07	+0.07	1	▲1
Animal Justice	804	0.04		0	Steady
Socialist Alliance	407	0.02		0	Steady
Independent Greens	236	0.01	+0.01	0	Steady
Total	2,091,126	100.00	–	–	–
Registered voters / turnout	2,730,000	76.60		–	–

== Individual council results ==
=== Blayney ===
==== Blayney results ====
2017 New South Wales local elections: Blayney
Party	Candidate	Votes	%	±%
Independent	Scott Ferguson (elected)	1,329	30.9	+19.4
Independent	Allan Ewin (elected)	605	14.1	−3.9
Independent	David Kingham (elected)	447	10.4	−0.1
Country Labor	Scott Denton (elected)	418	9.7	+9.7
Independent	John Newstead (elected)	416	9.1	
Independent	Bruce Reynolds (elected)	393	9.1	+9.1
Independent	David Somervaille (elected)	311	7.2	−0.1
Greens		272	6.3	+6.3
Independent	Nyree Reynolds	139	3.2	+3.2
Total formal votes		4,299	94.82	
Informal votes		235	5.18	
Turnout		4,784	85.73	

=== Burwood ===
==== Burwood results ====
Elected councillor	Party
Heather Crichton	Labor
Joseph Del Duca	Liberal
Lesley Furneaux-Cook	ICV
George Mannah	Labor
Ernest Chan	Labor
Raj Dixit	Liberal

2017 New South Wales local elections: Burwood
Party	Candidate	Votes	%	±%
	Labor	7,912	51.1	+7.2
	Liberal	4,002	25.8	−1.8
	Independent Community Voice	3,575	23.1	+0.0
Total formal votes		15,489	93.66	
Informal votes		1,048	6.34	
Turnout		16,537	79.97	

=== Canada Bay ===
==== Canada Bay results ====
Elected councillor	Party
Michael Megna	Liberal
Julia Little	Labor
Charles Jago	Greens
Stephanie Di Pasqua	Liberal
Andrew Ferguson	Labor
Nicholas Yap	Liberal
Marian Parnaby	Labor
Daniela Ramondino	Independent (Group C)

2017 New South Wales local elections: Canada Bay
Party	Candidate	Votes	%	±%
Liberal		16,756	38.6	−5.9
Labor		15,383	35.4	−8.1
Greens		49,11	11.3	+0.8
Independent (Group C)		3,565	8.2	+8.2
Independent (Group B)		2,697	6.2	+6.2
Independent	Max Gergis	140	0.3	+0.3
Total formal votes		43,452	93.79	
Informal votes		2,878	6.21	
Turnout		46,330	80.67	
