= Results of the 2024 New South Wales local elections in Orana =

2024 New South Wales local elections (Central West)
- 14 September 2024

This is a list of results for the 2024 New South Wales local elections in the Orana region.

Orana covers 11 local government areas (LGAs), including Dubbo, with an estimated population of 123,862 people.

== Bogan ==
2024 Bogan Shire Council election
- 14 September 2024

All 9 seats on Bogan Shire Council 5 seats needed for a majority
| | First party |
|---|---|
| | IND |
| Party | Independents |
| Last election | 9 seats |
| Seats before | 9 |
| Seats won | 9 |
| First preference vote | 100% |
Largest party before election
Independents
Subsequent largest party
Independents

=== Bogan results ===
2024 New South Wales local elections: Bogan
| Party | Candidate | Votes | % | ±% |
|---|---|---|---|---|
| Independent | Glen Neill (elected) | 523 | 35.0 | +12.1 |
| Independent | Karl Bright (elected) | 167 | 11.2 | −3.5 |
| Independent | Emily Stanton (elected) | 130 | 8.7 | +8.7 |
| Independent | Graham Jackson (elected) | 121 | 8.1 | −3.5 |
| Independent | Douglas Menzies (elected) | 114 | 7.6 | +1.0 |
| Independent | Victoria Boag (elected) | 111 | 7.4 | −3.2 |
| Independent | Sam Issa (elected) | 110 | 7.4 | +7.4 |
| Independent | Richard Bootle (elected) | 85 | 5.7 | +5.7 |
| Independent | Richard Milligan | 76 | 5.1 | −1.7 |
| Independent | Judy Elias (elected) | 58 | 3.9 | +3.9 |
| Total formal votes | | 1,495 | 96.6 | |
| Informal votes | | 53 | 3.4 | |
| Turnout | | 1,548 | 80.0 | |

== Bourke ==
2024 Bourke Shire Council election
- 14 September 2024

All 10 seats on Bourke Shire Council 6 seats needed for a majority
| | First party |
|---|---|
| | IND |
| Party | Independents |
| Last election | 10 seats |
| Seats before | 10 |
| Seats won | 10 |
| First preference vote | 100% |
Largest party before election
Independents
Subsequent largest party
Independents

=== Bourke results ===
2024 New South Wales local elections: Bourke
| Party | Candidate | Votes | % | ±% |
|---|---|---|---|---|
| Independent | Patricia Bates-Canty (elected) | 133 | 11.8 | |
| Independent | Scott McAdam (elected) | 120 | 10.7 | |
| Independent | Maxime Nina (elected) | 105 | 9.3 | |
| Independent | Sarah Barton (elected) | 98 | 8.7 | |
| Independent | Samuel Rice (elected) | 94 | 8.4 | |
| Independent | Lachlan Ford (elected) | 92 | 8.2 | |
| Independent | Sally Davis (elected) | 88 | 7.8 | |
| Independent | Francis Kerr (elected) | 87 | 7.7 | |
| Independent | Kylie Baty (elected) | 75 | 6.7 | |
| Independent | Bob Stutsel (elected) | 73 | 6.5 | |
| Independent | Nathan Ryan | 61 | 5.4 | |
| Independent | Victor Bartley | 53 | 4.7 | |
| Independent | Cecil Dorrington | 27 | 2.4 | |
| Independent | Grace Ridge | 20 | 1.8 | |
| Total formal votes | | 1,126 | 96.7 | |
| Informal votes | | 38 | 3.3 | |
| Turnout | | 1,164 | 67.2 | |

== Brewarrina ==
2024 Brewarrina Shire Council election
- 14 September 2024

All 9 seats on Brewarrina Shire Council 5 seats needed for a majority
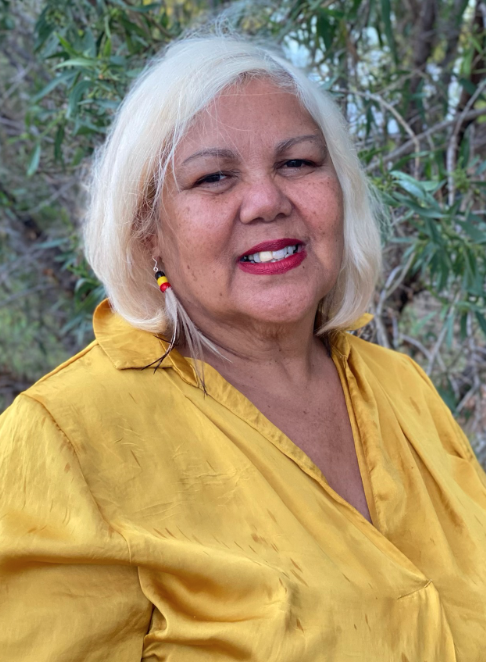
| | First party | Second party |
|---|---|---|
| | IND |
| Leader | N/A | Trish Frail |
| Party | Independents | Greens |
| Last election | 8 seats | 1 seat |
| Seats before | 8 | 1 |
Largest party before election
Independents
Subsequent largest party
TBD

=== Brewarrina results ===
2024 New South Wales local elections: Brewarrina
| Party | Candidate | Votes | % | ±% |
|---|---|---|---|---|
| Independent | Vivian Slack-Smith (elected) | 105 | 18.8 | −8.2 |
| Independent | Angelo Pippos (elected) | 79 | 14.1 | +2.5 |
| Independent | Tommy Stanton (elected) | 70 | 12.5 | −6.1 |
| Independent | Belinda Colless (elected) | 68 | 12.1 | +12.1 |
| Independent | Mark Brown (elected) | 50 | 8.9 | +3.4 |
| Independent | Douglas Gordon (elected) | 46 | 8.2 | −0.7 |
| Independent | Michael Pedersen (elected) | 39 | 7.0 | +7.0 |
| Independent | Jason Morton (elected) | 33 | 5.9 | +5.9 |
| Greens | Trish Frail (elected) | 29 | 5.2 | −1.9 |
| Independent | Isaac Gordon | 23 | 4.1 | −0.3 |
| Independent | Noel Sheridan | 18 | 3.2 | −3.5 |
| Total formal votes | | 560 | 96.1 | |
| Informal votes | | 23 | 3.9 | |
| Turnout | | 583 | 61.7 | |

== Cobar ==
2024 Cobar Shire Council election
- 14 September 2024

All 12 seats on Cobar Shire Council 7 seats needed for a majority
- Turnout: 0.00%
| | First party | Second party |
|---|---|---|
| | IND | IND |
| Party | Independents | Ind. Liberals |
| Last election | 11 seats | Did not contest |
| Seats before | 12 | 0 |
| Seats won | 11 | 1 |
| Seat change | ▼1 | ▲1 |
| First preference vote | Unopposed | Unopposed |
Largest party before election
Independents
Subsequent largest party
Independents

Cobar Shire Council is composed of 12 councillors elected proportionally to a single ward. At the 2021 election, all 11 candidates were elected unopposed, with a by-election held in February 2022 to fill the remaining seat.

The 2024 election was also uncontested, with 11 independents and one Independent Liberal elected at the close of candidate nominations.

=== Cobar results ===
2024 New South Wales local elections: Cobar
| Party | Candidate | Votes | % | ±% |
|---|---|---|---|---|
| Independent | Jarrod Marsden (elected) | unopposed | | |
| Independent | Miranda Fry (elected) | unopposed | | |
| Independent | Bob Sinclair (elected) | unopposed | | |
| Independent | Lillian Simpson (elected) | unopposed | | |
| Independent | Peter Florance (elected) | unopposed | | |
| Independent | Michael Prince (elected) | unopposed | | |
| Independent | Harley Toomey (elected) | unopposed | | |
| Independent | Michael Haines (elected) | unopposed | | |
| Independent | Kate Winders (elected) | unopposed | | |
| Independent | Chris Deighton (elected) | unopposed | | |
| Independent | Nigel Vagg (elected) | unopposed | | |
| Independent Liberal | Wayne Phillips (elected) | unopposed | | |
| Registered electors | | | | |

== Coonamble ==
2024 Coonamble Shire Council election
- 14 September 2024

All 9 seats on Coonamble Shire Council 5 seats needed for a majority
| | First party |
|---|---|
| | IND |
| Party | Independents |
| Last election | 9 seats |
| Seats before | 9 |
| Seats won | 9 |
| First preference vote | 100% |
Largest party before election
Independents
Subsequent largest party
Independents

=== Coonamble results ===
2024 New South Wales local elections: Coonamble
| Party | Candidate | Votes | % | ±% |
|---|---|---|---|---|
| Independent | Daniel Keady (elected) | 330 | 16.2 | +16.2 |
| Independent | Pip Goldsmith (elected) | 247 | 12.1 | +12.1 |
| Independent | Paul Fisher (elected) | 227 | 11.1 | +11.1 |
| Independent | Ahmad (Al) Karanouh (elected) | 205 | 10.1 | −2.6 |
| Independent | Paul Wheelhouse (elected) | 186 | 9.1 | +9.1 |
| Independent | Adam Cohen (elected) | 175 | 8.6 | +0.3 |
| Independent | Karen Churchill (elected) | 156 | 7.7 | −1.1 |
| Independent | Steve Butler (elected) | 156 | 7.7 | +7.7 |
| Independent | Margaret Garnsey (elected) | 106 | 5.2 | +5.2 |
| Independent | Steven Smith | 82 | 4.0 | −5.1 |
| Independent | Donna Norris | 44 | 2.2 | +2.2 |
| Independent | Neil Fester | 43 | 2.1 | +2.1 |
| Independent | William Landers | 41 | 2.0 | +2.0 |
| Independent | Barbara Deans | 30 | 1.5 | −4.6 |
| Independent | Melissa Skuthorp | 11 | 0.5 | +0.5 |
| Total formal votes | | 2,039 | 95.2 | |
| Informal votes | | 102 | 4.8 | |
| Turnout | | 2,141 | 75.9 | |

== Dubbo ==
2024 Dubbo Regional Council election
- 14 September 2024

All 11 seats on Dubbo Regional Council 6 seats needed for a majority

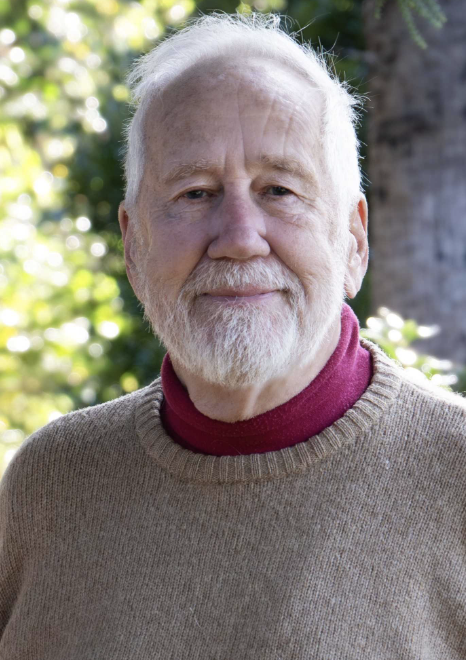
| | First party | Second party |
|---|---|---|
| | IND |
| Leader | N/A | Josh Black |
| Party | Independents | Labor |
| Last election | 5 seats | 3 seats |
| Seats before | 6 | 3 |
| | Third party | Fourth party |
| | | SFF |
| Leader | Mike Auguee | Kate Richardson |
| Party | Greens | SFF |
| Last election | Did not contest | Did not contest |
| Seats before | 0 | 0 |
Largest party before election
Independents
Subsequent largest party
TBD

Dubbo Regional Council is composed of 11 councillors elected proportionally to a single ward. Prior to this election, it was composed of five two-member wards, but a referendum held in 2021 saw 74.6% of voters vote to abolish the ward system.

The Ben Shields Team dissolved in 2022, leaving its sole councillor, Jess Gough, to sit as an independent.

The Greens and the Shooters, Fishers and Farmers Party are both endorsing candidates, having not done so in 2021.

=== Dubbo results ===
2024 New South Wales local elections: Dubbo
| Party | Candidate | Votes | % | ±% |
|---|---|---|---|---|
| Labor | 1. Josh Black (elected 1); 2. Pamella Wells (elected 4); 3. Adam Ryab (elected 10); 4. Roy Elder; 5. Jodie Benton; 6. Kirsty Hayden; 7. Greg Hough | 6,464 | 22.5 | −1 |
| Shooters, Fishers, Farmers | 1. Kate Richardson (elected 2); 2. Phillip Toynton (elected 8); 3. John Richardson; 4. Jeremy Birchall; 5. Michael Adams; 6. Sarah Hollier | 4,621 | 16.1 | |
| Independent | Mathew Dickerson (elected 3) | 3,772 | 13.2 | |
| Independent | Jennifer Cowley (elected 5) | 2,039 | 7.1 | |
| Independent | 1. Pete Rothwell; 2. Matt Rendall; 3. Manti Morse; 4. Jai Silkman; 5. Megan Adler; 6. Ricky Jackson | 1,679 | 5.9 | |
| Independent | 1. Lukas Butler (elected 11); 2. Rebecca Pearson; 3. David King; 4. Rachelle Jane; 5. Robert Osborne; 6. Angela Brooke | 1,650 | 5.8 | |
| Independent | Matt Wright (elected 6) | 1,625 | 5.7 | |
| Independent National | Shibli Chowdhury (elected 7) | 1,293 | 4.5 | |
| Greens | 1. Mike Augee; 2. Matt Parmeter; 3. Ruby Davies; 4. Pat Emblen; 5. Steve Houston; 6. Peter Duggan | 1,170 | 4.1 | |
| Independent | Richard Ivey (elected 9) | 892 | 3.1 | |
| Independent | Peter Gibbs | 758 | 2.6 | |
| Independent | 1. Kellie Jennar; 2. Sharon Quill; 3. Jude Morrell; 4. Marcello Davis; 5. Bron Powell; 6. Di Clifford | 741 | 2.6 | |
| Independent | Rod Fardell | 735 | 2.6 | |
| Independent | Jess Gough | 542 | 1.9 | |
| Independent | Sophia Johnson | 309 | 1.1 | |
| Independent | Mary Kovac | 224 | 0.8 | |
| Independent National | Trevor Jones | 172 | 0.6 | |
| Total formal votes | | 28,686 | 91.0 | |
| Informal votes | | 2,845 | 9.0 | |
| Turnout | | 31,531 | 83.2 | |

== Gilgandra ==
2024 Gilgandra Shire Council election
- 14 September 2024

All 9 seats on Gilgandra Shire Council 5 seats needed for a majority
| | First party | Second party |
|---|---|---|
| | IND | IND |
| Party | Independents | Ind. National |
| Last election | 7 seats | 2 seats |
| Seats before | 7 | 2 |
Largest party before election
Independents
Subsequent largest party
TBD

=== Gilgandra results ===
2024 New South Wales local elections: Gilgandra
| Party | Candidate | Votes | % | ±% |
|---|---|---|---|---|
| Independent National | Ashley Walker (elected 1) | 376 | 15.4 | +2.2 |
| Independent | Madeline Foran (elected 2) | 315 | 12.9 | +12.9 |
| Independent | Ian Freeth (elected 3) | 298 | 12.2 | +1.7 |
| Independent | Paul Mann (elected 4) | 288 | 11.8 | −1.7 |
| Independent | Doug Batten (elected 5) | 249 | 10.2 | −0.3 |
| Independent | Nicholas White (elected 6) | 222 | 9.1 | +2.8 |
| Independent National | Greg Peart (elected 7) | 176 | 7.2 | +0.8 |
| Independent | Gail Babbage | 174 | 7.1 | −2.4 |
| Independent | Brian Mockler (elected 9) | 173 | 7.1 | −0.4 |
| Independent | Amber Bunter (elected 8) | 163 | 6.7 | −1.0 |
| Total formal votes | | 2,434 | 95.5 | −2.0 |
| Informal votes | | 114 | 4.5 | +2.0 |
| Turnout | | 2,548 | 79.5 | −1.1 |

== Narromine ==
2024 Narromine Shire Council election
- 14 September 2024

All 9 seats on Narromine Shire Council 5 seats needed for a majority
| | First party | Second party |
|---|---|---|
| | IND | IND |
| Party | Independents | Ind. National |
| Last election | 8 seats | 1 seat |
| Seats before | 8 | 1 |
| Seats won | 7 | 2 |
| Seat change | ▼1 | ▲1 |
| First preference vote | 2,504 | 924 |
| Percentage | 74.6 | 25.4 |
| Swing | ▲74.6 | ▲25.4 |
Largest party before election
Independents
Subsequent largest party
TBD

=== Narromine results ===
2024 New South Wales local elections: Narromine
| Party | Candidate | Votes | % | ±% |
|---|---|---|---|---|
| Independent | Ewen Jones (elected 1) | 584 | 16.1 | +16.1 |
| Independent National | Craig Davies (elected 2) | 499 | 13.7 | +13.7 |
| Independent National | Brian Leak (elected 3) | 425 | 11.7 | +11.7 |
| Independent | Judy Smith (elected 4) | 421 | 11.6 | +11.6 |
| Independent | Stacey Bohm (elected 5) | 364 | 10.0 | +10.0 |
| Independent | Peter Howe (elected 6) | 328 | 9.0 | +9.0 |
| Independent | Lachlan Roberts (elected 8) | 206 | 5.7 | +5.7 |
| Independent | Les Lambert (elected 9) | 172 | 4.7 | +4.7 |
| Independent | Adine Hoey (elected 7) | 169 | 4.7 | +4.7 |
| Independent | Rowan James | 140 | 3.9 | +3.9 |
| Independent | Fiona Barbary | 99 | 2.7 | +2.7 |
| Independent | Vaughan Ellen | 93 | 2.6 | +2.6 |
| Independent | Christine Kelly | 89 | 2.5 | +2.5 |
| Independent | Diane Sharpe | 20 | 0.5 | |
| Independent | Melanie Pryde | 20 | 0.5 | |
| Total formal votes | | 3,629 | 94.6 | +94.6 |
| Informal votes | | 207 | 5.4 | +5.4 |
| Turnout | | 3,836 | 81.6 | +81.6 |

== Walgett ==
2024 Walgett Shire Council election
- 14 September 2024

All 9 seats on Walgett Shire Council 5 seats needed for a majority
| | First party |
|---|---|
| | IND |
| Party | Independents |
| Last election | 9 seats |
| Seats before | 9 |
| Seats won | 9 |
| First preference vote | 100% |
Largest party before election
Independents
Subsequent largest party
Independents

=== Walgett results ===
2024 New South Wales local elections: Walgett
| Party | Candidate | Votes | % | ±% |
|---|---|---|---|---|
| Independent | Alfred Seaton (elected) | 430 | 17.8 | +7.9 |
| Independent | Jasen Ramien (elected) | 348 | 14.4 | +5.3 |
| Independent | Pauline Kearl (elected) | 287 | 11.9 | |
| Independent | Jane Keir (elected) | 261 | 10.8 | +5.3 |
| Independent | Gregory Rummery (elected) | 241 | 10.0 | +1.6 |
| Independent | Scott Bailey (elected) | 191 | 7.9 | |
| Independent | Jo Coleman (elected) | 172 | 7.1 | +2.5 |
| Independent | Michael Cooke (elected) | 163 | 6.8 | −0.4 |
| Independent | Doreen Peters | 116 | 4.8 | |
| Independent | Daniel Walford (elected) | 81 | 3.4 | −1.8 |
| Independent | Mary Purse | 67 | 2.8 | |
| Independent | Kaylene (Katie) Hook | 31 | 1.3 | |
| Independent | Debra Rose | 23 | 1.0 | |
| Total formal votes | | 2,411 | 94.1 | |
| Informal votes | | 151 | 5.9 | |
| Turnout | | 2,562 | 67.5 | |

== Warren ==
2024 Warren Shire Council election
- 14 September 2024

All 12 seats on Warren Shire Council 7 seats needed for a majority
| | First party | Second party |
|---|---|---|
| | IND | IND |
| Party | Independents | Ind. National |
| Last election | 12 seats | Did not contest |
| Seats before | 12 | 0 |
| Seats won | 11 | 1 |
| Seat change | ▼1 | ▲1 |
| First preference vote | | 0 |
| Percentage | 100.0% | 0.0% |
| Swing | | Steady |
Largest party before election
Independents
Subsequent largest party
Independents

=== Warren results ===
2024 New South Wales local elections: Warren
| Party | Votes | % | Swing | Seats | Change |
|---|---|---|---|---|---|
| Independent | | | | 11 | ▼1 |
| Independent National | 0 | 0.0 | +0.0 | 1 | ▲1 |
| Formal votes | | | | | |
| Informal votes | | | | | |
| Total | | | | 12 | |
| Registered voters / turnout | | | | | |

=== A Ward ===
2024 New South Wales local elections: A Ward
| Party | Candidate | Votes | % | ±% |
|---|---|---|---|---|
| Independent | Pauline Serdity (elected) | unopposed | | |
| Independent | Gregory Whiteley (elected) | unopposed | | |
| Independent | Noel Kinsey (elected) | unopposed | | |
| Registered electors | | | | |

=== B Ward ===
2024 New South Wales local elections: B Ward
| Party | Candidate | Votes | % | ±% |
|---|---|---|---|---|
| Independent | Sarah Derrett (elected) | unopposed | | |
| Independent | Robert McKay (elected) | unopposed | | |
| Independent | Penelope Heuston (elected) | unopposed | | |
| Registered electors | | | | |

=== C Ward ===
2024 New South Wales local elections: C Ward
| Party | Candidate | Votes | % | ±% |
|---|---|---|---|---|
| Independent | David Cleasby (elected) | 110 | 40.0 | |
| Independent | Mark Kelly (elected) | 95 | 34.6 | |
| Independent | Joanne Van Eldonk | 26 | 9.5 | |
| Independent | Roslyn Jackson (elected) | 24 | 8.7 | |
| Independent | Gwyn Davis | 20 | 7.3 | |
| Total formal votes | | 275 | 94.8 | |
| Informal votes | | 15 | 5.2 | |
| Turnout | | 290 | 62.0 | |

=== D Ward ===
2024 New South Wales local elections: D Ward
| Party | Candidate | Votes | % | ±% |
|---|---|---|---|---|
| Independent | Dirk Mccloskey (elected) | unopposed | | |
| Independent | Andrew Brewer (elected) | unopposed | | |
| Independent National | Anthony Wass (elected) | unopposed | | |
| Registered electors | | | | |

== Warrumbungle ==
2024 Warrumbungle Shire Council election
- 14 September 2024

All 9 seats on Warrumbungle Shire Council 5 seats needed for a majority
| | First party |
|---|---|
| | IND |
| Party | Independents |
| Last election | 9 seats |
| Seats before | 9 |
| Seats won | 9 |
| Seat change | Steady |
| First preference vote | Unopposed |
Largest party before election
Independents
Subsequent largest party
Independents

Warrumbungle Shire Council is composed of nine councillors elected proportionally to a single ward. 17 candidates contested the 2021 election, with Kathryn Rindfleish receiving the highest individual first preference vote (12.9%).

The 2024 election was uncontested.

=== Warrumbungle results ===
2024 New South Wales local elections: Warrumbungle
| Party | Candidate | Votes | % | ±% |
|---|---|---|---|---|
| Independent | Zoe Holcombe (elected) | unopposed | | |
| Independent | Ray Lewis (elected) | unopposed | | |
| Independent | Debra Ball (elected) | unopposed | | |
| Independent | Kathryn Rindfleish (elected) | unopposed | | |
| Independent | Dale Hogden (elected) | unopposed | | |
| Independent | Kodi Brady (elected) | unopposed | | |
| Independent | Denis Todd (elected) | unopposed | | |
| Independent | Naomi Taylor (elected) | unopposed | | |
| Independent | Jason Newton (elected) | unopposed | | |
| Registered electors | | | | |
