= Results of the 2021 New South Wales local elections in Hunter =

This is a list of results for the 2021 New South Wales local elections in the Hunter Region.

== Cessnock ==
2021 Cessnock City Council election
- 4 December 2021

All 12 seats on Cessnock City Council (Note: Excluding the mayor, who is directly-elected.) 7 seats needed for a majority

	First party	Second party	Third party
		OLS
Leader	Jay Suvaal	Ian Olsen	John Moores
Party	Labor	Olsen Inds	Liberal
Last election	7 seats	1 seat	3 seats
Seats before	7	1	3
Seats won	5	4	3
Seat change	▼2	▲3	Steady
First preference vote	15,136	8,908	7,676
Percentage	42.5%	25.0	21.6%
Swing	▼6.2	▲18.7	▼0.9
Largest party before election
Labor
Subsequent largest party
Labor

Cessnock City Council is composed of four wards electing three councillors, each, as well as a directly-elected mayor. At the 2016 election, the Labor Party won a majority with seven councillors and the mayoralty.

Although Labor still won the largest number of seats, the party lost its majority on council. Incumbent B Ward councillor Ian Olsen's "Olsen Independents" group contested all four wards for the first time, winning one seat in each.

=== Cessnock results ===
2021 New South Wales local elections: Cessnock
Party	Votes	%	Swing	Seats	Change
Labor	15,136	42.5	−6.2	5	▼2
Olsen Independents	8,908	25.0	+18.7	4	▲3
Liberal	7,676	21.6	−0.9	3	Steady
Greens	3,509	9.9	+2.8	0	Steady
Independent	389	1.1		0	▼1
Formal votes	35,618	93.99			
Informal votes	2,274	6.01			
Total	37,892	100.00			

=== A Ward ===
2021 New South Wales local elections: A Ward
Party	Candidate	Votes	%	±%
Labor	1. Jay Suvaal; 2. James Hawkins (elected); 3. Logan Templeton	3,273	35.7	
Olsen Independents	1. Jessica Jurd (elected); 2. Julianne Foster; 3. Joshua Olsen	2,587	28.2	
Liberal	1. Paul Dunn (elected); 2. Kean Miles; 3. Robyn Strengers	1,939	21.2	
Greens	1. Llynda Nairn; 2. Elizabeth Hilton; 3. Jane Mowatt	988	10.8	
Independent	Allan Stapleford	389	4.2	
Total formal votes		9,176	92.8	
Informal votes		713	7.2	
Turnout			83.6	

=== B Ward ===
2021 New South Wales local elections: B Ward
Party	Candidate	Votes	%	±%
Labor	1. Anthony Burke (elected); 2. Jeffrey Crebert; 3. Tallen Howson	3,146	39.9	
Olsen Independents	1. Ian Olsen (elected); 2. Luke Bozic; 3. Tim Little	2,512	31.8	
Liberal	1. John Moores (elected); 2. Jacqueline LaFrance; 3. Daniel Ebert	1,630	20.7	
Greens	1. Louise Ihlein; 2. Vicki Heath; 3. James Ryan	605	7.7	
Total formal votes		7,893	94.1	
Informal votes		495	5.9	
Turnout			82.4	

=== C Ward ===
2021 New South Wales local elections: C Ward
Party	Candidate	Votes	%	±%
Labor	1. Anne-Marie Sander (elected); 2. Sophie Palmowski; 3. Kim Smith	4,180	43.8	
Liberal	1. Karen Jackson (elected); 2. Robert Peace; 3. John Fagg	2,375	24.9	
Olsen Independents	1. Daniel Watton (elected); 2. Leonie Allan; 3. Eric Olsen	2,047	21.4	
Greens	1. Georgina Thompson; 2. Penny Kelly; 3. Denis Rothwell	950	9.9	
Total formal votes		9,552	94.6	
Informal votes		547	5.4	
Turnout			83.2	

=== D Ward ===
2021 New South Wales local elections: D Ward
Party	Candidate	Votes	%	±%
Labor	1. Rosa Grine (elected); 2. Mitchell Hill (elected); 3. Gregory Tisdell	4,537	50.4	
Olsen Independents	1. Paul Paynter (elected); 2. Eliza Faustini; 3. Adam Robinson	1,762	19.6	
Liberal	1. Harold Slade; 2. Sharon Davson; 3. Ruth Slade	1,732	19.3	
Greens	1. Janet Murray; 2. Richard Clausen; 3. Averil Drummond	966	10.7	
Total formal votes		8,997	94.5	
Informal votes		519	5.5	
Turnout			84.5	

== Dungog ==
2021 New South Wales local elections: Dungog
Party	Votes	%	Swing	Seats	Change
Independent	6,135	100.0		6	Steady
Formal votes	6,135	95.33			
Informal votes	300	4.67			
Total	6,435	100.0			

=== A Ward ===
2021 New South Wales local elections: A Ward
Party	Candidate	Votes	%	±%
Independent	Michael Dowling (elected)	828	41.7	
Independent	Michael Tobin (elected)	604	30.4	
Independent	Stephen "Sparrow" Farrow	291	14.6	
Independent	John Connors	264	13.3	
Total formal votes		1,987	95.6	
Informal votes		91	4.4	
Turnout		2,078	87.4	

=== B Ward ===
2021 New South Wales local elections: B Ward
Party	Candidate	Votes	%	±%
Independent	Stephen Low (elected)	946	44.9	
Independent	Jessica Clark (elected)	754	35.8	
Independent	Alan Green	407	19.3	
Total formal votes		2,107	95.7	
Informal votes		94	4.3	
Turnout		2,201	86.7	

=== C Ward ===
2021 New South Wales local elections: C Ward
Party	Candidate	Votes	%	±%
Independent	Digby Rayward (elected)	965	47.3	
Independent	Bradley Bale (elected)	613	30.0	
Independent	Peter Millynn	463	22.7	
Total formal votes		2,041	46.7	
Informal votes		115	5.3	
Turnout		2,156	85.7	

== Lake Macquarie ==
2021 New South Wales local elections: Lake Macquarie
Party	Votes	%	Swing	Seats	Change
Labor	50,340	39.2		6	▲1
Liberal	33,078	25.7		3	Steady
Lake Mac Independents	24,922	19.4		3	Steady
Greens	12,571	9.8		0	Steady
Independent	4,661	3.6		0	Steady
Shooters, Fishers, Farmers	29,80	2.3		0	Steady
Formal votes	128,552				

=== East Ward ===
Elected councillor	Party
Adam Shultz	Labor
Nick Jones	Liberal
Kate Warner	LMI
Christine Buckley	Labor

2021 New South Wales mayoral elections: East Ward
Party	Candidate	Votes	%	±%
Labor		17,397	41.8	
Liberal		10,997	26.4	
Lake Mac Independents		6,884	16.6	
Greens		3,675	8.8	
Independent (Group A)		2,438	5.9	
Independent	Alan Ellis	202	0.5	
Total formal votes		41,593	94.7	
Informal votes		2,311	5.3	
Turnout		43,904	85.2	

=== North Ward ===
Elected councillor	Party
Brian Adamthwaite	Labor
Jack Antcliff	Liberal
Colin Grigg	LMI
Keara Conroy	Labor

2021 New South Wales mayoral elections: North Ward
Party	Candidate	Votes	%	±%
Labor		18,014	42.6	
Liberal		9,237	21.8	
Lake Mac Independents		6,485	15.3	
Greens		5,007	11.8	
Shooters, Fishers, Farmers		2,980	7.0	
Independent	Bryce Ham	593	1.4	
Total formal votes		42,316	95.2	
Informal votes		2,147	4.8	
Turnout		44,463	85.5	

=== West Ward ===
Elected councillor	Party
David Belcher	Labor
Jason Pauling	Liberal
Luke Cubis	LMI
Madeline Bishop	Labor

2021 New South Wales mayoral elections: West Ward
Party	Candidate	Votes	%	±%
Labor		14,929	33.4	
Liberal		12,844	28.8	
Lake Mac Independents		11,553	25.9	
Greens		3,889	8.7	
Independent	Rosmairi Dawson	1,428	3.2	
Total formal votes		44,643	94.4	
Informal votes		2,665	5.6	
Turnout		47,308	82.0	

- Incumbent councillor Wendy Harrison (Independent Lake Alliance) did not recontest

== Maitland ==
2021 Maitland City Council election
- 25 October 2021

All 12 seats on Maitland City Council (Note: Excluding the mayor, who is directly-elected.) 7 seats needed for a majority
- Turnout: 86.6% (▲2.4 pp)

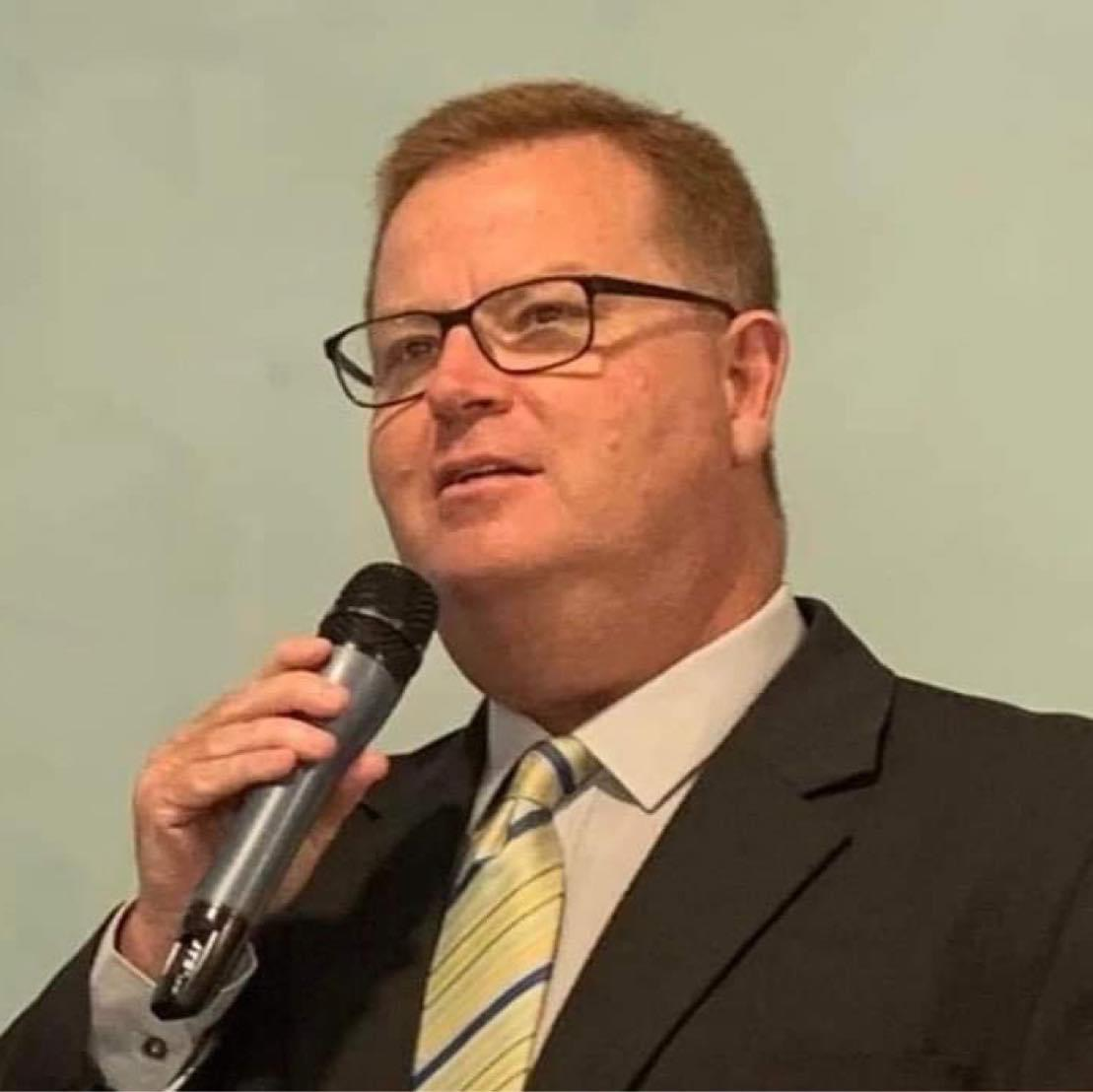

	First party	Second party	Third party
Leader	Loretta Baker	Philip Penfold	Ben Mitchell
Party	Labor	Penfold Inds	Liberal
Last election	4 seats	4 seats	4 seats
Seats won	4	4	4
Primary vote	19,983	14,963	12,329
Percentage	37.7%	28.3%	23.3%
Largest party before election
Labor
Subsequent largest party
Penfold Independents

Maitland City Council is composed of four three-member wards, totalling 12 councillors, as well as a directly-elected mayor.

=== Maitland results ===
2021 New South Wales local elections: Maitland
Party	Votes	%	Swing	Seats	Change
Labor	19,983	37.7		4	Steady
Penfold Independents	14,963	28.3		4	Steady
Liberal	12,329	23.3		4	Steady
Greens	2,785	5.3		0	Steady
Independents	2,901	5.5		0	Steady
Formal votes	52,961	94.6			
Informal votes	3,008	5.4			
Total	55,969	100.0		12	
Registered Voters / turnout	64,601	86.6			

=== Central Ward ===
2021 New South Wales local elections: Central Ward
Party	Candidate	Votes	%	±%
Labor	1. Loretta Baker (elected); 2. Blake Mooney; 3. Amelia Atkinson	5,013	38.3	+6.0
Liberal	1. Sally Halliday (elected); 2. James Peters; 3. Rod Doherty	3,341	25.5	+3.6
Penfold Independents	1. Bill Hackney (elected); 2. Kevin Yarrington; 3. Warrick Penfold	2,720	20.8	−0.3
Greens	1. John Brown; 2. Natalie Masterton; 3. Susan Brown	1,682	12.9	+4.3
Independent	Brian Burke	327	2.5	−13.6
Total formal votes		13,083	94.9	
Informal votes		696	5.1	
Turnout		13,779	85.8	

=== East Ward ===
2021 New South Wales local elections: East Ward
Party	Candidate	Votes	%	±%
Labor	1. Ben Whiting (elected); 2. Peta Lindsay; 3. Jackson Wheatland	5,360	43.2	+11.2
Penfold Independents	1. Peter Garnham (elected); 2. Allen Garnham; 3. Kathleen Barkley	3,544	28.6	−6.7
Liberal	1. Kanchan Ranadive (elected); 2. John Yoole; 3. Carol Doherty	3,148	25.4	+3.1
Independent	Paul Johns	345	2.8	+2.8
Total formal votes		12,397	94.3	
Informal votes		751	5.7	
Turnout		13,148	86.6	

=== North Ward ===
2021 New South Wales local elections: North Ward
Party	Candidate	Votes	%	±%
Labor	1. Robert Aitchison (elected); 2. Michael Voorbij; 3. Angela Harvey	4,623	31.3	−8.1
Penfold Independents	1. Philip Penfold (elected mayor); 2. Mike Yarrington (elected); 3. Leonnie Carter	4,072	27.6	−8.0
Liberal	1. Mitchell Griffin (elected); 2. Marilyn Philip; 3. Selby Green	2,734	18.5	−5.5
Greens	1. Campbell Knox; 2. Lauren Arbuckle; 3. Connor Jacobs	1,103	7.5	+7.5
Independent	1. Michael Cooper; 2. Chloe Ellenbacher; 3. Timothy Cooper	1,826	12.4	−4.6
Independent	Paul Hickey	222	1.5	+1.5
Independent	Shahriar (Sean) Saffari	181	1.2	+1.2
Total formal votes		14,761	94.7	
Informal votes		822	5.3	
Turnout		15,583	88.4	

=== West Ward ===
2021 New South Wales local elections: West Ward
Party	Candidate	Votes	%	±%
Labor	1. Stephanie Fisher (elected); 2. Mary-Kate Ferguson; 3. John Leao	4,987	39.2	−0.6
Penfold Independents	1. Kristy Ferguson (elected); 2. Geoffrey Mayer; 3. William Penfold	4,627	36.4	+9.2
Liberal	1. Ben Mitchell (elected); 2. Suhas Ranadive; 3. Valerie Yoole	3,106	24.4	+5.8
Total formal votes		12,720	94.5	
Informal votes		739	5.5	
Turnout		13,459	85.6	

== Port Stephens ==
=== Port Stephens results ===
2021 New South Wales local elections: Port Stephens
Party	Votes	%	Swing	Seats	Change
Independent	21,335	45.9	−36.7	4	
Labor	19,372	41.6	+24.2	4	▲3
Liberal	4,255	9.1	+3.6 (Note: Compared with the Independent Liberal result at the 2017 election.)	1	▲1
Greens	1,565	3.4	+3.4	0	Steady
Formal votes	46,527	93.8			
Informal votes	3,073	6.2			
Turnout	49,600	86.1			

=== Central ===
Elected councillor	Party
Jason Wells	Labor
Chris Doohan	Independent (Group B)
Steve Tucker	Independent (Group A)

2021 New South Wales local elections: Central Ward
Party	Candidate	Votes	%	±%
Independent (Group B)		4,686	28.8	
Independent (Group A)		4,226	25.9	
Labor		5,618	34.5	+19.6
Greens		1,565	9.6	+9.6
Independent	Bill Doran	194	1.2	
Total formal votes		16,289	92.7	+2.4
Informal votes		1,286	7.3	−2.4
Turnout		17,575	86.9	+1.6

=== East ===
Elected councillor	Party
Leah Anderson	Labor
Glen Dunkley	Independent
Matthew Bailey	Liberal

2021 New South Wales local elections: East Ward
Party	Candidate	Votes	%	±%
	Labor	5,850	39.5	+31.6
	Independent	4,708	31.8	
	Liberal	4,255	28.7	+12.0
Total formal votes		14,813	95.7	+2.5
Informal votes		669	4.3	−2.5
Turnout		15,482	84.8	+0.9

=== West ===
Elected councillor	Party
Arnott Giacomo	Labor
Peter Francis	Labor
Peter Kafer	Independent (Group A)

2021 New South Wales local elections: West Ward
Party	Candidate	Votes	%	±%
Labor		7,904	51.2	+22.7
Independent (Group A)		6,608	42.8	
Independent	Danielle Le Mottee	266	1.7	
Independent	Monique Malone	239	1.5	
Independent	Christopher Baguley	209	1.4	
Independent	Andrew Dole	199	1.3	
Total formal votes		15,425	93.4	+0.2
Informal votes		1,088	6.6	−0.2
Turnout		16,513	86.1	+2.2

- Incumbent councillor Paul Le Mottee (Independent Liberal) was unable to recontest due to a clerical error
