= Results of the 2021 New South Wales local elections in Central West =

This is a list of results for the 2021 New South Wales local elections in the Central West region.

== Bathurst ==
Elected councillor	Party
Ben Fry	Balanced Bathurst
Kirralee Burke	Balanced Bathurst
Ian North	TEAM NORTH
Marg Hogan	Marg Hogan Team
Graeme Hanger	Team Hanger
Jess Jennings	Better Bathurst
Robert 'Stumpy' Taylor	Back Bathurst
Andrew 'Struthy' Smith	Back Bathurst
Warren Aubin	Bathurst First

2021 New South Wales local elections: Bathurst
Party	Candidate	Votes	%	±%
Balanced Bathurst		4,943	20.0	
Back Bathurst		4,334	17.5	
TEAM NORTH		2,475	10.0	
Marg Hogan Team		2,119	8.6	
Better Bathurst		2,057	8.3	
Team Hanger – Working Together for Bathurst		1,737	7.0	
The Restore Bathurst Team		1,458	5.9	
Nick Packham for Bathurst		1,244	5.0	
Bathurst First		1,125	4.6	
Bathurst Matters		792	3.2	
Independent	Alex Christian	733	3.0	
TEAM BOURKE	Bobby Bourke	456	1.8	
Independent (Group J)		393	1.6	
Independent	Stuart Driver	292	1.2	
Team Singleton		214	0.9	
Independent	Catherine Strods	129	0.5	
Independent	Steve Semmens	105	0.4	
TEAM BOURKE	Jeff Muir	42	0.2	
TEAM BOURKE	Steve Ellery	25	0.1	
TEAM BOURKE	Ken Hope	21	0.1	
TEAM BOURKE	Michael Forde	10	0.0	
Total formal votes		24,704	92.7	
Informal votes		1,939	7.3	
Turnout			86.3	

== Blayney ==
2021 New South Wales local elections: Blayney
Party	Candidate	Votes	%	±%
Independent	Scott Ferguson (elected)	1,036	22.7	
Independent	Bruce Reynolds (elected)	635	13.9	
Independent	Michelle Pryse Jones (elected)	605	13.3	
Independent	Craig Gosewisch (elected)	559	12.3	
Independent	Allan Ewin (elected)	526	11.5	
Independent	David Somervaille (elected)	443	9.7	
Independent	John Newstead (elected)	416	9.1	
Independent	Iris Dorsett	340	7.5	
Total formal votes		4,560	95.3	
Informal votes		224	4.7	
Turnout		4,784	87.7	

== Cabonne ==
2021 New South Wales local elections: Cabonne
Party	Candidate	Votes	%	±%
Independent	Kevin Beatty (elected)	1,859	23.7	
Independent	Marlene Nash (elected)	1,090	13.9	
Independent	Andrew Pull (elected)	726	9.3	
Independent	Kathryn O'Ryan (elected)	657	8.4	
Independent	Andrew Rawson (elected)	641	8.2	
Independent	Jamie Jones (elected)	638	8.1	
Independent	Peter Batten (elected)	511	6.5	
Independent	Libby Oldham (elected)	378	4.8	
Independent	Aaron Pearson	375	4.8	
Independent	Kevin Walker	293	3.7	
Independent	Jenny Weaver (elected)	250	3.2	
Independent	Paul Mullins	205	2.6	
Total formal votes		7,836	92.7	
Informal votes		618	7.3	
Turnout		8,454	84.0	

== Cowra ==
2021 New South Wales local elections: Cowra
Party	Candidate	Votes	%	±%
Independent	Bill West (elected)	2,132	27.5	
Independent	Erin Watt (elected)	1,138	14.7	
Independent	Sharon D'Elboux (elected)	705	9.1	
Independent	Nikki Kiss (elected)	676	8.7	
Independent	Cheryl Downing (elected)	527	6.8	
Independent	Peter Wright (elected)	428	5.5	
Independent	Paul Smith (elected)	386	5.0	
Independent National	Ruth Fagan (elected)	265	3.4	
Independent	Donna Peters	260	3.3	
Independent National	Ian Docker	235	3.0	
Independent	Rodrick Buhr	230	3.0	
Independent	Judi Smith (elected)	216	2.8	
Independent	Michael Nobes	152	2.0	
Independent	Alex Cozadinos	145	1.9	
Independent	Rebecca Morgan	143	1.8	
Independent	Simon Bray	126	1.6	
Total formal votes		7,764	94.2	
Informal votes		480	5.8	
Turnout		8,244	85.0	

== Forbes ==
2021 New South Wales local elections: Forbes
Party	Candidate	Votes	%	±%
Independent National	Phyllis Miller (elected)	2,062	36.6	
Independent	Steve Karaitiana (elected)	577	10.3	
Independent	Jenny Webb (elected)	569	10.1	
Independent	Margaret Duggan (elected)	456	8.1	
Independent	Aidan Clarke (elected)	451	8.0	
Independent	Maria Willis (elected)	272	4.8	
Independent	Chris Roylance (elected)	267	4.7	
Independent	Emma Henderson	190	3.4	
Independent	Brian Mattiske (elected)	176	3.1	
Independent	Graeme Miller	164	2.9	
Independent	Thomas Dwyer	160	2.8	
Independent	Michele Herbert (elected)	142	2.5	
Independent	Jeff Nicholson	142	2.5	
Total formal votes		5,628	97.1	
Informal votes		170	2.9	
Turnout		5,798	83.1	

== Lachlan ==
2021 New South Wales local elections: Lachlan
Party	Votes	%	Swing	Seats	Change
Independent	649	100.0	+0.0	10	Steady
Formal votes	649	98.2			
Informal votes	12	1.8			
Total	661	100.0			
Registered voters / turnout	4,366	15.14			

=== A Ward ===
2021 New South Wales local elections: A Ward
Party	Candidate	Votes	%	±%
Independent	John Medcalf (elected)	unopposed		
Independent	Megan Mortimer (elected)	unopposed		
Registered electors		859		

=== B Ward ===
2021 New South Wales local elections: B Ward
Party	Candidate	Votes	%	±%
Independent	Melissa Blewitt (elected)	unopposed		
Independent	Melissa Rees (elected)	unopposed		
Registered electors		846		

=== C Ward ===
2021 New South Wales local elections: C Ward
Party	Candidate	Votes	%	±%
Independent	Dave Carter (elected)	unopposed		
Independent	Peter Harris (elected)	unopposed		
Registered electors		839		

=== D Ward ===
2021 New South Wales local elections: D Ward
Party	Candidate	Votes	%	±%
Independent	Elaine Bendall (elected)	unopposed		
Independent	Dennis Brady (elected)	unopposed		
Registered electors		906		

=== E Ward ===
2021 New South Wales local elections: E Ward
Party	Candidate	Votes	%	±%
Independent	Judith Bartholomew (elected)	281	43.3	
Independent	Paul Phillips (elected)	239	36.8	
Independent	Allan Johnston	73	11.2	
Independent	Mark Hall	56	8.6	
Total formal votes		649	98.2	
Informal votes		12	1.8	
Turnout		661	72.2	

== Lithgow ==
Elected councillor	Party
Maree Stratham	Team Maree
Col O'Connor	Team Maree
Stuart McGhie	Team Maree
Almudena Bryce	Team Maree
Darryl Goodwin	Good for Council
Deanna Goodsell	Good for Council
Cass Coleman	Cass Coleman
Eric Mahony	Cass Coleman
Stephen Lesslie	Independent

2021 New South Wales local elections: Lithgow
Party	Candidate	Votes	%	±%
	Team Maree	5,502	42.1	
	Good for Council	2,496	19.1	
	Cass Coleman Community Team	2,147	16.4	
	Independent	1,665	12.7	
	Ring's Independent Lithgow	633	4.8	
	Lithgow First	618	4.7	
Total formal votes		13,061	95.4	
Informal votes		636	4.6	
Turnout		13,697	86.4	

== Oberon ==
2021 New South Wales local elections: Oberon
Party	Candidate	Votes	%	±%
Independent	Mark Kellam (elected)	570	17.7	
Independent	Clive McCarthy (elected)	435	13.5	
Independent	Ian Tucker (elected)	352	10.9	
Independent	Katy Graham (elected)	301	9.4	
Independent	Mick McKechnie (elected)	252	7.8	
Independent	Andrew McKibbin (elected)	249	7.7	
Independent	Lauren Trembath (elected)	220	6.8	
Independent	Bruce Watt (elected)	213	6.6	
Independent	Helen Hayden (elected)	155	4.8	
Independent	Sig Sovik	143	4.4	
Independent	Neil Francis	121	3.8	
Independent	Gregory Bourne	113	3.5	
Independent	Margaret Kilby	91	2.8	
Total formal votes		3,215	95.5	
Informal votes		153	4.5	
Turnout		3,368	84.4	

== Orange ==
Elected councillor	Party
Tony Mileto	For Our Future
Jack Evans	For Our Future
Tammy Greenhalgh	Team Hamling
Glenn Floyd	SFF
Steven Peterson	Refresh Orange
Kevin Duffy	Independent (Group F)
David Mallard	Greens
Melanie McDonell	McDonell Team
Jeff Whitton	Ind. Labor
Frances Kinghorne	ORRAP
Gerald Power	Independent (Group I)

2021 New South Wales local elections: Orange
Party	Candidate	Votes	%	±%
For Our Future		3,786	15.9	
Team Hamling		3,155	13.3	
Shooters, Fishers, Farmers		2,928	12.3	
Refresh Orange		2,469	10.4	
Independent (Group F)		2,351	9.9	
Greens		2,185	9.2	
McDonell Team		1,870	7.9	
Independent Labor		1,786	7.5	
Orange Residents and Ratepayers Association		1,408	5.9	
Independent (Group I)		846	3.6	
Independent	Amanda Spalding	347	1.5	
Independent	Geoff Naughton	266	1.1	
Independent	Lesley Smith	192	0.8	
Independent	Scott Munro	105	0.4	
Independent	Josh Girle-Bennett	46	0.2	
Total formal votes		23,740	93.4	
Informal votes		1,684	6.6	
Turnout		25,424	84.4	

== Parkes ==
2021 New South Wales local elections: Parkes
Party	Candidate	Votes	%	±%
Independent	1. Glenn Wilson (elected); 2. Erik Snyman; 3. Matthew Scherer; 4. Daniel Weber (elected); 5. Peter Weber; 6. Ray Hodge	1,596	19.9	
Independent National	Ken Keith (elected)	1,172	14.6	
Independent	Louise O'Leary (elected)	786	9.8	
Independent	Neil Westcott (elected)	708	8.8	
Independent	Bill Jayet (elected)	707	8.8	
Independent	Jacob Cass (elected)	650	8.1	
Independent	Marg Applebee (elected)	573	7.1	
Independent	Kenny McGrath (elected)	496	6.2	
Independent	George Pratt (elected)	431	5.4	
Independent National	John Southon	332	4.1	
Independent	Johanne Burke	213	2.7	
Independent	Cathy Francis	160	2.0	
Independent	John Coulston	156	1.9	
Independent	Sean White	47	0.6	
Total formal votes		8,027	91.0	
Informal votes		797	9.0	
Turnout		8,824	83.8	
Party total votes
Independent		6,523	81.3	
Independent National		1,504	18.7	
Party total seats			Seats	±
Independent			9	
Independent			1	
