= Results of the 2021 New South Wales local elections in South Coast and Southern Inland =

This is a list of results for the 2021 New South Wales local elections in the South Coast and Southern Inland region.

== Bega Valley ==
2021 Bega Valley Shire Council election
- 4 December 2021

All 9 seats on Bega Valley Shire Council 5 seats needed for a majority

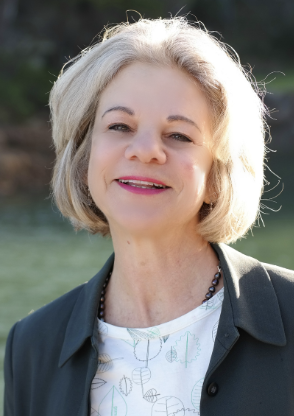
	First party	Second party	Third party
	IND
Leader	N/A	Helen O'Neil	Cathy Griff
Party	Independents	Labor	Greens
Seats won	7	1	1
First preference vote	15,064	4,943	2,665
Percentage	70.3%	17.3%	12.4%
Largest party before election
Independents
Subsequent largest party
Independents

Bega Valley Shire Council is composed of nine councillors elected proportionally to a single ward.

=== Bega Valley results ===
2021 New South Wales local elections: Bega Valley
Party	Candidate	Votes	%	±%
Labor	1. Helen O'Neil (elected); 2. Simon Daly	4,943	17.3	
Independent	Russell Fitzpatrick (elected)	2,818	13.1	
Greens	1. Cathy Griff (elected); 2. Vivian Harris; 3. Paula Park; 4. Angus Ashcroft; 5. Peter Haggar	2,665	12.4	
Independent	Tony Allen (elected)	2,594	12.1	
Independent	Karen Wright (elected)	2,539	11.8	
Independent	Mitch Nadin (elected)	1,201	5.6	
Independent	Joy Robin (elected)	1,080	5.0	
Independent	David Porter (elected)	1,003	4.7	
Independent	Mike Britten	884	4.1	
Independent	Liz Seckhold (elected)	875	4.1	
Independent	Nathan O'Donnell	852	4.0	
Independent	Joshua Shoobridge	650	3.0	
Independent	Neil Bourke	568	2.6	
Total formal votes		21,435	91.4	
Informal votes		2,026	8.6	
Turnout		23,461	87.9	

== Eurobodalla ==
Elected councillor	Party
Rob Pollock	Prefer Pollock
Noel (Tubby) Harrison	A Better Council
Anthony Mayne	The Mayne Team
Amber Schutz	Advance Eurobodalla
David Grace	Labor
Alison Worthington	Greens
Peter Diskon	Prefer Pollock
Tanya Dannock	Advance Eurobodalla

2021 New South Wales local elections: Eurobodalla
Party	Candidate	Votes	%	±%
	Advance Eurobodalla	5,012	20.1	
	Prefer Pollock	4,644	18.7	
	The Mayne Team	4,196	16.9	
	Labor	3,752	15.1	
	A Better Council	3,486	14.0	
	Greens	2,684	10.8	
	Independent (Group G)	1,101	4.4	
Total formal votes		24,875	93.3	
Informal votes		1,780	6.7	
Turnout		26,655	83.3	

== Goulburn Mulwaree ==
2021 Goulburn Mulwaree Council election
- 4 December 2021

All 9 seats on Goulburn Mulwaree Council 5 seats needed for a majority

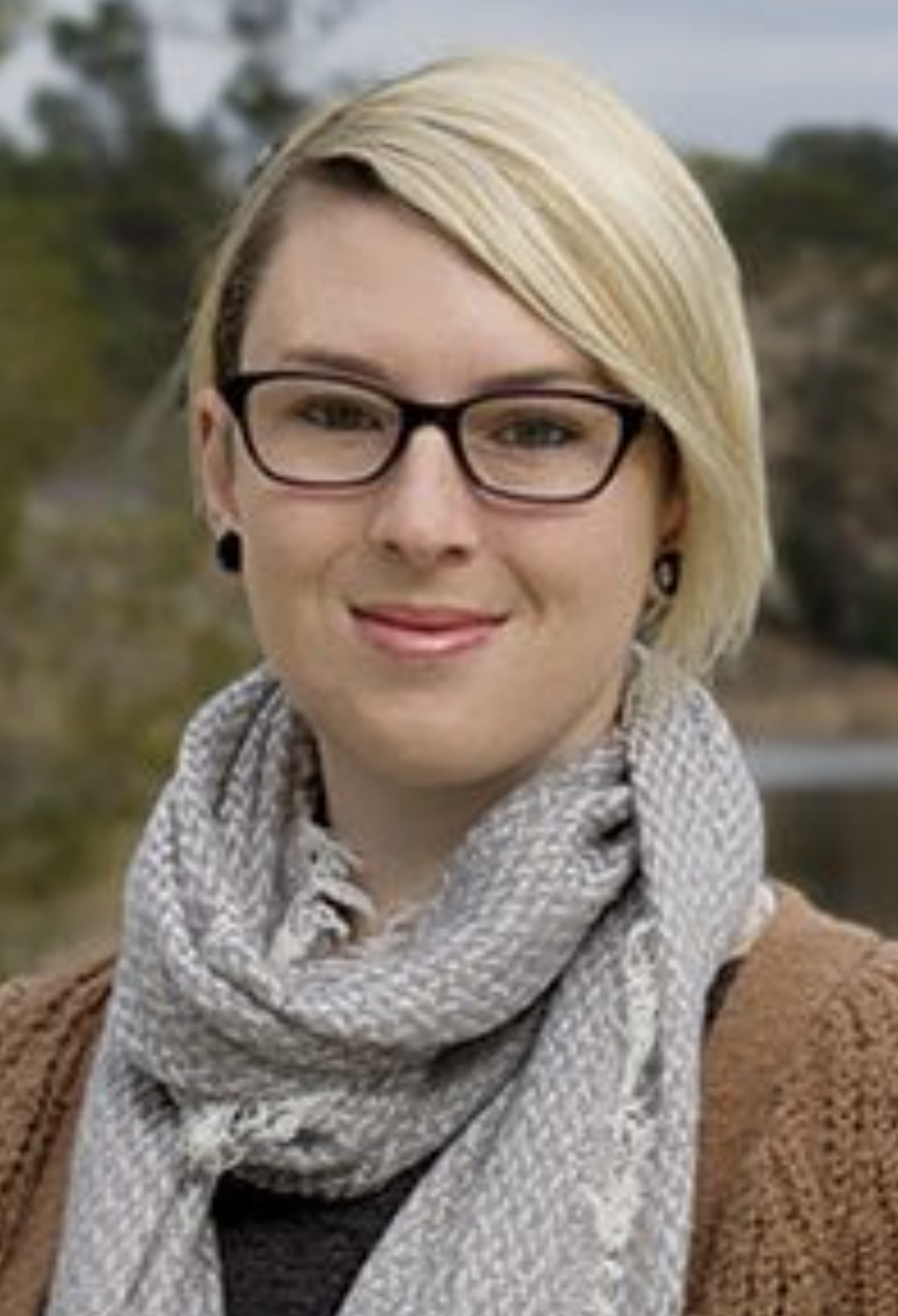
	First party	Second party
	IND
Leader	N/A	Jason Shephard
Party	Independents	Labor
Seats won	7	1
Seat change	▼1	▲1
First preference vote	12,293	3,017
Percentage	70.7%	17.3%
	Third party	Fourth party
	SFF
Leader	Andy Wood	Leah Ferrara
Party	SFF	Greens
Seats won	1	1
Seat change	▲1	▼1
First preference vote	1,268	816
Percentage	7.3%	4.7%
Largest party before election
Independents
Subsequent largest party
TBD

Goulburn Mulwaree Council is composed of nine councillors elected proportionally to a single ward.

=== Goulburn Mulwaree results ===
2021 New South Wales local elections: Goulburn Mulwaree
Party	Candidate	Votes	%	±%
Independent	Bob Kirk (elected)	4,000	23.0	
Labor	1. Jason Shephard (elected); 2. Anna Wurth-Crawford; 3. Danielle Marsden-Ballard; 4. Warren Murray; 5. Nathan Smith	3,017	17.3	
Independent	Michael Prevedello (elected)	1,554	8.9	
Independent	Daniel Strickland (elected)	1,425	8.2	
Shooters, Fishers, Farmers	Andy Wood (elected)	1,268	7.3	
Independent	James Carol (elected)	1,056	6.1	
Independent	Peter Walker (elected)	1,030	5.9	
Independent	Steven Ruddell (elected)	1,003	5.8	
Independent	Andrew Banfield (elected)	878	5.0	
Greens	Leah Ferrara	816	4.7	
Independent	Margaret O'Neill	774	4.4	
Independent	Timothy Dally	382	2.2	
Independent	Adam Milani	191	1.1	
Total formal votes		17,394	92.0	
Informal votes		1,519	8.0	
Turnout		18,913	87.8	

== Hilltops ==
2021 Hilltops Council election
- 4 December 2021

All 11 seats on Hilltops Council 6 seats needed for a majority
	First party
	IND
Party	Independents
Seats won	11
First preference vote	11,021
Percentage	100.0%
Largest party before election
Independents
Subsequent largest party
Independents

Hilltops Council is composed of 11 councillors elected proportionally to a single ward.

Councillor Matthew Stadtmiller, a member of the Shooters, Fishers and Farmers Party since shortly before the 2017 election, left the party prior to the 2021 election.

=== Hilltops results ===
2021 New South Wales local elections: Hilltops
Party	Candidate	Votes	%	±%
Independent	Alison Foreman (elected)	1,769	16.1	
Independent	Margaret Roles (elected)	1,450	13.2	
Independent	Matthew Stadtmiller (elected)	1,436	13.0	
Independent	Brian Ingram (elected)	999	9.1	
Independent	John Piper (elected)	952	8.6	
Independent	Joanne Mackay (elected)	869	7.9	
Independent	Tony Flanery (elected)	798	7.2	
Independent	Mary Dodd (elected)	567	5.1	
Independent	Tony Hewson (elected)	482	4.4	
Independent	Greg Armstrong (elected)	462	4.2	
Independent	Patrick Fitzgerald (elected)	452	4.1	
Independent	John Horton	413	3.7	
Independent	John Niven	372	3.4	
Total formal votes		11,021	93.3	
Informal votes		788	6.7	
Turnout		11,809	82.5	

== Queanbeyan–Palerang ==
2021 Goulburn Mulwaree Council election
- 4 December 2021

All 9 seats on Goulburn Mulwaree Council 5 seats needed for a majority

	First party	Second party	Third party
		ANC
Leader	Jason Shephard
Party	Labor	A New Chapter	Liberal
Seats won	3	2	2
First preference vote	7,398	5,847	5,829
Percentage	21.9%	17.3%	17.2%
	Fourth party	Fifth party	Sixth party
	IND		TB
Leader	N/A		Michele Biscotti
Party	Independents	Greens	Team Biscotti
Seats won	2	1	1
First preference vote	12,304	3,389	2,205
Percentage	27.1%	10.0%	6.5%
Largest party before election
Independents
Subsequent largest party
TBD

Elected councillor	Party
Bryce Wilson	Labor
Esma Livermore	Labor
John Preston	Labor
Kenrick Winchester	A New Chapter
Edwina Webster	A New Chapter
Louise Burton	Liberal
Jacqueline Ternouth	Liberal
Katrina Willis	Greens
Mareeta Grundy	Independent (Group B)
Steve Taskovski	Independent (Group D)
Michele Biscotti	Team Biscotti

2021 New South Wales local elections: Queanbeyan–Palerang
Party	Candidate	Votes	%	±%
Labor		7,398	21.9	+8.2
A New Chapter		5,847	17.3	
Liberal		5,829	17.2	+8.0
Greens		3,389	10.0	+3.5
Independent (Group B)		3,168	9.4	
Independent (Group D)		2,518	7.4	
Team Biscotti		2,205	6.5	
Independent	Bill Waterhouse	1,181	3.5	
Independent (Group H)		1,021	3.0	
Independent (Group C)		1,004	3.0	
Independent	Ginevra Peisley	93	0.3	
Independent (Group E)		87	0.3	
Independent	James Holgate	43	0.1	
Independent	Kyol Booth-Hunt	31	0.1	
Total formal votes		33,813	95.3	+1.1
Informal votes		1,684	4.7	−1.1
Turnout		35,497	86.1	+7.8
