= Results of the 2016 New South Wales local elections in Mid North Coast =

2016 New South Wales local elections in the Mid North Coast
- 10 September 2016

This is a list of results of the 2016 New South Wales local elections in the Mid North Coast region.

== Coffs Harbour ==
2016 Coffs Harbour City Council election
- 10 September 2016

All 9 seats on Coffs Harbour City Council
- Registered: 54,174
- Mayor
- Turnout: 80.4%
| | First party | Second party | Third party |
|---|---|---|---|
| | IND | 4OC | IND |
| Candidate | Denise Knight | Jan Strom | Keith Rhoades |
| Party | Unaligned | 4 OUR Community | Independent |
| Primary vote | 11,758 | 6,975 | 6,766 |
| Percentage | 28.3% | 16.8% | 16.3% |
| Swing | ▲8.3 | ▲16.8 | ▼3.6 |
| TCP | 59.0% | 49.7% |
| TCP swing | ▲6.8 | ▲49.7 |
Mayor before election
Denise Knight
Unaligned
Elected Mayor
Denise Knight
Unaligned
- Councillors
- All 8 Councillors (out of 9 seats) on Coffs Harbour City Council
- Turnout: 80.6%
| Party | Vote % | Seats | +/– |
|---|---|---|---|
| Independents | 85.8 | 7 | |
| Greens | 12.2 | 1 | |
This lists parties that won seats. See the complete results below.

The NSW Greens and Country Labor both ran official tickets. The Liberals who ran a ticket in 2012 did not run again, and Cr. John Arkan who ran as a Liberal candidate last election recontested as an independent.

Group G, branded and stylised as Smart Coffs Harbour and led by Mike Squire, ran on a platform of making Coffs Harbour a smarter city.

Group I, which was led by Jan Strom, ran under a ticket named and branded as Jan Strom 4 OUR Community.

=== Coffs Harbour results ===
2016 New South Wales local elections: Coffs Harbour City Council
| Party | Candidate | Votes | % | ±% |
|---|---|---|---|---|
| Independents (Group A) | 1. ~~Denise Knight~~ (elected mayor); 2. Tegan Swan (elected 1); 3. Michael Adendorff (elected 7); 4. Christina Monneron; 5. Troy Robinson; 6. Eliezer Robinson; 7. Julie Ross; 8. Jill Nash | 10,393 | 26.1 | |
| Independents (Group F) | 1. Keith Rhoades (elected 2); 2. George Cecato (elected 8); 3. Ray Smith; 4. Martin Wells | 5,937 | 14.9 | |
| Independents (Group D) | 1. John Arkan (elected 3); 2. Annette Mavin; 3. Peter Ainsworth; 4. Matthew McLeod; 5. Kelly McNeil; 6. Tracey Adams | 5,165 | 13.0 | |
| Greens (Group C) | 1. Sally Townley (elected 4); 2. Craig Christie; 3. Johnathan Cassell; 4. Mark Graham | 4,863 | 12.2 | |
| Jan Strom 4 OUR Community (Group I) | 1. Jan Strom (elected 5); 2. Pat Brown; 3. Jenny Oloman; 4. Julie Ferguson | 4,771 | 12.0 | |
| Independent | Paul Amos (elected 6) | 4,293 | 10.8 | |
| Smart Coffs Harbour (Group G) | 1. Mike Squire; 2. Alec McHarg; 3. David Rushworth; 4. Sparky Somosi | 1,364 | 3.4 | |
| Independents (Group B) | 1. Mark Sultana; 2. Susan Clarke; 3. Jeffrey Portelli | 1,049 | 2.6 | |
| Country Labor (Group E) | 1. David Quinn; 2. Damian Wood; 3. Kerrie Burnet | 784 | 2.0 | |
| Independent | Jon Snow | 508 | 1.3 | |
| Independent | Erhard Demehlt | 137 | 0.3 | |
| Total formal votes | | 39,809 | 91.2 | |
| Informal votes | | 3,853 | 8.8 | |
| Turnout | | 43,662 | 80.6 | |

=== Coffs Harbour mayoral results ===
2016 New South Wales local elections: Coffs Harbour Mayor
| Party | Candidate | Votes | % | ±% |
|---|---|---|---|---|
| Independent | Denise Knight | 11,758 | 28.3 | +8.3 |
| 4 OUR Community | Jan Strom | 6,975 | 16.8 | |
| Independent | Keith Rhoades | 6,766 | 16.3 | −3.6 |
| Independent | John Arkan | 6,203 | 14.9 | −4.9 |
| Greens | Sally Townley | 4,928 | 11.8 | +3.1 |
| Independent | Mark Sultana | 2,793 | 6.7 | |
| Smart Coffs Harbour | Mike Squire | 1,132 | 2.7 | |
| Independent | Carol Harrison | 683 | 1.6 | |
| Independent | David Marchant | 376 | 0.9 | |
| Total formal votes | | 41,614 | 95.6 | |
| Informal votes | | 1,926 | 4.4 | |
| Turnout | | 43,540 | 80.4 | |
Two-candidate-preferred result
| Independent | Denise Knight | 15,042 | 59.0 | +6.8 |
| 4 OUR Community | Jan Strom | 10,456 | 49.7 | |
| Denise Knight hold | | Swing | +6.8 | |
