= Results of the 2017 New South Wales local elections in Central West =

Results of the 2017 New South Wales local elections
- 9 September 2017

These are the results of the 2017 New South Wales local elections in the Central West region.

== Bathurst ==
2017 Bathurst Regional Council election
- 9 September 2017

All 9 seats on Bathurst Regional Council 5 seats needed for a majority
	First party	Second party	Third party
	IND	IND
Party	Independents	Independent SFF	The Greens NSW
Seats won	7	1	1
Primary vote	18,527	2,190	1,617
Percentage	79.7%	9.4%	7.0%
Largest party before election
Independents
Largest party following election
Independents

=== Bathurst results ===
Elected councillor	Party
Bobby Bourke	TEAM BOURKE
Jacqui Rudge	TEAM BOURKE
Ian North	TEAM NORTH
Warren Aubin	Bathurst First
Alex Christian	Ind. SFF
Graeme Hanger	Independent (Group G)
Jess Jennings	Independent (Group C)
John Fry	Greens
Monica Morse	Independent (Group B)

2017 New South Wales local elections: Bathurst
Party	Candidate	Votes	%	±%
TEAM BOURKE		4,745	20.4	
Independent (Group G)		4,634	19.9	
Bathurst First		2,571	11.1	
Independent SFF	Alex Christian	2,190	9.4	
TEAM NORTH		2,093	9.0	
Independent (Group C)		2,118	9.1	
Independent (Group B)		1,945	8.4	
Greens		1,617	7.0	
Independent Labor	Nick Packham	926	4.0	
Independent (Group F)		421	1.8	
Total formal votes		23,260	93.55	
Informal votes		1,605	6.45	
Turnout		24,865	84.86	

== Cabonne ==
2017 Cabonne Council election
- 9 September 2017

All 12 seats on Cabonne Council
	First party
	IND
Party	Independents
Seats won	12
Primary vote	7,555
Percentage	100%
Largest party before election
Independents
Largest party following election
Independents

=== Cabonne results ===
2017 New South Wales local elections: Cabonne
Party	Candidate	Votes	%	±%
Independent	Kevin Beatty (elected)	919	12.2	
Independent	Peter Batten (elected)	867	11.5	
Independent	Kevin Walker (elected)	842	11.1	
Independent	Greg Treavors (elected)	705	9.3	
Independent	Marlene Nash (elected)	629	8.3	
Independent	Cheryl Newsom (elected)	624	8.1	
Independent	Jamie Jones (elected)	592	7.8	
Independent	Ian Davison (elected)	545	7.2	
Independent	Libby Oldham (elected)	411	5.4	
Independent	Anthony Durkin (elected)	396	5.2	
Independent	Jenny Waver (elected)	324	4.3	
Independent	Paul Mullins (elected)	301	4.0	
Independent	Duncan Brakell	226	3.0	
Independent	Derek Johnson	184	2.4	
Total formal votes		7,555	89.88	
Informal votes		851	10.12	
Turnout		8,406	84.80	
