= Results of the 2017 New South Wales local elections in New England =

Results of the 2017 New South Wales local elections
- 9 September 2017

This is a list of results of the 2017 New South Wales local elections in the New England region.

== Armidale ==
2017 Armidale Regional Council election
- 9 September 2017

All 11 seats on Armidale Regional Council 6 seats needed for a majority
- Registered: 1,913
- Turnout: %

	First party	Second party
	IND
Party	Independents	Country Labor
Seats won	8	1
Primary vote	10,032	1,706
Percentage	64.9%	11.0%
	Third party	Fourth party
Party	Ind. Liberal Ticket	The Greens
Seats won	1	1
Primary vote	1,588	1,163
Percentage	10.3%	7.5%
Largest party before election
Independents
Largest party following election
Independents

The Liberal Party did not endorse any candidates, including its councillor elected to Armidale Dumaresq Shire in 2012.

The New England Futures group contested the election as Group A.

=== Armidale results ===
Elected councillor	Party
Ian Tiley	Independent
Debra O'Brien	Country Labor
Margaret O'Connor	Ind. Liberal
Dorothy Robinson	Greens
Simon Murray	Independent
Jon Galletly	Independent
Libby Martin	Independent
Diane Gray	Independent
Andrew Murat	Independent
Bradley Widders	Independent
Paul Gaddes	Independent

2017 New South Wales local elections: Armidale
Party	Candidate	Votes	%	±%
Independent	Ian Tiley	1,726	11.2	
Country Labor (Group D)	1. Debra O'Brien; 2. Susan McMichael; 3. Liam Dudgeon; 4. Yvonne Langenberg; 5. Jasmin Hughes; 6. Margaret Finley	1,706	11.0	+11.0
Independent Liberal (Group B)	1. Margaret O'Connor; 2. Mavis Ahoy; 3. Tony Sorensen; 4. Suresh Simson; 5. Amber Fernandez; 6. Alex Cunningham; 7. David Buck	1,588	10.3	
Independent	Simon Murray	1,502	9.7	
Independent	Jon Galletly	1,405	9.1	
Greens (Group C)	1. Dorothy Robinson; 2. Peter O'Donohue; 3. Tim Collins; 4. Pat Schultz; 5. Johanna Garnet; 6. Dora Koops	1,163	7.5	−5.7
New England Futures Group (Group A)	1. David Levingstone; 2. Inga Brasche; 3. Laurence Nussbaumer; 4. Heidi Evans	675	4.4	+4.4
Independent	Libby Martin	665	4.3	
Independent	Diane Gray	481	3.1	
Independent	Bradley Widders	476	3.1	
Independent	Jim Maher	445	2.9	
Independent	Andrew Murat	432	2.8	
Independent	Peter Bailey	415	2.7	
Independent	Kevin Dupe	368	2.4	
Independent Liberal	Aileen MacDonald	296	1.9	
Independent	Maria Hitchcock	241	1.6	
Independent	Michelle Wheatley	234	1.5	
Independent	Les Davis	205	1.3	
Independent	Gordon Cope	202	1.3	
Independent	Joshua Fittler	179	1.2	
Independent	Jack Hobbs	167	1.1	
Independent	Herman Beyersdorf	161	1.0	
Independent	Colin Gadd	158	1.0	
Independent	Jack Rapely	137	0.9	
Independent	Martha Saw	108	0.7	
Independent	Trev Smith	102	0.7	
Independent	Tom Walsh	99	0.6	
Independent	Aziz Winrow	65	0.4	
Independent	Dale Curtis	59	0.4	
Total formal votes		15,460	94.09	
Informal votes		971	5.91	
Turnout		16,431	80.64	
Party total votes
Independent		10,032	64.9	
Independent Liberal		1,884	12.2	
Labor		1,706	11.0	+11.0
Greens		1,163	7.5	−5.7
New England Futures Group		675	4.4	+4.4
