= 2016 Tweed Shire Council election =

- 29 October 2016
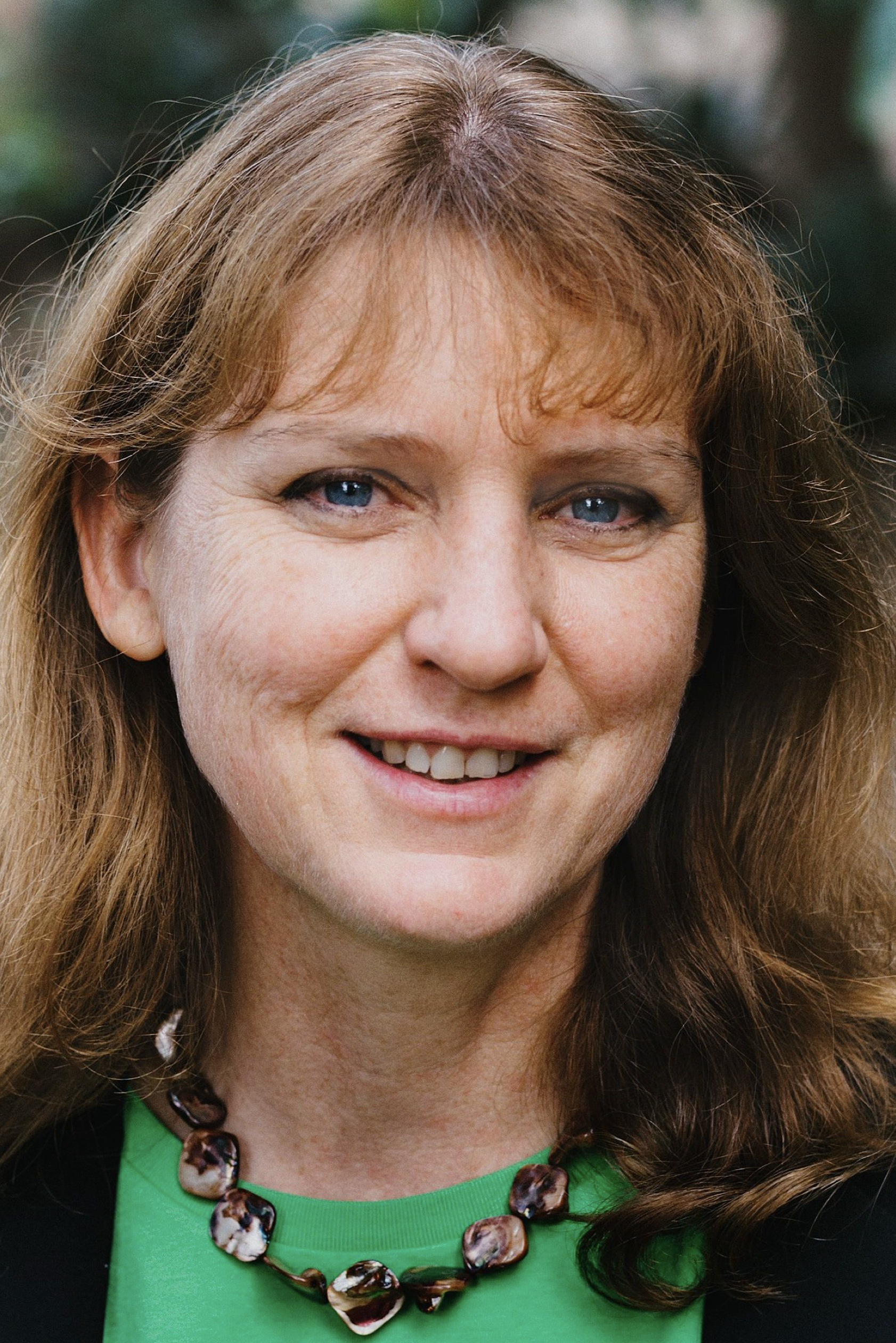

| | First party | Second party | Third party |
|---|---|---|---|
| | IND |
| Leader | N/A | Katie Milne | James Owen |
| Party | Independents | Greens | Liberal |
| Seats won | 3 | 1 | 1 |
| Popular vote | 24,802 | 7,279 | 5,525 |
| Percentage | 52.22% | 15.30% | 11.63% |
| | Fourth party | Fifth party | Sixth party |
| | | NHR | DHG |
| Leader | Reece Byrnes | Ron Cooper | Dot Holdom |
| Party | Country Labor | No High-Rise | Dot Holdom Group |
| Seats won | 1 | 1 | 0 |
| Popular vote | 4,970 | 2,028 | 1,524 |
| Percentage | 10.46% | 4.27% | 3.21% |

The 2016 Tweed Shire Council election was held on 29 October 2016 to elect seven councillors to the Tweed Shire, a local government area of New South Wales, Australia.

The election was scheduled to be held a month earlier on 10 September 2016 as part of the statewide local elections, however it was postponed following the death of No High-Rise candidate Ken "Stents" Nicholson, aged 88. Nicholson died on 19 August 2016, after suffering a heart attack and fall.

76 candidates in 15 groups (as well as four ungrouped candidates) contested the election.

== Timeline ==
- 19 August: Ken Nicholson dies in hospital
- 20 August: Election scheduled for 10 September postponed
- 31 August: New election date of 29 October announced
- 19 September: Candidate nominations open
- 28 September: Candidate nominations close
- 29 October: Election held

== Results ==
| Elected councillor | Party |
|---|---|
| Katie Milne | Greens |
| Warren Polglase | Independent (Group A) |
| Pryce Allsop | Independent (Group H) |
| James Owen | Liberal |
| Reece Byrnes | Country Labor |
| Chris Cherry | Independent (Group B) |
| Ron Cooper | No High-Rise |

2016 Tweed Shire Council election
| Party | Candidate | Votes | % | ±% |
|---|---|---|---|---|
| Independent (Group A) | | 7,336 | 15.45 | |
| Greens | | 7,279 | 15.33 | |
| Liberal | | 5,525 | 11.63 | |
| Independent (Group H) | | 5,053 | 10.64 | |
| Country Labor | | 4,970 | 10.46 | |
| Independent (Group B) | | 2,821 | 5.94 | |
| No High-Rise | | 2,028 | 4.27 | |
| Independent (Group I) | | 1,956 | 4.21 | |
| Independent (Group K) | | 1,690 | 3.56 | |
| Independent (Group C) | | 1,551 | 3.27 | |
| Dot Holdom Group | | 1,524 | 3.21 | |
| Carolyn Byrne Group | | 1,369 | 2.88 | |
| Independent (Group E) | | 1,364 | 2.87 | |
| Independent (Group O) | | 1,159 | 2.44 | |
| Independent (Group J) | | 1,158 | 2.44 | |
| Independent | Dion Andrews | 466 | 0.98 | |
| Independent | Suzy Hudson | 106 | 0.22 | |
| Independent | Mathuranath Das | 73 | 0.15 | |
| Independent | James McKenzie | 69 | 0.15 | |
| Total formal votes | | 47,497 | 93.17 | |
| Informal votes | | 3,482 | 6.83 | |
| Turnout | | 50,979 | | |
