= Results of the 2021 New South Wales local elections in Orana =

This is a list of results for the 2021 New South Wales local elections in the Orana region.

== Bogan ==
2021 New South Wales local elections: Bogan
Party	Candidate	Votes	%	±%
Independent	Glen Neill (elected)	336	22.9	
Independent	Karl Bright (elected)	216	14.7	
Independent	Graham Jackson (elected)	200	13.6	
Independent	Victoria Boag (elected)	155	10.6	
Independent	Jodi Douglas (elected)	116	7.9	
Independent	Richard Milligan (elected)	99	6.7	
Independent	Douglas Menzies (elected)	97	6.6	
Independent	Michael Hoare	66	4.5	
Independent	Greg Deacon (elected)	65	4.4	
Independent	Veneta Dutton	59	4.0	
Independent	Tony Elias (elected)	58	4.0	
Total formal votes		1,467	97.5	
Informal votes		38	2.5	
Turnout		1,505	78.4	

== Bourke ==
2021 New South Wales local elections: Bourke
Party	Candidate	Votes	%	±%
Independent	Victor Bartley (elected)	unopposed		
Independent	Sarah Barton (elected)	unopposed		
Independent	Sally Davis (elected)	unopposed		
Independent	Cec Dorrington (elected)	unopposed		
Independent	Lachlan Ford (elected)	unopposed		
Independent	Barry Hollman (elected)	unopposed		
Independent	Samuel Rice (elected)	unopposed		
Independent	Grace Ridge (elected)	unopposed		
Independent	Nathan Ryan (elected)	unopposed		
Independent	Bob Stutsel (elected)	unopposed		
Registered electors		1,775		

== Brewarrina ==
2021 New South Wales local elections: Brewarrina
Party	Candidate	Votes	%	±%
Independent	Vivian Slack-Smith (elected)	148	26.9	
Independent	Thomas Stanton (elected)	102	18.5	
Independent	Angelo Pippos (elected)	64	11.6	
Independent	Gordon Douglas (elected)	49	8.9	
Greens	Trish Frail (elected)	39	7.1	
Independent	Noel Sheridan (elected)	37	6.7	
Independent	Mark Brown (elected)	36	6.5	
Independent	Donna Jefferies (elected)	28	5.1	
Independent	Lily Shearer	24	4.4	
Independent	Isaac Gordon (elected)	23	4.2	
Total formal votes		550	97.0	
Informal votes		17	3.0	
Turnout		567	63.6	
Party total votes
Independent		511	92.9	
Greens		39	7.1	
Party total seats			Seats	±
Independent			8	▼1
Greens			1	▲1

== Cobar ==
2021 New South Wales local elections: Cobar
Party	Candidate	Votes	%	±%
Independent	Peter Abbott (elected)	unopposed		
Independent	Tony Chaplain (elected)	unopposed		
Independent	Janine Lea-Barrett (elected)	unopposed		
Independent	Jarrod Marsden (elected)	unopposed		
Independent	Peter Maxwell (elected)	unopposed		
Independent	Kain Neale (elected)	unopposed		
Independent	Julie Payne (elected)	unopposed		
Independent	Lillian Simpson (elected)	unopposed		
Independent	Bob Sinclair (elected)	unopposed		
Independent	Harley Toomey (elected)	unopposed		
Independent	Kate Winders (elected)	unopposed		
Registered electors		2,829		

=== 2022 Cobar Shire Council by-election ===
2022 Cobar Shire Council by-election: 26 February 2022
Party	Candidate	Votes	%	±%
Independent	Michael Prince (elected)	1,537	77.28	+77.28
Independent	Jesse Cochrane Adolfson	452	22.72	+22.72
Total formal votes		1,989	98.42	
Informal votes		32	1.58	
Turnout		2,021	80.0	
Independent hold		Swing		

- By-election held to fill the remaining 12th seat, which was not filled at the 2021 election

== Coonamble ==
2021 New South Wales local elections: Coonamble
Party	Candidate	Votes	%	±%
Independent	Tim Horan (elected)	346	16.5	
Independent	Ahmad (Al) Karanouh (elected)	267	12.7	
Independent	Karen Churchill (elected)	184	8.8	
Independent	Adam Cohen (elected)	174	8.3	
Independent	Bill Fisher (elected)	173	8.3	
Independent	Brian Sommerville (elected)	166	7.9	
Independent	Barbara Deans (elected)	127	6.1	
Independent	Pat Cullen (elected)	107	5.1	
Independent	Steven 'Jay' Smith	107	5.1	
Independent	Robert Thomas	100	4.8	
Independent	Terry Lees (elected)	97	4.6	
Independent	Chris Newbold	73	3.5	
Independent	Narelle Mayoh	56	2.7	
Independent	Tracy Mood	46	2.2	
Independent	Robert Ryan	41	2.0	
Independent	Luke Day	18	0.9	
Independent	Karen McCusker	14	0.7	
Total formal votes		2,096	97.6	
Informal votes		51	2.4	
Turnout		2,147	78.6	

== Dubbo ==
2021 New South Wales local elections: Dubbo
Party	Votes	%	Swing	Seats	Change
Independent	12,711	43.5		5	
Labor	6,871	23.5		3	
Ben Shields Team	5,687	19.4		1	Steady
Independent National	3,973	13.6		1	
Formal votes	29,242				

=== Dubbo Central ===
2021 New South Wales local elections: Dubbo Central Ward
Party	Candidate	Votes	%	±%
Independent	Mathew Dickerson (elected)	2,999	56.4	
Labor	1. Vicki Etheridge (elected); 2. Joe Knagge	1,457	27.4	
Ben Shields Team	1. Ben Shields; 2. Nathan Ellis	864	16.2	
Total formal votes		5,320	95.8	
Informal votes		232	4.2	
Turnout		5,552	80.9	

=== Dubbo East ===
2021 New South Wales local elections: Dubbo East Ward
Party	Candidate	Votes	%	±%
Independent	1. Lewis Burns (elected); 2. Adele (Della) Burns	1,498	28.6	
Ben Shields Team	1. Jeremy Ellis; 2. Trina Thornbury	1,231	23.5	
Independent	Damien Mahon (elected)	1,041	19.9	
Labor	Tatum Moore	601	11.8	
Independent	Rod Fardell	648	12.4	
Independent	Ana Pateman	212	4.1	
Total formal votes		5,231	94.7	
Informal votes		294	5.3	
Turnout			80.9	

=== Dubbo North ===
2021 New South Wales local elections: Dubbo North Ward
Party	Candidate	Votes	%	±%
Independent	Matthew Wright (elected)	1,674	26.6	
Labor	1. Pamela Wells (elected); 2. Peter Allen	1,377	21.9	
Ben Shields Team	1. Mick Catelotti; 2. Ann Barnard	1,101	17.5	
Independent	1. Grahame Miller; 2. Karina McLachlain	930	14.8	
Independent	Matthew Smith	432	6.9	
Independent National	Greg Matthews	777	12.4	
Total formal votes		6,291	94.9	
Informal votes		337	5.1	
Turnout			80.8	

=== Dubbo South ===
2021 New South Wales local elections: Dubbo South Ward
Party	Candidate	Votes	%	±%
Labor	1. Josh Black (elected); 2. Greg Hough	2,320	33.7	
Independent National	Shibli Chowdhury (elected)	1,911	27.8	
Ben Shields Team	1. Greg Mohr; 2. Merrilyn Mulcahy	1,360	19.8	
Independent National	Kevin Parker	1,285	18.7	
Total formal votes		6,876	95.5	
Informal votes		324	4.5	
Turnout			85.8	

=== Wellington ===
2021 New South Wales local elections: Wellington Ward
Party	Candidate	Votes	%	±%
Independent	Richard Ivey (elected)	1,275	23.1	
Ben Shields Team	1. Jess Gough (elected); 2. Mikaela Solomons	1,131	20.5	
Labor	1. Helen Swan; 2. Christopher Bailey	1,116	20.2	
Independent	Anne Jones	1,013	18.3	
Independent	Lizzy George	989	17.9	
Total formal votes		5,524	96.3	
Informal votes		212	3.7	
Turnout		5,736	83.7	

== Gilgandra ==
2021 New South Wales local elections: Gilgandra
Party	Candidate	Votes	%	±%
Independent	Paul Mann (elected)	337	13.5	
Independent National	Ashley Walker (elected)	328	13.2	
Independent	Ian Freeth (elected)	263	10.6	
Independent	Doug Batten (elected)	262	10.5	
Independent	Gail Babbage (elected)	238	9.6	
Independent	Noel Mudford (elected)	206	8.3	
Independent	Amber Bunter (elected)	193	7.7	
Independent	Brian Mockler (elected)	188	7.5	
Independent National	Greg Peart (elected)	160	6.4	
Independent	Helen Naef	160	6.4	
Independent	Nicholas White	157	6.3	
Total formal votes		2,492	97.6	
Informal votes		60	2.4	
Turnout		2,552	80.6	
