= 2016 New South Wales local elections =

- 10 September 2016 (Note: The election in Tweed was held on 29 October 2016.)

79 of the 128 local government areas in New South Wales

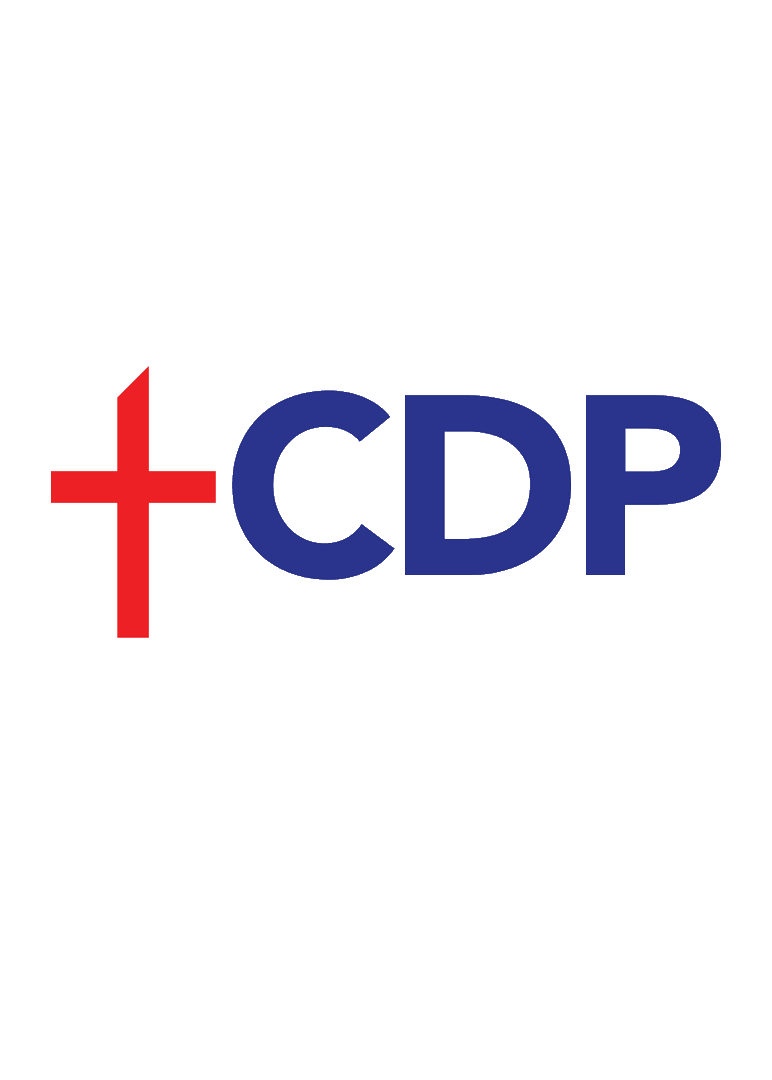

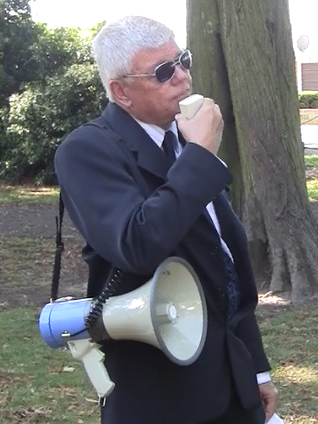

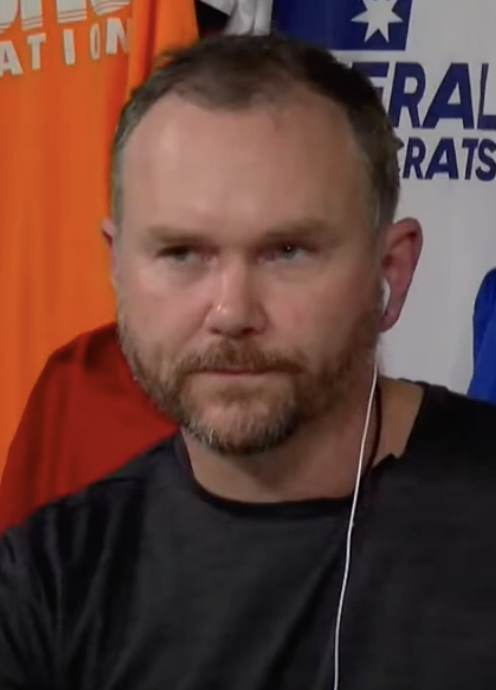
	First party	Second party	Third party
	IND
Leader	N/A	N/A	N/A
Party	Independents	Labor	Liberal
Last election	(Note: This does not include seats in 46 LGAs that were won in 2012 but not up for re-election until the 2017 local elections.)
Seats won	545	81	48
Popular vote	678,591	429,605	286,013
Percentage	39.59%	24.60%	16.40%
Swing	▲1.45	▲5.43	▼5.45
	Fourth party	Fifth party	Sixth party
Leader	No leader	Fred Nile	Jim Saleam
Party	Greens	Christian Democrats	Australia First
Last election		0	1
Seats before		1	0
Seats won	24	0	0
Seat change		▼1	Steady
Popular vote	110,491	15,326	4,424
Percentage	6.35%	0.90%	0.27%
Swing	▼0.33	▲0.49	▲0.08
	Seventh party	Eighth party
		AJP
Leader	John Humphreys	No leader
Party	Liberal Democrats	Animal Justice
Last election	1	Did not contest
Seats before	1	0
Seats won	0	0
Seat change	▼1	Steady
Popular vote	4,356	193
Percentage	0.27%	0.02%
Swing	▼0.04	▲0.02

The 2016 New South Wales local elections were held on 10 September 2016 to elect the councils of 79 of the 128 local government areas (LGAs) of New South Wales. Several councils also held mayoral elections and/or referendums.

The elections were conducted by the New South Wales Electoral Commission, with the exception of Fairfield, Gunnedah, Kempsey, Lake Macquarie and Penrith, who chose to conduct their own elections.

The election in Tweed was deferred until 29 October 2016 due to the death of a candidate.

== Background ==
Following the 2012 elections, major changes occurred as a result of the enactment of the Local Government (Areas) Act 1948 and as a result of a review by the NSW Independent Pricing and Regulatory Tribunal (IPART) that commenced in 2013. On 12 May 2016, following a further review by the Minister for Local Government and the independent Local Government Boundaries Commission, Premier Mike Baird announced Stage 1 starting with 19 new councils, through amalgamations and mergers, with immediate effect. The Minister indicated in principle support to create a further nine new councils, subject to the decision of the courts. On the same day, the Governor of New South Wales acted on the advice of the Minister, and proclaimed the 19 new local government areas. Another proclamation occurred a few months later with the amalgamation of City of Botany Bay and City of Rockdale.

This resulted in 46 councils not being contested until 2017, before the vast majority contested together again in 2021.

== Parties ==
The following registered parties contested this election. This does not include groups of independents:

- Animal Justice Party
- Christian Democrats
- Greens
- Labor Party
- Liberal Democrats
- Liberal Party

In addition, a number of local government-registered parties also contested the elections.

== Party changes before elections ==
A number of councillors joined or left parties before the 2016 elections.

In Fairfield, Labor councillor George Barcha was handed a 6-month suspension for branch stacking and ran fourth on the party's Cabravale Ward ticket at the election.

Council	Ward	Councillor	Former party	New party	Date
Cessnock	C Ward	Suellen Wrightson	Liberal	Palmer United	23 June 2013
Penrith	East	Maurice Girotto	Australia First	Independent	31 October 2013
Hurstville	Peakhurst	Michelle Stevens	Labor	Independent	3 April 2014
Ballina	B Ward	Jeff Johnson	Greens	Independent	16 February 2015
Wagga Wagga	Unsubdivided	Paul Funnell	Democratic Labour	Country	5 March 2015
Wagga Wagga	Unsubdivided	Paul Funnell	Country	Independent	29 March 2015
Fairfield	Cabravale	George Barcha	Labor	Independent Labor	11 November 2015
Blacktown	Ward 5	Jacqueline Donaldson	Liberal	Independent	2015
Penrith	East	Maurice Girotto	Independent	Christian Democrats	16 March 2016
Fairfield	Cabravale	Dai Le	Liberal	Independent	16 August 2016
Fairfield	Mayor	Frank Carbone	Labor	Independent	30 August 2016

== Results ==
Party	Votes	%	Swing	Seats (Note: Excluding directly-elected mayors.)	Change
Independents	678,591	39.59	+1.45	545	
Labor	429,605	24.60	+5.43	81	
Liberal	286,013	16.40	−5.45	48	
Greens	110,491	6.35	−0.33	23	
Clover Moore Independent Team	45,224	2.60	+1.71	5	▲1
Independent National	40,896	2.35	+1.36	15	
Shoalhaven Independents	21,510	1.31	+0.98	5	▲2
Independent Liberal	21,364	1.30	−2.57	5	
Independent Lake Alliance	20,978	1.21	+0.44	1	▼3
Lake Mac Independents	19,036	1.10	+1.10	3	▲3
Christian Democrats	15,326	0.90	+0.49	0	Steady
Liverpool Community Independents Team	13,207	0.75	+0.54	2	▲1
Totally Locally Committed	7,865	0.45	+0.24	2	Steady
Community First	7,049	0.41	+0.25	1	Steady
Sydney Matters	6,051	0.35	+0.35	1	▲1
Australia First	4,424	0.27	+0.08	0	▼1
Liberal Democrats	4,356	0.27	−0.04	0	▼1
Our Sustainable Future	4,295	0.26	+0.18	2	
Bob Thompson	3,891	0.25	+0.13	1	Steady
Independent Labor	3,700	0.23	−0.24	4	
Community Service Environment	2,152	0.14	+0.02	0	▼1
For A Better Shoalhaven	1,394	0.10	+0.10	0	Steady
Albury Citizens and Ratepayers	301	0.03	−0.05	0	▼1
Animal Justice	193	0.02	+0.02	0	Steady
Total	1,747,912	100.00	–	–	–

== Referendums ==
In addition to the local elections, six LGAs held referendums.

LGA	Question	YES		NO		Informal		Turnout		Ref
LGA	Question	Votes	%	Votes	%	Votes	%	Total	%	Ref
Hawkesbury	"Currently Hawkesbury City Council is an undivided council with no wards. Do you agree to the Hawkesbury Local Government Area being divided into three (3) wards, each ward electing four (4) Councillors?"	11,233	30.87	25,154	69.13	2,214	5.74	38,601	80.84	
Narrandera	"Do you support a reduction in the number of Councillors for the Narrandera Shire Council from nine (9) to seven (7)?"	1,636	48.92	1,708	51.08	147	4.21	3,491	80.27	
Tenterfield	"Do you favour the removal of the current ward based system so that all electors vote for all 10 Councillors that represent the Tenterfield Shire Council area?"	1,628	43.42	2,121	56.58	108	2.80	3,857	77.89	
Tweed	"Do you support an increase in the number of Tweed Shire Councillors from sever (7) to nine (9)? If there is majority support for the proposal, the changes will take effect from the 2020 Local Government election."	16,890	34.46	32,125	65.54	1,680	3.31	50,695	75.70	
Upper Hunter	"The Mayor of the Upper Hunter Shire Council is currently elected annually by the nine (9) Councillors. Do you want to change to the direct election of the Mayor by the voters of the Upper Hunter Shire Council, for a four (4) year term, with the number of Councillors (including the Mayor) remaining at nine (9)?"	3,309	43.03	4,381	56.97	170	2.16	7,860	77.87	
Wollondilly	"Do you favour the election of the Mayor by electors for a four (4) year term with the number of Wards reduced from three (3) to two (2), each Ward comprising of four (4) Councillors, plus a popularly elected Mayor?"	14,961	65.80	7,777	34.20	2,414	9.60	25,152	71.75	

== By-elections ==
The New South Wales Electoral Commission held a number of by-elections to fill vacancies on councils after the 2016 elections up until 2021.

Council	Ward	Before		Change		Result after preference distribution			
Council	Ward	Councillor	Party	Cause	Date	Date	Party	Candidate	%
Campbelltown	Unsubdivided	Fred Borg	Totally Locally Committed	Death	20 December 2016	18 March 2017	Labor	Ben Gilholme	56.47
Campbelltown	Unsubdivided	Fred Borg	Totally Locally Committed	Death	20 December 2016	18 March 2017	Community First	Josh Cotter	43.53
Lithgow	Unsubdivided					8 April 2017	Independent	Darryl Goodwin (Note: Two vacancies on council, meaning two candidates were elected - this shows their primary vote before preference distribution.)	39.83
Lithgow	Unsubdivided					8 April 2017	Independent	Deanna Goodsell	21.04
Port Macquarie-Hastings	Unsubdivided					29 July 2017	Independent	Peta Pinson	51.07
Port Macquarie-Hastings	Unsubdivided					29 July 2017	Independent	Robert Turner	48.93
Brewarrina	Unsubdivided					19 August 2017	Independent	Michael Hertslet	N/A
Brewarrina	Unsubdivided					19 August 2017	Elected unopposed		
Narromine	Unsubdivided					19 August 2017	Independent	Trudy Everingham	56.52
Narromine	Unsubdivided					19 August 2017	Independent	Ruth Carney	43.48
Tenterfield	Ward D					19 August 2017	Independent	Bob Rogan	54.43
Tenterfield	Ward D					19 August 2017	Independent	Brian Brown	45.57
Wollondilly	Unsubdivided					28 October 2017	Independent	Matt Smith	56.62
Wollondilly	Unsubdivided					28 October 2017	Independent	Laura Egan-Burt	43.38
Coonamble	Unsubdivided					26 March 2018	Independent	Robert Thomas	54.61
Coonamble	Unsubdivided					26 March 2018	Independent	Pat Cullen	45.39
Berrigan	Unsubdivided					14 July 2018	Independent	Roger Reynoldson	68.39
Berrigan	Unsubdivided					14 July 2018	Independent	Ruth Silvester	31.61
Greater Hume	East					24 November 2018	Independent	Lea Parker	52.34
Greater Hume	East					24 November 2018	Independent	Greg Mason (Note: Second-placed out of three candidate after initial preference distribution.)	24.67
Cobar	Unsubdivided					8 December 2018	Independent	Kate Winders	51.53
Cobar	Unsubdivided					8 December 2018	Independent	Benny Hewlett	48.47
Griffith	Ward A					16 February 2019	Ind. National	Glen Andreazza	55.25
Griffith	Ward A					16 February 2019	Independent	Damien Marcus	44.75
Lachlan	Ward D					16 February 2019	Independent	Elaine Bendall	63.52
Lachlan	Ward D					16 February 2019	Independent	Dennis Brady	16.01
Uralla	Ward A					16 February 2019	Independent	Tom O'Connor	66.91
Uralla	Ward A					16 February 2019	Independent	Charlotte Field-Sampson	33.09
Coonamble	Unsubdivided					29 June 2019	Independent	Pat Cullen	33.11
Coonamble	Unsubdivided					29 June 2019	Independent	Barbara Deans	24.64

== See also ==
- 2016 Sydney City Council election
- 2016 Tweed Shire Council election
