= 2021 New South Wales local elections =

- 4 December 2021

121 of the 128 local government areas in New South Wales
- Registered: 4,838,137
- Turnout: 83.05% (▲6.45pp)

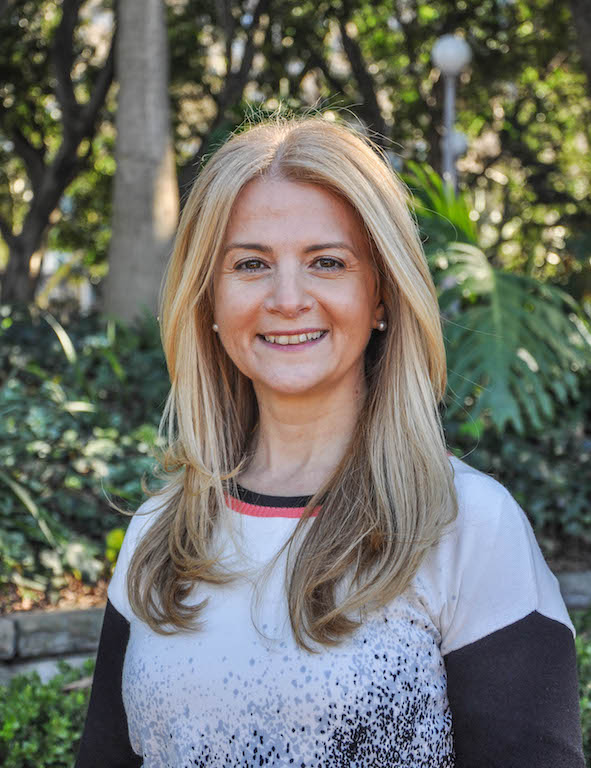

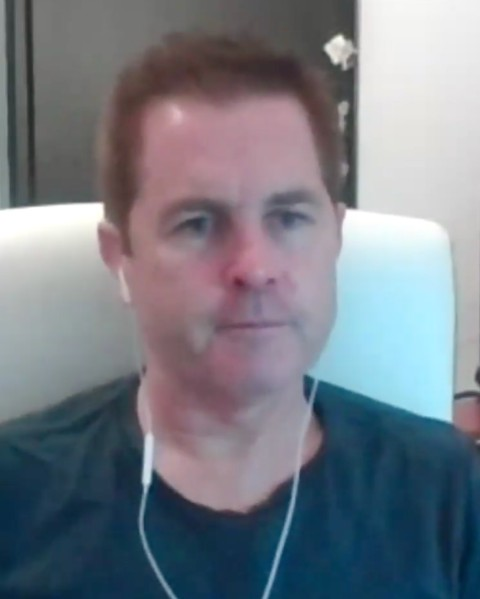
	First party	Second party	Third party
	IND
Leader	N/A	N/A	N/A
Party	Independents	Labor	Liberal
Seats won	776	188	127
Seat change	▼86	▲3	▼13
Primary vote	1,392,142	1,071,688	703,796
Percentage	33.73%	26.67%	17.52%
Swing	▼2.05	▲1.05	▼7.99
	Fourth party	Fifth party	Sixth party
		OLC
Leader	No leader	Paul Garrard	Angela Vithoulkas
Party	Greens	OLC	Small Business
Last election		4	Did not exist
Seats before		5	2
Seats won	65	10	1
Seat change	▲11	▲5	▼1
Primary vote	355,196	72,942	12,244
Percentage	8.84%	1.81%	0.30%
Swing	▲1.26	▲0.08	▲0.30
	Seventh party	Eighth party	Ninth party
	SFF	AJP
Leader	Robert Borsak	No leader	William Bourke
Party	SFF	Animal Justice	Sustainable
Last election	2	0	Did not contest
Seats before	2	0	0
Seats won	5	1	2
Seat change	▲3	▲1	▲2
Primary vote	12,053	9,724	7,308
Percentage	0.30%	0.24%	0.18%
Swing	▲0.20	▲0.20	▲0.18
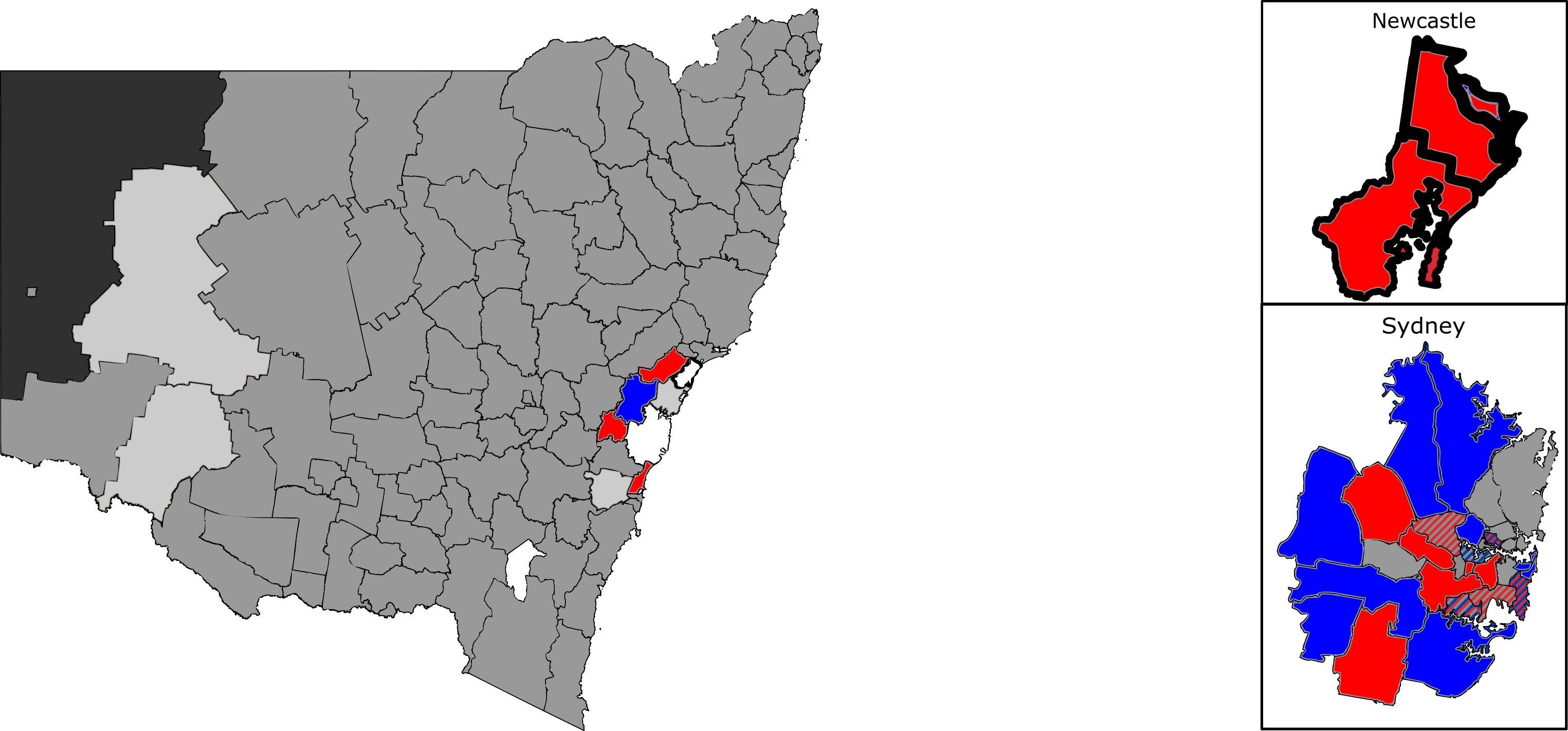
- Largest party in each LGA

The 2021 New South Wales local elections were held on 4 December 2021 to elect the councils of 121 of the 128 local government areas (LGAs) in New South Wales. Several councils also held mayoral elections and/or referendums.

The Liberal Party did not run in Kiama, North Sydney or Shoalhaven, however a number of party members chose to contest as independents.

== Background ==
Following the 2012 elections, a large amount of councils were amalgamated and the local government areas comprised larger areas. This resulted in 79 councils being contested in 2016 and 46 2017. 2021 marked the first time in nine years that the vast majority of councils were being contested at the same time.

The elections were scheduled to be held in September 2020, but as a result of the COVID-19 pandemic in Australia they were delayed until 4 September 2021. On 24 July 2021, it was announced the elections would again be delayed until 4 December 2021.

Two councils − Fairfield and Penrith − opted to use the services of the Australian Election Company, while all other elections were conducted by the NSW Electoral Commission.

The election for Norfolk Island Regional Council, which was meant to be held at the same time as New South Wales, was also postponed in 2020. It was later scheduled to be held in March 2021, however the council was suspended in February 2021 and eventually dismissed on 6 December 2021.

Lead Greens candidate for Orange, Melanie McDonell, announced on 21 May 2021 she would leave the Greens and stand on a "McDonell Team" independent ticket.

== Political parties ==
The following registered parties contested the elections. This does not include unregistered groups of independents:

- Animal Justice Party
- Greens
- Labor Party
- Liberal Democrats
- Liberal Party
- Shooters, Fishers and Farmers Party
- Socialist Alliance
- Sustainable Australia Party
- The Small Business Party

In addition, a number of local government-registered parties also contested the elections.

== Party changes before elections ==
A number of councillors joined or left parties before the 2021 elections.

Council	Ward	Councillor	Former party	New party	Date
Sydney	Unsubdivided	Kerryn Phelps	Clover Moore Independent Team	Independent	26 June 2017
Coolamon	Unsubdivided	Jeremy Crocker	Independent	Shooters, Fishers, Farmers	2 October 2017
Cumberland	Greystanes	Greg Cumming	Labor	Independent Labor	October 2017
Penrith	North	Marcus Cornish	Independent	One Nation	6 December 2017
Sydney	Unsubdivided	Kerryn Phelps	Independent	Kerryn Phelps Independents	15 September 2018
Upper Hunter	Unsubdivided	Lee Watts	Independent	Shooters, Fishers, Farmers	7 October 2018
Cumberland	Greystanes	Greg Cumming	Independent Labor	Independent	26 September 2018
Penrith	North	Marcus Cornish	One Nation	Independent	Late 2018
Strathfield	Unsubdivided	Nella Hall	Christian Democrats	Independent	Early 2019
Ryde	Central	Edwina Clifton	Greens	Labor	28 February 2019
Upper Hunter	Unsubdivided	Lee Watts	Shooters, Fishers, Farmers	Independent	Post-March 2019
Ku-ring-gai	Gordon	Peter Kelly	One Nation	Conservative National	25 April 2019
Fairfield	Cabravale	Dai Le	Independent	Dai Le	29 April 2019
Northern Beaches	Pittwater	Alex McTaggart	Community Alliance	Independent	22 July 2019
Cumberland	Granville	Steve Christou	Labor	Our Local Community	27 September 2019
Strathfield	Unsubdivided	Nella Hall	Independent	Nella Hall Independents	April 2020
Ku-ring-gai	Gordon	Peter Kelly	Conservative National	Independent	23 September 2020
Blue Mountains	Ward 2	Chris Van der Kley	Liberal	Independent	24 November 2020
Blue Mountains	Ward 3	Daniel Myles	Liberal	Independent	24 November 2020
Penrith	South	Brian Cartwright	Liberal	Independent	21 July 2021
Canada Bay	Mayor	Angelo Tsirekas	Labor	Our Local Community	19 October 2021
Randwick	West	Harry Stavrinos	Liberal	Our Local Community	24 October 2021
Ballina	A Ward	Stephen McCarthy	Independent National	Independent	1 November 2021
Parramatta	Rosehill	Andrew Wilson	Our Local Community	Small Business	8 November 2021
Hornsby	B Ward	Joe Nicita	Greens	Independent	Late 2023

== Results ==
Party	Votes	%	Swing	Seats (Note: Excluding directly-elected mayors.)	Change
Independents	1,392,142	33.73	–2.05	776	▼86
Labor	1,071,688	26.67	+1.05	188	▲3
Liberal	703,796	17.52	–7.99	127	▼13
Greens	355,196	8.84	+0.21	65	▲11
Independent Liberal	95,602	2.38	+1.08	8	▲3
Our Local Community	72,942	1.81	+0.08	10	▲6
Clover Moore Independent Team	47,877	1.19	–1.41	4	Steady
Your Northern Beaches	46,355	1.15	–8.00	6	Steady
Shoalhaven Independents Group	27,254	0.68	–0.63	4	▼1
Lake Mac Independents	24,922	0.62	–0.48	3	Steady
Dai Le	18,774	0.47	+0.47	3	▲3
Residents and Ratepayers	16,607	0.41	+0.41	4	▲4
Independent National	16,140	0.40		9	
Small Business	12,244	0.30	+0.30	1	▲1
Shooters, Fishers and Farmers	12,053	0.30	+0.12	5	▲3
Residents First Woollahra	10,951	0.27	–0.07	5	Steady
Liverpool Community Independents Team	10,803	0.27	–0.48	2	Steady
Animal Justice	9,724	0.24	+0.20	1	▲1
Lorraine Wearne Independents	9,423	0.24	+0.05	1	Steady
Community First Team	7,561	0.19	–0.22	1	Steady
Sustainable Australia	7,308	0.18	+0.18	2	▲2
Serving Mosman	6,870	0.17	–0.09	4	▲1
Good For Manly	6,629	0.17	–0.48	1	Steady
Ben Shields Team	5,687	0.14	+0.01	1	Steady
Totally Locally Committed	4,809	0.12	–0.33	1	▼1
Liberal Democrats	4,376	0.11	−0.09	0	▼1
Strathfield Independents	4,120	0.10	+0.03	2	▲1
Nella Hall Independents	3,298	0.09	–0.07	1	Steady
Independent Labor	2,892	0.08	–0.15	1	▼3
Our Sustainable Future	2,769	0.07	–0.19	1	Steady
Socialist Alliance	2,612	0.07	+0.05	0	Steady
Australia First	2,549	0.06	–0.10	0	Steady
Kogarah Residents Association	919	0.02	–0.14	0	▼1
Arts	536	0.01	+0.01	0	Steady
Science	536	0.01	+0.01	0	Steady
Communist League	116	0.01	+0.01	0	Steady
Independent One Nation	46	0.00	–0.16	0	▼1
Total	4,018,048	100.00	–	–	–
Registered voters / turnout	4,838,137	83.05	+6.45	–	–

=== Council totals ===
LGA	Seats (excluding directly-elected mayors)				
LGA	Labor	Liberal	Greens	Independents (Note: Including local groups (not to be confused with locally-registered political parties, which are counted here in the "Others" column).)	Others
Albury	1	Did not contest	1	7	Did not contest
Armidale	2	Did not contest	1	8	Did not contest
Ballina	0	Did not contest	2	7	Did not contest
Balranald	No election				
Bathurst	Did not contest	Did not contest	Did not contest	9	Did not contest
Bayside	7	Did not contest	1	7	Did not contest
Bega Valley	1	Did not contest	1	7	Did not contest
Bellingen	0	Did not contest	2	4	Did not contest
Berrigan	Did not contest	Did not contest	Did not contest	8	Did not contest
Blacktown	10	Did not contest	0	5	Did not contest
Bland	Did not contest	Did not contest	Did not contest	9	Did not contest
Blayney	Did not contest	Did not contest	Did not contest	7	Did not contest
Blue Mountains	3	6	2	1	Did not contest
Bogan	Did not contest	Did not contest	Did not contest	9	Did not contest
Bourke	No election				
Brewarrina	Did not contest	Did not contest	1	8	Did not contest
Broken Hill	2	Did not contest	Did not contest	8	Did not contest
Burwood	4	2	1	0	Did not contest
Byron	1	Did not contest	2	5	Did not contest
Cabonne	Did not contest	Did not contest	Did not contest	9	Did not contest
Camden	3	4	Did not contest	2	Did not contest
Campbelltown	7	4	0	1	3
Canada Bay	2	3	1	0	3
Canterbury-Bankstown	9	5	0	1	0
Carrathool	Did not contest	Did not contest	Did not contest	10	Did not contest
Central Coast	No election (Note: Before being dissolved the council was composed of six Labor, five Independents, two Liberals and two vacancies)				
Central Darling	No election				
Cessnock	6	3	Did not contest	4	Did not contest
Clarence Valley	Did not contest	Did not contest	1	8	Did not contest
Cobar	Did not contest	Did not contest	Did not contest	12	Did not contest
Coffs Harbour	1	Did not contest	1	6	0
Coolamon	Did not contest	Did not contest	Did not contest	8	1
Coonamble	Did not contest	Did not contest	Did not contest	9	Did not contest
Cootamundra-Gundagai	Did not contest	Did not contest	Did not contest	9	Did not contest
Cowra	Did not contest	Did not contest	Did not contest	9	Did not contest
Cumberland	8	Did not contest	0	3	4
Dubbo	3	Did not contest	Did not contest	7	Did not contest
Dungog	Did not contest	Did not contest	Did not contest	7	Did not contest
Edward River	Did not contest	Did not contest	Did not contest	9	Did not contest
Eurobodalla	1	Did not contest	1	7	Did not contest
Fairfield	3	Did not contest	0	7	3
Federation	Did not contest	Did not contest	Did not contest	9	Did not contest
Forbes	Did not contest	Did not contest	Did not contest	9	Did not contest
Georges River	5	5	Did not contest	1	4
Gilgandra	Did not contest	Did not contest	Did not contest	9	Did not contest
Glen Innes Severn	Did not contest	Did not contest	1	8	Did not contest
Goulburn Mulwaree	1	Did not contest	0	7	1
Greater Hume	Did not contest	Did not contest	Did not contest	9	Did not contest
Griffith	Did not contest	Did not contest	Did not contest	11	Did not contest
Gunnedah	Did not contest	Did not contest	Did not contest	9	Did not contest
Gwydir	Did not contest	Did not contest	Did not contest	9	Did not contest
Hawkesbury	2	4	1	3	2
Hay	Did not contest	Did not contest	Did not contest	8	Did not contest
Hilltops	Did not contest	Did not contest	Did not contest	11	Did not contest
Hornsby	1	6	3	0	Did not contest
Hunter's Hill	Did not contest	3	0	4	Did not contest
Inner West	8	Did not contest	5	2	0
Inverell	Did not contest	Did not contest	Did not contest	9	Did not contest
Junee	Did not contest	Did not contest	Did not contest	9	Did not contest
Kempsey	Did not contest	Did not contest	1	7	Did not contest
Kiama	2	Did not contest	2	5	Did not contest
Ku-ring-gai	Did not contest	Did not contest	Did not contest	10	Did not contest
Kyogle	Did not contest	Did not contest	Did not contest	9	Did not contest
Lachlan	Did not contest	Did not contest	Did not contest	10	Did not contest
Lake Macquarie	7	3	0	0	3
Lane Cove	3	3	1	2	Did not contest
Leeton	Did not contest	Did not contest	Did not contest	9	Did not contest
Lismore	1	Did not contest	2	6	1
Lithgow	Did not contest	Did not contest	Did not contest	9	Did not contest
Liverpool	4	5	0	2	Did not contest
Liverpool Plains	Did not contest	Did not contest	Did not contest	7	Did not contest
Lockhart	Did not contest	Did not contest	Did not contest	9	Did not contest
Maitland	4	4	0	5	Did not contest
Mid-Coast	1	2	1	7	Did not contest
Mid-Western	Did not contest	Did not contest	Did not contest	9	Did not contest
Moree Plains	Did not contest	Did not contest	Did not contest	9	Did not contest
Mosman	Did not contest	Did not contest	Did not contest	3	4
Murray River	Did not contest	Did not contest	Did not contest	9	Did not contest
Murrumbidgee	Did not contest	Did not contest	Did not contest	9	Did not contest
Muswellbrook	Did not contest	Did not contest	Did not contest	12	Did not contest
Nambucca Valley	1	Did not contest	Did not contest	8	Did not contest
Narrabri	Did not contest	Did not contest	Did not contest	9	Did not contest
Narrandera	Did not contest	Did not contest	Did not contest	9	Did not contest
Narromine	Did not contest	Did not contest	Did not contest	9	Did not contest
Newcastle	7	3	2	1	0
North Sydney	2	Did not contest	Did not contest	6	2
Northern Beaches	Did not contest	5	2	1	7
Oberon	Did not contest	Did not contest	Did not contest	9	Did not contest
Orange	Did not contest	Did not contest	1	9	1
Parkes	Did not contest	Did not contest	Did not contest	10	Did not contest
Parramatta	7	Did not contest	1	2	5
Penrith	5	6	Did not contest	4	Did not contest
Port Macquarie-Hastings	Did not contest	Did not contest	1	5	2
Port Stephens	4	1	0	4	Did not contest
Queanbeyan-Palerang	3	2	1	5	Did not contest
Randwick	5	5	4	1	Did not contest
Richmond Valley	1	Did not contest	Did not contest	5	Did not contest
Ryde	5	6	0	1	Did not contest
Shellharbour	3	Did not contest	Did not contest	4	Did not contest
Shoalhaven	3	Did not contest	4	2	4
Singleton	1	Did not contest	Did not contest	7	1
Snowy Monaro	2	Did not contest	1	8	Did not contest
Snowy Valleys	Did not contest	Did not contest	0	9	Did not contest
Strathfield	3	Did not contest	Did not contest	1	3
Sutherland	5	8	0	2	Did not contest
Sydney	1	2	1	1	4
Tamworth	1	Did not contest	Did not contest	8	Did not contest
Temora	Did not contest	Did not contest	Did not contest	9	Did not contest
Tenterfield	Did not contest	Did not contest	Did not contest	10	Did not contest
The Hills	3	9	0	0	0
Tweed	1	2	1	3	Did not contest
Upper Hunter	Did not contest	Did not contest	1	8	Did not contest
Upper Lachlan	Did not contest	Did not contest	Did not contest	9	Did not contest
Uralla	Did not contest	Did not contest	Did not contest	9	Did not contest
Wagga Wagga	2	Did not contest	1	6	Did not contest
Walcha	Did not contest	Did not contest	Did not contest	8	Did not contest
Walgett	Did not contest	Did not contest	Did not contest	9	Did not contest
Warren	Did not contest	Did not contest	Did not contest	12	Did not contest
Warrumbungle	Did not contest	Did not contest	Did not contest	9	Did not contest
Waverley	4	5	3	0	Did not contest
Weddin	Did not contest	Did not contest	Did not contest	9	Did not contest
Wentworth	Did not contest	Did not contest	Did not contest	9	Did not contest
Willoughby	Did not contest	Did not contest	Did not contest	13	Did not contest
Wingecarribee	No election				
Wollondilly	Did not contest	Did not contest	Did not contest	9	Did not contest
Wollongong	6	3	2	2	0
Woollahra	Did not contest	8	2	0	5
Yass Valley	Did not contest	Did not contest	1	8	Did not contest

== Referendums and polls ==
In addition to the local elections, eight LGAs held referendums on questions relating to electoral structures. An advisory poll on de-amalgamation was also held for Inner West.

The closest result was in Wagga Wagga, where 50.6% voted "No" to directly-electing the mayor.

LGA	Question	YES		NO		Informal		Turnout		Ref
LGA	Question	Votes	%	Votes	%	Votes	%	Total	%	Ref
Armidale	"Do you support a reduction in the number of councillors for Armidale Regional Council from eleven to nine?"	10,891	68.9	4,913	31.1	272	1.2	16,076	83.7	
Bega Valley	"Should the Bega Valley Shire have a popularly elected Mayor from 2024?"	16,507	72.7	6,192	27.3	559	2.4	23,258	87.1	
Dubbo	"Currently Dubbo Regional Council is divided into five wards that elect 10 councillors in total; do you favour abolishing this ward system in favour of a single area consisting of all voters that elects 11 councillors?"	22,087	74.6	7,524	25.4	957	3.1	30,568	82.3	
Griffith	"Do you agree that the number of Councillors elected to Griffith City Council be reduced from 12 to 9?"	10,010	71.4	4,017	28.6	531	3.6	14,558	86.7	
Griffith	"Do you agree that the election of the Mayor to Griffith City Council be changed from popularly elected to elected by Councillors?"	3,889	28.2	9,888	71.8	729	5.0	14,506	86.4	
Inner West (poll)	"In May 2016, Ashfield, Leichhardt and Marrickville councils were amalgamated into one local government area by the State Government. Do you support the Inner West local government area being de-amalgamated, so as to restore the former local government areas of Ashfield, Leichhardt and Marrickville?"	65,126	62.5	39,093	37.5	2,731	2.6	106,950	80.7	
Murray River	"Do you wish to remove the three wards currently in place (Moama, Greater Wakool and Greater Murray with three Councillors elected within each ward), within Murray River Council to become an undivided Local Government Area?"	2,139	34.5	4,067	65.5	66	1.1	6,272	71.3	
Ryde	"Do you support a popularly elected Mayor where the voters of the City of Ryde elect the Mayor for a four (4) year term, thereby adopting a thirteen (13) Councillor model (including the Mayor)?"	49,392	76.2	15,442	23.8	1,927	2.9	66,761	87.2	
Wagga Wagga	"The Mayor of Wagga Wagga is currently elected every two (2) years by the nine (9) Councillors. Do you approve of the direct election of the Mayor by the voters of Wagga Wagga, for a four (4) year term, noting this will result in increased election costs each and every election?"	18,330	49.4	18,786	50.6	1,290	3.4	38,406	83.0	
Walcha	"Do you favour the removal of the current ward based system so that all voters select all eight (8) Councillors that represent the Walcha Council area?"	1,142	61.2	723	38.8	19	1.0	1,884	83.0	

== Aftermath ==
=== Elected councillors ===
Logan Collins was elected to Cootamundra–Gundagai Regional Council at the age of 18, becoming the youngest local councillor in New South Wales history.

=== iVote crash and re-runs ===
Analysis commissioned by the NSWEC found 55 voters in Singleton, 54 in Shellharbour and 34 voters in Kempsey who attempted to use iVote were prevented from casting their vote. As a result, re-runs were ordered by the Supreme Court of NSW which were held on 30 July 2022 and iVote was not used for the 2023 state election.

== By-elections and countbacks ==
The New South Wales Electoral Commission has held a number of by-elections and countbacks to fill vacancies on councils since the 2021 elections.

Countbacks were introduced in January 2022 for council vacancies across the state, although by-elections are still used for some councils.

=== By-elections ===
Council	Ward	Before		Change		After			
Council	Ward	Councillor	Party	Cause	Date	Date	Councillor	Party	More
Murray River	Greater Murray	N/A	N/A	Only two out of three vacancies filled in 2021	4 December 2021	26 February 2022	Geoff Wise	Independent	Full results
Murray River	Greater Wakool	N/A	N/A	Only two out of three vacancies filled in 2021	4 December 2021	26 February 2022	Dennis Gleeson	Independent	Full results
Tenterfield	E Ward	N/A	N/A	Only two out of three vacancies filled in 2021	4 December 2021	26 February 2022	Geoffrey Nye	Independent	Full results
Cobar	Unsubdivided	N/A	N/A	Only 11 out of 12 vacancies filled in 2021	4 December 2021	26 February 2022	Michael Prince	Independent	Full results
Ryde	West	Jerome Laxale	Labor	Elected to Australian Parliament	22 July 2022	5 October 2022	Justin Li	Liberal	Full results
Lachlan	D Ward	Elaine Bendall	Independent	Death	4 December 2022	20 May 2023	Robyn Turner	Independent	Full results

=== Countbacks ===
Council	Ward	Before		Change		After		
Council	Ward	Councillor	Party	Cause	Date	Date	Councillor	Party
Upper Lachlan	Unsubdivided	John Stafford	Independent	Resignation	13 January 2022	23 February 2022	Nathan McDonald	Independent
Weddin	Unsubdivided	Chad White	Independent	Resignation	15 March 2022	20 April 2022	Glenda Howell	Independent
Weddin	Unsubdivided	Mark Liebich	Independent	Resignation	15 March 2022	20 April 2022	Jason Kenah	Independent
Weddin	Unsubdivided	Geoff McClelland	Independent	Resignation	15 March 2022	20 April 2022	Warwick Frame	Independent
Weddin	Unsubdivided	Carly Brown	Independent	Resignation	15 March 2022	20 April 2022	Jan Parlett	Independent
Edward River	Unsubdivided	Peter Connell	Independent	Death	1 April 2022	17 May 2022	Shannon Sampson	Independent
Hay	Unsubdivided	Peter Dwyer	Independent	Resignation	July 2022	26 August 2022	Darren Clarke	Independent
Snowy Monaro	Unsubdivided	John Last	Independent	Resignation	20 July 2022	26 August 2022	Luke Williamson	Independent
Georges River	Mortdale	Warren Tegg	Labor	Resignation	22 August 2022	21 September 2022	Ashvini Ambihaipahar	Labor
Snowy Monaro	Unsubdivided	John Castellari	Greens	Resignation	25 September 2022	26 October 2022	Craig Mitchell	Independent
Georges River	Peakhurst	Kevin Greene	Labor	Resignation	31 October 2022	16 November 2022	Veronica Ficarra	Labor
Upper Hunter	Unsubdivided	Sue Abbott	Greens	Resignation	2 November 2022	6 December 2022	Belinda McKenzie	Independent
Queanbeyan-Palerang	Unsubdivided	Jacqueline Ternouth	Liberal	Resignation	21 December 2022	7 February 2023	Ross Macdonald	Liberal
North Sydney	St Leonards	Alanya Drummond	Independent	Resignation	11 January 2023	21 February 2023	John Lepouris	Independent
Sydney	Unsubdivided	Jess Scully	Clover Moore Independent Team	Resignation	31 March 2023	9 May 2023	Adam Worling	Clover Moore Independent Team
Lithgow	Unsubdivided	Deanna Goodsell	Good for Council	Resignation	18 May 2023	21 June 2023	Steve Ring	Ring's Independent Lithgow
Parramatta	Epping	Donna Davis	Labor	Resignation	25 January 2024	TBC	TBC	TBC
Wentworth	Unsubdivided	Steve Heywood	Independent	Death	7 January 2024	TBC	TBC	TBC
