= 2024 Cumberland City Council election =

- 14 September 2024

All 15 seats on Cumberland City Council 8 seats needed for a majority
- Registered: 133,113
- Turnout: 81.4%

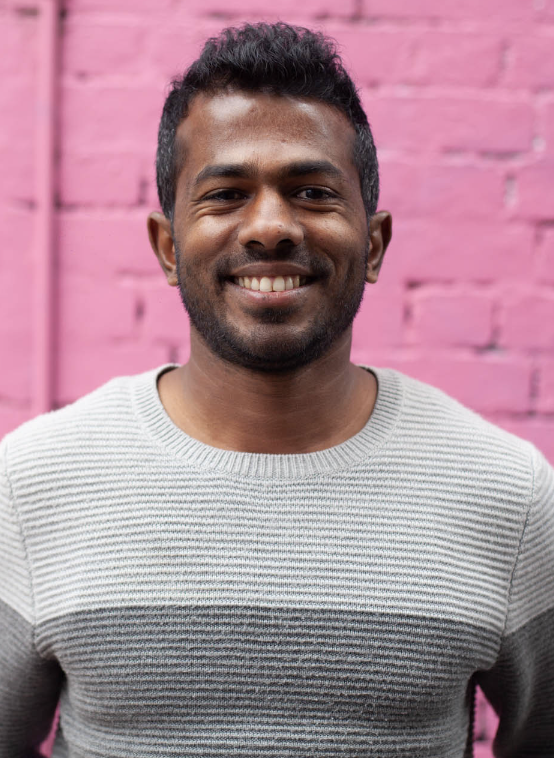
	First party	Second party	Third party
			OLC
Leader	N/A	N/A	Paul Garrard
Party	Labor	Liberal	OLC
Last election	8 seats	Did not contest	4 seats
Seats before	8	2	3
Seats won	5	4	3
Seat change	▼3	▲2	Steady
Primary vote	31,340	23,959	15,001
Percentage	31.7%	24.2%	15.2%
Swing	▼31.7	▲11.4 (Note: Compared with Independent Liberals in 2021.)	▼15.2
	Fourth party	Fifth party	Sixth party
	IND	PNP
Leader	N/A	Eddy Sarkis	Sujan Selven
Party	Independents	People Not Politics	Greens
Last election	0 seats	Did not exist	0 seats
Seats before	0	1	0
Seats won	1	1	1
Seat change	▲1	Steady	▲1
Primary vote	10,922	8,044	3,952
Percentage	11.0%	8.1%	4.0%
Swing	▲10.0	▲8.1	▲1.2

The 2024 Cumberland City Council election was held on 14 September 2024 to elect 15 councillors to Cumberland City Council. The election was held as part of the statewide local government elections in New South Wales.

The Labor Party lost its majority but remained the largest party on the council, winning five seats. The Liberal Party gained four seats after returning to endorsing candidates, while Our Local Community won three. Additionally, the Greens won a seat in Cumberland for the first time.

== Background ==
At the 2017 election, the Liberal Party won four seats and 26.2% of the council-wide vote. In 2021, the party chose not to endorse any candidates in Cumberland, with two Independent Liberals – Joseph Rahme (Granville Ward) and Michael Zaiter (Wentworthville Ward) – elected.

Greystanes Ward councillor Eddy Sarkis resigned from Our Local Community in February 2024 after losing preselection.

== Electoral system ==
Like in all other New South Wales local government areas (LGAs), Cumberland City Council elections use optional preferential voting. Under this system, voters are only required to vote for one candidate or group, although they can choose to preference other candidates.

All elections for councillor positions are elected using proportional representation. Cumberland has an Australian Senate-style ballot paper with above-the-line and below-the-line voting. The council is divided into five wards, each electing three councillors.

The election was conducted by the New South Wales Electoral Commission (NSWEC).

== Retiring councillors ==
=== Labor ===
- Sabrin Farooqui (Regents Park) – lost preselection on 17 February 2024
- Kun Huang (Regents Park) – lost preselection on 17 February 2024

== Candidates ==
Former Auburn mayor Ronney Oueik contested South Granville Ward. Tony Oldfield, who was elected to Auburn City Council in 2012 as a member of the Communist Party of Australia, ran in Regents Park Ward as a Battler candidate.

Eddy Sarkis and Zac Alameh both contested as "People Not Party Politics" candidates.

=== Granville ===
Our Local Community (Group A)	Liberal (Group B)	Labor (Group C)	Ungrouped
1. Steve Christou; 2. Najib Najibulla; 3. Samantha Sleiman	1. Joseph Rahme; 2. Marie Issa; 3. Jamie Sleiman	1. Ola Hamed; 2. Joshika Naidu; 3. John Treloar	David Appleby (Ind)

=== Greystanes ===
Labor (Group A)	People Not Politics (Group B)	The Independents (Group C)	Liberal (Group D)
1. Diane Colman; 2. Manu Devana; 3. Bob Hockey	1. Eddy Sarkis; 2. Manju Maheswaran; 3. Moreen Stephenson	1. Greg Cummings; 2. John Brodie; 3. Ray Semaan	1. Nadima Kafrouni-Saba; 2. Abraham Agopian; 3. Jasmine Issa

=== Regents Park ===
Independent (Group A)	Our Local Community (Group B)	Battler (Group C)	Liberal (Group D)	Labor (Group E)
1. Andrew Quah; 2. Mohamed Hassan; 3. Youwei Chung	1. Helen Hughes; 2. Charles Barden; 3. David Miller	1. Tony Oldfield; 2. Elizabeth Hanham; 3. Michael Stanislas	1. Steve Yang; 2. Estate John Park; 3. Alexander Kim	1. Enver Yasar; 2. Rafah Chalabi; 3. Michelle Joyce

=== South Granville ===
Independent (Group A)	Our Local Community (Group B)	Independent (Group C)
1. Ronney Oueik; 2. Haisheng Shi; 3. Ahmad Faizi	1. Paul Garrard; 2. Jeffrey Sun; 3. Margaret Allen	1. Ahmed Ouf; 2. Marwa Mosallam; 3. Selim Khalil
Liberal (Group D)	Battler (Group E)	Labor (Group F)
1. Ned Attie; 2. Fouad El-Ashwah; 3. Zaynoun Atie	1. Luke Ahern; 2. Ali Farhat; 3. Talb Humady	1. Glenn Elmore; 2. Mohamad Hussein; 3. Eda Tegin

=== Wentworthville ===
Greens (Group A)	People Not Politics (Group B)	Independent (Group C)
1. Sujan Selven; 2. Balaji Naranapatti; 3. Dorothea Newland	1. Zac Alameh; 2. Sai Darmarajah; 3. Nikita Desai	1. Mark Pigram; 2. Annie Staples; 3. Paul Axiak
Liberal (Group D)	Labor (Group E)	Ungrouped
1. Michael Zaiter; 2. Noelle Diab; 3. Melissa Rahme	1. Suman Saha; 2. Lisa Lake; 3. Thiru Arumugam	Elena Yakovleva (Ind)

== Results ==
=== Ward results ===
2024 Cumberland City Council election: Ward results
Party	Votes	%	Swing	Seats	Change
Labor	31,340	31.7	−16.9	5	▼3
Liberal	23,959	24.2	+11.4	4	▲2
Our Local Community	15,001	15.2	−13.1	3	▼1
Independents	10,922	11.0	+10.0	1	▲1
People Not Party Politics	8,044	8.1	+8.1	1	▲1
Greens	3,952	4.0	+1.2	1	▲1
The Independents	3,903	3.9	−2.6	0	▼1
Battler	1,848	1.9	+1.9	0	Steady
Formal votes	98,969	91.3			
Informal votes	9,368	8.7			
Total	108,337	100.0		15	
Registered voters / turnout	133,113	81.4			

=== Granville ===
2024 Cumberland City Council election: Granville Ward
Party	Candidate	Votes	%	±%
Labor	1. Ola Hamed (elected 1); 2. Joshika Naidu; 3. John Treloar	6,726	34.5	−8.0
Our Local Community	1. Steve Christou (elected 2); 2. Najib Najibulla; 3. Samantha Sleiman	6,274	32.2	−0.2
Liberal	1. Joseph Rahme (elected 3); 2. Marie Issa; 3. Jamie Sleiman	6,247	32.1	+10.0
Independent	David Appleby	229	1.2	
Total formal votes		19,476	90.3	
Informal votes		2,100	9.7	
Turnout		21,576	79.1	

=== Greystanes ===
2024 Cumberland City Council election: Greystanes Ward
Party	Candidate	Votes	%	±%
Labor	1. Diane Colman (elected 1); 2. Manu Devana; 3. Bob Hockey	6,310	29.7	−3.2
People Not Party Politics	1. Eddy Sarkis (elected 2); 2. Manju Maheswaran; 3. Moreen Stephenson	5,821	27.4	−7.4
Liberal	1. Nadima Kafrouni-Saba (elected 3); 2. Abraham Agopian; 3. Jasmine Issa	5,224	24.6	+23.0
The Independents	1. Greg Cummings; 2. John Brodie; 3. Ray Semaan	3,903	18.4	−12.3
Total formal votes		21,258	92.3	
Informal votes		1,765	7.7	
Turnout		23,023	85.5	

=== Regents Park ===
2024 Cumberland City Council election: Regents Park Ward
Party	Candidate	Votes	%	±%
Labor	1. Enver Yasar (elected 1); 2. Rafah Chalabi; 3. Michelle Joyce	7,049	36.3	−23.4
Our Local Community	1. Helen Hughes (elected 2); 2. Charles Barden; 3. David Miller	4,876	25.1	+5.6
Liberal	1. Steve Yang (elected 3); 2. Estate John Park; 3. Alexander Kim	3,584	18.5	+2.0
Independent	1. Andrew Quah; 2. Mohamed Hassan; 3. Youwei Chung	2,559	13.2	+13.2
Battler	1. Tony Oldfield; 2. Elizabeth Hanham; 3. Michael Stanislas	1,352	7.0	+7.0
Total formal votes		19,420	92.2	
Informal votes		1,641	7.8	
Turnout		21,061	84.2	

=== South Granville ===
2024 Cumberland City Council election: South Granville Ward
Party	Candidate	Votes	%	±%
Independent	1. Ahmed Ouf (elected 1); 2. Marwa Mosallam; 3. Selim Khalil	4,240	24.0	+24.0
Our Local Community	1. Paul Garrard (elected 2); 2. Jeffrey Sun; 3. Margaret Allen	3,851	21.8	−13.3
Labor	1. Glenn Elmore (elected 3); 2. Mohamad Hussein; 3. Eda Tegin	3,792	21.5	−43.4
Independent	1. Ronney Oueik; 2. Haisheng Shi; 3. Ahmad Faizi	2,963	16.8	+16.8
Liberal	1. Ned Attie; 2. Fouad El-Ashwah; 3. Zaynoun Atie	2,302	13.1	+13.1
Battler	1. Luke Ahern; 2. Ali Farhat; 3. Talb Humady	496	2.8	+2.8
Total formal votes		17,644	88.3	
Informal votes		2,346	11.7	
Turnout		19,990	76.3	

=== Wentworthville ===
2024 Cumberland City Council election: Wentworthville Ward
Party	Candidate	Votes	%	±%
Labor	1. Suman Saha (elected 1); 2. Lisa Lake; 3. Thiru Arumugam	7,463	35.3	−10.2
Liberal	1. Michael Zaiter (elected 2); 2. Noelle Diab; 3. Melissa Rahme	6,602	31.2	+9.4
Greens	1. Sujan Selven (elected 3); 2. Balaji Naranapatti; 3. Dorothea Newland	3,952	18.7	+5.1
People Not Party Politics	1. Zac Alameh; 2. Sai Darmarajah; 3. Nikita Desai	2,223	10.5	+10.5
Independent	1. Mark Pigram; 2. Annie Staples; 3. Paul Axiak	858	4.1	+4.1
Independent	Elena Yakovleva	73	0.3	+0.3
Total formal votes		21,171	93.3	
Informal votes		1,516	6.7	
Turnout		22,687	81.9	
