= 2024 Camden Council election =

- 14 September 2024

All 9 seats on Camden Council 5 seats needed for a majority
- Registered: 87,311
- Turnout: 85.6%

	First party	Second party
		IND
Party	Labor	Independents
Last election	3 seats	2 seats
Seats before	2	2
Seats won	3	3
Seat change	▲1	▲1
Primary vote	20,054	18,491
Percentage	29.7%	27.3%
Swing	▼3.3	▲4.8
	Third party	Fourth party
Party	Libertarian	Liberal
Last election	Did not contest	4 seats
Seats before	0	4
Seats won	2	1
Seat change	▲2	▼3
Primary vote	16,448	8,378
Percentage	24.3%	12.4%
Swing	▲24.3	▼31.6

The 2024 Camden Council election was held on 14 September 2024 to elect nine councillors to Camden Council. The election was held as part of the statewide local government elections in New South Wales.

The Labor Party and independents won three seats each, while the Libertarian Party gained two. The Liberal Party lost three of the four seats it held prior to the election, owing to a missed candidate nomination deadline which prevented some of its councillors from recontesting.

== Background ==
North Ward councillor Cindy Cagney resigned from the Labor Party in August 2024.

== Electoral system ==
Like in all other New South Wales local government areas (LGAs), Camden Council elections use optional preferential voting. Under this system, voters are only required to vote for one candidate or group, although they can choose to preference other candidates.

All elections for councillor positions are elected using proportional representation. Camden has an Australian Senate-style ballot paper with above-the-line and below-the-line voting. The council is divided into three wards, each electing three councillors.

The election was conducted by the New South Wales Electoral Commission (NSWEC).

== Retiring councillors ==
=== Labor ===
- Paul Farrow (South)

== Candidates ==
On 14 August 2024, the day that candidates nominations closed, the Liberal Party revealed they had missed the deadline to nominate 164 candidates in 16 different LGAs. This included all Liberal candidates in North Ward and South Ward.

North Ward councillor Cindy Cagney switched to South Ward.

=== Central ===
Independent (Group A)	Labor (Group B)	Liberal (Group C)	Ungrouped
1. Peter McLean; 2. Juliane Scuteri; 3. David Nethercote	1. Ashleigh Cagney; 2. Koady Williams; 3. Tahia Khair	1. Therese Fedeli; 2. Diana Zammit; 3. Salvatore Barone	Ewelina Ellsmore (SFF)

=== North ===
Independent (Group A)	Labor (Group B)	Libertarian (Group C)
1. Abha Suri; 2. Manish Tripathi; 3. Harsha Chopra	1. Eliza Rahman; 2. Molly Quinnell	1. Vince Ferreri; 2. Domenico Gattellari; 3. Stefanie Ferreri

=== South ===
Labor (Group A)	Camden Community First (Group B)	Libertarian (Group C)	Independent (Group D)	Ungrouped
1. Damien Quinnell; 2. Deniz Sabuncuoglu; 3. Brian Calcutt	1. Cindy Cagney; 2. Con Diomis; 3. Domenic Zappia	1. Rose Sicari; 2. Amanda Wihare; 3. Maria Cartisano	1. Eva Campbell; 2. Jill Leemen; 3. Keith Hart	Renee Sillato (Ind)

=== Withdrawn candidates ===
Party	Candidate	Ward	Details
Liberal	Usha Dommaraju	North	Incumbent councillor unable to recontest because of missed candidacy deadline.
Liberal	Lara Symkowiak	North	Incumbent councillor unable to recontest because of missed candidacy deadline.
Liberal	Russell Zammit	South	Incumbent councillor unable to recontest because of missed candidacy deadline.

== Results ==
=== Ward results ===
2024 Camden Council election: Ward results
Party	Votes	%	Swing	Seats	Change
Labor	20,054	29.7	−3.3	3	Steady
Independents	18,491	27.3	+4.8	3	▲1
Libertarian	16,448	24.3	+24.3	2	▲2
Liberal	8,378	12.4	−31.6	1	▼3
Camden Community First	3,677	5.4	+5.4	0	Steady
Shooters, Fishers and Farmers	568	0.8	+0.3	0	Steady
Formal votes	67,616	90.5			
Informal votes	7,115	9.5			
Total	74,731	100.0		9	
Registered voters / turnout	87,311	85.6			

=== Central ===
2024 Camden Council election: Central Ward
Party	Candidate	Votes	%	±%
Labor	1. Ashleigh Cagney (elected 2); 2. Koady Williams; 3. Tahia Khair	8,923	36.9	+0.5
Liberal	1. Therese Fedeli (elected 3); 2. Diana Zammit; 3. Salvatore Barone	8,378	34.7	−9.3
Independent	1. Peter McLean (elected 1); 2. Juliane Scuteri; 3. David Nethercote	6,295	26.1	+4.5
Shooters, Fishers, Farmers	Ewelina Ellsmore	568	2.4	+2.4
Total formal votes		24,164	92.5	−2.2
Informal votes		1,970	7.5	+2.2
Turnout		26,134	87.2	+0.5

=== North ===
2024 Camden Council election: North Ward
Party	Candidate	Votes	%	±%
Libertarian	1. Vince Ferreri (elected 2); 2. Domenico Gattellari; 3. Stefanie Ferreri	10,378	46.3	+46.3
Independent	1. Abha Suri (elected 1); 2. Manish Tripathi; 3. Harsha Chopra	6,511	29.0	+29.0
Labor	1. Eliza Rahman (elected 3); 2. Molly Quinnell	5,551	24.7	−10.6
Total formal votes		22,440	88.0	−6.4
Informal votes		3,062	12.0	+6.4
Turnout		25,502	84.1	−1.1

=== South ===
2024 Camden Council election: West Ward
Party	Candidate	Votes	%	±%
Libertarian	1. Rose Sicari (elected 2); 2. Amanda Wihare; 3. Maria Cartisano	6,070	28.9	+28.9
Labor	1. Damien Quinnell (elected 1); 2. Deniz Sabuncuoglu; 3. Brian Calcutt	5,580	26.6	+0.6
Independent	1. Eva Campbell (elected 3); 2. Jill Leemen; 3. Keith Hart	4,145	19.7	−12.8
Camden Community First	1. Cindy Cagney; 2. Con Diomis; 3. Domenic Zappia	3,677	17.5	+17.5
Independent	Renee Sillato	1,540	7.3	+7.3
Total formal votes		21,012	91.0	−3.7
Informal votes		2,083	9.0	+3.7
Turnout		23,095	85.4	+0.2
