= The Local Independent Party =

- Abbreviation: TLIP; LIP
- Registered officer: Francois Tarabay
- Founded: 2017
- Headquarters: Wetherill, New South Wales, Australia
- Ideology: Localism
- Local government: 0 / 1,480

The Local Independent Party (TLIP or LIP) is an Australian political party that competes in local elections in New South Wales.

Unlike many other local government political parties in Australia, the party competes in elections for several different councils.

== History ==
The party was formed ahead of the 2017 New South Wales local elections. Two councillors who were formerly members of the Liberal Party − John Hugh (Parramatta) and Nasr Kafrouni (Cumberland) − joined the party.

At the elections, the party received 0.65% of the total statewide vote but was not successful in getting any candidates elected.

The party did not contest the 2021 New South Wales local elections, although is still registered with the New South Wales Electoral Commission (NSWEC) as of July 2024.
