= City of Parramatta =

- Local government area
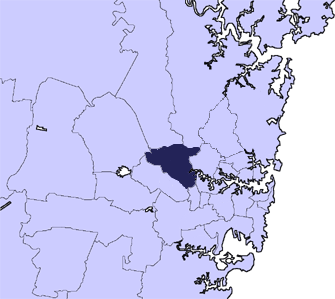
- Located in Metropolitan Sydney

- Interactive map of City of Parramatta
- Coordinates: 33°49′S 151°00′E
- Country: Australia
- State: New South Wales
- Region: Greater Western Sydney; Northern Sydney
- Established: 27 November 1861 (Municipality); 27 October 1938 (City)
- Council seat: Parramatta Town Hall

Government
  - Lord Mayor: Cameron MacLean
  - State electorate: *Epping; Parramatta; Ryde; Winston Hills
  - Federal division: *Bennelong; Berowra; Blaxland; Mitchell; Parramatta; Reid

Area
  - Total: 84 km^{2} (32 sq mi)

Population
  - Total: 256,729 (2021 census) (12th)
  - Density: 3,056/km^{2} (7,920/sq mi)
- Time zone: UTC+10 (AEST)
  - Summer (DST): UTC+11 (AEDT)
- Postcode: 2153, 2152, 2151, 2150, 2147, 2146, 2145, 2142, 2141, 2128, 2127, 2122, 2121, 2119, 2118, 2117, 2116, 2115, 2114
- Website: City of Parramatta
LGAs around City of Parramatta
| Blacktown | The Hills | Hornsby |
| Cumberland | City of Parramatta | Ryde |
| Cumberland | Cumberland | Canada Bay & Strathfield |

The City of Parramatta, also known as Parramatta Council, is a local government area located to the west and north-west of Sydney CBD in the Greater Western Sydney region. Parramatta Council is situated between the City of Ryde and Cumberland, where the Cumberland Plain meets the Hornsby Plateau, approximately 25 kilometres (16 mi) west of the Sydney central business district, in New South Wales, Australia. The city occupies an area of 84 square kilometres (32 sq mi) spanning across suburbs in Greater Western Sydney including the Hills District, and a small section of Northern Sydney to the far north east of its area. According to the 2021 census, City of Parramatta had an estimated population of 256,729. The city houses the Parramatta central business district which is one of the key suburban employment destinations for the region of Greater Western Sydney.

== History ==
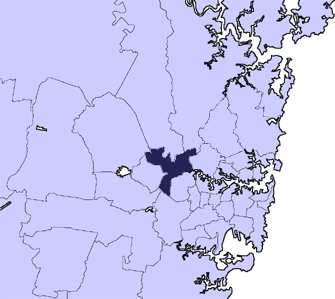
City of Parramatta boundaries, 1949–2016

First incorporated on 27 November 1861 as the "Municipality of Parramatta", the first mayor was emancipated convict John Williams who arrived in the colony in 1835. The council became known as the "Borough of Parramatta" on 23 December 1867 following the enactment of the Municipalities Act, 1867, and became a Municipality again following the 1906 Local Government Act. On 27 October 1938, the Local Government (City of Parramatta) Act was passed by the Parliament of New South Wales and proclaimed by the governor, Lord Wakehurst, making the town the "City of Parramatta".

From 1 January 1949 the "City of Parramatta" was re-formed following the passing of the Local Government (Areas) Act 1948, when the councils of Ermington and Rydalmere (incorporated 1891), Dundas (incorporated 1889) and Granville (incorporated 1885) were merged into the council area. The Parramatta local government area was further expanded through the transfer of 10.7 km^{2} from the Municipality of Blacktown in 1972 taking in Winston Hills which has not serviced since this time. In recognition of Parramatta's role Bi-centennial (coinciding with the Australian Bi-centennial), the title of 'Lord Mayor' was granted on 12 December 1988 by Queen Elizabeth II on the recommendation of Premier Nick Greiner. This made Parramatta the third Australian city that was not a capital to receive such an honour, after Newcastle and Wollongong.

=== 2016 amalgamation ===
A 2015 review of local government boundaries by the NSW Government Independent Pricing and Regulatory Tribunal recommended that the City of Parramatta be reformed, adding areas from several adjoining councils. The NSW Government subsequently proposed a merger of parts of Parramatta (Woodville Ward), Auburn and Holroyd and a second merger of parts of the rest of Parramatta and parts of Auburn, The Hills, Hornsby, and Holroyd to form a new council.

On 12 May 2016, Parramatta City Council was abolished by the NSW Government. Parts of Auburn City Council (south of the M4 Western Motorway) and Parramatta City Council (Woodville Ward), and Holroyd City Council merged to form the Cumberland Council as a new local government area and the remainder of the Parramatta City Council, Auburn City Council north of the M4 Western Motorway (including Sydney Olympic Park), and small parts of Hornsby Shire, Holroyd and The Hills Shire were merged into the reformed "City of Parramatta".

== Suburbs in the local government area ==
Suburbs in the City of Parramatta are:

- Baulkham Hills (shared with The Hills Shire)
- Beecroft (shared with Hornsby Shire)
- Camellia
- Carlingford
- Clyde
- Constitution Hill
- Dundas
- Dundas Valley
- Eastwood (shared with the City of Ryde)
- Epping
- Ermington
- Granville (shared with Cumberland City Council)
- Harris Park
- Lidcombe (shared with Cumberland City Council)
- Mays Hill (shared with Cumberland City Council)
- Melrose Park (shared with City of Ryde)
- Newington
- North Parramatta
- Northmead
- North Rocks (shared with The Hills Shire)
- Oatlands
- Old Toongabbie
- Parramatta
- Pendle Hill (shared with Cumberland City Council)
- Rosehill
- Rydalmere
- Seven Hills (shared with City of Blacktown)
- Silverwater
- Sydney Olympic Park [Autonomous]
- Telopea
- Toongabbie (shared with City of Blacktown and Cumberland City Council)
- Winston Hills (shared with The Hills Shire)
- Wentworth Point
- Wentworthville (shared with Cumberland City Council)
- Westmead (shared with Cumberland City Council)

== Facilities ==
The City of Parramatta Council operates a central library, heritage centre and six branch libraries at Carlingford, Constitution Hill, Dundas Valley, Epping, Ermington and Wentworth Point. It also provides a public swimming pool at Epping, five childcare centres and over ten community centres. The heritage-listed Parramatta Town Hall was completed in 1883 and houses the original council chamber meeting rooms as well as other function rooms.

The City of Parramatta also operates a new waste collection service, FOGO. It started on 11 November 2024, and is aimed to reduce food scraps in landfill.

== Demographics ==
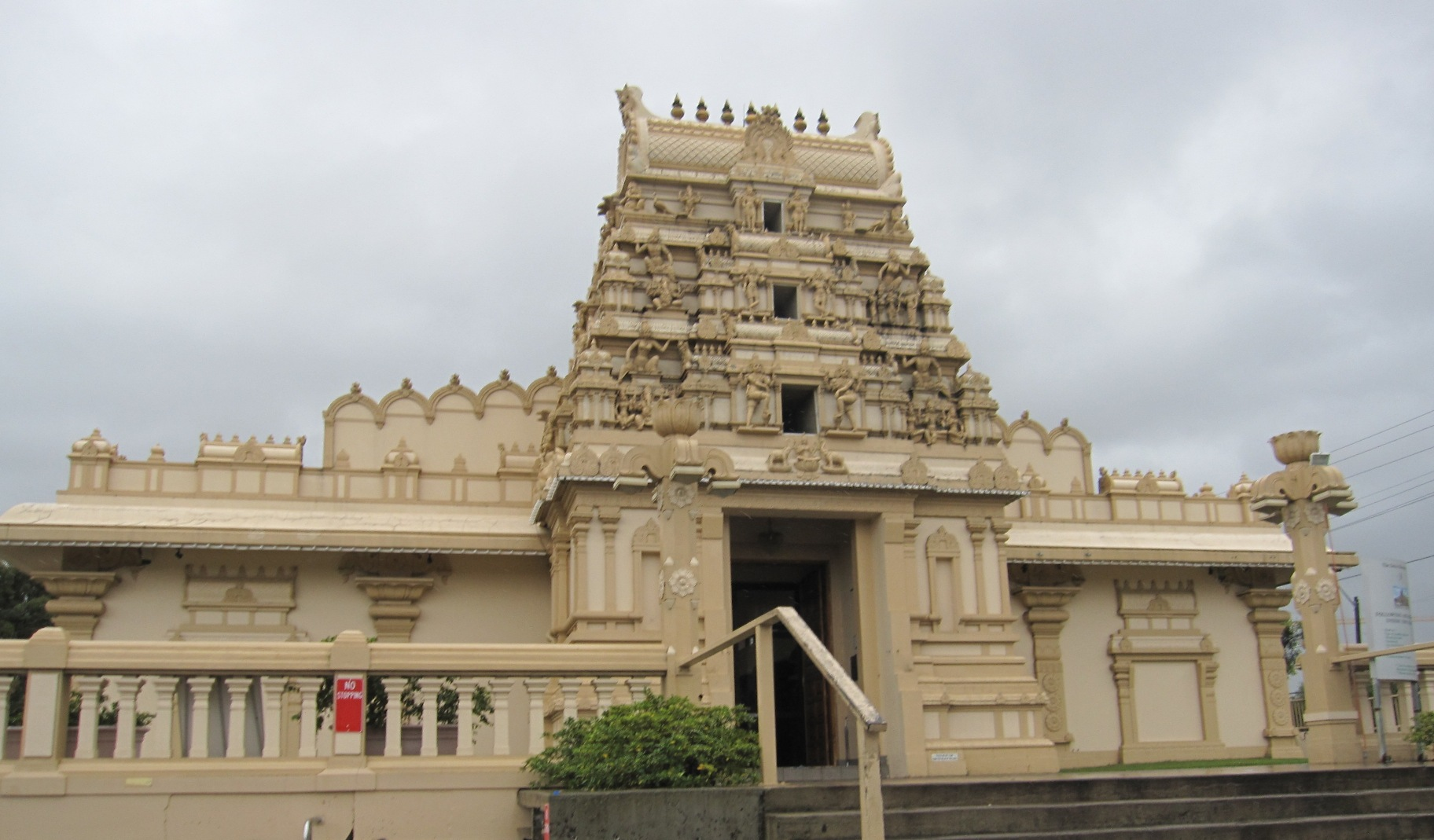
Sydney Murugan Temple, a Hindu temple in Mays Hill

At the 2021 Australian census, there were 256,729 people in the City of Parramatta local government area that comprised 84 square kilometres (32 sq mi), of these 50.1% were male and 49.9% were female. Aboriginal and Torres Strait Islander people made up 0.8% of the population. The median age of people in the City of Parramatta was 35 years; notably below the national median of 38 years. Children aged 0 – 14 years made up 18.2% of the population and people aged 65 years and over made up 12.5% of the population. Of people in the area aged 15 years and over, 53.4% were married and 9.5% were either divorced or separated.

At the 2021 Census, the Parramatta local government area was linguistically diverse, with a significantly higher than average proportion (61.8%) where two or more languages are spoken (national average was 24.8%); and a significantly lower proportion (38.2) where English only was spoken at home (national average was 72%). The most commonly reported religious affiliation was "no religion", at 29.7%. The proportion of residents who stated a religious affiliation with Hinduism was over four times the national average, with the median weekly income for residents slightly above the national average.

Selected historical census data for Parramatta local government area
| Census year | | 2001 | 2006 | 2011 | 2016 | 2021 |
|---|---|---|---|---|---|---|
| Population | Estimated residents on census night | 143,143 | 148,323 | 166,858 | 226,149 | 256,729 |
| Population | LGA rank in terms of size within New South Wales | | 11th | 11th | ▲5th | 5th |
| Population | % of New South Wales population | | | 2.41% | ▲3.02% | ▲3.18% |
| Population | % of Australian population | 0.76% | ▼0.75% | ▲0.78% | ▲0.97% | ▲1.00% |
| Cultural and language diversity | | | | | | |
| Ancestry, top responses | Australian | 23.9% | ▼22.9% | ▼18.1% | ▼13.1% | ▲13.9% |
| Ancestry, top responses | English | 21.8% | ▼17.8% | ▼16.8% | ▼13.7% | ▲14.4% |
| Ancestry, top responses | Chinese | 9.4% | ▲11.2% | ▲13.0% | ▲16.4% | ▲22.3% |
| Ancestry, top responses | Lebanese | 9.5% | ▲9.7% | ▼9.5% | ▼3.6% | ▼3.5% |
| Ancestry, top responses | Indian | 3.4% | ▲5.9% | ▲9.1% | ▲10.1% | ▲11.2% |
| Language, top responses (other than English) | Arabic | 10.1% | ▲10.7% | ▼10.3% | ▼3.2% | 3.2% |
| Language, top responses (other than English) | Mandarin | 3.0% | ▲4.7% | ▲5.9% | ▲10.5% | ▲12.4% |
| Language, top responses (other than English) | Cantonese | 4.6% | ▲5.0% | 5.0% | ▲6.5% | ▼6.4% |
| Language, top responses (other than English) | Korean | 2.0% | ▲2.1% | ▲2.7% | ▲5.0% | ▲5.2% |
| Language, top responses (other than English) | Hindi | 1.3% | ▲2.0% | ▲2.6% | ▲3.6% | ▼3.7% |
| Religious affiliation | | | | | | |
| Religious affiliation, top responses | Catholic | 27.1% | ▼26.0% | ▼23.4% | ▼20.8% | ▼18.9% |
| Religious affiliation, top responses | No religion | 10.7% | ▲12.8% | ▲15.0% | ▲24.5% | ▲29.7% |
| Religious affiliation, top responses | Anglican | 15.8% | ▼12.9% | ▼10.3% | ▼8.3% | ▼6.0% |
| Religious affiliation, top responses | Islam | 7.0% | ▲8.2% | ▲9.7% | ▼4.3% | ▲5.5% |
| Religious affiliation, top responses | Hinduism | 2.8% | ▲5.3% | ▲8.8% | ▲11.3% | ▲12.9% |
| Median weekly incomes | | | | | | |
| Personal income | Median weekly personal income | | A$443 | A$544 | A$722 | A$908 |
| Personal income | % of Australian median income | | 95.1% | 94.3% | 109.1% | 112.8% |
| Family income | Median weekly family income | | A$1,043 | A$1,451 | A$1,933 | A$2,298 |
| Family income | % of Australian median income | | 101.6% | 98.0% | 111.5% | 108.4% |
| Household income | Median weekly household income | | A$1,172 | A$1,288 | A$1,759 | A$2,051 |
| Household income | % of Australian median income | | 100.0% | 104.4% | 122.3% | 117.5% |
| Dwelling structure | | | | | | |
| Dwelling type | Separate house | 61.2% | ▼56.2% | ▼52.8% | ▼45.7% | ▼38.9% |
| Dwelling type | Semi-detached, terrace or townhouse | 10.7 | ▲12.4% | ▲13.4% | ▲15.2% | ▼13.3% |
| Dwelling type | Flat or apartment | 26.8% | ▲30.7% | ▲33.5% | ▲38.4% | ▲47.3% |

== Council ==
City of Parramatta Council

Leadership
- Lord Mayor: Cameron MacLean (Labor)
- Deputy Lord Mayor: Kellie Darley (Community Champions)

Structure
- Seats: 15 councillors
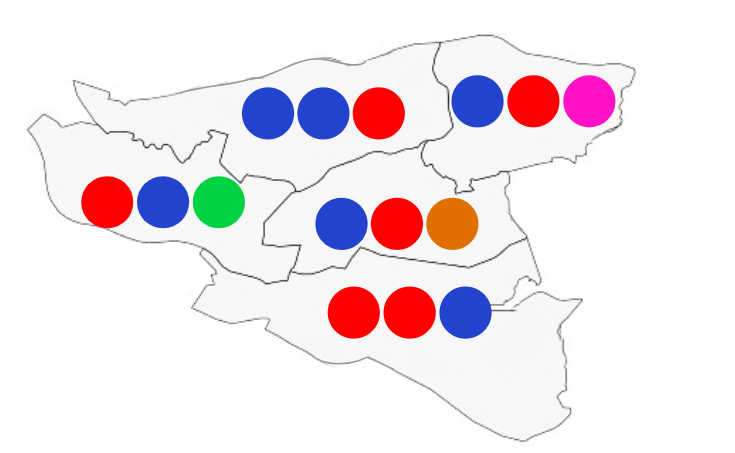
- Map of elected councillors by party in each of the 5 wards
- Political groups: Liberal (6); Labor (6) Community Champions (1) Greens (1) Lorraine Wearne Independents (1)

Elections
- Voting system: Single transferable vote
- Last election: 14 September 2024
- Next election: 16 September 2028

Meeting place
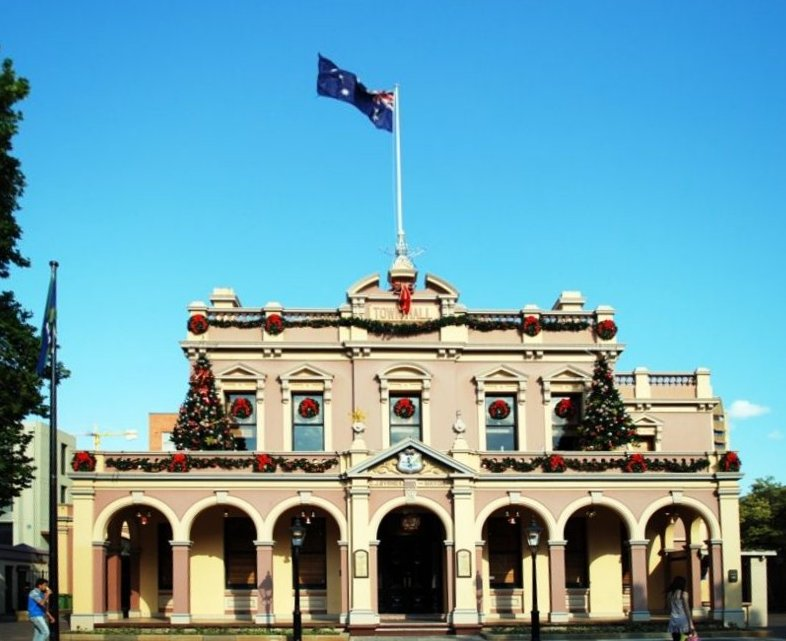
- Parramatta Town Hall, the seat of the council since 1883

Between May 2016 and September 2017, the council was managed by an administrator appointed by the Government of New South Wales, Amanda Chadwick, until the first election for councillors took place on 9 September 2017. The City of Parramatta Council comprises fifteen councillors elected proportionally, with three councillors in each ward. All councillors are elected for a fixed four-year term of office. The Lord Mayor is elected for a two-year term, with the Deputy Lord Mayor for one year, by the councillors at the first meeting of the council.

=== Current composition ===
The most recent election was held on 14 September 2024, and the makeup of the council, in order of election by ward, is as follows:

| Ward | Councillor | Party | Notes |
|---|---|---|---|
| Dundas Ward | Anthony Ellard | Labor | Elected 2024 |
| Dundas Ward | Tanya Raffoul | Independent | Elected 2024 |
| Dundas Ward | Kellie Darley | Community Champions | Elected 2021, Deputy Lord Mayor 2026–2027 |
| Epping Ward | Sreeni Pillamarri | Liberal | Elected 2024, previously Hornsby Shire Councillor 2021–2024 |
| Epping Ward | Cameron MacLean | Labor | Elected 2021, Deputy Lord Mayor 2023, Deputy Lord Mayor 2024–2025, Lord Mayor 2026–2028 |
| Epping Ward | Charles Chen | Lorraine Wearne Independents | Elected 2024, Deputy Lord Mayor 2025 |
| North Rocks Ward | Hayley French | Labor | Elected 2024 |
| North Rocks Ward | Georgina Valjak | Liberal | Elected 2021 as independent, re-elected 2024 as Liberal |
| North Rocks Ward | Manning Jeffrey | Liberal | Elected 2024 |
| Parramatta Ward | Sameer Pandey | Labor | Elected 2017, Deputy Lord Mayor 2022–2023, Lord Mayor 2023 |
| Parramatta Ward | Martin Zaiter | Liberal | Re-elected 2024, Lord Mayor 2024–2026 |
| Parramatta Ward | Judy Greenwood | Greens | Elected 2024 |
| Rosehill Ward | Patricia Prociv | Labor | Elected 2017, Deputy Lord Mayor 2023–2024. |
| Rosehill Ward | Steven Issa | Liberal | First elected 2012, Lord Mayor 2021, re-elected 2024, |
| Rosehill Ward | Michael Ng | Labor | Elected 2024 |

=== Officeholders ===
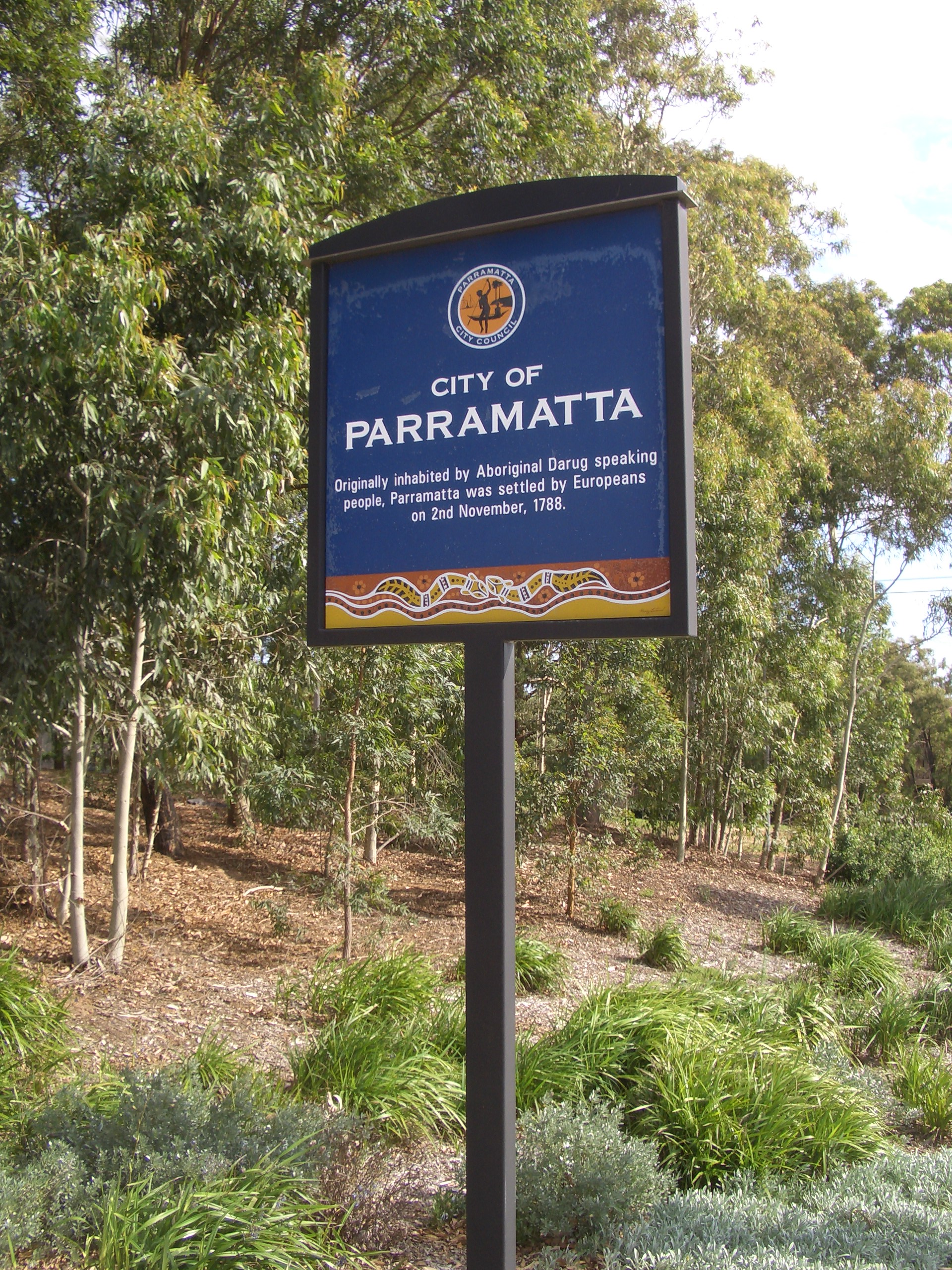
City of Parramatta sign, Pennant Hills Road, Carlingford

| Office-holder | | Term | Notes |
|---|---|---|---|
| Lord Mayor | Martin Zaiter | 14 October 2024 – present | |
| Deputy Lord Mayor | Cameron Maclean | 14 October 2024 – 8 September 2025 | |
| Deputy Lord Mayor | Charles Chen | 8 Sept 2025 | |
| CEO | | Term | Notes |
| Greg Dyer | | 12 May 2016 – 19 January 2018 | CEO, Parramatta City Council 3 February 2014 – 12 May 2016 |
| Sue Coleman (interim) | | 19 January 2018 – 10 July 2018 | Group Manager City Services |
| Mark Stapleton | | 10 July 2018 – 11 March 2019 | Director of Property and Significant Assets |
| Rik Hart (Acting) | | 11 March 2019 – 16 September 2019 | former General Manager, Warringah and Inner West Councils |
| Brett Newman | | 16 September 2019 – September 2022 | former CEO, Property NSW |
| Gail Connolly | | 28 March 2023 – 13 October 2025 | former General Manager, Georges River Council |
| George Bounassif (Acting) | | 13 October 2025 – present | Executive Director, City Services and Projects |

== Election results ==
=== 2024 ===
2024 Parramatta City Council election: Ward results
| Party | Votes | % | Swing | Seats | Change |
|---|---|---|---|---|---|
| Liberal | 41,777 | 35.7 | +30.0 (Note: Compared with Independent Liberals in 2021.) | 6 | ▲5 |
| Labor | 36,344 | 31.1 | −10.4 | 6 | ▼1 |
| Community Champions | 12,735 | 10.9 | −6.7 | 1 | Steady |
| Our Local Community | 11,902 | 10.2 | −9.2 | 0 | ▼4 |
| Greens | 7,499 | 6.4 | −3.7 | 1 | Steady |
| Lorraine Wearne Independents | 3,772 | 3.2 | −5.3 | 1 | Steady |
| Paul Noack Independents | 1,471 | 1.3 | +1.3 | 0 | Steady |
| Libertarian | 1,355 | 1.2 | −0.8 | 0 | Steady |
| Independents | 27 | 0.0 | | 0 | Steady |
| Formal votes | 116,882 | 95.3 | | | |
| Informal votes | 5,809 | 4.7 | | | |
| Total | 122,691 | 100.0 | | 15 | |
| Registered voters / turnout | 145,578 | 84.3 | | | |

=== 2021 ===
The Liberal Party did not endorse any candidates, including its six councillors elected in 2017.

2021 New South Wales local elections: Parramatta
| Party | Votes | % | Swing | Seats | Change |
|---|---|---|---|---|---|
| Labor | 46,022 | 41.5 | +10.3 | 7 | ▲2 |
| Our Local Community | 21,476 | 19.4 | +12.3 | 4 | ▲2 |
| Greens | 11,233 | 10.1 | +2.7 | 1 | Steady |
| Lorraine Wearne Independents | 9,423 | 8.5 | +4.4 | 1 | Steady |
| Independent Liberal | 6,310 | 5.7 | −30.8 (Note: Compared with the Liberal Party result at the 2017 election.) | 1 | ▼5 |
| Kellie Darley Independents | 4,637 | 4.2 | +4.2 | 1 | ▲1 |
| Lee Malkoun Independents | 3,489 | 3.1 | −5.9 (Note: Compared with The Local Independent Party result at the 2017 election.) | 0 | Steady |
| Small Business | 3,126 | 2.8 | +2.8 | 0 | Steady |
| Liberal Democrats | 2,161 | 2.0 | +2.0 | 0 | Steady |
| Independent | 1,882 | 1.7 | | 0 | |
| Community Need Not Corporate Greed | 1,026 | 0.9 | +0.9 | 0 | Steady |
| Formal votes | 110,785 | 95.23 | | | |
| Informal votes | 5,547 | 4.77 | | | |
| Total | 116,332 | 100.0 | | | |

== Sister cities ==
- Beersheba, Israel
- Cebu City, Philippines
- Jung District, Seoul, South Korea
- Phetchaburi, Thailand
- Putian, China
- Vũng Tàu, Vietnam

== See also ==
- Local government areas of New South Wales
