= Steve Christou =

Australian politician (born 1978)

Councillor Steve Christou
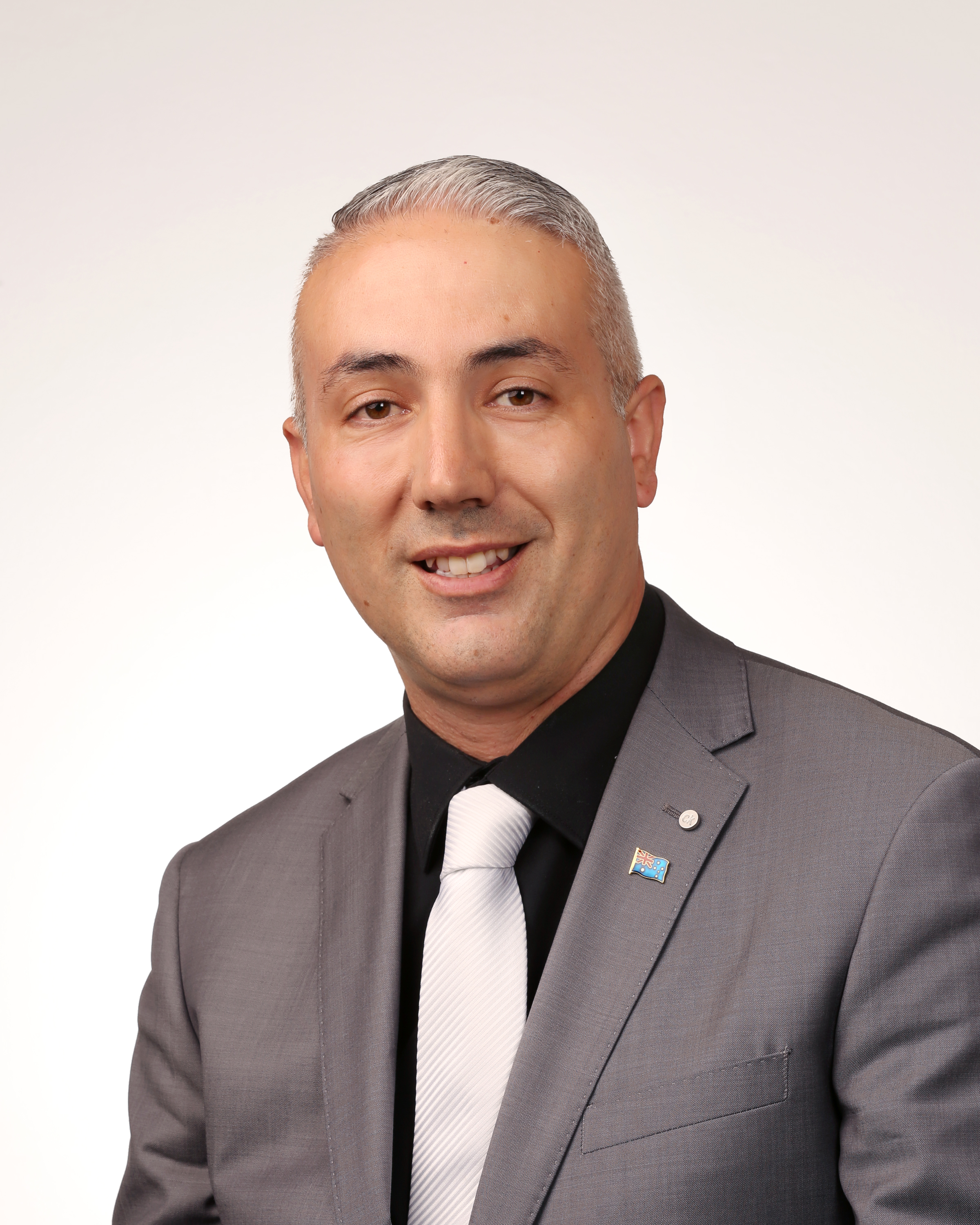
- Christou in 2022

Councillor of Cumberland City Council for Granville Ward
- Incumbent
- Assumed office 9 September 2017

Mayor of Cumberland
- In office September 2019 – January 2022
- Deputy: Eddy Sarkis; Michael Zaiter
- Preceded by: Greg Cummings
- Succeeded by: Lisa Lake

Personal details
- Born: 23 January 1978 (age 48) Erskineville, New South Wales, Australia
- Party: Libertarian (2024–present)
- Other political affiliations: Our Local Community (2019–2024); Labor (until 2019)

Steve Christou (born 23 January 1978) is an Australian politician who has served as a councillor of Cumberland City Council since 2017, representing Granville Ward. He previously served as the mayor of Cumberland between September 2019 and January 2022.

Christou is a member of the Libertarian Party, having previously been a member of the Labor Party and Our Local Community. He also has an association with One Nation.

== Political career ==
In 2017, Christou first ran for council under the newly amalgamated Cumberland City Council as a member of the Labor Party, which became one of the five biggest councils in New South Wales, and represents approximately 245,000 people. Christou was elected as councillor for the Granville Ward in September 2017.

In September 2019, Christou was elected as Mayor of Cumberland City Council under the Labor Party. However, during his acceptance speech, he resigned from Labor after almost 18 years of membership, citing his personal view that the party no longer represented working class values. Christou stated that he wouldn't have Labor head office dictating to him how he should vote on same sex marriage and late term abortions.

Christou joined the Our Local Community (OLC) political party in 2019. At the 2021 local council elections, Christou was re-elected to his seat in the Granville Ward. With the Labor Party being elected with a majority of seats, Christou's Our Local Community Party became the opposition. However, he kept his seat as councillor for the Granville Ward.

Christou ran in the 2022 federal election for the seat of Parramatta. He received 3.54% of the vote.

Christou was re-elected again in the Granville Ward at the 2024 local council elections however he resigned membership of Our Local Community (OLC) citing the party's purported negotiations with Labor in an attempt to broker a deal which would involve the party supporting a Labor Mayor. In December 2024, he joined the Libertarian Party.

=== Senate candidacy ===
Christou was the fourth position candidate on the Libertarian–HEART–People First joint ticket for the Senate in New South Wales at the 2025 federal election.

== Political views ==
Christou holds conservative political views and has an active interest in a number of political and social issues.

=== COVID-19 lockdown ===
During the COVID-19 pandemic, Christou expressed opposition to some restrictions, stating that the lockdowns were akin to living in "Nazi Germany and Kazakhstan", citing disparity in rules between the eastern and western suburbs of Sydney.

When Victorian premier Daniel Andrews classified Cumberland as a "red zone" and banned Cumberland residents from entering Victoria, Christou held a press conference labelling Andrews a "bedwetter".

=== ISIS brides repatriation ===
Christou was critical of the federal government's decision to bring back and repatriate families of ISIS fighters.

=== Australia Day celebrations ===
Christou is a supporter of retaining Australia Day celebrations on 26 January.

=== LGBTQ+ motions ===
In February 2024, Christou proposed a motion to stop drag queen story time for children in Cumberland. The motion was initially denied. However, in a rescission motion, to which local residents turned up to the Council meeting to protest in support of Christou's motion, the proposal was passed and drag queen story time events were banned from being held at public facilities in the Cumberland region, including libraries and halls.

In May 2024, Christou proposed a ban on same-sex parenting books in the eight libraries located in the Cumberland local government area. Initially the proposal was passed at a Council meeting. However, it was overturned two weeks later following community backlash.

=== Voice to Parliament ===
Christou opposed the Voice to Parliament referendum.

Since the defeat of the Voice, Christou has been vocal against proposed council partnerships with indigenous land councils and made a commitment to stop Welcome to Country, and smoking ceremonies if elected at upcoming council elections, citing the goal of better representing Australian values as well as the diverse cultures within the Cumberland community.
