= 2017 New South Wales local elections =

- 9 September 2017

46 of the 128 local government areas in New South Wales
- Registered: 2,730,000
- Turnout: 76.60%

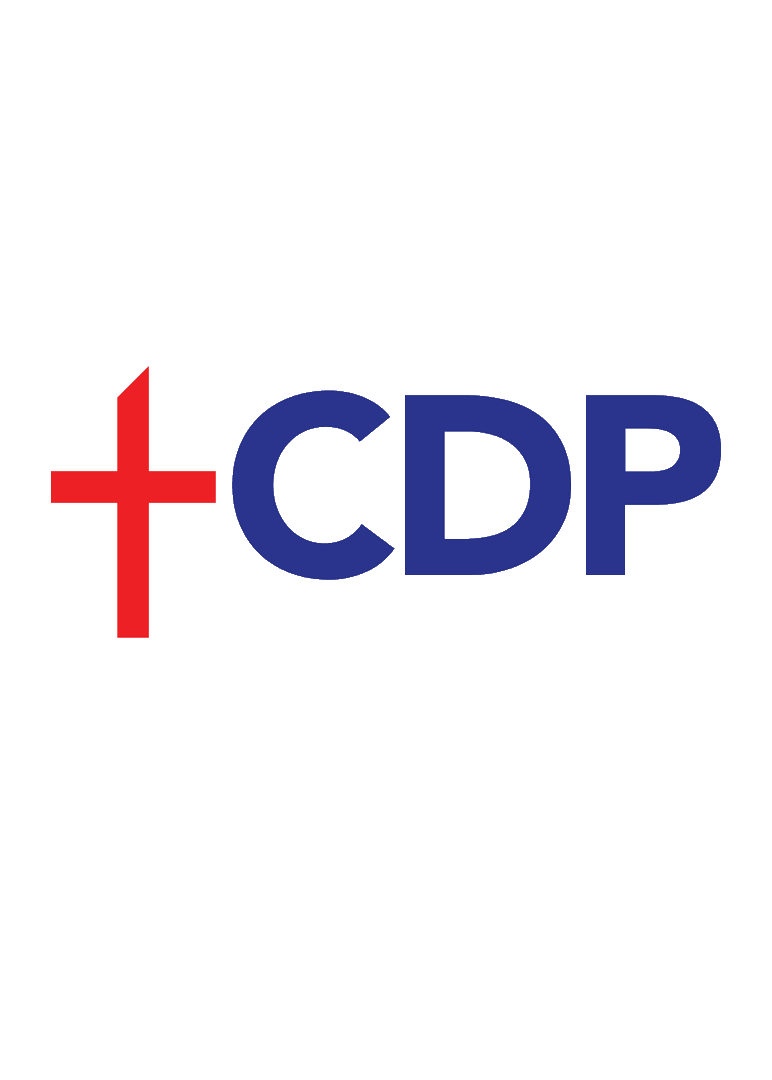

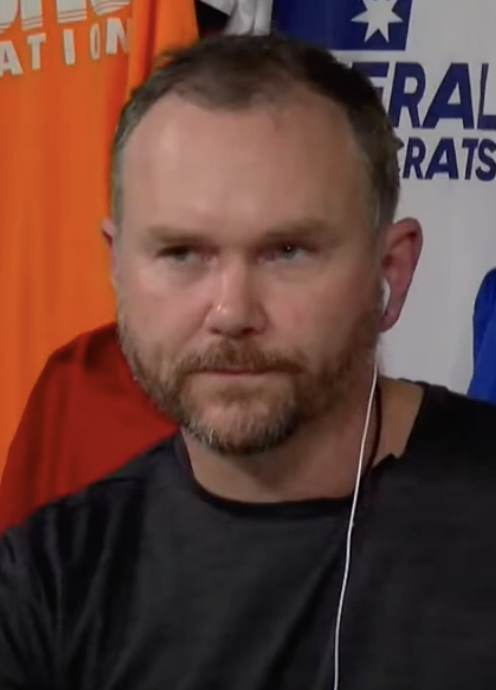

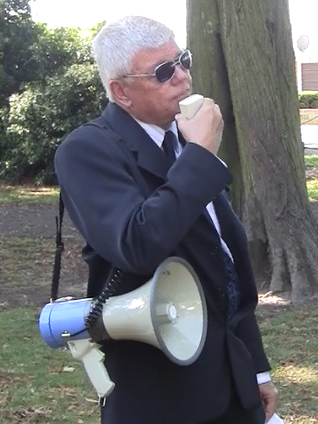
| | First party | Second party | Third party |
|---|---|---|---|
| | IND |
| Leader | N/A | N/A | N/A |
| Party | Independents | Labor | Liberal |
| Last election | (Note: This does not include seats in 79 LGAs that were won in 2016 but not up for re-election until the 2021 local elections.) |
| Seats won | 241 | 105 | 96 |
| Popular vote | 687,863 | 535,852 | 533,377 |
| Percentage | 32.26% | 25.62% | 25.50% |
| | Fourth party | Fifth party | Sixth party |
| | | OLC |
| Leader | No leader | Paul Garrard | Fred Nile |
| Party | Greens | OLC | Christian Democrats |
| Last election | | Did not exist | 0 |
| Seats before | | 1 | 0 |
| Seats won | 31 | 4 | 0 |
| Seat change | | ▲3 | Steady |
| Popular vote | 180,532 | 36,250 | 6,770 |
| Percentage | 8.63% | 1.731% | 0.32% |
| Swing | | ▲1.73 |
| | Seventh party | Eighth party | Ninth party |
| | | SFF |
| Leader | John Humphreys | Robert Borsak | Jim Saleam |
| Party | Liberal Democrats | SFF | Australia First |
| Last election | 1 | 0 | 0 |
| Seats before | 1 | 0 | 0 |
| Seats won | 1 | 2 | 0 |
| Seat change | Steady | ▲2 | Steady |
| Popular vote | 4,177 | 3,821 | 3,279 |
| Percentage | 0.20% | 0.18% | 0.16% |
| Swing | ▼0.04 |
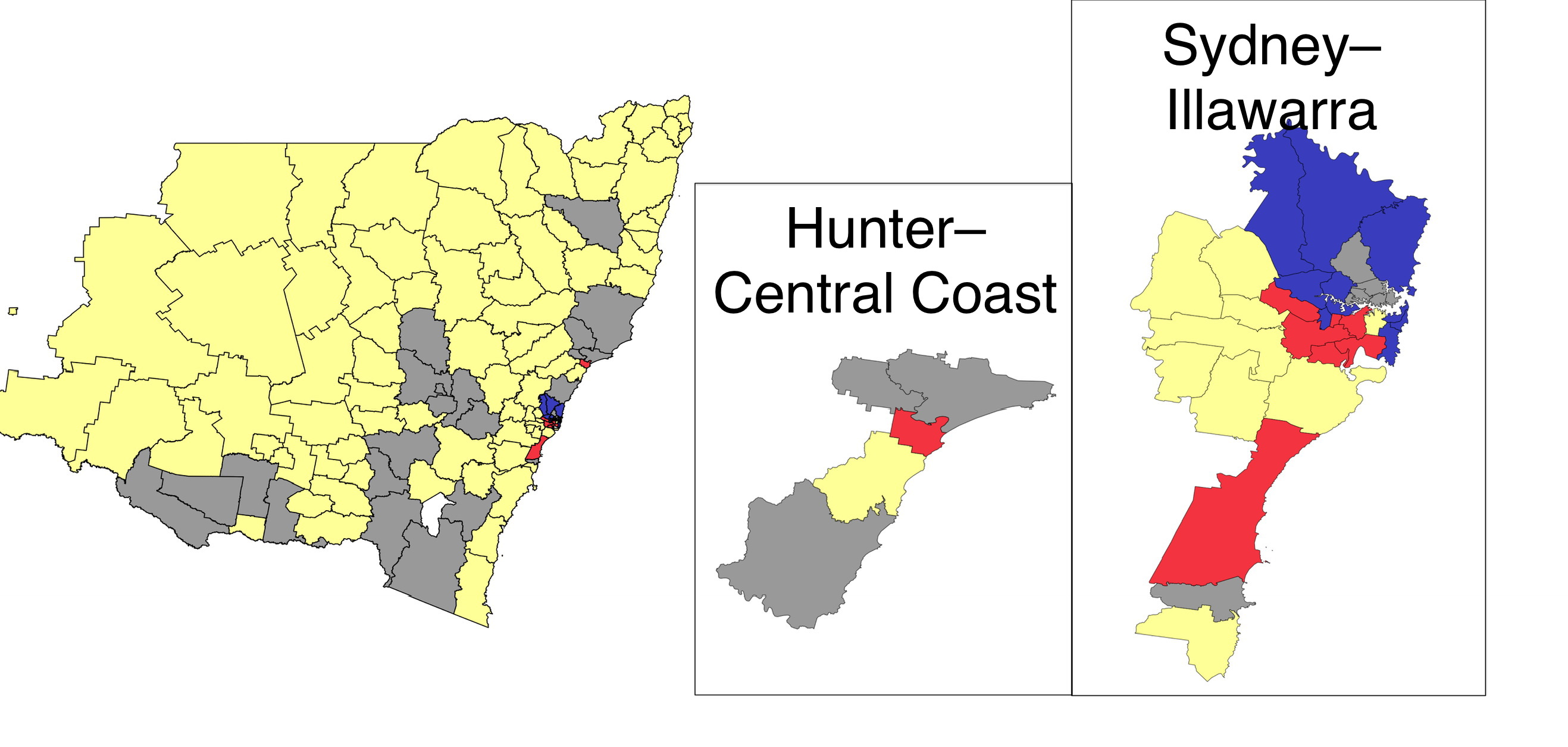
- Results by LGA

The 2017 New South Wales local elections were held on 9 September 2017 to elect the councils of 46 of the 128 local government areas (LGAs) in New South Wales. Several councils also held mayoral elections and/or referendums.

== Background ==
Following the 2012 elections, major changes occurred as a result of the enactment of the Local Government (Areas) Act 1948 and as a result of a review by the NSW Independent Pricing and Regulatory Tribunal (IPART) that commenced in 2013. On 12 May 2016, following a further review by the Minister for Local Government and the independent Local Government Boundaries Commission, Premier Mike Baird announced Stage 1 starting with 19 new councils, through amalgamations and mergers, with immediate effect. The Minister indicated in principle support to create a further nine new councils, subject to the decision of the courts. On the same day, the Governor of New South Wales acted on the advice of the Minister, and proclaimed the 19 new local government areas. Another proclamation occurred a few months later with the amalgamation of City of Botany Bay and City of Rockdale.

This resulted in 79 councils being contested in 2016 before the vast majority contested together again in 2021.

== Political parties ==
The following registered parties contested this election. This does not include groups of independents:

- Animal Justice Party
- Christian Democrats
- Greens
- Labor Party
- Liberal Democrats
- Liberal Party
- Shooters, Fishers and Farmers Party
- Socialist Alliance

In addition, a number of local government-registered parties also contested the elections.

== Party changes before elections ==
A number of councillors joined or left parties before the 2017 elections.

| Council | Ward | Councillor | Former party | New party | Date |
|---|---|---|---|---|---|
| Shellharbour | Unsubdivided | Paul Rankin | Liberal | Independent | 30 October 2013 |
| Strathfield | Unsubdivided | Nella Hall | Independent | Christian Democrats | 2015 |
| Ku-ring-gai | Gordon | Cheryl Szatow | Liberal | Independent | 19 September 2016 |
| Wollongong | Ward 3 | Bede Crasnich | Liberal | Independent | 26 August 2017 |
| Shellharbour | Unsubdivided | Kellie Marsh | Liberal | Independent | August 2017 |
| Ku-ring-gai | Comenarra | Jeff Pettett | Liberal Democrats | Independent | 2017 |

== Results ==
| Party | Votes | % | Swing | Seats | Change |
|---|---|---|---|---|---|
| Independents | 687,863 | 32.26 | | 241 | |
| Labor | 535,852 | 25.62 | | 105 | |
| Liberal | 533,377 | 25.50 | | 96 | |
| Greens | 180,532 | 8.63 | | 31 | |
| Your Northern Beaches | 40,828 | 1.95 | +1.95 | 6 | ▲6 |
| Our Local Community | 36,250 | 1.73 | +1.73 | 4 | ▲4 |
| Local Independent Party | 13,631 | 0.65 | | 0 | ▼2 |
| Good For Manly | 8,045 | 0.65 | +0.65 | 1 | ▲1 |
| Residents First Woollahra | 7,150 | 0.34 | +0.12 | 5 | Steady |
| Christian Democrats | 6,770 | 0.32 | | 0 | Steady |
| Serving Mosman | 5,402 | 0.26 | +0.14 | 3 | Steady |
| Liberal Democrats | 4,177 | 0.20 | | 1 | Steady |
| Residents For Mosman | 4,175 | 0.20 | +0.11 | 2 | ▲1 |
| Lorraine Wearne | 4,055 | 0.19 | –0.04 | 1 | ▼1 |
| Shooters, Fishers and Farmers | 3,821 | 0.18 | | 2 | |
| Independent Community Voice | 3,575 | 0.17 | | 1 | ▲1 |
| Kogarah Residents | 3,384 | 0.16 | +0.16 | 1 | ▲1 |
| Independent One Nation | 3,343 | 0.16 | +0.16 | 1 | ▲1 |
| Independent Christian Democrats | 3,298 | 0.16 | +0.16 | 1 | ▲1 |
| Australia First | 3,279 | 0.16 | | 0 | Steady |
| Residents Action Group | 3,158 | 0.15 | | 0 | ▼2 |
| Ben Shields Team | 2,650 | 0.13 | +0.13 | 1 | ▲1 |
| Communist | 1,595 | 0.07 | +0.00 | 0 | ▼1 |
| Strathfield Independents | 1,467 | 0.07 | +0.07 | 1 | ▲1 |
| Animal Justice | 804 | 0.04 | | 0 | Steady |
| Socialist Alliance | 407 | 0.02 | | 0 | Steady |
| Independent Greens | 236 | 0.01 | +0.01 | 0 | Steady |
| Total | 2,091,126 | 100.00 | – | – | – |
| Registered voters / turnout | 2,730,000 | 76.60 | | – | – |

=== Council totals ===
| Council | Seats | | | | |
| Council | Liberal | Labor | Greens | Independent | Others |
|---|---|---|---|---|---|
| Armidale | Did not contest | 1 | 1 | 9 | Did not contest |
| Bathurst | Did not contest | Did not contest | 1 | 8 | Did not contest |
| Bayside | 5 | 7 | 0 | 3 | Did not contest |
| Blayney | Did not contest | 1 | 0 | 6 | Did not contest |
| Burwood | 2 | 4 | Did not contest | 1 | Did not contest |
| Cabonne | Did not contest | Did not contest | Did not contest | 12 | Did not contest |
| Canada Bay | 3 | 4 | 1 | 1 | Did not contest |
| Canterbury-Bankstown | 5 | 9 | 1 | 0 | Did not contest |
| Central Coast | 4 | 6 | 0 | 5 | 0 |
| Cootamundra-Gundagai | Did not contest | Did not contest | Did not contest | 9 | Did not contest |
| Cumberland | 5 | 8 | 0 | 2 | Did not contest |
| Dubbo | Did not contest | 1 | Did not contest | 9 | Did not contest |
| Dungog | Did not contest | 1 | Did not contest | 8 | 0 |
| Edward River | Did not contest | Did not contest | Did not contest | 9 | Did not contest |
| Federation | Did not contest | Did not contest | Did not contest | 9 | Did not contest |
| Georges River | 5 | 6 | Did not contest | 4 | Did not contest |
| Hilltops | Did not contest | Did not contest | Did not contest | 11 | Did not contest |
| Hornsby | 5 | 2 | 2 | 1 | Did not contest |
| Hunter's Hill | 2 | Did not contest | Did not contest | 5 | Did not contest |
| Inner West | 2 | 5 | 5 | 3 | Did not contest |
| Ku-ring-gai | Did not contest | Did not contest | Did not contest | 9 | 1 (Note: Independent One Nation/Independent Greens ticket.) |
| Lane Cove | 3 | 1 | Did not contest | 5 | Did not contest |
| Maitland | 4 | 5 | 0 | 4 | Did not contest |
| Mid-Coast | 1 | 2 | Did not contest | 8 | Did not contest |
| Mosman | Did not contest | Did not contest | Did not contest | 7 | Did not contest |
| Murray River | Did not contest | Did not contest | Did not contest | 9 | Did not contest |
| Murrumbidgee | Did not contest | Did not contest | Did not contest | 9 | Did not contest |
| Newcastle | 1 | 7 | 1 | 4 | Did not contest |
| North Sydney | Did not contest | Did not contest | Did not contest | 9 | 1 (Note: One Liberal Democrat) |
| Northern Beaches | 5 | 0 | 2 | 8 | Did not contest |
| Oberon | Did not contest | Did not contest | Did not contest | 9 | Did not contest |
| Orange | Did not contest | Did not contest | 1 | 8 | 2 (Note: Two Shooters, Fishers, Farmers Party members.) |
| Parramatta | 6 | 5 | 1 | 3 | Did not contest |
| Port Stephens | Did not contest | 1 | Did not contest | 9 | Did not contest |
| Queanbeyan-Palerang | 1 | 2 | 1 | 7 | Did not contest |
| Randwick | 4 | 5 | 3 | 3 | 0 |
| Ryde | 4 | 4 | 2 | 2 | Did not contest |
| Shellharbour | 1 | 3 | Did not contest | 3 | Did not contest |
| Snowy Monaro | Did not contest | Did not contest | 1 | 10 | Did not contest |
| Snowy Valleys | Did not contest | Did not contest | Did not contest | 9 | Did not contest |
| Strathfield | 3 | 2 | Did not contest | 2 | Did not contest |
| The Hills | 9 | 3 | 0 | 0 | 0 |
| Waverley | 5 | 4 | 3 | 0 | Did not contest |
| Willoughby | Did not contest | Did not contest | 1 | 12 | Did not contest |
| Wollongong | 3 | 6 | 2 | 2 | Did not contest |
| Woollahra | 8 | 0 | 2 | 5 | Did not contest |

== Referendums and polls ==
In addition to the local elections, four LGAs held referendums on questions relating to electoral structures. Advisory polls were also held in Cumberland and Dungog.

=== Referendums ===
| LGA | Question | YES | | NO | | Turnout | | Ref |
| LGA | Question | Votes | % | Votes | % | Total formal | % | Ref |
|---|---|---|---|---|---|---|---|---|
| Cabonne | "Do you favour reducing councillor numbers from twelve (12) to nine (9)?" | 4,897 | 60.9 | 3,149 | 39.1 | 8,046 | 84.6 | |
| Dungog | "Dungog Shire Council currently has nine (9) Councillors with the Mayor elected by the Councillors. Do you approve of the popular election of the Mayor with seven (7) Councillors including the Mayor?" | 3,957 | 71.9 | 1,547 | 28.1 | 5,504 | 87.4 | |
| Dungog | "Do you approve of the abolition of wards?" | 2,302 | 45.9 | 2,712 | 54.1 | 5,014 | 87.4 | |
| North Sydney | "Do you favour election of the Mayor by Councillors for a term of two years?" | 17,271 | 52.4 | 15,671 | 47.6 | 32,942 | 72.6 | |
| Shellharbour | "The Mayor of City of Shellharbour Council is currently elected annually by the seven (7) Councillors. Do you favour the election of the Mayor by the voters of City of Shellharbour for a four year term which necessitates an increase in the number of Councillors by one (1)? This will result in a total of nine (9) elected representatives made up of one (1) Mayor and eight (8) Councillors." | 27,211 | 70.1 | 11,586 | 29.9 | 38,797 | 84.1 | |
| Shellharbour | "Currently the City of Shellharbour Local Government Area has no Ward structure. Do you favour the City of Shellharbour Local Government Area being comprised of Wards?" | 18,038 | 50.3 | 17,792 | 49.7 | 35,830 | 84.1 | |

=== Polls ===
| LGA | Question | YES | | NO | | Turnout | | Ref |
| LGA | Question | Votes | % | Votes | % | Total formal | % | Ref |
|---|---|---|---|---|---|---|---|---|
| Cumberland | "Cumberland Council currently operates five public swimming pools in the Local Government Area. Each year the five pools expect to cater for a total of approximately 405,000 visitors. In 2018 it is estimated that the total operating costs of all five pools will exceed revenues by almost $2.15 million (which is 2.4% of Council’s rates income), and it is expected that the shortfall will increase in subsequent years. Council subsidises these pools by using other funding sources, such as rates to cover the shortfall. Do you support Council continuing to operate and subsidise all of these swimming pools?" | 65,745 | 74.8 | 22,137 | 25.2 | 87,882 | 76.5 | |
| Dungog | "Do you want Dungog Shire Council to remain a stand alone Council?" | 2,492 | 47.1 | 2,795 | 52.9 | 5,287 | 87.4 | |
| Dungog | "Do you want Dungog Shire Council to begin merger discussions with Maitland City Council?" | 1,152 | 23.2 | 3,821 | 76.8 | 4,973 | 87.5 | |
| Dungog | "Do you want Dungog Shire Council to begin merger discussions with Port Stephens Council?" | 2,908 | 55.4 | 2,339 | 44.6 | 5,247 | 87.4 | |
| Dungog | "Do you want Dungog Shire Council to apply to the Boundaries Commission to be abolished and have the Shire area divided and joined with neighbouring local government areas?" | 1,443 | 29.4 | 3,469 | 70.6 | 4,912 | 87.4 | |

== Aftermath ==
=== Party defections ===
In 2019, Labor Cumberland councillor Steve Christou defected to Our Local Community, as did directly-elected Canada Bay mayor Angelo Tsirekas in 2021. OLC councillor Andrew Wilson joined The Small Business Party in 2021.

== By-elections ==
The New South Wales Electoral Commission held a number of by-elections to fill vacancies on councils following the 2017 elections up until 2021.

The Central Coast Council was suspended before two by-elections in 2020 could be held.

| Council | Ward | Before | | Change | | Result after preference distribution | | | |
| Council | Ward | Councillor | Party | Cause | Date | Date | Party | Candidate | % |
|---|---|---|---|---|---|---|---|---|---|
| Murrumbidgee | East | | | | | 10 March 2018 | Independent | Pat Brown | 52.47 |
| Murrumbidgee | East | | | | | 10 March 2018 | Independent | Shane Fraser | 47.53 |
| The Hills | West | | | | | 28 July 2018 | Liberal | Jacob Jackson | 69.01 |
| The Hills | West | | | | | 28 July 2018 | Labor | Immanuel Selvaraj | 30.99 |
| Ku-ring-gai | St Ives | David Citer | Independent Liberal | Resignation | 2 August 2018 | 27 October 2018 | Ind. Liberal | Christine Kay | 53.92 |
| Ku-ring-gai | St Ives | David Citer | Independent Liberal | Resignation | 2 August 2018 | 27 October 2018 | Independent | Nicholas Bakker | 46.08 |
| Wollongong | Ward 3 | | | | | 24 November 2018 | Labor | Ann Martin | 58.36 |
| Wollongong | Ward 3 | | | | | 24 November 2018 | Independent | Ami Beck (Note: Second-placed out of three candidate after initial preference distribution.) | 21.67 |
| Wollongong | Ward 3 | Vicky King | Labor | Death | 25 February 2020 | No by-election held due to COVID-19 pandemic | | | |
| Central Coast | Gosford East | Rebecca Gale | Liberal | Resignation | 26 October 2020 | Council suspended before countback | | | |
| Central Coast | Gosford West | Troy Marquart | Liberal | Resignation | 26 October 2020 | Council suspended before countback | | | |
