= Better Australia =

Political lobbying group in Australia

- Formation: 2024; 2 years ago
- Dissolved: 2025
- Purpose: Anti-Greens and anti-teal campaigning
- Headquarters: Sydney, Australia
- Website: www.betteraustralia.org

Better Australia was an Australian political advocacy group established in the lead-up to the 2025 Australian federal election to campaign against teal independents and the Australian Greens.

== History ==
The group was first formed as Better Council in 2024. The group campaigned in the 2024 New South Wales local elections, opposing the pro-Palestine stances taken by Greens councillors. Group spokesperson Sophie Calland, a member of the Labor Party, argued that local politicians should focus on their own communities, rather than spending "valuable time and resources" debating "international issues like Gaza".

Better Australia was accused of being pro-Israel lobbyists interfering in Australian local elections, with ties between organisers and Israel being questioned. Its organisation has been described as "opaque" by the Australian Financial Review,

=== 2024 local elections ===
Better Council focused their efforts on three council areas in Sydney's Eastern Suburbs, — Woollahra, Waverley and Randwick. The Greens lost three seats in these municipalities. (Note: Central Ward in Randwick, Lawson Ward in Waverley, and Cooper Ward in Woollahra)

=== 2025 federal election ===
Rebranding as Better Australia, the group began campaigning in the months before the 2025 federal election, with ad tracking data showed Better Australia spent $373,209 on social media advertising from March 28 to May 3 of 2025.

Spokesperson Sophie Calland told the Guardian that Better Australia’s campaign is non-partisan, and that "[w]e are not advocating for a particular major party but against the Greens, teals and other minor party candidates across the country." Journalist Wendy Bacon claimed that the group was receiving campaigning advice from former Liberal staffers and strategists, while Calland herself is a registered member of the Labor Party.

Better Australia ran an extensive campaign against teal candidates, focusing on Wentworth in Sydney and Goldstein in Melbourne, as well as targeting Greens-held seats including Brisbane and Melbourne. Teal Zoe Daniel lost re-election, as did three of the four sitting Greens MPs, including party leader Adam Bandt. The group claimed responsibility for the results, saying that their ads were seen over 43 million times in 13 target 13 seats.

Better Australia representatives wearing yellow vests similar to those worn by election workers showed up at polling places prior to and on election day 2025. They were reported to the Australian Electoral Commission due to the resemblance between the yellow vests worn by the group's volunteers while handing out anti-teal pamphlets in the independent-held seat of Kooyong, and the official yellow vests worn by election workers. However, the AEC determined that because the group's vests feature a Better Australia logo, no rules were broken. Rachel Dexter, a journalist writing for the Sydney Morning Herald, suggested that Better Australia's vest design was an attempt to confuse voters.
