= Our Local Community =

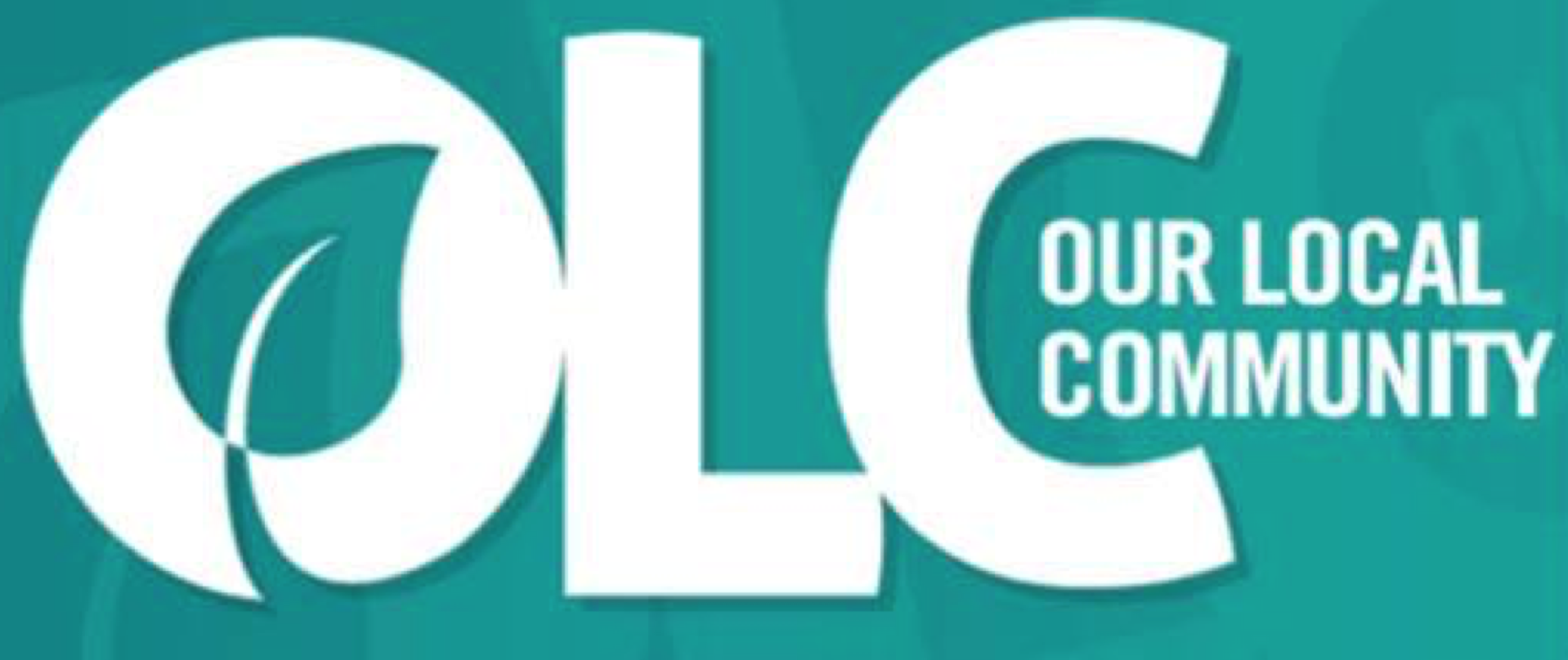
- Abbreviation: OLC
- Leader: Paul Garrard
- Founder: Paul Garrard
- Founded: November 2013; 13 years ago
- Registered: c. 2017; 9 years ago
- Preceded by: Woodville Independents
- Headquarters: 42 O'Neill Street; Granville, New South Wales
- Membership (2024): 450
- Ideology: Conservatism; Localism
- Political position: Centre-right to right-wing
- Colours: Teal and orange
- Slogan: Caring. Consulting. Understanding.
- Cumberland City Council: 2 / 15
- Liverpool City Council: 1 / 11
- Canterbury Bankstown City Council: 1 / 15

Our Local Community (OLC) is an Australian political party that competes in local elections in New South Wales. The party was formed in 2013 by former Parramatta mayor Paul Garrard, and is currently registered with the New South Wales Electoral Commission (NSWEC).

Unlike many other local government political parties in Australia, OLC competes in and has members on several different councils.

As of July 2026, there are zero OLC councillors on Parramatta City Council, three on Cumberland City Council, one on Liverpool City Council and one on Canterbury Bankstown City Council.

== History ==
OLC founder and then-Parramatta councillor Paul Garrad was a member of the Labor Party until 2004 when he was not preselected to run for the state electorate of Granville. He was re-elected to council at the 2012 local elections after forming Woodville Independents.

In 2013, Garrard founded OLC, which had around 300 members in its first year.

=== 2017 elections ===
In 2017, OLC won two seats in Cumberland and two seats in Parramatta. The party also contested Canterbury-Bankstown.

Cumberland Labor councillor Steve Christou defected to OLC in 2019, as did directly elected Labor mayor of Canada Bay Angelo Tsirekas in October 2021.

OLC councillor Andrew Wilson joined The Small Business Party in 2021.

=== 2021 elections ===
At the 2021 local elections, the party won an additional 3 seats in Canada Bay, and contested Fairfield and Randwick for the first time. An additional two seats (including Steve Christou) in both Cumberland and Parramatta were also gained.

On 13 December 2023, Tsirekas was dismissed mayor of Canada Bay by Minister for Local Government Ron Hoenig after an investigation from the Independent Commission Against Corruption (ICAC) over allegations he accepted benefits from a developer group in return for "favourable planning decisions".

Cumberland councillor Eddy Sarkis left OLC after losing party preselection in February 2024.

=== Cumberland book ban ===
In May 2024, OLC's councillors in Cumberland were involved in a controversial ban of same-sex parenting books from the eight libraries in the Cumberland public library system.

During a council meeting on 1 May, Christou requested that the motion "That Council adopt the 'Library Strategy 2024 - 2027' as outlined in Attachment 1 of this report" be amended with "subject to the following being undertaken: That Council take immediate action to rid same-sex parents books/materials in Council's library service". The ban was passed with the support of the two other OLC councillors, Paul Garrard and Helen Hughes.

On 15 May, the ban was repealed with Garrard and Hughes voting against it, while Christou continued to support it.

=== 2024 elections ===
By the 2024 local elections, OLC held three seats in Cumberland, four seats in Parramatta and two in Canada Bay following the previous years resignation of Eddy Sarkis (Cumberland) and sacking of Mayor Angelo Tsirekas (Canada Bay).

They sought re-election in Cumberland and Parramatta, as well as contested Canterbury-Bankstown, Liverpool and several rural areas.

The party had pledged to ban Welcome to Country and smoking ceremonies if elected to a majority in Cumberland.

In the 2024 local elections, OLC won one seat in Canterbury Bankstown and Liverpool whilst keeping it's number of Cumberland councillors at three. However, the party lost all four seats it held in Parramatta and its remaining seat in Canada Bay.

== State and federal politics ==
Although the party is registered for local elections in New South Wales, it is not registered for state elections or with the Australian Electoral Commission for federal elections. However, a number of OLC members have contested elections as independents.

Michelle Garrard achieved 4% of the vote in Parramatta at the 2019 state election, running on behalf of the party. Christou ran in Parramatta at the 2022 federal election. He had 3.5% of the vote.

In May 2024, Paul Garrard said the potential for OLC to run candidates in state elections "has been discussed" but the party "is not there yet".

== Ideology and ideals ==
Paul Garrard has described OLC as "centre-right" and Christou has described it as "right-wing conservative".

The party's stated aims are to "encourage participation by the community in a wide range of activities and services, to improve local infrastructure in the best interests of residents and the wider community and endeavour to provide an active voice in addressing various social issues".

== Election results ==
=== Council-by-council ===
Year	Council	Seats		Votes		
Year	Council	Seats won	±	Total	%	±%
2017	Canterbury Bankstown	0 / 15	Steady	16,440	10.1	▲10.1
2017	Cumberland	2 / 15	▲2	12,820	14.3	▲14.3
2017	Parramatta	2 / 15	▲2	6,990	7.1	▲7.1
2021	Canada Bay	2 / 15	Steady	12,867	27.1	▲27.1
2021	Cumberland	2 / 8	▲2	12,820	28.3	▲14.0
2021	Fairfield	0 / 9	Steady	2,880	3.1	▲3.1
2021	Parramatta	4 / 15	▲2	21,476	19.4	▲12.3
2021	Randwick	0 / 15	Steady	3,067	4.5	▲4.5
2024	Cumberland	3 / 15	Steady	15,001	15.2	▼13.1
2024	Canterbury Bankstown	1 / 15	▲1	6,308	3.6	▲3.6
2024	Liverpool	1 / 15	▲1	9,563	8.6	▲8.6
2024	Parramatta	0 / 15	▼4	11,902	10.2	▼9.2

=== Mayoral ===
Year	Council	Candidate	Votes			Result
Year	Council	Candidate	Total	%	±%	Result
2021	Canada Bay	Angelo Tsirekas	18,014	37.1	▲37.1	Won
