= Cumberland City Council =

- Local government area
- Location in Metropolitan Sydney

- Interactive map of Cumberland City Council
- Country: Australia
- State: New South Wales
- Region: Greater Western Sydney
- Established: 12 May 2016
- Council seat: Administration Centre, Merrylands

Government
  - Mayor: Joseph Rahme (Liberal)
  - State electorates: Auburn; Fairfield; Granville; Prospect
  - Federal division: *Blaxland; Fowler; McMahon; Parramatta; Reid

Area
  - Total: 72 km^{2} (28 sq mi)

Population
  - Total: 235,439 (2021 census)
  - Density: 3,270/km^{2} (8,470/sq mi)
- Website: Cumberland City Council
LGAs around Cumberland City Council
| Blacktown | Parramatta | Parramatta |
| Blacktown | Cumberland City Council | Strathfield |
| Fairfield | Canterbury Bankstown | Canterbury Bankstown |

Cumberland Council, trading as Cumberland City Council, is a local government area located in the western suburbs of Sydney in the state of New South Wales, Australia. The council was formed on 12 May 2016 from the merger of parts of the Cities of Auburn, Parramatta (Woodville Ward), and Holroyd.

The council comprises an area of 72 square kilometres (28 sq mi) and as of the 2021 census had a population of 235,439.

The first Special Meeting of Cumberland Council was held on 19 May 2016 at the Granville Town Hall, and the council currently meets at the Merrylands Administration Centre.

The current mayor is Joseph Rahme of the Liberal Party, elected on 30 September 2026.

== Suburbs and localities in the local government area ==
Suburbs in the Cumberland City Council area are:

- Auburn
- Berala
- Chester Hill (minor part; majority in City of Canterbury Bankstown)
- Fairfield (shared with Fairfield)
- Girraween
- Granville (shared with Parramatta)
- Greystanes
- Guildford
- Guildford West
- Holroyd (shared with Parramatta)
- Homebush West (minor part; majority in Strathfield)
- Lidcombe (shared with Parramatta)
- Mays Hill (shared with Parramatta)
- Merrylands
- Merrylands West
- Pemulwuy
- Pendle Hill (shared with Parramatta)
- Prospect (shared with Blacktown)
- Regents Park
- Rookwood
- Smithfield (shared with Fairfield)
- South Granville
- South Wentworthville
- Toongabbie (shared with Blacktown and Parramatta)
- Wentworthville (shared with Parramatta)
- Westmead (shared with Parramatta)
- Woodpark
- Yennora (shared with Fairfield)

== History ==
=== Holroyd Council ===
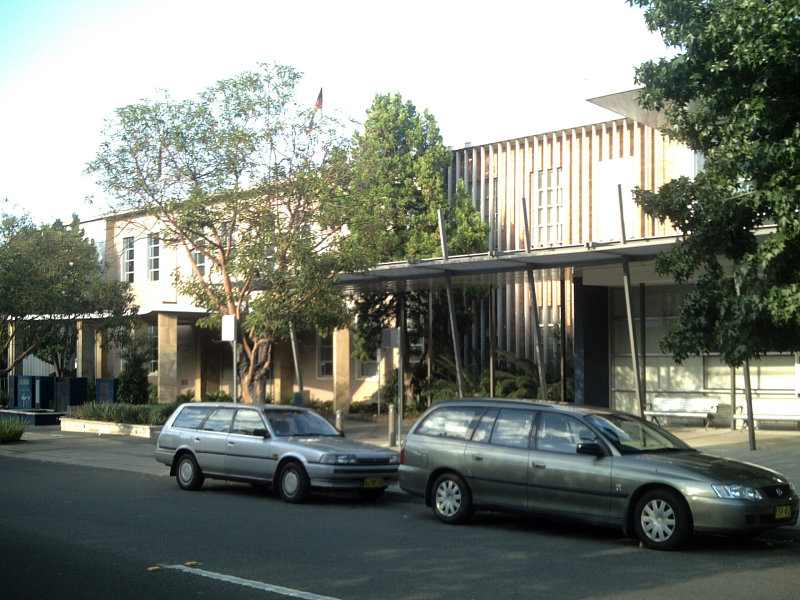
The Holroyd Administration Centre in Merrylands, now the Cumberland Council seat, was the Holroyd seat from 1962.

The area formerly known as the City of Holroyd was first proclaimed in July 1872 as the "Municipal District of Prospect and Sherwood", which became the "Municipality of Prospect and Sherwood" from 1906 and on 11 January 1927 it was renamed the "Municipality of Holroyd" after Arthur Holroyd, the first mayor. From 1 January 1991, city status was granted, becoming the City of Holroyd. Originally located at the Council Chambers in Merrylands West from 1915, the administrative centre of Holroyd was located in the suburb of Merrylands from 1962.

=== Auburn Council ===
The opening of the second Auburn Town Hall, Auburn Road, 12 July 1927.

To the east of Holroyd, the City of Auburn was first proclaimed on 19 February 1892 as the "Borough of Auburn" and became the "Municipality of Auburn" in 1906. On 20 June 1906, the hitherto unincorporated area around Silverwater and Newington was combined into the Municipality of Auburn.

The eastern section of Auburn was originally proclaimed as the Borough of Rookwood on 8 December 1891 and in 1913 Rookwood was renamed "Lidcombe", a portmanteau of the names of the two previous mayors, in an attempt to distance the municipality from the necropolis. On 1 January 1949, with the passing of the Local Government (Areas) Act 1948, the Municipalities of Auburn and Lidcombe were amalgamated to form the new "Municipality of Auburn". In 1993 Auburn Municipal Council became "Auburn Council" and was granted city status in 2008, becoming the "Auburn City Council".

=== Woodville Ward ===
The area known as the Woodville Ward of the City of Parramatta until the amalgamations in May 2016, was first incorporated as the "Borough of Granville" on 20 January 1885, which became the "Municipality of Granville" from 1906, and met in the Granville Town Hall when it was completed in 1888.

On 1 January 1949, with the passing of the Local Government (Areas) Act 1948, the municipalities of Granville, Dundas, Ermington and Rydalmere, and Parramatta were amalgamated to form the new "City of Parramatta". Granville municipality became the "Granville Ward" and the council meetings of the new Parramatta City were held at the Granville Town Hall from 1949 until the new administration centre was opened in Parramatta in 1958. In 1995 a reorganization of Parramatta's wards resulted in Granville Ward being renamed "Woodville Ward" after Woodville Road while the former Granville Municipality suburbs of Harris Park, Rosehill, Telopea, and northern sections of Granville and Clyde, were moved into the Elizabeth Macarthur Ward.

=== Establishment of Cumberland Council ===
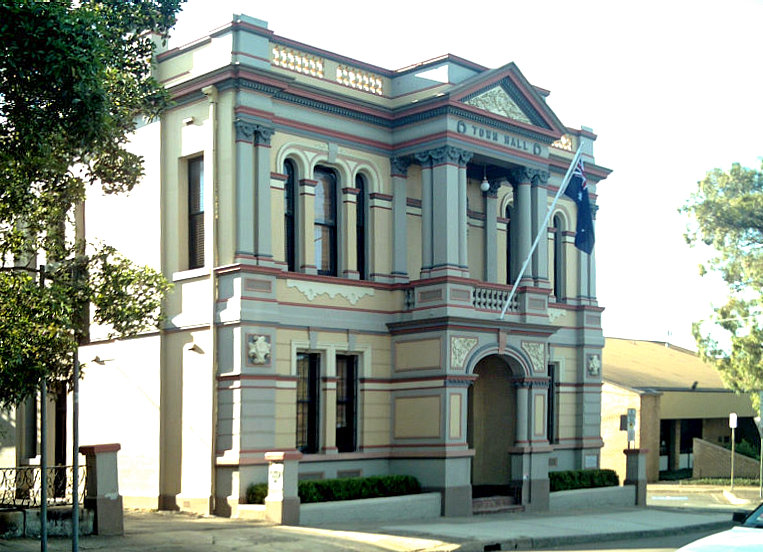
Granville Town Hall was the location of the first meeting of Cumberland Council on 19 May 2016.

A 2015 review of local government boundaries by the NSW Government Independent Pricing and Regulatory Tribunal recommended a major reorganisation for the area covered by Auburn, Holroyd and Parramatta councils. The government considered two proposals. The first was a merger of parts of Auburn, Holroyd and Parramatta to form a new council with an area of 72 square kilometres (28 sq mi) and support a population of approximately 219,000. The second proposed a merger of parts of Parramatta, Auburn, The Hills, Hornsby, and Holroyd to form a new council with an area of 82 square kilometres (32 sq mi) and support a population of approximately 215,725.

On 12 May 2016, Cumberland Council was proclaimed as a new local government area, combining parts of Auburn City Council (south of the M4 Western Motorway), the Woodville Ward of the Parramatta City Council, and the majority of the Holroyd City Council. The remainder of the Auburn City Council area north of the M4 Western Motorway (including parts of the Sydney Olympic Park) and a small section of Holroyd was merged into the reconstituted City of Parramatta Council.

Cumberland Council logo used from May 2016 to February 2017.

The former general manager of Mosman Council (1986–2013), Viv May PSM, who had been serving as the Administrator of the suspended Auburn City Council since February 2016, was appointed as the Administrator, and the long-serving Holroyd General Manager, Merv Ismay, was appointed as interim general manager. The first Special Meeting of Cumberland Council was held on 19 May 2016, at the Granville Town Hall, the historic former seat of the Granville Municipality, which merged with Parramatta in 1949. Subsequent Council meetings alternated between the Merrylands Administration Building and Auburn Civic Centre, until December 2016 when May decided that the Auburn council chambers would be taken over by the Auburn Library, and all council meetings from then to be held at Merrylands.

After undertaking a significant amount of work to rationalize council services and staff, noting that "Auburn had issues with flagrant rezoning, and Holroyd was over-promising and underdelivering, living in a financial fantasy with many of its projects", May's term as Administrator came to an end in September 2017, with the election of the first council. The former mayor of Holroyd, Greg Cummings, was elected as the inaugural Mayor of Cumberland Council on 27 September 2017.

=== "City" trading name ===
On 18 December 2019, the mayor Steve Christou presented a mayoral minute to council recommending that Cumberland Council begin trading as "Cumberland City Council", by changing the council's trading name and business registration. The motion was passed 7–7 with the casting vote of the mayor, and the name change to "Cumberland City Council" was implemented from January 2020. However, this did not legally confer city status on the council as it had merely changed the trading name of the council, the legal name as proclaimed in 2016 remains "Cumberland Council", which can only be changed by official proclamation of the Governor in the NSW Government Gazette under section 206 of the Local Government Act 1993. On 6 September 2023, the council voted unanimously to write to the Minister for Local Government, requesting that the Council area be formally proclaimed as "Cumberland City" under section 206 of the Local Government Act, and the Council be renamed "Cumberland City Council" under section 207 of the Act.

== Heritage listings ==
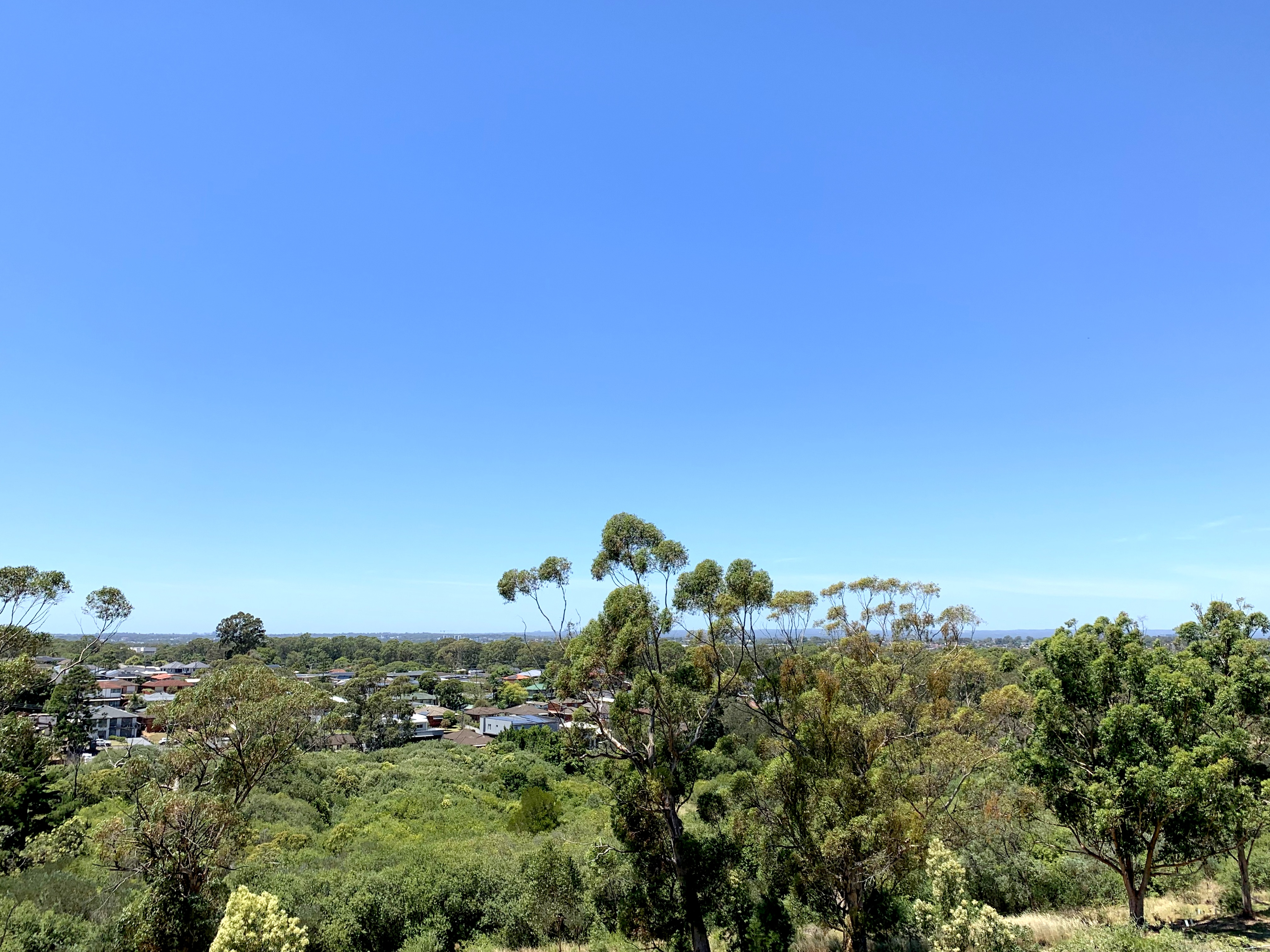
View of Greystanes area from Prospect Hill

The Cumberland Council area has a number of heritage-listed sites, including:

- Greystanes, Lower Prospect Canal Reserve
- Guildford, 11–35 Byron Road: Linnwood, Guildford
- Guildford, Frank Street: Guildford West pipehead and water supply canal
- Prospect, Clunies Ross Street: Prospect Hill
- Westmead, 2, 4, 6, and 8 Bridge Road: Essington

== Demographics ==
Selected historical census data for Cumberland local government area
| Census year | | 2016 | 2021 |
|---|---|---|---|
| Population | Population on census night | 216,079 | ▲235,439 |
| Population | LGA rank in terms of size within New South Wales | 7th | ▲6th |
| Population | % of New South Wales population | 2.89% | ▲2.92% |
| Population | % of Australian population | 0.92% | 0.92% |
| Median weekly incomes | | | |
| Personal income | Median weekly personal income | A$501 | ▲ A$654 |
| Personal income | % of Australian median income | 75.7% | ▲81.2% |
| Family income | Median weekly family income | A$1,436 | ▲ A$1,808 |
| Family income | % of Australian median income | 82.8% | ▲85.3% |
| Household income | Median weekly household income | A$1,379 | ▲ A$1,678 |
| Household income | % of Australian median income | 95.9% | ▲96.1% |
| Dwelling structure | | | |
| Dwelling type | Separate house | 56.0% | ▼52.0% |
| Dwelling type | Semi-detached, terrace or townhouse | 16.2% | ▼15.1% |
| Dwelling type | Flat or apartment | 26.8% | ▲32.4% |

Selected historical census data for Cumberland local government area
Ancestry, top responses
| 2016 | | 2021 | |
|---|---|---|---|
| Lebanese | 11.3% | Chinese | ▲12.6% |
| Chinese | 10.8% | Lebanese | ▲11.9% |
| Australian | 10.1% | Australian | ▲10.6% |
| English | 8.8% | English | ▲9.2% |
| Indian | 7.1% | Indian | ▲8.7% |
Country of birth, top responses
| 2016 | | 2021 | |
| Australia | 41.7% | Australia | ▼39.7% |
| India | 6.6% | India | ▲8.5% |
| China | 6.5% | China | ▲6.6% |
| Lebanon | 4.9% | Lebanon | ▼4.8% |
| Afghanistan | 2.8% | Nepal | ▲4.3% |
| Nepal | 2.3% | Afghanistan | ▼2.6% |
Language, top responses (other than English)
| 2016 | | 2021 | |
| Arabic | 15.2% | Arabic | ▼14.1% |
| Mandarin | 6.3% | Mandarin | ▲6.7% |
| Cantonese | 4.5% | Nepali | ▲4.4% |
| Tamil | 3.1% | Cantonese | ▼4.0% |
| Turkish | 3.1% | Tamil | ▲3.3% |
Religious affiliation, top responses
| 2016 | | 2021 | |
| Catholic | 24.0% | Islam | ▲22.8% |
| Islam | 21.9% | Catholic | ▼21.3% |
| No Religion | 13.8% | No Religion | ▲14.7% |
| Hinduism | 10.2% | Hinduism | ▲13.4% |
| Not stated | 8.2% | Not stated | ▲8.5% |

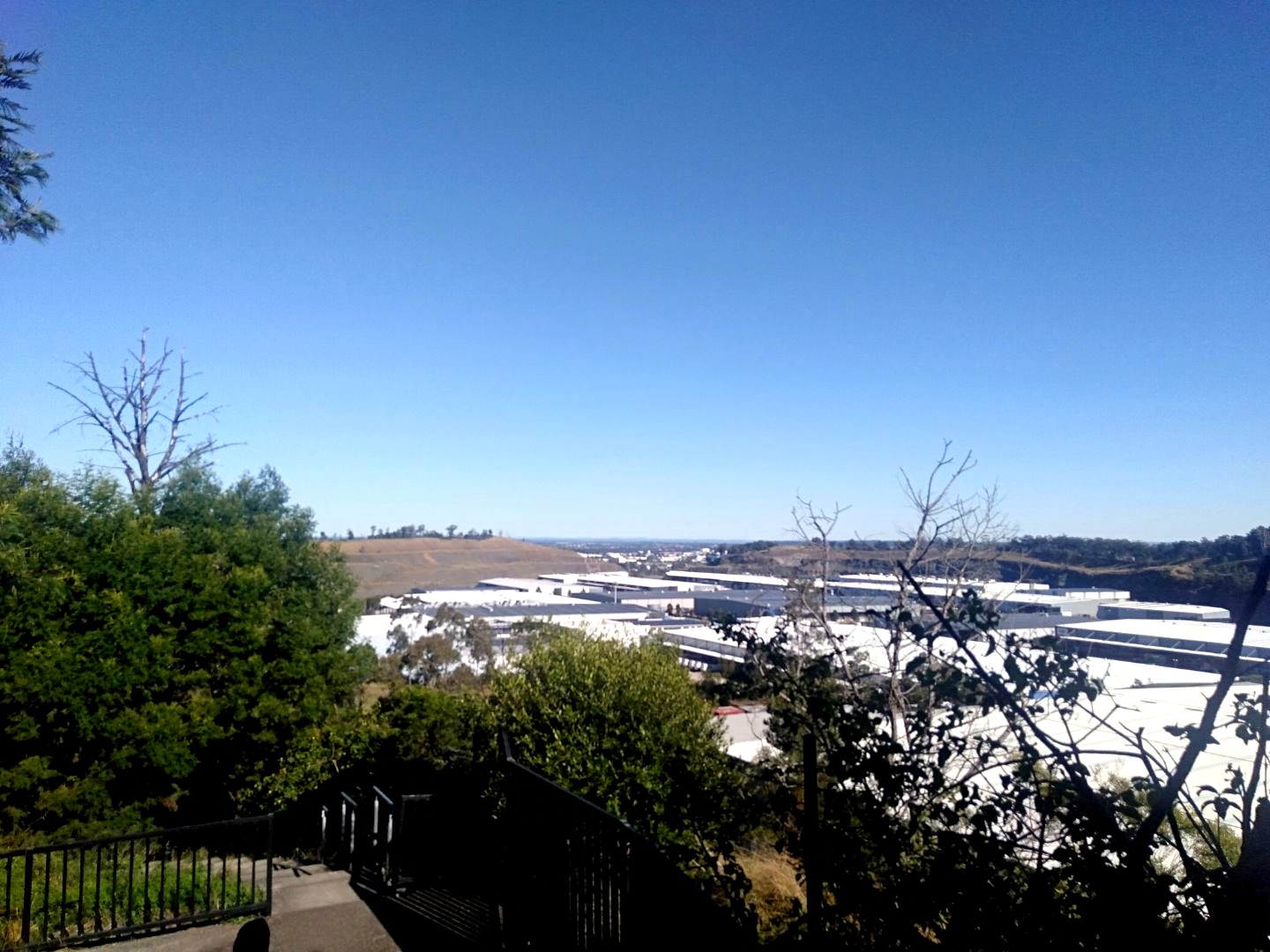
Greystanes/Pemulwuy industrial area, which was formerly a quarry zone.

== Facilities ==
There are eight libraries located throughout the local government area. There are also five council-run swimming pools. On 9 September 2017 a poll put to the residents by council asked for their views on continuing to run all five pools, given that their operating costs took up 2% of council revenue. The poll returned a result of 74% in favour of continuing council operation of all the pools.

Located partially in the region, the Smithfield-Wetherill Park Industrial Estate is the largest industrial estate in the southern hemisphere and is the centre of manufacturing and distribution in western Sydney, with more than 1,000 manufacturing, wholesale, transport and service firms. All general waste is transported to the Clyde waste transfer station before being transferred to Veolia's Whytes Gully Waste and Resource Recovery Centre at Kembla Grange, south of Wollongong.

== Council ==
Cumberland City Council

Leadership
- Mayor: Joseph Rahme (Liberal)
- Deputy Mayor: Michael Zaiter (Liberal)

Structure
- Seats: 15 councillors
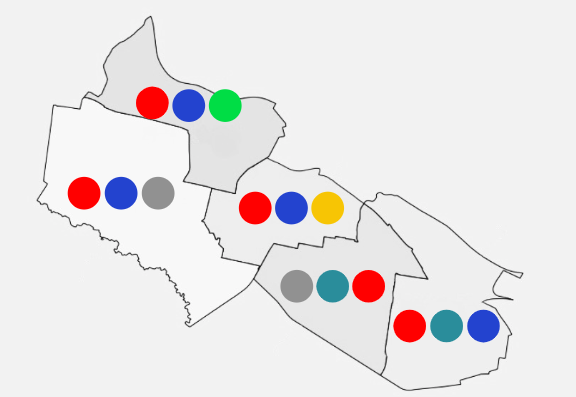
- Map of elected councillors by party in each of the 5 wards
- Political groups: Labor (5) Liberal (4) Our Local Community (2) Independent (2) Greens (1); Libertarian (1)

Elections
- Voting system: Single transferable vote
- Last election: 14 September 2024
- Next election: 16 September 2028

Cumberland City Council comprises fifteen councillors elected proportionally, with three councillors elected in five wards. On 9 September 2017 the first council was elected. The mayor is elected bi-annually and deputy mayor annually by the councillors at the first meeting of the council.

=== Current composition ===
The most recent election was held on 14 September 2024. Steve Christou left OLC in December 2024, the makeup of the council, is as follows:

| Ward | Councillor | Party | Notes |
|---|---|---|---|
| Granville Ward | Ola Hamed | Labor | Elected 2017; Deputy Mayor 2023–2024; Mayor 2024–2026. |
| Granville Ward | Joseph Rahme | Liberal | Elected 2017 Mayor 2026–present. |
| Granville Ward | Steve Christou | Libertarian | Elected 2017; Mayor 2019–2022; Labor until 2019; Our Local Community 2019–2024; Libertarian 2024–present. |
| Greystanes Ward | Diane Colman | Labor | Elected 2021 |
| Greystanes Ward | Nadima Kafrouni-Saba | Liberal | Elected 2024 |
| Greystanes Ward | Eddy Sarkis | Independent | Elected 2017; Deputy Mayor 2017–2018, 2019–2021; left Our Local Community in February 2024 |
| Regents Park Ward | Enver Yasar | Labor | Elected 2024 |
| Regents Park Ward | Steve Yang | Liberal | Elected 2024 |
| Regents Park Ward | Helen Hughes | Our Local Community | Elected 2021 |
| South Granville Ward | Glenn Elmore | Labor | Elected 2017; Deputy Mayor 2018–2019. |
| South Granville Ward | Paul Garrard | Our Local Community | Elected 2017 |
| South Granville Ward | Ahmed Ouf | Independent | Elected 2024 |
| Wentworthville Ward | Michael Zaiter | Liberal | Elected 2017; Deputy Mayor 2021–2022, 2024–present |
| Wentworthville Ward | Suman Saha | Labor | Elected 2017; Deputy Mayor 2022–2023. |
| Wentworthville Ward | Sujan Selventhiran | Greens | Elected 2024 |

=== Officeholders ===
| Mayor | Term | Notes |
|---|---|---|
| Viv May PSM (Administrator) | 12 May 2016 – 27 September 2017 | Town Clerk/General Manager of Mosman 1986–2013, Administrator of Auburn 2016 |
| Greg Cummings (ALP/IND) | 27 September 2017 – 25 September 2019 | Mayor of Holroyd 2008–2009, 2014–2016 |
| Steve Christou (OLC) | 25 September 2019 – 12 January 2022 | |
| Lisa Lake (ALP) | 12 January 2022 – 14 September 2024 | |
| Ola Hamed (ALP) | 16 October 2024 – 30 September 2026 | |
| Joseph Rahme (LIB) | 30 September 2026 – present | |
| Deputy Mayor | Term | Notes |
| Eddy Sarkis (OLC) | 27 September 2017 – 26 September 2018 | Deputy Mayor of Holroyd 2005–2007 |
| Glenn Elmore (ALP) | 26 September 2018 – 25 September 2019 | |
| Eddy Sarkis (OLC) | 25 September 2019 – 30 September 2021 | |
| Michael Zaiter (LIB) | 30 September 2021 – 12 January 2022 | |
| Kun Huang (ALP) | 12 January 2022 – 28 September 2022 | |
| Suman Saha (ALP) | 28 September 2022 – 27 September 2023 | |
| Ola Hamed (ALP) | 27 September 2023 – 14 September 2024 | |
| Michael Zaiter (LIB) | 16 October 2024 – present | |
| General Manager | Term | Notes |
| Merv Ismay | 12 May 2016 – 2 June 2016 | General Manager of Holroyd 2007–2016 |
| Malcolm Ryan | 2 June 2016 – 22 November 2017 | |
| Hamish McNulty | 22 November 2017 – 22 April 2021 | Acting until July 2018 |
| Peter Fitzgerald | 22 April 2021 – present | Acting until 12 July 2021. |

== Election results ==
=== 2024 ===
2024 Cumberland City Council election: Ward results
| Party | Votes | % | Swing | Seats | Change |
|---|---|---|---|---|---|
| Labor | 31,340 | 31.7 | −16.9 | 5 | ▼3 |
| Liberal | 23,959 | 24.2 | +11.4 (Note: Compared with Independent Liberals in 2021.) | 4 | ▲2 |
| Our Local Community | 15,001 | 15.2 | −13.1 | 3 | ▼1 |
| Independents | 10,922 | 11.0 | +10.0 | 1 | ▲1 |
| People Not Party Politics | 8,044 | 8.1 | +8.1 | 1 | ▲1 |
| Greens | 3,952 | 4.0 | +1.2 | 1 | ▲1 |
| The Independents | 3,903 | 3.9 | −2.6 | 0 | ▼1 |
| Battler | 1,848 | 1.9 | +1.9 | 0 | Steady |
| Formal votes | 98,969 | 91.3 | | | |
| Informal votes | 9,368 | 8.7 | | | |
| Total | 108,337 | 100.0 | | 15 | |
| Registered voters / turnout | 133,113 | 81.4 | | | |

=== 2021 ===
2021 New South Wales local elections: Cumberland
| Party | Votes | % | Swing | Seats | Change |
|---|---|---|---|---|---|
| Labor | 47,343 | 48.6 | +9.4 | 8 | Steady |
| Our Local Community | 27,547 | 28.3 | +14.0 | 4 | ▲2 |
| Independent Liberal | 12,467 | 12.8 | −13.4 (Note: Compared with the Liberal Party result at the 2017 election.) | 2 | ▼3 |
| The Independents | 6,388 | 6.5 | +6.5 | 1 | ▲1 |
| Greens | 2,748 | 2.8 | +1.1 | 0 | Steady |
| Independent | 968 | 1.0 | | 0 | Steady |
| Formal votes | 97,461 | 96.48 | | | |

== Controversies ==
=== Drag queen storytime ban ===
In February 2024, Cumberland City Council voted in favour of banning drag queen storytime from council events.

=== Same-sex parenting book ban ===
On 1 May 2024, Cumberland City Council voted in favour of removing a book about same-sex parenting from council libraries. The motion was proposed by Councillors Christou and Garrard and passed with 6 votes in favour and 5 against. The state Government's Arts Minister John Graham threatened to cut funding for the council's libraries due to this motion against same-sex books passing.

On 15 May 2024, Cumberland City Council voted in favour of a motion to rescind the initial book ban. Separately proposed amendments by Councillors Christou and Garrard to move the book in question to the adult section of the library were voted down, with Councillor Huang stating "we won't compromise on the principle[s] of equality and fairness". Following four hours of debate, the motion was passed with 12 votes in favour and 2 against. Councillors Hughes, Cummings, Hussein, Garrard, and Zaiter changed their position from 1 May to support the rescission motion on 15 May 2024, while Councillors Christou and Sarkis, the latter of whom was not present in the first meeting, voted to keep the ban.

On the night of 15 May, police and security guards were present as protesters clashed over the book ban outside the council chambers at Merrylands. One councillor, Eddy Sarkis, who initially supported the ban, stated, "I read the book and have come to the conclusion that nothing sexualises children in this book".

== See also ==
- Local government areas of New South Wales
