= 2024 New South Wales local elections =

- 14 September 2024

127 of the 128 local government areas in New South Wales

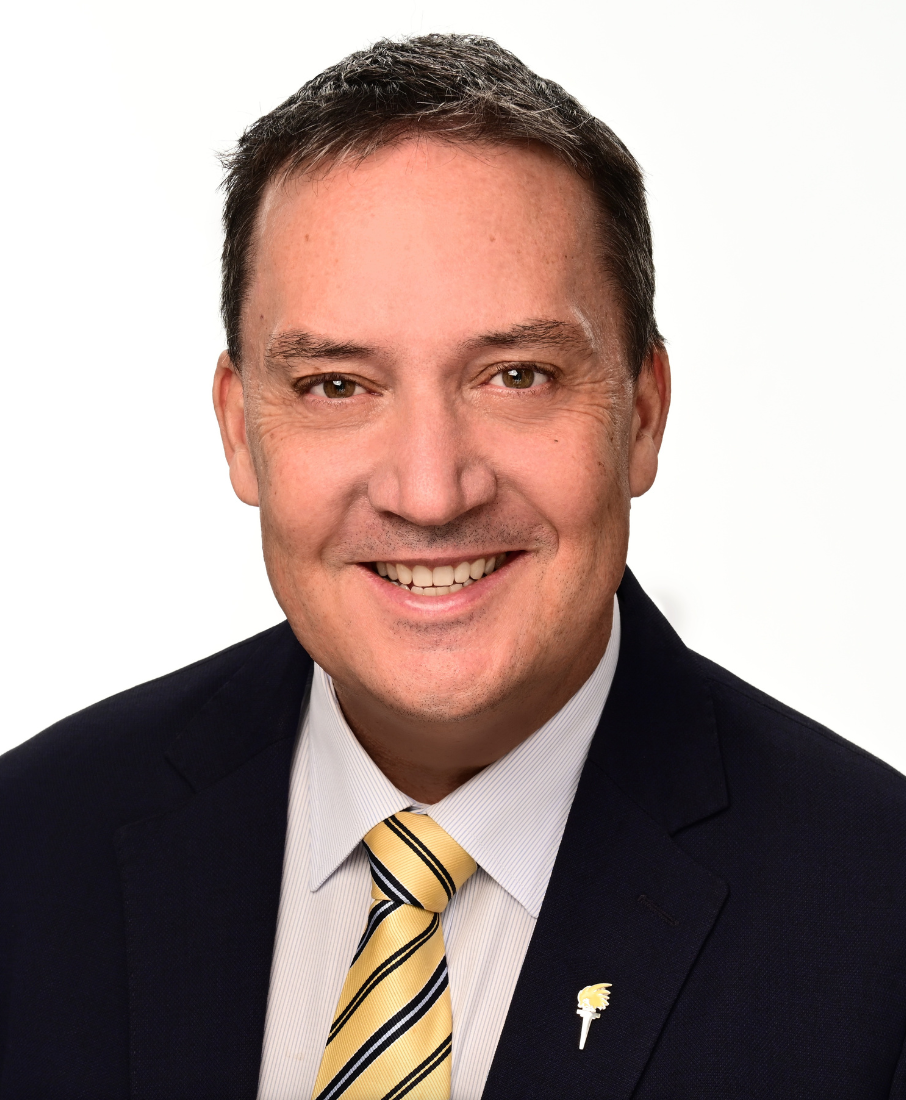

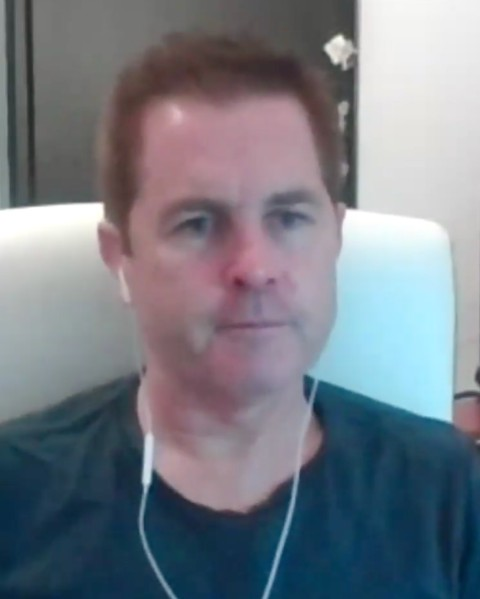
	First party	Second party	Third party
	IND
Leader	N/A	N/A	N/A
Party	Independents (Note: Including local groups (not to be confused with locally-registered political parties).)	Labor	Liberal
Last election	776 seats	188 seats	127 seats
Seats before	784	184	129
Seats won	722	162	115
Seat change	▼54	▼26	▼12
Primary vote	1,386,557	1,107,839	750,296
Percentage	32.57%	26.02%	17.62%
Swing	▼0.16	▼0.65	▼0.10
	Fourth party	Fifth party	Sixth party
			OLC
Leader	No leader	John Ruddick	Paul Garrard
Party	Greens	Libertarian	OLC
Last election	65 seats	0 seats	10 seats
Seats before	64 (Note: John Castellari resigned from Snowy Monaro Regional Council in September 2022 and Sue Abbott resigned from Upper Hunter Shire Council in December 2022. However, Nambucca Valley councillor David Jones joined the party in June 2024.)	1 (Note: John Larter (Snowy Valleys) joined the party in December 2021 and was endorsed by the party in July 2024.)	9 (Note: Eddy Sarkis (Cumberland) left the party in February 2024.)
Seats won	73	10	5
Seat change	▲8	▲10	▼4
Primary vote	411,999	87,056	42,834
Percentage	9.68%	2.04%	1.01%
Swing	▲0.84	▲1.93	▼0.80
	Seventh party	Eighth party	Ninth party
		AJP
Leader	No leader	No leader	William Bourke
Party	Community Voice	Animal Justice	Sustainable
Last election	Did not exist	1 seat	2 seats
Seats before	0	1	2
Seats won	3	0	1
Seat change	▲3	▼1	▼1
Primary vote	23,222	15,634	13,865
Percentage	0.55%	0.37%	0.33%
Swing	▲0.55	▲0.13	▼0.15

Local government elections in New South Wales, Australia were held on 14 September 2024 to elect the councils of 127 of the 128 local government area. 37 councils also held mayoral elections, and eight councils conducted referendums.

The New South Wales Electoral Commission (NSWEC) conducted the elections for 125 councils, while the private Australian Election Company conducted the elections for Fairfield and Liverpool. No election was held for Central Darling as the council was under administration.

== Background ==
=== Liverpool investigation ===
On 26 April 2024, Minister for Local Government Ron Hoenig announced an investigation into Liverpool City Council "amid ongoing reports about dysfunction and staff matters within council".

The investigation concluded on 18 July, and Hoenig announced he intended to defer Liverpool's election and suspend the council because of "widespread and serious concerns about dysfunction".

On 5 September, it was announced that the election would proceed and Hoenig backed down on his threat to suspend Liverpool City Council, awaiting the report of a further inquiry into the council's governance.

== Electoral system ==
Like at state elections, New South Wales local elections use optional preferential voting. Under this system, voters are only required to vote for one candidate or group, although they can choose to preference other candidates. The majority of mayors are elected by councillors at council meetings, although 37 were directly elected in 2024 (an increase from 35 in 2021).

All elections for councillor positions are elected using proportional representation. Some councils use a single ballot paper, while others have an Australian Senate-style ballot paper with above-the-line and below-the-line voting. Councils can be either undivided or be divided into wards ranging from two-member to five-member.

Voting is compulsory for anyone on the New South Wales state electoral roll. Property owners, rate-paying occupiers or lessees can apply to be on the "non-residential roll" in an LGA, as long as they are not already enrolled as a resident in that area and if they are eligible to be enrolled for state and federal elections. Voting is not compulsory for those on non-residential rolls, although it is still compulsory in the LGA where they are on the residential roll.

=== Business vote in Sydney ===
In 2014, then-Liberal premier Mike Baird introduced a law for that gave businesses that own, lease, or occupy rateable land in the City of Sydney two votes each. Voting for businesses in Sydney also became compulsory. Many critics saw the decision as an attempt by the Liberals to unseat Clover Moore as lord mayor. The business vote came into effect at the 2016 election and was again in force at the 2021 election.

Following Labor's victory at the 2023 state election, independent MP Alex Greenwich wrote to the new local government minister, Ron Hoenig, requesting that the business vote was removed.

On 13 September 2023 Hoenig formally announced that the business vote would be removed, starting at the 2024 election. Eligible people will still be able to apply to be on the non-residential roll, however only one person would now be entitled to be enrolled on behalf of non-residents − the same as all other LGAs.

== Party changes before elections ==
A number of councillors joined or left parties before the 2024 elections.

Council	Ward	Councillor	Former party	New party	Date
Snowy Valleys	Unsubdivided	John Larter	Independent	Independent Liberal Democrats	16 December 2021
Hilltops	Unsubdivided	Matthew Stadtmiller	Independent	Labor	2022
Campbelltown	Unsubdivided	George Brticevic	Labor	Independent	28 January 2022
Campbelltown	Unsubdivided	Margaret Chiversa	Labor	Independent	28 January 2022
Liverpool	South	Karress Rhodes	Community Independents	Independent	7 April 2022
Forbes	Unsubdivided	Steve Karaitiana	Independent	Shooters, Fishers, Farmers	5 May 2022
Lake Macquarie	North	Colin Grigg	Lake Mac Independents	One Nation	17 May 2022
Hay	Unsubdivided	Jenny Dwyer	Independent	Independent National	2 June 2022
Penrith	North	Jonathan Pullen	Labor	Independent	27 June 2022
Dubbo	Wellington	Jess Gough	Ben Shields Team	Independent	18 August 2022
Broken Hill	Unsubdivided	Dave Gallagher	National	Independent	23 September 2022
Hilltops	Unsubdivided	Matthew Stadtmiller	Labor	Independent	27 October 2022
Bega Valley	Unsubdivded	Russell Fitzpatrick	Independent	Liberal	24 November 2022
Port Macquarie-Hastings	Mayor	Peta Pinson	Independent	National	9 December 2022
Orange	Unsubdivided	Glenn Floyd	Shooters, Fishers, Farmers	Independent	13 December 2022
Singleton	Unsubdivided	Mel McLachlan	Shooters, Fishers, Farmers	Independent	13 December 2022
Coolamon	Unsubdivided	Jeremy Crocker	Shooters, Fishers, Farmers	Independent	Unknown date
Parramatta	Dundas	Kellie Darley	Kellie Darley Independents	Community Champions	28 April 2023
Blue Mountains	Ward 4	Brendan Christie	Liberal	Independent	3 July 2023
Sydney	Unsubdivided	Yvonne Weldon	Unite for Sydney	Yvonne Weldon Independents	19 July 2023
Hawkesbury	Unsubdivided	Nathan Zamprogno	Independent Liberal	Independent	5 September 2023
Lane Cove	Central	Kathy Bryla	Labor	Independent	6 September 2023
Bega Valley	Unsubdivded	Russell Fitzpatrick	Liberal	Independent	2023 or 2024
Cessnock	D Ward	Paul Paynter	Cessnock Independents	Liberal	22 January 2024
Northern Beaches	Pittwater	Michael Gencher	Your Northern Beaches	Liberal	28 January 2024
Cumberland	Greystanes	Eddy Sarkis	Our Local Community	Independent	February 2024
Strathfield	Unsubdivided	Sandy Reddy	Strathfield Independents	Liberal	27 February 2024
Nambucca Valley	Unsubdivided	David Jones	Independent	Greens	28 June 2024
Campbelltown	Unsubdivided	Josh Cotter	Community First Team	Community First Totally Independent	11 July 2024
Campbelltown	Unsubdivided	Warren Morrison	Totally Locally Committed	Community First Totally Independent	11 July 2024
Snowy Valleys	Unsubdivided	John Larter	Independent Libertarian	Libertarian	17 July 2024
Gunnedah	Unsubdivided	Jamie Chaffey	Independent	Independent National	5 August 2024

== Political parties ==
The following registered parties contested the local elections:

- Animal Justice Party
- Greens
- Labor Party
- Liberal Party
- Libertarian
- Shooters, Fishers and Farmers Party
- The Small Business Party
- Socialist Alliance
- Sustainable Australia Party

In addition, a number of local government-registered parties also contested.

== Candidates ==
A total of 3,889 candidates contested the elections for both mayoral and councillor positions. Of that, 1,635 candidates were contesting councillor and mayoral positions in Greater Sydney LGAs. Candidate nominations closed at midday on 14 August 2024.

The Greens had 376 councillor candidates and 22 mayoral candidates. More than 50 candidates were from a Hellenic background.

=== Liberal Party missed deadline ===
On the day that nominations closed, the Liberal Party revealed they had missed the deadline to nominate 164 candidates in 16 different LGAs. The error was described by Liberal leader Mark Speakman as "probably the worst act of mismanagement" in the party's history.

One day later, on 15 August 2024, the Liberal Party state executive resolved to terminate the employment of its state director, Richard Shields. Shields said party president Don Harwin volunteered to run the nomination process so he could maintain his focus on the next federal election.

Harwin requested that the NSWEC reopened nominations for another seven days, but his request was denied. The party then briefly considered taking legal action against the NSWEC, but ultimately decided against doing so.

== Campaign ==
The Libertarian Party campaigned on ending "woke agendas", "smart cities", and cutting council rates, and the party was given a higher chance of winning in areas where the Liberal Party had failed to nominate candidates. This was the party's largest-ever local elections campaign.

In Cumberland, Our Local Community (OLC) pledged to ban Welcome to Country and smoking ceremonies if elected to a majority. Shoalhaven Independents Group pledged to re-introduce Australia Day Awards and citizenship ceremonies on 26 January if the party gained control of Shoalhaven City Council.

=== Housing ===
Housing was seen as a significant issue in the elections, especially in Greater Sydney. Senior officials in the state government were reportedly "bracing for unpredictable election results" that would threaten the housing policies of the Labor government.

=== Israel–Gaza war ===
The Gaza war was the subject of campaigning in the local elections. Advocacy group Better Council targeted Greens candidates in the LGAs of Inner West, Randwick, Waverley and Woollahra over the party's "[focus] on radicalism". The group's spokesperson is Sophie Calland, a member of the Labor Party.

Another group, called "We Vote For Palestine", asked candidates to sign their pledge, which included supporting a ceasefire and divesting from Israel.

A number of Labor and Liberal campaign signs in Inner West Council were vandalised with "Boycott Israel" and "This Candidate Votes For Genocide" stickers.

== Results ==
Party	Votes	%	Swing	Seats (Note: Excluding directly-elected mayors.)	Change
Independents	1,386,557	32.57	−0.16	722	▼54
Labor	1,107,839	26.02	−0.65	162	▼26
Liberal	750,296	17.62	+0.10	110	▼17
Greens	411,999	9.68	+0.84	73	▲8
Libertarian	87,056	2.04	+1.93	10	▲10
Your Northern Beaches	71,095	1.67	+0.52	7	▲1
Independent Liberal	44,647	1.05	−1.33	16	▲8
Our Local Community	42,834	1.01	−0.80	5	▼5
Independent National	36,336	0.85	+0.45	37	▲28
Shoalhaven Independents Group	30,231	0.71	+0.03	6	▲2
Dai Le	30,052	0.71	+0.24	3	Steady
Lake Mac Independents	28,530	0.67	+0.05	3	Steady
Clover Moore Independent Team	28,201	0.66	−0.43	3	▼1
Residents and Ratepayers	24,839	0.58	+0.17	5	▲1
Community Voice of Australia	23,222	0.55	+0.55	3	▲3
Community First Totally Independent	17,494	0.41	+0.41	3	▲3
Animal Justice	15,634	0.37	+0.13	0	▼1
Independent Labor	14,362	0.34	+0.26	16	▲15
Sustainable Australia	13,865	0.33	+0.15	1	▼1
Community Champions	12,735	0.30	+0.30	1	▲1
Peaceful Bayside	11,536	0.27	+0.27	2	▲2
Shooters, Fishers and Farmers	10,619	0.25	−0.05	4	▼1
Residents First Woollahra	9,393	0.22	−0.05	5	Steady
Yvonne Weldon Independents	8,144	0.19	+0.19	1	▲1
Liverpool Community Independents Team	7,547	0.18	−0.09	1	▼1
Serving Mosman	7,062	0.17	0.00	3	▼1
Central Coast Heart	3,799	0.09	+0.09	0	Steady
Lorraine Wearne Independents	3,722	0.09	−0.15	1	Steady
Australia Multinational Unity Inc	3,715	0.09	+0.09	0	Steady
Small Business	3,474	0.08	−0.22	1	Steady
Strathfield Independents	3,401	0.08	−0.02	1	▼1
Battler	1,848	0.04	+0.04	0	Steady
Socialist Alliance	1,691	0.04	−0.03	0	Steady
Australian Christians	1,585	0.04	+0.04	0	Steady
Australian Democrats	967	0.02	+0.02	0	Steady
Independent One Nation	757	0.02	+0.02	0	Steady
Family First	241	0.01	+0.01	0	Steady
Public Education Party	82	0.00	+0.00	0	Steady
Independent United Australia				1	▲1
Formal votes	4,257,457				
Registered voters / turnout					

=== Council totals ===
LGA	Seats (excluding directly elected mayors)					
LGA	Labor	Liberal	Greens	Libertarian	Independents	Others (Note: Including other registered political parties and independents aligned with, but not endorsed by, political parties.)
Albury	1	Did not contest	1	Did not contest	7	Did not contest
Armidale	1	Did not contest	1	Did not contest	7	Did not contest
Ballina	0	0	3	Did not contest	6	0
Balranald	Did not contest	Did not contest	Did not contest	Did not contest	8	Did not contest
Bathurst	Did not contest	Did not contest	1	Did not contest	1	7
Bayside	6	5	1	Did not contest	1	2
Bega Valley	2	Did not contest	1	Did not contest	6	0
Bellingen	Did not contest	Did not contest	2	Did not contest	3	1
Berrigan	Did not contest	Did not contest	Did not contest	Did not contest	7	Did not contest
Blacktown	8	6	1	Did not contest	0	0
Bland	1	Did not contest	Did not contest	Did not contest	7	1
Blayney	Did not contest	Did not contest	Did not contest	Did not contest	6	1
Blue Mountains	9	Did not contest	2	0	1	0
Bogan	Did not contest	Did not contest	Did not contest	Did not contest	9	Did not contest
Bourke	Did not contest	Did not contest	Did not contest	Did not contest	9	Did not contest
Brewarrina	Did not contest	Did not contest	1	Did not contest	8	Did not contest
Broken Hill	2	Did not contest	Did not contest	Did not contest	7	Did not contest
Burwood	4	2	Did not contest	Did not contest	Did not contest	0
Byron	2	0	3	Did not contest	0	3
Cabonne	Did not contest	Did not contest	Did not contest	Did not contest	8	1
Camden	3	1	0	2	3	0
Campbelltown	6	Did not contest	2	Did not contest	1	6
Canada Bay	3	4	1	Did not contest	0	0
Canterbury-Bankstown	8	3	1	0	1	2
Carrathool	Did not contest	Did not contest	Did not contest	Did not contest	10	Did not contest
Central Coast	5	5	0	Did not contest	5	0
Central Darling	No election					
Cessnock	7	0	0	0	6	0
Clarence Valley	Did not contest	Did not contest	1	Did not contest	6	2
Cobar	Did not contest	1	Did not contest	Did not contest	11	Did not contest
Coffs Harbour	1	Did not contest	1	Did not contest	Did not contest	6
Coolamon	Did not contest	Did not contest	Did not contest	Did not contest	8	1
Coonamble	Did not contest	Did not contest	Did not contest	Did not contest	9	Did not contest
Cootamundra-Gundagai	1	Did not contest	Did not contest	Did not contest	7	1
Cowra	Did not contest	Did not contest	Did not contest	Did not contest	7	2 (Note: 1 Independent National and 1 Independent Labor)
Cumberland	5	4	1	0	2	3
Dubbo	3	Did not contest	Did not contest	Did not contest	6	2
Dungog	1	Did not contest	Did not contest	Did not contest	6	Did not contest
Edward River	Did not contest	2	Did not contest	Did not contest	7	0
Eurobodalla	1	Did not contest	1	0	0	7
Fairfield	2	Did not contest	Did not contest	Did not contest	1	10
Federation	Did not contest	Did not contest	Did not contest	Did not contest	7	2
Forbes	Did not contest	Did not contest	Did not contest	Did not contest	8	1
Georges River	6	3	0	0	1	5
Gilgandra	Did not contest	Did not contest	Did not contest	Did not contest	7	2
Glen Innes Severn	Did not contest	Did not contest	1	Did not contest	5	1
Goulburn Mulwaree	2	Did not contest	Did not contest	Did not contest	4	3
Greater Hume	Did not contest	0	Did not contest	Did not contest	9	Did not contest
Griffith	Did not contest	1	Did not contest	Did not contest	8	Did not contest
Gunnedah	1	Did not contest	Did not contest	Did not contest	4	3 (Note: 2 Independent National and 1 Independent Labor)
Gwydir	Did not contest	Did not contest	Did not contest	Did not contest	9	0
Hawkesbury	1	4	1	0	4	2
Hay	Did not contest	Did not contest	Did not contest	Did not contest	8	Did not contest
Hilltops	Did not contest	Did not contest	Did not contest	Did not contest	11	Did not contest
Hornsby	2	4	2	0	1	0
Hunter's Hill	Did not contest	4	Did not contest	Did not contest	2	Did not contest
Inner West	7	1	5	0	1	0
Inverell	Did not contest	Did not contest	Did not contest	Did not contest	9	Did not contest
Junee	Did not contest	Did not contest	Did not contest	Did not contest	5	3
Kempsey	Did not contest	Did not contest	1	Did not contest	7	Did not contest
Kiama	2	Did not contest	1	Did not contest	Did not contest	6
Ku-ring-gai	Did not contest	4	Did not contest	Did not contest	6	Did not contest
Kyogle	Did not contest	Did not contest	Did not contest	Did not contest	9	0
Lachlan	Did not contest	Did not contest	Did not contest	Did not contest	9	Did not contest
Lake Macquarie	5	3	0	Did not contest	1	3
Lane Cove	2	0	1	0	6	0
Leeton	Did not contest	Did not contest	Did not contest	Did not contest	7	2 (Note: 1 Independent Labor and 1 Independent Liberal)
Lismore	2	Did not contest	2	0	1	5
Lithgow	Did not contest	Did not contest	Did not contest	Did not contest	9	Did not contest
Liverpool	4	5	Did not contest			
Liverpool Plains	Did not contest	Did not contest	Did not contest	Did not contest	7	0
Lockhart	Did not contest	Did not contest	Did not contest	Did not contest	9	Did not contest
Maitland	4	1	0	Did not contest	7	0
Mid-Coast	2	Did not contest	2	3	5	Did not contest
Mid-Western	1	Did not contest	0	Did not contest	8	0
Moree Plains	Did not contest	Did not contest	Did not contest	Did not contest	9	Did not contest
Mosman	0	Did not contest	1	Did not contest	1	4
Murray River	Did not contest	0	Did not contest	Did not contest	9	Did not contest
Murrumbidgee	Did not contest	Did not contest	Did not contest	Did not contest	9	Did not contest
Muswellbrook	Did not contest	Did not contest	Did not contest	Did not contest	11	1 (Note: 1 Independent Labor)
Nambucca Valley	1	Did not contest	1	Did not contest	6	Did not contest
Narrabri	Did not contest	Did not contest	Did not contest	Did not contest	9	Did not contest
Narrandera	Did not contest	Did not contest	Did not contest	Did not contest	9	Did not contest
Narromine	Did not contest	Did not contest	Did not contest	Did not contest	7	2
Newcastle	5	2	3	Did not contest	2	1
North Sydney	2	2	1	Did not contest	5	0
Northern Beaches	0	1	4	Did not contest	2	8
Oberon	Did not contest	Did not contest	Did not contest	Did not contest	9	0
Orange	1	Did not contest	1	Did not contest	9	Did not contest
Parkes	Did not contest	Did not contest	Did not contest	0	10	0
Parramatta	6	6	1	0	0	2
Penrith	9	2	0	1	3	Did not contest
Port Macquarie-Hastings	1	1	1	1	0	4
Port Stephens	4	2	0	0	4	0
Queanbeyan-Palerang	3	3	1	Did not contest	1	3
Randwick	6	5	3	Did not contest	1	Did not contest
Richmond Valley	Did not contest	Did not contest	Did not contest	Did not contest	2	4
Ryde	3	7	1	Did not contest	1	Did not contest
Shellharbour	3	Did not contest	Did not contest	Did not contest	5	Did not contest
Shoalhaven	3	Did not contest	0	Did not contest	3	6
Singleton	2	Did not contest	0	1	6	Did not contest
Snowy Monaro	2	1	0	Did not contest	6	2
Snowy Valleys	Did not contest	1	Did not contest	1	7	0
Strathfield	2	3	0	Did not contest	2	0
Sutherland	5	6	0	0	4	0
Sydney	2	1	2	0	1	3
Tamworth	1	Did not contest	1	Did not contest	7	Did not contest
Temora	Did not contest	Did not contest	Did not contest	Did not contest	7	2
Tenterfield	Did not contest	Did not contest	Did not contest	Did not contest	10	Did not contest
The Hills	3	8	1	Did not contest	0	Did not contest
Tweed	1	2	1	Did not contest	1	2
Upper Hunter	Did not contest	Did not contest	Did not contest	Did not contest	7	2
Upper Lachlan	Did not contest	Did not contest	Did not contest	1	7	1
Uralla	Did not contest	Did not contest	Did not contest	Did not contest	8	Did not contest
Wagga Wagga	1	Did not contest	1	Did not contest	0	7
Walcha	Did not contest	Did not contest	Did not contest	Did not contest	8	Did not contest
Walgett	Did not contest	Did not contest	Did not contest	Did not contest	9	Did not contest
Warren	Did not contest	Did not contest	Did not contest	Did not contest	11	1
Warrumbungle	Did not contest	Did not contest	Did not contest	Did not contest	9	Did not contest
Waverley	3	6	2	Did not contest	1	0
Weddin	Did not contest	Did not contest	Did not contest	Did not contest	8	1
Wentworth	Did not contest	Did not contest	Did not contest	Did not contest	6	3
Willoughby	Did not contest	Did not contest	Did not contest	Did not contest	12	Did not contest
Wingecarribee	1	0	1	0	Did not contest	7
Wollondilly	Did not contest	0	Did not contest	Did not contest	8	Did not contest
Wollongong	7	Did not contest	3	Did not contest	2	Did not contest
Woollahra	Did not contest	9	1	Did not contest	Did not contest	5
Yass Valley	Did not contest	Did not contest	1	Did not contest	7	1

== Referendums and polls ==
In addition to the local elections, eight LGAs held referendums and a further two held advisory polls.

=== Referendums ===
LGA	Question	YES		NO		Informal		Turnout		Ref
LGA	Question	Votes	%	Votes	%	Votes	%	Total	%	Ref
Central Coast	"Do you favour a reduction in the number of Central Coast Councillors from 15 to 9 and a reduction in the number of wards from 5 to 3, with each ward electing 3 councillors?"	125,222	61.74	77,601	38.26	9,492	4.47	212,315	81.53	
Greater Hume	"Currently Greater Hume Council is divided into three wards that elect 9 councillors in total. - Do you favour abolishing this ward system in favour of a single area consisting of all voters that elects 9 councillors?"	2,175	35.01	4,037	64.99	471	7.05	6,683	81.07	
Greater Hume	"Currently Greater Hume Council is divided into three wards that elect 9 councillors in total. - Do you favour making no change to this system; that is three wards and 9 councillors remain?"	4,140	67.70	1,975	32.30	568	8.50	6,683	81.70	
Hilltops	"Do you want a reduction in the number of Hilltops Council Councillors from eleven to nine?"	7,428	63.85	4,206	36.15	292	2.45	11,926	81.77	
Kiama	"The Mayor of the Kiama Municipality is currently elected every two (2) years by the nine (9) elected Councillors. Do you want to change to the direct (popular) election of the Mayor by the voters of the Kiama Municipality, for a four (4) year term?"	6,811	45.33	8,213	54.67	400	2.59	15,424	85.69	
Kyogle	"Do you favour the election of the Mayor by electors for a four (4) year term with the number of Wards reduced from three (3) to two (2), each Ward comprising of four (4) Councillors, plus a popularly elected Mayor?"	2,073	37.30	3,484	62.70	192	3.34	5,749	84.05	
Port Macquarie-Hastings	"Do you favour a reduction in the number of Port Macquarie-Hastings Councillors from nine to seven, consisting of the Mayor and six Councillors?"	29,592	51.89	27,439	48.11	2,420	4.07	59,451	84.92	
Uralla	"Are you in favour of the Mayor being elected by the Councillors?"	1,756	47.67	1,928	52.33	144	3.76	3,828	81.46	
Uralla	"Are you in favour of removing the current ward system so that all electors vote for all Councillors that represent the Uralla Shire Council area?"	2,462	66.88	1,219	33.12	147	3.84	3,828	81.46	
Woollahra	"Woollahra Municipal Council currently has 15 Councillors. Do you favour reducing the total number of Councillors from 15 to 9? Please note that a reduction in the number of Councillors will result in a reduction of Wards across the Woollahra Municipal Council Local Government Area, likely to be a reduction of 5 Wards to 3."	13,818	49.02	14,373	50.98	844	2.91	29,035	72.26	

=== Polls ===
LGA	Question	YES		NO		Informal		Turnout		Ref
LGA	Question	Votes	%	Votes	%	Votes	%	Total	%	Ref
Coffs Harbour	"The Coffs Harbour Jetty Foreshore will be redeveloped. Do you agree that some of the foreshore land should be used for multi-level private residential development?"	15,122	31.32	33,161	68.68	993	2.02	49,276	83.60	
Federation	"Do you believe that the forced amalgamation by the State Government in 2016 was a mistake?"	5,412	76.60	1,653	23.40	818	10.38	7,883	79.10	
Federation	"Should the State Government compensate ratepayers for the ongoing costs of the amalgamation?"	5,958	84.13	1,124	15.87	801	10.16	7,883	79.10	
Federation	"Do you support that Council should approach the State Government to guarantee representation for the former Urana Shire?"	4,804	68.62	2,197	31.38	882	11.19	7,883	79.10	

== Results analysis ==
=== Labor ===
Labor had several significant wins, including gaining majorities in Wollongong and Penrith (the latter after all five Labor candidates in East Ward were elected unopposed) and holding off a Greens challenge on Inner West Council. However, the party lost majorities in Canterbury-Bankstown and Cumberland. Labor also suffered swings against them in Fairfield, where the Carbone-Le Alliance was returned to a majority with increased support. Labor's Newcastle lord mayor, Nuatali Nelmes, was also defeated.

=== Liberal ===
The Liberal Party was significantly impacted by its failure to nominate many candidates, but the party won a majority in Ryde (including winning Ryde's first directly elected mayoral election). The party also returned to having representation in Parramatta, after not endorsing candidates there in 2021. There was an increase in the number of Liberal members elected without party endorsement.

=== Greens ===
The Greens won their first-ever seats in Blacktown and Cumberland, as well as a record amount of seats for the party in Bayside, Campbelltown, Parramatta and Wollongong. However, the party lost votes in Randwick.

The party was completely wiped out of Shoalhaven, having lost their representation after 16 years on council, with three councillor positions, one for each ward, failing to be retained. They also failed to retain the mayoral spot, after 9 years of having the mayoral role. In neighbouring Kiama, the Greens had an almost 12% swing against them and retained only one of two seats; this was the first time in 20 years that the Greens were reduced to a single seat on the council.

=== Libertarian ===
The Libertarian Party benefited in areas where the Liberals were unable to recontest, especially MidCoast Council, where they became the largest party.

This was a record result for the party, which has previously won two seats at the 2012 local elections (under their former "Liberal Democrats" name). The party had the fourth-largest amount of candidates statewide, only behind Labor, the Liberals and the Greens.

=== Others ===
Your Northern Beaches Independent Team returned to being the largest party on Northern Beaches Council after the Liberals failed to nominate candidates.

Our Local Community lost its four seats in Parramatta. The Shooters, Fishers and Farmers Party won four seats (one less than 2021 but one more than what the party had before the election), including two councillors elected in Dubbo.

== See also ==
- 2024 New South Wales mayoral elections
