= Results of the 2012 New South Wales local elections =

2012 Australian election list

- 8 September 2012

This is a list of local government area results for the 2012 New South Wales local elections.

== Albury ==
Elected councillor	Party
Alice Glachan	Alice Glachan Team
Graham Docksey	Alice Glachan Team
Patricia Gould	Independent (Group D)
Ross Jackson	Albury Citizens
Daryl Betteridge	Independent (Group E)
Kevin Mack	Independent (Group L)
Henk van de Ven	Independent (Group J)
Darren Cameron	Country Labor
David Thurley	Independent (Group H)

2012 New South Wales local elections: Albury
Party	Candidate	Votes	%	±%
Alice Glachan Team		3,879	16.1	
Independent (Group D)		3,683	15.8	
Albury Citizens and Ratepayers Movement		2,751	11.4	+2.0
Independent (Group E)		2,671	11.1	
Independent (Group L)		1,927	8.0	
Independent (Group J)		1,713	7.1	
Country Labor		1,565	6.5	+6.5
Independent (Group H)		1,507	6.3	
Independent (Group A)		1,173	4.9	
Independent (Group F)		1,102	4.6	
Independent (Group G)		1,065	4.4	
Independent (Group K)		667	2.8	
Independent	Breck Scott-Young	211	0.9	
Independent	Peter Hood	65	0.3	
Independent	Leigh Tornquist	60	0.2	
Turnout			79.6	

== Armidale Dumaresq ==
Elected councillor	Party
Margaret O'Connor	Liberal
Peter O'Donohue	Greens
Jim Maher	Independent
Herman Beyersdorf	Armidale First
Bob Richardson	Independent
Andrew Murat	Independent
Laurie Bishop	Independent (Group B)
Jenny Bailey	Independent (Group E)
Colin Gadd	Independent
Christopher Halligan	Independent

2012 New South Wales local elections: Armidale Dumaresq
Party	Candidate	Votes	%	±%
Liberal		1,886	15.1	+3.4
Greens		1,720	13.8	+4.2
Independent	Jim Maher	1,457	11.7	
Armidale First		1,401	11.2	
Independent (Group B)		1,164	9.3	
Independent	Bob Richardson	935	7.5	
Independent	Andrew Murat	828	6.6	
Independent (Group E)		708	5.7	
Independent (Group D)		653	5.2	
Independent	Christopher Halligan	435	3.5	
Independent	Colin Gadd	430	3.4	
Independent	Jack Rapely	250	2.0	
Independent	Allan Mitchell	241	1.9	
Independent	Vicki Kembery	237	1.9	
Independent	Anthony Hardwick	138	1.1	
Turnout			82.0	

== Auburn ==
2012 New South Wales local elections: Auburn
Party	Votes	%	Swing	Seats	Change
Liberal	7,709	24.8	+9.6	3	▲1
Labor	6,993	22.5	−4.7	2	▼1
Independent	6,876	22.1	+7.7	2	▲1
Residents Action Group for Auburn Area	4,960	15.9	+2.9	2	▲1
Unity	1,604	5.2	−15.7	0	▼2
The Battler	1,588	5.1	+5.1	1	▲1
Greens	1,385	4.5	−4.9	0	▼1
Formal votes	31,115				

=== First Ward ===
Elected councillor	Party
Ronney Oueik	Liberal
Hicham Zraika	Labor
Semra Batik-Dundar	Residents Action
Le Lam	Independent (Group F)
Salim Mehajer	Independent (Group H)

2012 New South Wales local elections: First Ward
Party	Candidate	Votes	%	±%
Liberal		3,202	22.0	
Labor		3,131	21.6	
Residents Action Group		2,435	16.8	
Independent (Group F)		1,985	13.7	
Independent (Group H)		1,381	9.5	
Independent (Group B)		845	5.8	
Unity		770	5.3	
Independent (Group G)		436	3.0	
Independent (Group D)		237	1.6	
Independent	Nadeem Ashraf	106	0.7	
Turnout			82.3	

=== Second Ward ===
Elected councillor	Party
Ned Attie	Liberal
George Campbell	Labor
Irene Simms	Residents Action
Steve Yang	Liberal
Tony Oldfield	The Battler

2012 New South Wales local elections: Second Ward
Party	Candidate	Votes	%	±%
	Liberal	4,507	27.2	
	Labor	3,862	23.3	
	Residents Action Group	2,525	15.2	
	The Battler	1,588	9.6	+9.6
	Greens	1,385	8.3	
	Independent (Group D)	1,200	7.2	
	Unity	834	5.0	
	Independent (Group G)	686	4.1	
Turnout			84.6	

== Balranald ==
2012 New South Wales local elections: Balranald
Party	Candidate	Votes	%	±%
Independent	Stephen O'Halloran (elected)	419	35.8	−2.6
Independent	Leigh Byron (elected)	176	15.0	+3.3
Independent	Trevor Jolliffe (elected)	129	11.0	+11.0
Independent Labor	Alan Purtill (elected)	93	7.9	+0.2
Independent	Lynda Cooke (elected)	83	7.1	+7.1
Independent	Jeff Mannix (elected)	76	6.5	+3.0
Independent	Ken Barnes (elected)	80	6.8	+2.2
Independent	Elaine Campbell (elected)	50	4.3	+4.3
Independent	John Jackson	27	2.3	+2.3
Independent	Tina Powis	26	2.2	−3.1
Independent	Bill Vaarzon-Morel	12	1.0	+1.0
Turnout			79.6	
Party total votes
Independent		1,078	92.1	
Independent Labor		93	7.9	

== Berrigan ==
2012 New South Wales local elections: Berrigan
Party	Candidate	Votes	%	±%
Independent	1. Colin Jones (elected); 2. Denis Glanville (elected)	937	22.6	
Independent	John Bruce (elected)	828	20.0	−1.6
Independent	Matt Hannan (elected)	479	11.6	+1.3
Independent	Andrea O'Neill (elected)	421	10.2	+10.2
Independent	Daryll Morris (elected)	383	9.2	+9.2
Independent	Brian Hill (elected)	355	8.6	+1.2
Independent	Bernard Curtin (elected)	351	8.5	+0.7
Independent	Gary Mexted	252	6.1	+6.1
Independent	Liz McLaurin	135	3.3	−1.8
Turnout			79.4	

== Botany Bay ==
2012 New South Wales local elections: Botany Bay
Party	Votes	%	Swing	Seats	Change
Liberal	8,902	66.33		6	Steady
Independent	3,264	24.32		0	Steady
Greens	1,254	9.34		0	Steady
Formal votes	13,420				

=== Ward 1 ===
2012 New South Wales local elections: Ward 1
Party	Candidate	Votes	%	±%
Labor	George Glinatsis	unopposed		
Labor hold		Swing	N/A	

=== Ward 2 ===
2012 New South Wales local elections: Ward 2
Party	Candidate	Votes	%	±%
Labor	Brian Troy	2,255	68.0	−32.0
Independent	Sherry Butt	1,061	32.0	+32.0
Total formal votes		3,316	93.1	
Informal votes			6.9	
Labor hold		Swing	−32.0	

=== Ward 3 ===
2012 New South Wales local elections: Ward 3
Party	Candidate	Votes	%	±%
Labor	Christine Curry	2,373	65.7	−34.3
Independent	Charlie Trist	1,238	34.3	+34.3
Total formal votes		3,316	94.3	
Informal votes			5.7	
Labor hold		Swing	−34.3	

=== Ward 4 ===
2012 New South Wales local elections: Ward 4
Party	Candidate	Votes	%	±%
Labor	Stan Kondilios	2,019	56.8	−43.2
Independent	Rafi Alam	965	27.2	+27.2
Greens	Paul Child	570	16.0	+16.0
Total formal votes		2,612	92.8	
Informal votes			7.2	
Labor hold		Swing	−20.8	

=== Ward 5 ===
2012 New South Wales local elections: Ward 5
Party	Candidate	Votes	%	±%
Labor	Greg Mitchell	unopposed		
Labor hold		Swing	N/A	

=== Ward 6 ===
2012 New South Wales local elections: Ward 6
Party	Candidate	Votes	%	±%
Labor	Mark Castle	2,255	79.2	−20.8
Greens	Rafi Alam	684	20.8	+20.8
Total formal votes		2,612	92.8	
Informal votes			7.2	
Labor hold		Swing	−20.8	

== Queanbeyan ==
2012 Queanbeyan City Council election
- 8 September 2012

All 9 seats on Queanbeyan City Council
- Registered: 26,617
- Mayor
- Turnout: 75.7%
	First party	Second party	Third party
	TOT		IND
Candidate	Tim Overall	Brian Brown	Jamie Cregan
Party	Tim Overall Team	Labor	Independent
Primary vote	10,380	3,009	2,709
Percentage	54.18%	15.71%	14.14%
Elected mayor
Tim Overall
Tim Overall Team
- Councillors
- All 8 Councillors (out of 9 seats) on Queanbeyan City Council
- Turnout: 75.9%
Party	Vote %	Seats	+/–
Tim Overall Team	44.5	4	
Independents	31.8	3	
Labor	18.3	2	
Greens	5.4	0	
This lists parties that won seats. See the complete results below.
Largest party following election
Tim Overall Team

=== Queanbeyan results ===
Elected councillor	Party
Trudy Taylor	Tim Overall Team
Brian Brown	Labor
Jamie Cregan	Independent (Group C)
Sue Whelan	Independent (Group A)
Velice Trajanoski	Tim Overall Team
Peter Bray	Tim Overall Team
Toni McLennan	Tim Overall Team
Judith Burfoot	Labor
Kenrick Winchester	Independent (Group D)

2012 New South Wales local elections: Queanbeyan
Party	Candidate	Votes	%	±%
Tim Overall Team		8,169	44.5	
Labor (Group B)		3,363	18.3	
Independent (Group A)		1,919	10.4	
Independent (Group C)		2,643	14.4	
Independent (Group D)		1,169	6.4	
Greens		984	5.4	
Independent	Brent Hunter	117	0.6	
Total formal votes		18,364	91.0	
Informal votes			9.0	
Turnout			76.4	

=== Queanbeyan mayoral results ===
2012 New South Wales local elections: Queanbeyan mayor
Party	Candidate	Votes	%	±%
Tim Overall Team	Tim Overall	10,380	54.2	
Labor	Brian Brown	3,009	15.7	
Independent	Jamie Cregan	2,709	14.1	
Independent	Sue Whelan	1,546	8.1	
Independent	Ann Rocca	1,515	7.9	
Total formal votes		19,159	95.1	
Informal votes		993	4.9	
Turnout		20,152	75.7	

== Sydney ==
2012 New South Wales local elections: Sydney
Party	Candidate	Votes	%	±%
Team Clover	1. Clover Moore; 2. Robert Kok (elected 1); 3. Robyn Kemmis (elected 4); 4. John Mont (elected 5); 5. Jenny Green (elected 6); 6. Nell Schofield; 7. Claudia McIntosh; 8. Alex Greenwich; 9. John Hutchinson	30,352	46.0	−3.9
Liberal	1. Edward Mandla (elected 2); 2. Christine Forster (elected 9); 3. Sean O'Connor; 4. Joe Alvaro; 5. Lisa Fenwick; 6. Tony Eriksen; 7. Rebecca Lau	12,067	18.3	+3.3
Labor	1. Linda Scott (elected 3); 2. Damian Spruce; 3. Jo Holder; 4. Robyn Fortescue; 5. Hilary Mortlock; 6. Collin Lyon; 7. Jade Tyrrell; 8. Graham Brecht; 9. Peter McNally; 10. Gregory Lovekin	8,093	12.3	−4.4
Greens	1. Irene Doutney (elected 7); 2. De Brierley Newton; 3. Mark Smith; 4. Caroline Alcorso; 5. Christopher Brentin; 6. Dejay Toborek; 7. Roman Deauna; 8. Armen Aghazarian; 9. Isabel McIntosh	6,197	9.4	−8.8
Living Sydney Team	1. Angela Vithoulkas (elected 8); 2. Margaret Harvie; 3. Stephan Gyory; 4. Angelo Tsirbas; 5. Linda Wang; 6. Jill Yates; 7. Andrew Duckmanton; 8. Fabian Marsden	5,524	8.4	+8.4
Sex Party	1. Andrew Patterson; 2. Zahra Stardust; 3. Geoffrey Thomas; 4. Robyn Trigg; 5. Graeme Dunne	2,149	3.3	+3.3
Independent	1. Dixie Coulton; 2. Robbie Hall; 3. Maddalen Panuccio; 4. Rebecca Goldsworthy; 5. Virginia Buckworth; 6. Andrew Male	819	1.2	+1.2
Housing Action Team	1. Denis Doherty; 2. Ray Jackson; 3. Jay Fletcher; 4. Raul Bassi; 5. Andrew Chuter	764	1.2	+1.2
Independent	Stuart Baanstra	16	0.0	
Total formal votes		65,981	93.8	
Informal votes			6.2	
Turnout			69.4	
Party total seats			Seats	±
Clover Moore Independent Team			4	▼1
Liberal			2	▲1
Labor			1	Steady
Greens			1	▼1
Living Sydney Team			1	▲1
