= 2016 Sydney City Council election =

- 10 September 2016
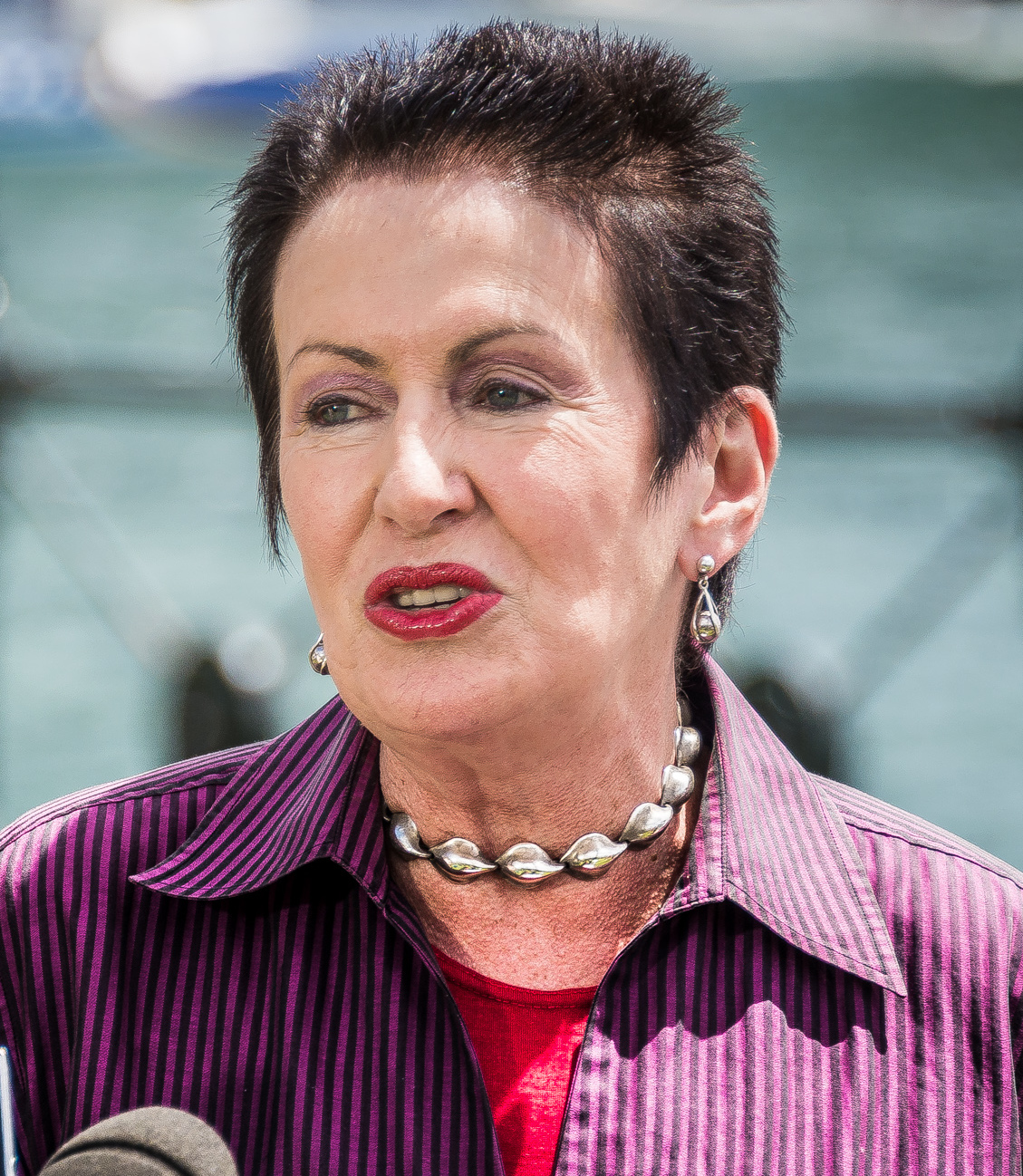

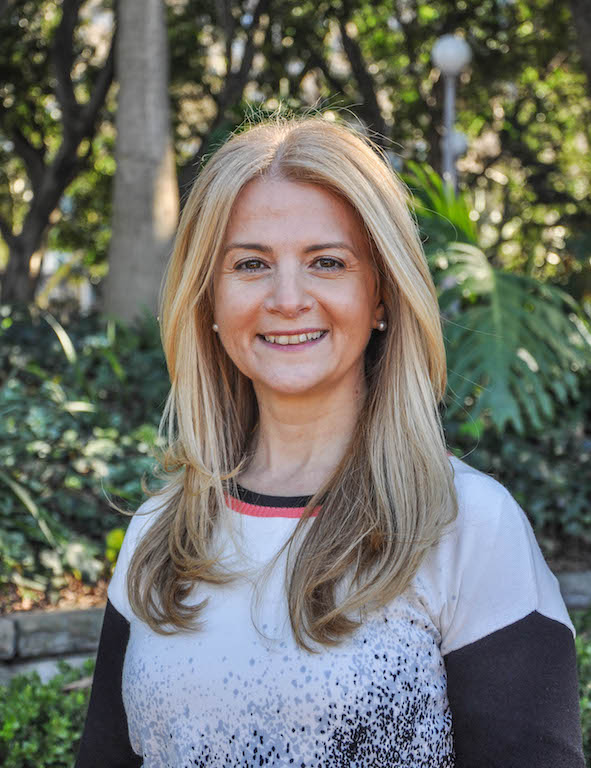

Candidate	Clover Moore	Christine Forster	Linda Scott
Party	Team Clover	Liberal	Labor
Popular vote	48,068	15,753	8,673
Percentage	57.83%	18.95%	10.43%
Candidate	Angela Vithoulkas	Lindsay Johnston
Party	Sydney Matters	Greens
Popular vote	6,432	4,200
Percentage	7.74%	5.05%
- Councillors
- All 10 seats on the Sydney City Council; 5 seats needed for a majority
Party	Leader	Vote %	Seats	+/–
Team Clover	Clover Moore	54.93	6	+1
Liberal	Christine Forster	19.70	2	0
Labor	Linda Scott	11.63	1	0
Sydney Matters	Angela Vithoulkas	7.35	1	0
Greens	Lindsay Johnston	5.98	0	−1
This lists parties that won seats. See the complete results below.

An election was held for the City of Sydney council was held on 10 September 2016 to elect nine councillors and a lord mayor to the City of Sydney. The election held as part of the statewide local government elections in New South Wales, Australia.

Clover Moore was re-elected Lord Mayor of Sydney.

== Background ==
Clover Moore, an independent had served as Lord Mayor since 2004 and had won the last election, held in 2012.

In 2014, she did not declare her candidacy, prompting many to believe she would not run.

Many parties, namely the Liberals, used the slogan "No Moore" in their election campaigns.

Moore won a fourth consecutive term in office.

== Electoral system ==
Unlike other councils in Sydney and elsewhere in Australia, the Sydney City Council has no wards.

== Newspaper endorsements ==
Newspaper	Endorsement	Link
The Daily Telegraph	Liberal	
