= 2012 New South Wales local elections =

- 8 September 2012

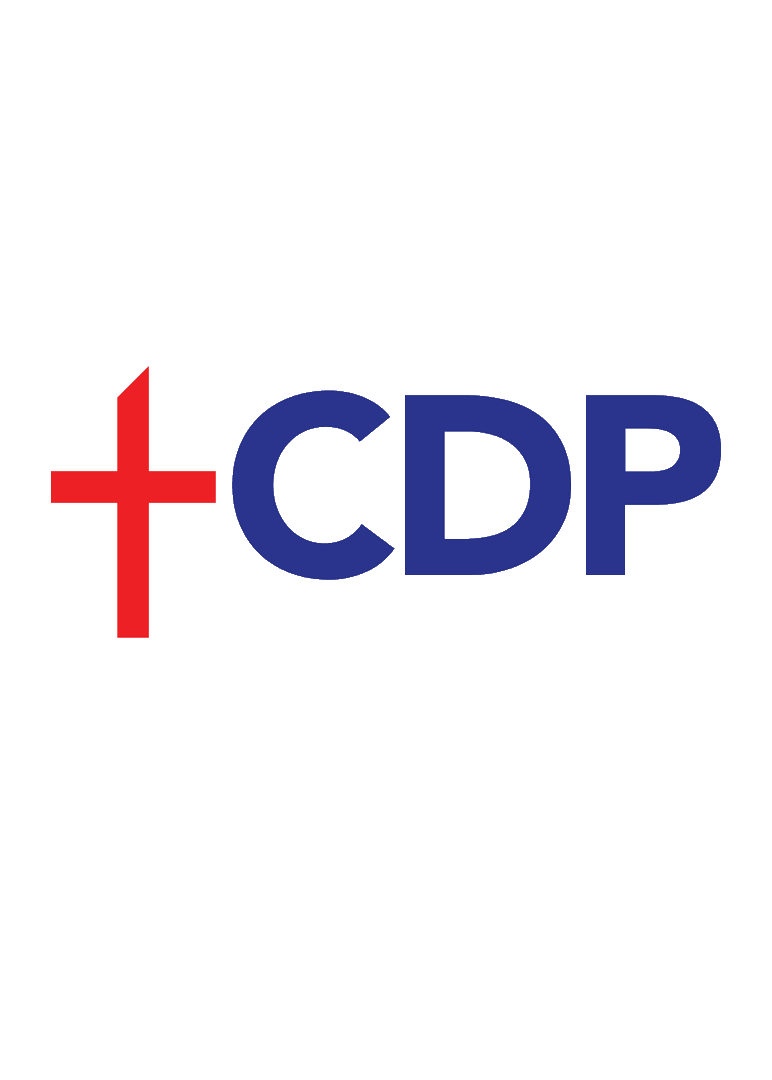

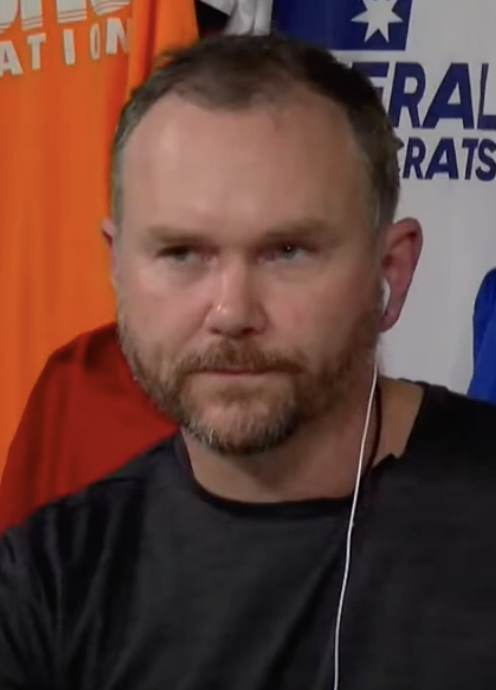

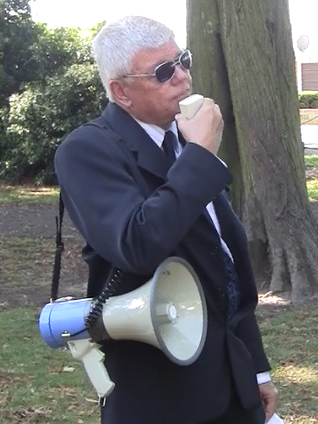

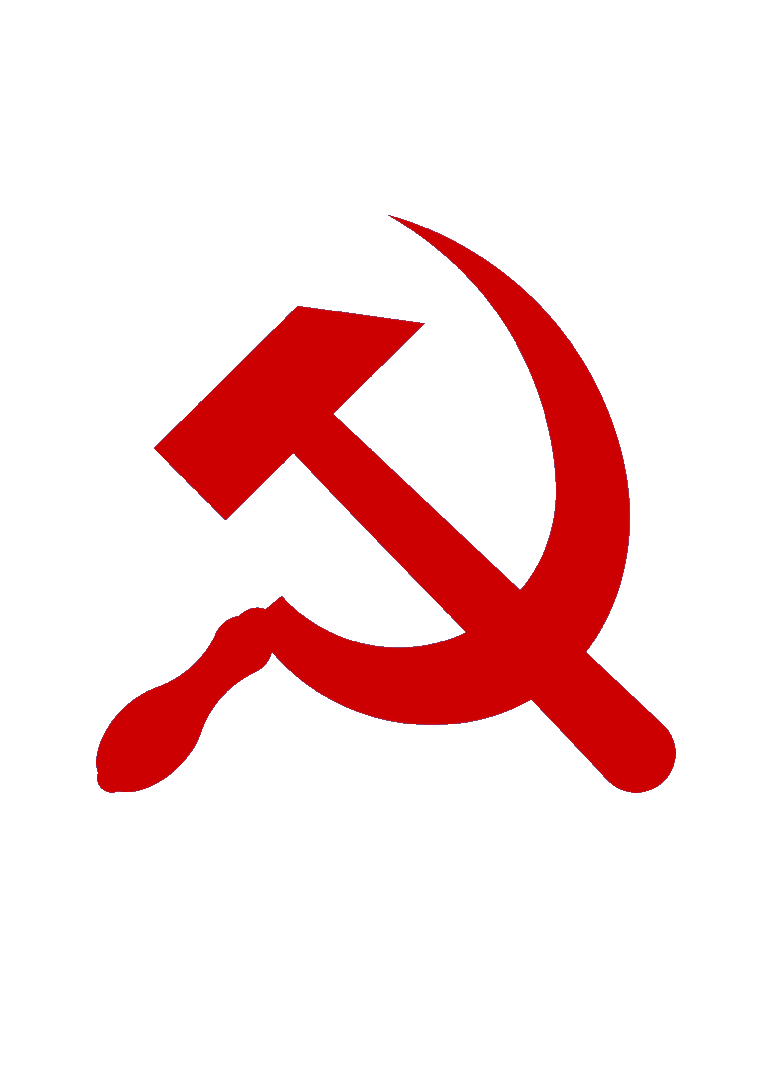
	First party	Second party	Third party
	IND
Leader	N/A	N/A	N/A
Party	Independents	Liberal	Labor
Seats won	927	172	152
Popular vote	1,306,350	748,349	656,552
Percentage	38.14%	21.85%	19.17%
	Fourth party	Fifth party	Sixth party
		UNI
Leader	No leader	No leader	Fred Nile
Party	Greens	Unity	Christian Democrats
Last election			1
Seats before			0
Seats won	38	3	0
Seat change			Steady
Popular vote	228,708	15,005	14,032
Percentage	6.68%	0.44%	0.41%
	Seventh party	Eighth party	Ninth party
Leader	John Humphreys	Jim Saleam	No leader
Party	Liberal Democrats	Australia First	Communist
Last election	0	0	0
Seats before	0	0	0
Seats won	2	1	1
Seat change	▲2	▲1	▲1
Popular vote	10,492	6,421	2,352
Percentage	0.31%	0.19%	0.07%

The 2012 New South Wales local elections were held on 8 September 2012 to elect the councils of 150 of the 152 local government areas (LGAs) of New South Wales, Australia. Several councils also held mayoral elections and/or referendums.

The elections were conducted by the New South Wales Electoral Commission, with the exception of 14 councils who chose to conduct their own elections or use the services of the private Australian Election Company.

No elections were held in Shellharbour or Wollongong as electors had voted a year prior in 2011, following the sackings of both councils in 2008.

The Liberal Party chose not to contest the elections in Fairfield and Penrith, leading to Liberal councillors running as Independent Liberals.

More than 16 wards across the state were uncontested.

== Parties ==
The following registered parties contested this election. This does not include groups of independents:

- Christian Democrats
- Greens
- Labor Party
- Liberal Democrats
- Liberal Party
- Socialist Alliance
- Unity Party

In addition, a number of local government-registered parties also contested the elections.

== Party changes before elections ==
Council	Ward	Councillor	Former party	New party	Date
Wagga Wagga	Undivided	Garry Hiscock	Independent	Business	20 July 2009
Hornsby	Mayor	Nick Berman	Liberal	Independent	11 November 2010
Newcastle	Ward 4	Mike Jackson	Labor	Independent	16 February 2011
Newcastle	Ward 4	Mike Jackson	Independent	Liberal	15 April 2011
Auburn	First Ward	Le Lam	Unity	Independent	2011
Ashfield	South	Morris Mansour	Liberal	Independent	2011
Uralla	A Ward	Isabel Strutt	Christian Democrats	Independent	2012

== Results ==
Party	Votes	%	Swing	Seats (Note: Excluding directly-elected mayors.)	Change
Independents	1,306,350	38.14		927	
Liberal	748,349	21.85		172	
Labor	656,552	19.17		152	
Greens	228,708	6.68		38	
Independent Liberal	132,756	3.87		33	
Independent National	33,882	0.99		15	
Your Warringah	33,757	0.98		5	
Clover Moore Independent Team	30,352	0.89		4	▼1
Independent Lake Alliance	26,242	0.77		4	
Shire Watch Independents	20,654	0.60		1	
Independent Labor	16,061	0.47		11	
Unity	15,005	0.44		3	
Christian Democrats	14,032	0.41		0	
Save Tuggerah Lakes	11,465	0.33		2	
Shoalhaven Independents Group	11,171	0.33		3	
Liberal Democrats	10,492	0.31		2	▲2
Holroyd Independents	8,567	0.25		2	
Eurobodalla Ratepayers Action	8,059	0.23		4	
Lorraine Wearne	7,914	0.23		2	
Residents First Woollahra	7,502	0.22		5	
Totally Locally Committed	7,364	0.21		2	
Liverpool Community Independents Team	7,363	0.21		1	
Australia First	6,421	0.19		1	▲1
Parramatta Independents	5,628	0.17		0	
Living Sydney	5,524	0.17	+0.17	1	▲1
Community First	5,386	0.16		1	
Residents Action For Auburn	4,960	0.14		2	
Building Australia	4,448	0.13	+0.13	0	Steady
No Parking Meters	4,446	0.13		0	▼1
Bob Thompson	4,140	0.12		1	
Serving Mosman	4,128	0.12		2	
Woodville Independents	4,118	0.12		0	
Community Service Environment	3,977	0.12		1	
Democratic Labor	3,700	0.11		1	
Manly Independents	3,609	0.10		2	
Burwood Community Voice	3,559	0.10		1	
Residents For Mosman	3,155	0.09		1	
Our Sustainable Future	2,792	0.08		2	
Albury Citizens and Ratepayers	2,751	0.08		1	
Parramatta Better Local Government	2,602	0.07		0	
Communist	2,352	0.07		1	▲1
Sex Party	2,149	0.06	+0.06	0	Steady
Save Our State	888	0.02		0	
Kogarah Residents	804	0.02		0	Steady
Socialist Alliance	724	0.02		0	Steady
Protectionist	256	0.01		0	Steady
Family First	126	0.01		0	Steady
Democrats	103	0.01		0	Steady
Total	3,425,343	100.00	–	–	–

== Aftermath ==
The Liberal Democrats had their first-ever electoral victories, with Jeff Pettett and Clinton Mead elected to Ku-ring-gai Council and Campbelltown City Council respectively.

The election of Tony Oldfield to Auburn City Council remains the only time the present-day Communist Party of Australia had had an electoral win.

Australia First councillor Maurice Girotto left the party in 2013 to sit as an independent, before joining the Christian Democrats in March 2016.

Following the elections, major changes occurred as a result of the enactment of the Local Government (Areas) Act 1948 and as a result of a review by the NSW Independent Pricing and Regulatory Tribunal (IPART) that commenced in 2013. On 12 May 2016, following a further review by the Minister for Local Government and the independent Local Government Boundaries Commission, Premier Mike Baird announced Stage 1 starting with 19 new councils, through amalgamations and mergers, with immediate effect. The Minister indicated in principle support to create a further nine new councils, subject to the decision of the courts. On the same day, the Governor of New South Wales acted on the advice of the Minister, and proclaimed the 19 new local government areas. Another proclamation occurred a few months later with the amalgamation of City of Botany Bay and City of Rockdale.

This resulted in 79 councils being contested in 2016 and 46 in 2017, before the vast majority contested together again in 2021.

== By-elections ==
The New South Wales Electoral Commission held a number of by-elections to fill vacancies on councils after the 2012 elections up until 2016.

Council	Ward	Before		Change		Result after preference distribution			
Council	Ward	Councillor	Party	Cause	Date	Date	Party	Candidate	%
Hurstville	Hurstville					15 March 2014	Labor	Brent Thomas	57.59
Hurstville	Hurstville					15 March 2014	Liberal	Tim Feng (Note: Second-placed on primary vote as the by-election did not require preference distribution.)	30.44
Woollahra	Double Bay					15 March 2014	Liberal	James Keulemans	55.80
Woollahra	Double Bay					15 March 2014	Residents First	Anne Crooks	25.25
Willoughby	Sailors Bay	Gail Giles-Gidney	Independent Liberal	Elected as mayor	12 April 2014	14 June 2014	Independent	Rachel Hill	64.79
Willoughby	Sailors Bay	Gail Giles-Gidney	Independent Liberal	Elected as mayor	12 April 2014	14 June 2014	Independent	Vache Kahramanian	22.51
Brewarrina	Unsubdivided	Jeanette Barker	Independent	Death	March 2014	21 June 2014	Independent	Bill Loughnan	56.48
Brewarrina	Unsubdivided	Jeanette Barker	Independent	Death	March 2014	21 June 2014	Independent	Tommy Stanton	43.52
Leichhardt	Birrabirragal/Balmain	Melinda Manikas	Liberal	Death	8 May 2014	2 August 2014	Independent	John Stamolis	60.61
Leichhardt	Birrabirragal/Balmain	Melinda Manikas	Liberal	Death	8 May 2014	2 August 2014	Labor	Aaron Di Pietro	39.39
Woollahra	Double Bay					23 August 2014	Independent	John Doyle	N/A
Woollahra	Double Bay					23 August 2014	Elected unopposed		
Cobar	Unsubdivided					23 August 2014	Independent	Peter Abbott	85.80
Cobar	Unsubdivided					23 August 2014	Independent	Peter Florance	14.20
Marrickville	West	Emanuel Tsardoulias	Labor	Death	19 August 2014	23 August 2014	Labor	Daniel Barbar	50.08
Marrickville	West	Emanuel Tsardoulias	Labor	Death	19 August 2014	23 August 2014	Greens	Justine Langford	33.05
Blue Mountains	First Ward					15 November 2014	Labor	Sarah Shrubb	53.71
Blue Mountains	First Ward					15 November 2014	Greens	Kerry Brown	46.29
Blue Mountains	Second Ward					15 November 2014	Labor	Victoria Arney	53.01
Blue Mountains	Second Ward					15 November 2014	Independent	Rob Thompson	46.99
Clarence Valley	Unsubdivided					21 February 2015	Independent	Arthur Lysaught	N/A
Clarence Valley	Unsubdivided					21 February 2015	Elected unopposed		
Newcastle	Ward 3					21 February 2015	Labor	Declan Clausen	53.15
Newcastle	Ward 3					21 February 2015	Independent	Kath Elliott	46.85
Ryde	East					21 February 2015	Liberal	Jane Stott	52.77
Ryde	East					21 February 2015	Labor	Penny Pedersen	47.23
Wakool	B Ward					5 March 2016	Independent	David Landini	N/A
Wakool	B Ward					5 March 2016	Elected unopposed		
Wakool	C Ward	Colin Membrey	Independent	Resignation	December 2015	5 March 2016	No candidate declared elected		
Wakool	C Ward	N/A	N/A	No candidate elected	5 March 2016	9 April 2016	Independent	Alan Mathers	69.06
Wakool	C Ward	N/A	N/A	No candidate elected	5 March 2016	9 April 2016	Independent	Christine Dartnell	30.94

== Mayoral elections ==
2012 New South Wales local elections
- 8 September 2012

	First party	Second party
	IND
Leader	N/A	N/A
Party	Independents	Labor
	Third party	Fourth party
Leader	N/A	No leader
Party	Liberal	Greens

The 2012 New South Wales mayoral elections were held on 8 September 2012 to elect mayors or lord mayors to 36 of the 152 local government areas (LGAs) in New South Wales. The elections were held as part of the statewide local elections.

These were the last mayoral elections for Botany Bay, Canterbury, Greater Taree, Manly, Queanbeyan, Snowy River and Warringah − all of which were LGAs abolished in the 2016 local government proclamations.

=== Retiring mayors ===
- Greg Piper (Independent Lake Alliance) − Lake Macquarie, announced March 2012
- Genia McCaffery (Independent) − North Sydney, announced 12 June 2012
- John Tate (Independent) − Newcastle, announced 8 August 2012

=== Bellingen ===
2012 New South Wales mayoral elections: Bellingen
Party	Candidate	Votes	%	±%
Independent	Mark Troy	4,769	65.5	+29.0
Independent	Wayne Wadsworth	2,517	34.5	+34.5
Total formal votes		7,286	95.0	
Informal votes			5.0	
Turnout			82.5	
Independent hold		Swing	+29.0	

=== Botany Bay ===
2012 New South Wales mayoral elections: Botany Bay
Party	Candidate	Votes	%	±%
Labor	Ben Keneally	13,088	63.6	−36.4
Independent	John Ryan	3,259	15.8	+15.8
Independent	Sherry Butt	1,768	8.6	+8.6
Greens	Alan Hough	1,699	8.3	+8.3
Independent	Charlie Trist	749	3.6	+3.6
Total formal votes		20,563	94.9	
Informal votes			5.1	
Labor hold		Swing	−36.4	

=== Burwood ===
2012 New South Wales mayoral elections: Municipality of Burwood Mayor
Party	Candidate	Votes	%	±%
Labor	John Faker	5,626	44.38	
Liberal	Justin Taunton	4,420	27.74	
Burwood Community Voice	Lesley Furneaux-Cook	3,386	21.25	
Independent	David Wieley	1,057	6.63	
Total formal votes		15,936	95.79	
Informal votes		700	4.21	
Turnout		16,636	84.69	
Two-candidate-preferred result
Labor	John Faker	7,949	59.85	
Liberal	Justin Taunton	5,332	40.15	
Labor win		Swing		

=== Eurobodalla ===
2012 New South Wales mayoral elections: Eurobodalla
Party	Candidate	Votes	%	±%
Independent	Graham Scobie	2,266	10.6	+2.5
Independent	Fergus Thomson	2,209	10.3	−10.7
Independent	Lindsay Brown	2,017	9.4	−2.8
Eurobodalla Ratepayers	Noel (Tubby) Harrison	1,638	7.6	+7.6
Eurobodalla First	Rob Pollock	1,636	7.6	−10.6
Eurobodalla Ratepayers	Liz Innes	1,481	6.9	+6.9
Greens	Gabi Harding	1,372	6.4	+6.4
Independent	Phil Constable	1,364	6.4	+6.4
Eurobodalla Ratepayers	Ron Gifford	1,033	4.8	+4.8
Independent	Chris Vardon	885	4.1	+4.1
Eurobodalla Ratepayers	Michele Cameron	805	3.8	+3.8
Eurobodalla Ratepayers	Neil Burnside	707	3.3	+3.3
Independent	Alan Morton	671	3.1	+3.1
Eurobodalla Ratepayers	Milton Leslight	621	2.9	+2.9
Eurobodalla Ratepayers	Peter Schwarz	603	2.8	+2.8
Independent	Allan Brown	512	2.4	−7.4
Independent	Orit Karny Winters	497	2.3	+2.3
Eurobodalla Ratepayers	Gary Smith	442	2.1	−2.9
Eurobodalla Ratepayers	April Creed	338	1.6	+1.6
Independent	Chris Kowal	211	1.0	−5.6
Independent	Glenda Bishop	156	0.7	+0.7
Total formal votes		21,464	94.2	
Informal votes		1,325	5.8	
Turnout		22,789	82.4	
Two-candidate-preferred result
Independent	Lindsay Brown	3,845	50.7	+50.7
Eurobodalla Ratepayers	Liz Innes	3,737	49.3	+49.3
Independent gain from Independent		Swing	N/A	

=== Fairfield ===
2012 New South Wales mayoral elections: Fairfield
Party	Candidate	Votes	%	±%
Labor	Frank Carbone	44,641	45.4	−15.0
Independent	Nhan Tran	15,833	16.1	+16.1
Independent Liberal	Zaya Toma	8,773	8.9	−24.6
Greens	Bill Cashman	8,371	8.5	+8.5
Independent	Sam Yousif	7,918	8.1	+8.1
Christian Democrats	Juliat Nasr	7,237	7.4	+7.4
Unity	Ken Yeung	5,647	5.7	+5.7
Total formal votes		98,450	90.8	
Informal votes			9.2	
Turnout			85.4	
Two-candidate-preferred result
Labor	Frank Carbone	49,041	71.3	+10.9
Independent	Nhan Tran	19,727	28.7	+28.7
Labor hold		Swing	N/A	

=== Lake Macquarie ===
2012 New South Wales mayoral elections: Lake Macquarie
Party	Candidate	Votes	%	±%
Labor	Jodie Harrison	37,202	32.8	+6.6
Independent Lake Alliance	Wendy Harrison	28,944	25.6	−35.6
Liberal	Ken Paxinos	25,367	22.4	+22.4
Independent	Jim Sullivan	9,831	8.7	+8.7
Greens	Phillipa Parsons	8,503	7.5	−5.1
Independent	Arjay Martin	3,424	3.0	+3.0
Total formal votes		113,276	93.8	
Informal votes			6.2	
Turnout			84.2	
Two-candidate-preferred result
Labor	Jodie Harrison	43,956	52.2	
Independent Lake Alliance	Wendy Harrison	40,296	47.8	
Labor gain from Independent Lake Alliance		Swing		

=== Nambucca ===
2012 New South Wales mayoral elections: Nambucca
Party	Candidate	Votes	%	±%
Independent	Rhonda Hoban	7,546	69.8	
Independent	John Ainsworth	3,266	30.2	
Total formal votes		10,812	96.0	
Informal votes			4.0	
Turnout			80.5	
Independent hold		Swing		

=== Newcastle ===
2012 New South Wales mayoral elections: Newcastle
Party	Candidate	Votes	%	±%
Independent	Jeff McCloy	36,663	43.1	+43.1
Labor	Nuatali Nelmes	24,128	28.4	+10.5
Greens	John Sutton	10,021	11.8	−2.2
Independent	Aaron Buman	6,226	7.3	−10.9
Independent	Jacqueline Haines	4,186	4.9	+4.9
Independent	Bryan Havenhand	2,298	2.7	+2.7
Independent	Col Peebles	1,497	1.8	+1.8
Total formal votes		85,019	94.7	
Informal votes			5.3	
Turnout			82.5	
Three-candidate-preferred result
Independent	Jeff McCloy	38,321	51.0	+51.0
Labor	Nuatali Nelmes	26,009	34.6	
Greens	John Sutton	10,883	14.5	
Independent gain from Independent		Swing	N/A	

=== North Sydney ===
2012 New South Wales mayoral elections: North Sydney
Party	Candidate	Votes	%	±%
Independent	Jilly Gibson	11,893	40.5	
Independent	Zoë Baker	9,731	33.1	
Independent	Suzanne Clarke-Nash	7,745	26.4	
Total formal votes		29,369	93.5	
Informal votes		2,040	6.5	
Turnout		31,409	74.1	
Two-candidate-preferred result
Independent	Jilly Gibson	14,559	56.8	
Independent	Zoë Baker	11,062	43.2	
Independent gain from Independent		Swing	N/A	

=== Queanbeyan ===
2012 New South Wales mayoral elections: Queanbeyan
Party	Candidate	Votes	%	±%
Tim Overall Team	Tim Overall	10,380	54.2	+9.5
Labor	Brian Brown	3,009	15.7	+15.7
Independent	Jamie Cregan	2,709	14.1	+14.1
Independent	Sue Whelan	1,546	8.1	+8.1
Independent	Ann Rocca	1,515	7.9	−8.1
Total formal votes		19,159	95.1	
Informal votes			4.9	
Turnout			76.3	
Tim Overall Team hold		Swing	+9.5	

=== Snowy River ===
2012 New South Wales mayoral elections: Snowy River
Party	Candidate	Votes	%	±%
Independent	John Cahill	1,470	42.3	+42.3
Independent	Peter Beer	1,069	30.7	+30.7
Independent	John Shumack	939	27.0	+27.0
Total formal votes		3,478	95.8	N/A
Informal votes			4.2	N/A
Turnout			77.7	N/A
Two-candidate-preferred result
Independent	John Cahill	1,606	56.5	+56.5
Independent	Peter Beer	1,236	43.5	+43.5
Independent win		Swing	N/A	

- This was the first time the position of mayor of Snowy River was directly-elected

=== Sydney ===
2012 New South Wales mayoral elections: Sydney
Party	Candidate	Votes	%	±%
Team Clover	Clover Moore	34,903	51.1	−5.4
Liberal	Edward Mandla	11,031	16.1	+2.1
Labor	Linda Scott	7,124	10.4	−4.6
Living Sydney Team	Angela Vithoulkas	6,722	9.8	+9.8
Greens	Irene Doutney	4,462	6.5	−6.9
Sex Party	Zahra Stardust	2,241	3.3	+3.3
Independent	Dixie Coulton	1,303	1.9	+1.9
Housing Action Team	Denis Doherty	557	0.8	+0.8
Total formal votes		68,343	97.4	
Informal votes			2.6	
Turnout			69.2	
Team Clover hold		Swing	−5.4	

=== Warringah ===
2012 New South Wales mayoral elections: Warringah
Party	Candidate	Votes	%	±%
Your Warringah	Michael Regan	41,161	56.3	+36.7
Independent Liberal	Pat Daley	12,935	17.7	+17.7
Independent	Vincent De Luca	9,756	13.4	+6.4
Greens	Conny Harris	9,222	12.6	−1.6
Total formal votes		32,800	94.4	
Informal votes		1,959	5.6	
Turnout		34,759		
Your Warringah hold		Swing	+36.7	

=== Willoughby ===
2012 New South Wales mayoral elections: Willoughby
Party	Candidate	Votes	%	±%
Independent	Pat Reilly	17,470	53.3	
Independent Liberal	Stuart Coppock	15,330	46.7	
Total formal votes		32,800	94.4	
Informal votes		1,959	5.6	
Turnout		34,759		
Independent hold		Swing		

== See also ==
- 2012 New South Wales mayoral elections
- 2012 Sydney City Council election
