= 2012 Sydney City Council election =

Sydney City Council election

- 8 September 2012
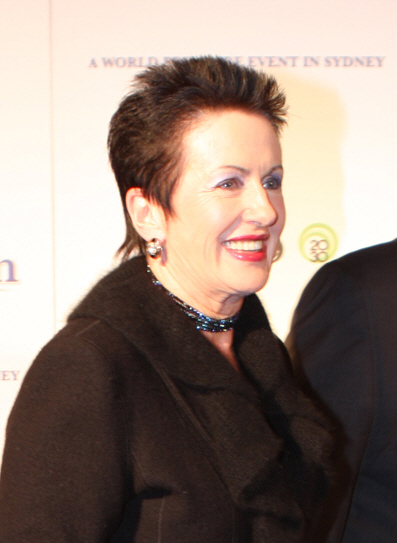

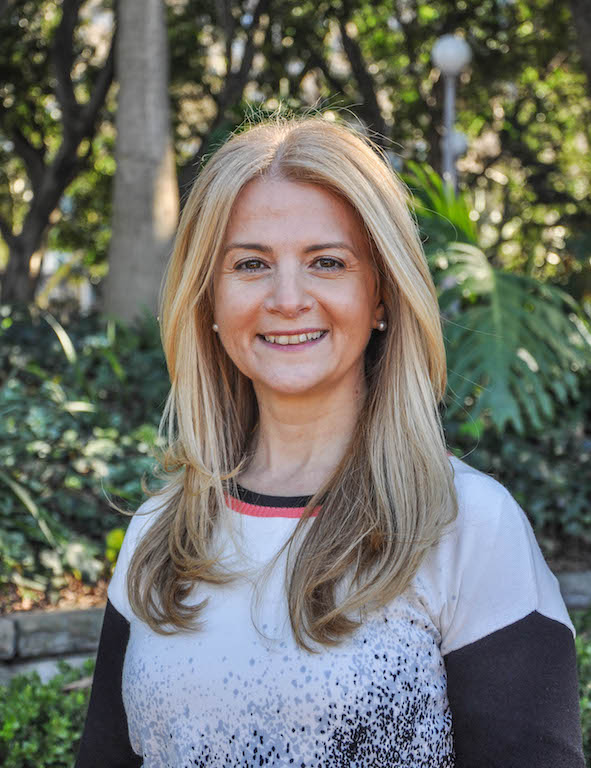

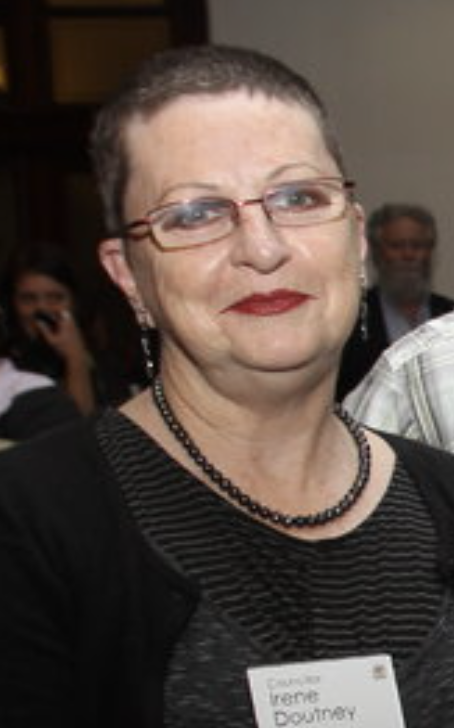
	First party	Second party	Third party
Candidate	Clover Moore	Edward Mandla	Linda Scott
Party	Team Clover	Liberal	Labor
Popular vote	34,903	11,031	7,124
Percentage	51.1%	16.1%	10.4%
Swing	▼5.4	▲2.1	▼4.6
	Fourth party	Fifth party	Sixth party
			SEX
Candidate	Angela Vithoulkas	Irene Doutney	Zahra Stardust
Party	Living Sydney	Greens	Sex Party
Popular vote	6,722	4,462	2,241
Percentage	9.8%	6.52%	3.3%
Swing	▲9.8	▼6.9	▲3.3
Lord Mayor before election
Clover Moore
Team Clover
Subsequent Lord Mayor
Clover Moore
Team Clover

The 2012 Sydney City Council election was held on 8 September 2012 to elect nine councillors and a lord mayor to the City of Sydney. The election was held as part of the statewide local government elections in New South Wales, Australia.

== Results ==
=== Lord Mayor ===
2012 New South Wales mayoral elections: Sydney
Party	Candidate	Votes	%	±%
Team Clover	Clover Moore	34,903	51.1	−5.4
Liberal	Edward Mandla	11,031	16.1	+2.1
Labor	Linda Scott	7,124	10.4	−4.6
Living Sydney Team	Angela Vithoulkas	6,722	9.8	+9.8
Greens	Irene Doutney	4,462	6.5	−6.9
Sex Party	Zahra Stardust	2,241	3.3	+3.3
Independent	Dixie Coulton	1,303	1.9	+1.9
Housing Action Team	Denis Doherty	557	0.8	+0.8
Total formal votes		68,343	97.4	
Informal votes			2.6	
Turnout			69.2	
Team Clover hold		Swing	−5.4	

=== Councillors ===
2012 New South Wales local elections: Sydney
Party	Candidate	Votes	%	±%
Team Clover	1. Clover Moore; 2. Robert Kok (elected 1); 3. Robyn Kemmis (elected 4); 4. John Mont (elected 5); 5. Jenny Green (elected 6); 6. Nell Schofield; 7. Claudia McIntosh; 8. Alex Greenwich; 9. John Hutchinson	30,352	46.0	−3.9
Liberal	1. Edward Mandla (elected 2); 2. Christine Forster (elected 9); 3. Sean O'Connor; 4. Joe Alvaro; 5. Lisa Fenwick; 6. Tony Eriksen; 7. Rebecca Lau	12,067	18.3	+3.3
Labor	1. Linda Scott (elected 3); 2. Damian Spruce; 3. Jo Holder; 4. Robyn Fortescue; 5. Hilary Mortlock; 6. Collin Lyon; 7. Jade Tyrrell; 8. Graham Brecht; 9. Peter McNally; 10. Gregory Lovekin	8,093	12.3	−4.4
Greens	1. Irene Doutney (elected 7); 2. De Brierley Newton; 3. Mark Smith; 4. Caroline Alcorso; 5. Christopher Brentin; 6. Dejay Toborek; 7. Roman Deauna; 8. Armen Aghazarian; 9. Isabel McIntosh	6,197	9.4	−8.8
Living Sydney Team	1. Angela Vithoulkas (elected 8); 2. Margaret Harvie; 3. Stephan Gyory; 4. Angelo Tsirbas; 5. Linda Wang; 6. Jill Yates; 7. Andrew Duckmanton; 8. Fabian Marsden	5,524	8.4	+8.4
Sex Party	1. Andrew Patterson; 2. Zahra Stardust; 3. Geoffrey Thomas; 4. Robyn Trigg; 5. Graeme Dunne	2,149	3.3	+3.3
Independent	1. Dixie Coulton; 2. Robbie Hall; 3. Maddalen Panuccio; 4. Rebecca Goldsworthy; 5. Virginia Buckworth; 6. Andrew Male	819	1.2	+1.2
Housing Action Team	1. Denis Doherty; 2. Ray Jackson; 3. Jay Fletcher; 4. Raul Bassi; 5. Andrew Chuter	764	1.2	+1.2
Independent	Stuart Baanstra	16	0.0	
Total formal votes		65,981	93.8	
Informal votes			6.2	
Turnout			69.4	
Party total seats			Seats	±
Clover Moore Independent Team			4	▼1
Liberal			2	▲1
Labor			1	Steady
Greens			1	▼1
Living Sydney Team			1	▲1
