= Mandla (disambiguation) =

Mandla is a city and municipality in Madhya Pradesh, India. Mandla may also refer to

- Mandla (name)
- Mandla district in Madhya Pradesh, India
  - Mandla Fort railway station in Mandla district
  - Mandla Plant Fossils National Park in Mandla district
  - Mandla (Lok Sabha constituency) in Madhya Pradesh, India
- Mandla v Dowell-Lee, a 1983 United Kingdom law case on racial discrimination
