= 2018 Wentworth by-election =

Australian federal by-election

- 20 October 2018

The Division of Wentworth (NSW) in the House of Representatives
- Registered: 103,747
- Turnout: 78.13% (▼8.11)
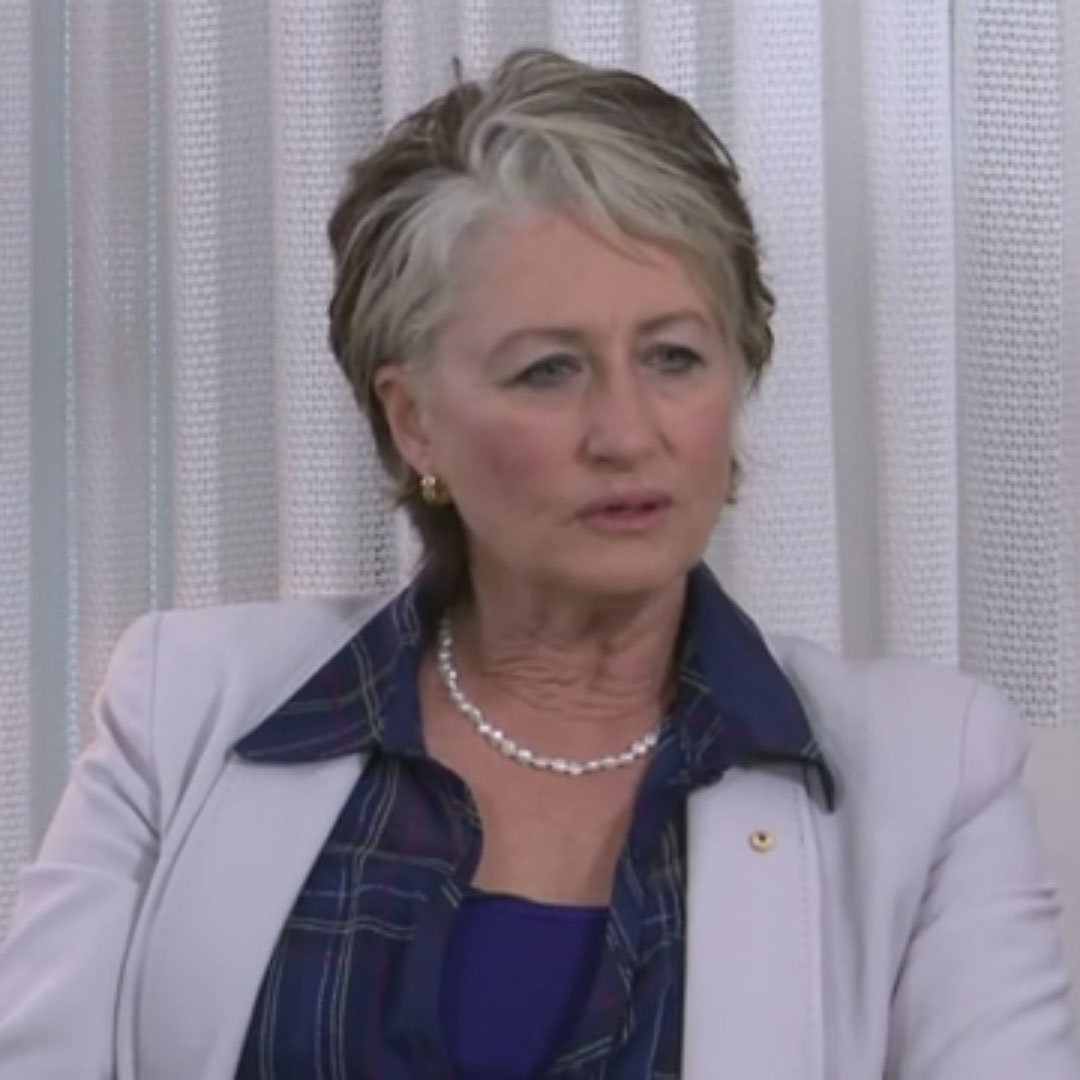

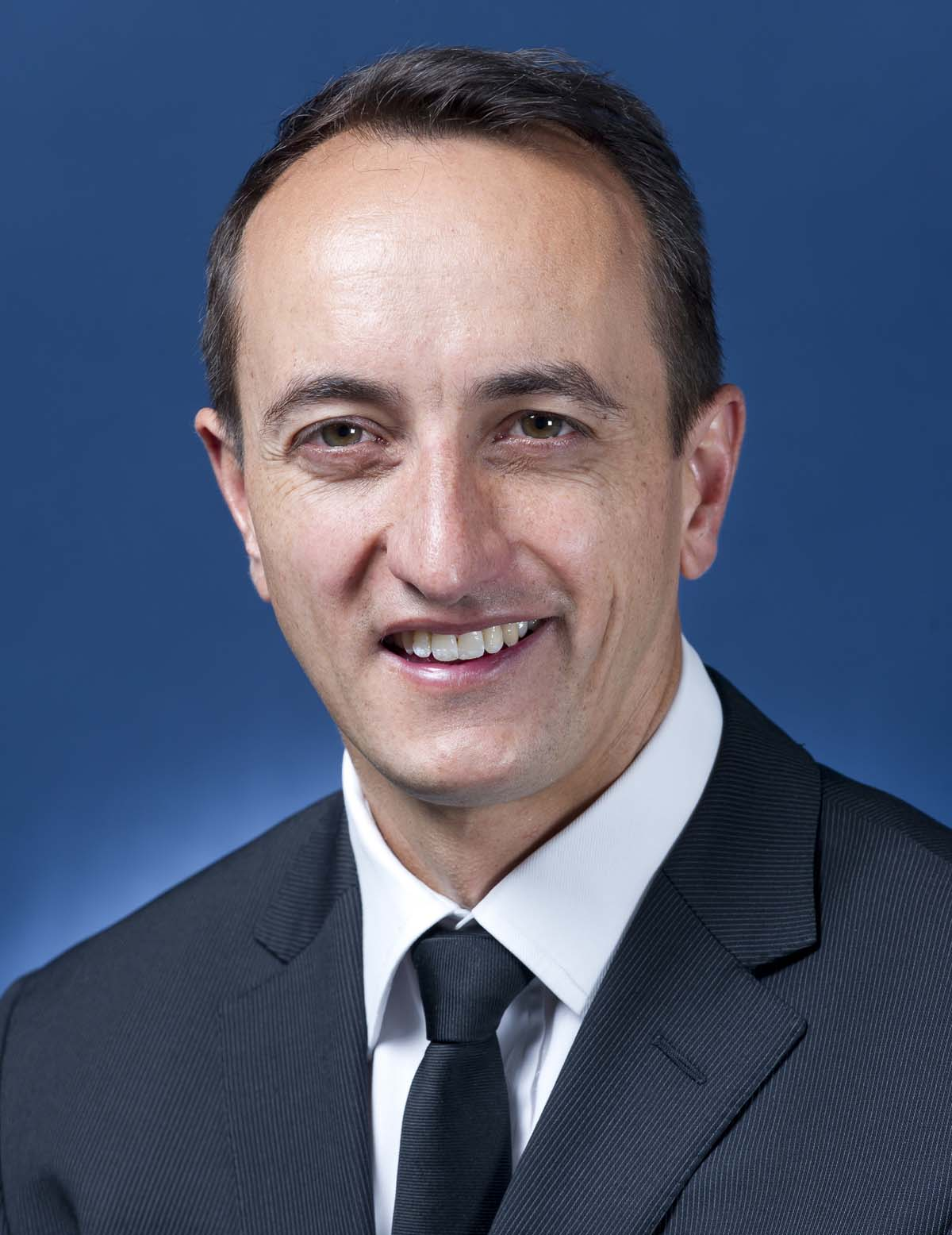

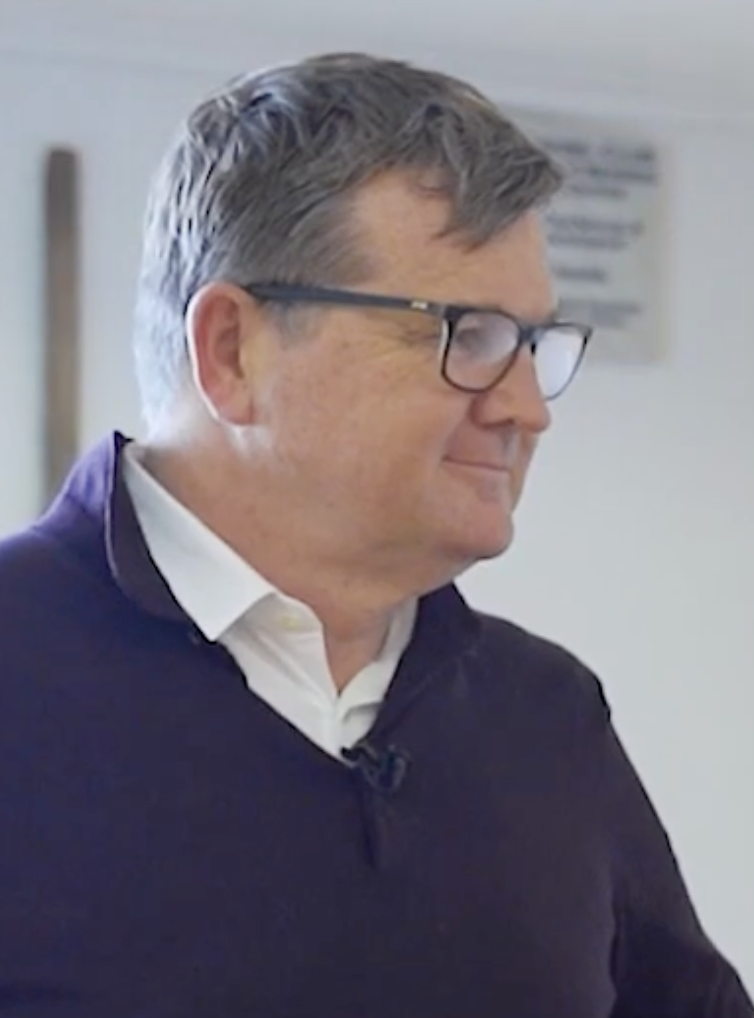
	First party	Second party	Third party
Candidate	Kerryn Phelps	Dave Sharma	Tim Murray
Party	Independent	Liberal	Labor
Primary vote	22,219	32,795	8,777
Percentage	29.19%	43.08%	11.53%
Swing	▲29.19	▼19.18	▼6.20
2CP	51.22%	48.78
2CP swing	▲51.22	▼18.96
- Results by postcode
MP before election
Malcolm Turnbull
Liberal
Elected MP
Kerryn Phelps
Independent

A by-election for the Australian House of Representatives seat of Wentworth took place on 20 October 2018 after the parliamentary resignation of the former Prime Minister of Australia and incumbent Liberal MP Malcolm Turnbull.

The seat was won by independent candidate Kerryn Phelps, with a swing of almost twenty percent away from the Liberal Party. In early counting, just over an hour after the close of polls, the Australian Broadcasting Corporation's election analyst Antony Green predicted Phelps would win the by-election. It was the first time since the inaugural 1901 election that the seat has not been represented by the Liberals, its predecessors, or party defectors.

== Background ==
The Liberal Party of Australia and its predecessors have continuously held Wentworth since the inaugural 1901 election, except for the brief party defections of Walter Marks in 1929 and Peter King in 2004. Wentworth was a stronghold for over 80 years, until the 1984 expansion of parliament and its redistribution saw Wentworth's Liberal margin notionally reduced by 7%, changing Wentworth from a safe Liberal seat with margins usually well in excess of 10%, to a more marginal seat which produced single-digit Liberal margins for the next 25 years. Defeating former Liberal and independent incumbent Peter King, Liberal candidate Malcolm Turnbull first won Wentworth at the 2004 election on a reduced 5.5% Liberal margin, following a 2.4% swing against the national and state trend.

At the change-of-government 2007 election, a redistribution reduced the Liberal margin to a notional 2.5%, but Wentworth was retained with an increased Liberal margin of 3.9% against the national and state trend. Turnbull replaced Brendan Nelson as Liberal leader at the September 2008 Liberal leadership ballot, however Tony Abbott replaced Turnbull as Liberal leader at the December 2009 Liberal leadership ballot. At the 2010 election, the seat went from being marginal to safe in one stroke with a 14.9% margin from an 11% swing which saw the seat become the ninth-safest Liberal seat in the nation. At the change-of-government 2013 election there was a further increase which saw the seat become the sixth-safest Liberal seat in the nation with a 17.72% Liberal margin. Turnbull replaced Abbott as Liberal leader and prime minister at the September 2015 Liberal leadership ballot. A redistribution in Wentworth increased the Liberal margin to a notional 18.9%, however at the 2016 election, a swing away saw the Liberal margin slightly reduced to 17.75% but became the fifth-safest Liberal seat in the nation.

=== Liberal Party leadership spills ===
The by-election came after Scott Morrison replaced Turnbull as Liberal leader and prime minister on 24 August 2018, following the second of two Liberal leadership ballots held that month, which saw Morrison win the ballot against Peter Dutton with 45 votes to 40 after third-placed Julie Bishop was eliminated and the 11 votes she achieved were re-cast in the final two-candidate run-off. Turnbull won the first Liberal leadership ballot against Dutton, which was held three days before the second ballot, by 48 votes to 35. In the secondary spill, Turnbull did not contest the ballot for leader after losing a motion to spill the leadership by 45 votes to 40. Turnbull had previously indicated that he would leave parliament immediately if his party removed him as Liberal leader and prime minister. On 31 August 2018, one week after the second leadership spill, Turnbull submitted his resignation to the Speaker of the House of Representatives.

=== Minority Coalition government ===
Turnbull's departure dropped the Liberal-National Coalition in to minority government, with Nationals MP Kevin Hogan having declared he would move to the crossbench in protest immediately following the second spill. Hogan indicated he would remain a Nationals MP and provide confidence and supply support to the Coalition. Independent Cathy McGowan has indicated that she will not support a motion of no confidence in the Morrison government before the Wentworth by-election has been decided. Rebekha Sharkie stated that she would review her position after the Wentworth by-election.

=== Liberal Party pre-selection ===
The Liberal Party preselected their candidate, Dave Sharma, on 14 September. Other candidates for preselection included: Peter King, barrister and Turnbull's predecessor in Wentworth; Mary-Lou Jarvis, Woollahra councillor; Richard Shields, Woollahra councillor; Katherine O'Regan, Sydney East Business Chamber chair; Michael Feneley, cardiologist; Carrington Brigham, digital campaign business director; and Maxine Szramka, rheumatologist. Christine Forster, City of Sydney councillor and the sister of former Prime Minister Tony Abbott, announced her intention to seek preselection but then withdrew. Preselection front-runner Andrew Bragg, former Acting Federal Director of the Liberal Party and current executive at the Business Council of Australia, withdrew from the preselection contest on 10 September, citing his preference for a female Liberal candidate. Prime Minister Scott Morrison reportedly endorsed O'Regan for preselection, while former prime ministers Turnbull and John Howard endorsed Sharma. Following this, Katherine O'Regan called for the Liberal Party's fighting fund for women to be accessible to women seeking pre-selection.

== Campaign ==
After his resignation, Turnbull left Australia for New York and did not campaign for the Liberal Party's candidate Sharma in the by-election. This decision was criticised by some in the party who had hoped Turnbull would assist in retaining the one-seat parliamentary majority. While in New York, Turnbull told an audience: "When you stop being prime minister, that's it. There is no way I'd be hanging around like embittered Kevin Rudd or Tony Abbott. Seriously, these people are like, sort of miserable, miserable ghosts." At the outset of Liberal preselection, he tweeted support for preselection of candidate Dave Sharma after Morrison had called for a female candidate. On October 18, he liked a tweet favouring Phelps. From New York, Turnbull lobbied his former colleagues to refer his leadership rival Peter Dutton to the High Court over his eligibility to sit in Parliament and tweeting "The point I have made to @ScottMorrisonMP and other colleagues is that given the uncertainty around Peter Dutton's eligibility, acknowledged by the Solicitor General, he should be referred to the High Court, as Barnaby was, to clarify the matter." In September 2018, it was reported that his son Alex Turnbull was supporting the Labor Party at the by-election.

When announcing her campaign, Kerryn Phelps urged voters to "put the Liberals last". She later published how-to-vote cards giving the Liberals a preference above Labor. Phelps became a prominent candidate in the by-election, with it being suggested that her preferences would be able to get Sharma over the line.

During the 2018 Wentworth by-election, after independent candidate Phelps directed her preferences to the Liberal candidate Sharma, the Australian Labor Party (ALP) adopted the strategy of "running dead". They hoped that their candidate, Tim Murray, would secure third place in the election, and that ALP preferences would then be redirected to Phelps to increase her chances of winning the seat.

The Lord Mayor of Sydney, Clover Moore, backed independent candidate Licia Heath, despite having worked with Phelps on the City of Sydney council.

On 26 September 2018 Sharma's campaign team was accused by other candidates of removing their campaign posters and replacing them with Sharma's posters.

On 7 October, The Sunday Telegraph reported allegations that Katter's Australian Party candidate Robert Callanan was a former director of a company associated with a brothel, leading Callanan to be disendorsed by the party.

On 10 October, part of the Ruddock review into religious freedoms in Australia was leaked.

Former Liberal Party leader and former MP for Wentworth John Hewson publicly said the seat is "ripe for protest vote", and urged constituents to vote against the Liberal Party, especially due to its lack of climate change policies.

On 15 October, Scott Morrison announced a review of whether Australia's embassy in Israel should be moved from Tel Aviv to Jerusalem. Morrison also announced funding of $2 million for a surf lifesaving club in the electorate, and $2.2 million for security at Jewish community venues and events.

In the last week of the campaign, an email was sent to hundreds of Wentworth constituents which falsely reported that Phelps was withdrawing from the by-election due to being diagnosed with HIV. The email then encouraged the recipient to give their first preference vote to the Liberal candidate Sharma and to remove Phelps' campaign posters. An investigation into the email revealed that it was likely sent from one of 500,000 Dodo and iPrimus email addresses. Sharma and the Liberal Party condemned the email and denied any involvement.

== Key dates ==
Key dates in relation to the by-election were:

- Monday, 17 September 2018 – Issue of writ
- Monday, 24 September 2018 – Close of electoral rolls (8pm)
- Thursday, 27 September 2018 – Close of nominations (12 noon)
- Friday, 28 September 2018 – Declaration of nominations (12 noon)
- Tuesday, 2 October 2018 – Start of early voting
- Saturday, 20 October 2018 – Polling day (8am to 6pm)
- Friday, 2 November 2018 – Last day for receipt of postal votes
- Wednesday, 26 December 2018 – Last day for return of writs

== Candidates ==
Candidates (16) in ballot paper order
Party	Candidate	Background
Katter's Australian (disendorsed)	Robert Callanan	Treasurer of Sydney United 58 FC. Disendorsed by party after allegations he was a former director of a company associated with a brothel.
Greens	Dominic Wy Kanak	Waverley deputy mayor since 2017 and councillor 1999–2017. Contested Kogarah at the 1999 state election.
Voluntary Euthanasia	Shayne Higson	Head of the party's New South Wales branch. Lead upper house candidate at the 2013 and 2016 federal elections and the 2015 state election.
People	Steven Georgantis	Senior technical officer and other management positions at Australian Tax Office for 31 years.
Labor	Tim Murray	Investment analyst, Tamarama Surf Life Saving Club president, local campaigner.
Justice	Ben Forsyth	Eastern suburbs real estate business owner, victim advocate during the Royal Commission into Institutional Responses to Child Sexual Abuse.
Liberty Alliance	Tony Robinson	Orthopaedic surgeon. Party co-founder. Contested the 2016 federal election, the 2017 Bennelong by-election and the 2018 Perth by-election.
Liberal Democrats	Sam Gunning	Law student. Liberal Democrat North Sydney councillor since 2017.
Liberal	Dave Sharma	Businessman and former public servant. Ambassador to Israel 2013−17.
Independent	Angela Vithoulkas	Entrepreneur and small business advocate. Sydney councillor since 2012.
Animal Justice	Deb Doyle	Book editor and vocational trainer.
Science	Andrea Leong	Research scientist with PhD from the University of New South Wales. Contested Kingsford Smith at the 2016 election.
Independent	Licia Heath	Financial services background, campaigner for increased female representation in politics.
Arts	Barry Keldoulis	Small business owner, local arts figure and CEO of Sydney Contemporary.
Independent	Kerryn Phelps	General practitioner (GP) and former Australian Medical Association (AMA) president. Sydney councillor since 2016 and deputy lord mayor 2016–17.
Sustainable Australia	Kay Dunne	Scientific officer, high school teacher, and senior public servant in strategy & corporate policy.

== Polling ==
Wentworth by-election polling
Date	Firm	Commissioned by	Sample	Primary vote							TPP vote		TCP vote
				LIB	ALP	GRN	Phelps	Heath	OTH	UND	LIB	ALP	LIB	Phelps
15 October 2018	ReachTEL	Greenpeace	661	32.7%	21.6%	9.1%	25.8%	5.6%	3.2%	2.0%	N/A	N/A
6−9 October 2018	Voter Choice	Voter Choice	736	38.8%	17.2%	5.9%	23.5%	7.4%	6.5%	0.8%	44.3%	55.7%	44.6%	55.4%
2 October 2018	uComms/ReachTEL	Refugee Council	870	38.1%	24.5%	8.7%	15.9%	−	12.8%	−	50%	50%	47%	53%
27 September 2018	ReachTEL	Heath	727	40.6%	19.5%	6.2%	16.9%	9.4%	1.8%	5.6%	51%	49%
17 September 2018	ReachTEL	GetUp!	860	35.8%	15.3%	12.6%	20.9%	2.8%	2.9%	9.7%	52%	48%
27 August 2018	ReachTEL	Australia Institute	886	39.6%	29.9%	15.2%	−	−	6.8%	6.3%	50%	50%
2016 election				62.3%	17.7%	14.9%			5.1%		67.7%	32.3%

The first public opinion poll of the by-election, conducted by ReachTEL during the evening of Monday 27 August 2018, produced a tied 50-50 two-party-preferred result between Liberal and Labor, which represented a massive 17.7% swing from Liberal to Labor since the previous election. Election analyst Antony Green partially attributed the size of the swing to the loss of Turnbull's significant personal vote. On 16 October, it was reported that the Liberal party's internal polling showed data that represented a 55% Phelps to 45% Sharma two-candidate-preferred vote result.

== Results ==
2018 Wentworth by-election
Party	Candidate	Votes	%	±%
Liberal	Dave Sharma	32,795	43.08	−19.18
Independent	Kerryn Phelps	22,219	29.19	+29.19
Labor	Tim Murray	8,777	11.53	−6.20
Greens	Dominic Wy Kanak	6,543	8.59	−6.27
Independent	Licia Heath	1,721	2.26	+2.26
Independent	Angela Vithoulkas	822	1.08	+1.08
Science	Andrea Leong	516	0.68	−0.49
Voluntary Euthanasia	Shayne Higson	493	0.65	+0.65
Animal Justice	Deb Doyle	421	0.55	+0.55
Sustainable Australia	Kay Dunne	413	0.54	+0.54
Katter's Australian	Robert Callanan (disendorsed)	381	0.50	+0.50
Liberal Democrats	Samuel Gunning	351	0.46	+0.46
Arts	Barry Keldoulis	305	0.40	−1.36
Liberty Alliance	Tony Robinson	154	0.20	+0.20
Justice	Ben Forsyth	133	0.17	+0.17
People's Party	Steven Georgantis	82	0.11	+0.11
Total formal votes		76,126	93.92	−0.95
Informal votes		4,928	6.08	+0.95
Turnout		81,054	78.13	−8.11
Notional two-party-preferred count
Liberal	Dave Sharma	46,244	60.75	–7.00
Labor	Tim Murray	29,882	39.25	+7.00
Two-candidate-preferred result
Independent	Kerryn Phelps	38,988	51.22	+51.22
Liberal	Dave Sharma	37,138	48.78	−18.96
Independent gain from Liberal		Swing	N/A	

At 7:18pm AEDT, just over an hour after the close of polls, the Australian Broadcasting Corporation's psephologist Antony Green predicted independent candidate Kerryn Phelps to win the by-election, although the margin of victory for Phelps tightened as pre-poll and postal votes were counted.

=== Distribution of preferences ===
2018 Wentworth by-election
Party	Candidate	FPv%	Count														
Party	Candidate	FPv%	1	2	3	4	5	6	7	8	9	10	11	12	13	14	15
Liberal Party of Australia	Dave Sharma	43.08	32,795	32,800	32,825	32,874	32,895	33,057	33,099	33,211	33,262	33,329	33,484	33,780	34,082	34,759	37,138
Independent	Kerryn Phelps	29.19	22,219	22,225	22,244	22,250	22,306	22,331	22,438	22,457	22,520	22,650	22,837	23,084	24,114	27,687	38,988
Australian Labor Party	Tim Murray	11.53	8,777	8,786	8,805	8,811	8,846	8,875	8,902	8,941	8,981	9,047	9,142	9,263	9,605	13,680	
Australian Greens	Dominic Wy Kanak	8.59	6,543	6,552	6,559	6,561	6,631	6,654	6,747	6,935	7,090	7,262	7,469	7,606	8,325		
Independent	Licia Heath	2.26	1,721	1,723	1,729	1,729	1,765	1,780	1,807	1,828	1,864	1,996	2,093	2,393			
Independent	Angela Vithoulkas	1.08	822	834	840	848	861	896	912	947	974	1,009	1,101				
Science Party	Andrea Leong	0.68	516	521	527	530	544	561	610	626	717						
Voluntary Euthanasia Party	Shayne Higson	0.65	493	502	508	513	527	565	594	648	718	833					
Animal Justice Party	Deb Doyle	0.55	421	424	430	432	452	461	512	533							
Sustainable Australia	Kay Dunne	0.54	413	416	420	430	452	460									
Katter's Australian Party	Robert Callanan	0.50	381	388	394	447	451	486	505								
Liberal Democratic Party	Samuel Gunning	0.46	351	355	368	394	396										
Arts Party	Barry Keldoulis	0.40	305	306	307	307											
Australian Liberty Alliance	Tony Robinson	0.20	154	157	170												
Derryn Hinch's Justice Party	Ben Forsyth	0.17	133	137													
Australian People's Party	Steven Georgantis	0.11	82														
Electorate: 103,747 Valid: 76,126 (93.92%) Spoilt: 4,928 (6.08%) Quota: 38,064 (50%+1) Turnout: 81,054 (78.13%)

== Aftermath ==
It is the first time since the inaugural 1901 election that the seat has not been represented by the Liberals, its predecessors, or party defectors. The outcome saw the Liberal–National Coalition slip further into minority government, holding only 74 seats out of 150 in the House of Representatives, having lost majority government two months earlier when Nationals MP Kevin Hogan moved to the crossbench while continuing his confidence and supply support.

The by-election is credited with highlighting the health concerns for refugee children detained in Nauru to the Morrison government's attention, and subsequently transporting some of them to Australia for medical treatment.

As of 2025, this was the most recent time the Katter's Australian Party fielded a candidate outside of Queensland.

== See also ==
- Electoral results for the Division of Wentworth
- 2018 Liberal Party of Australia leadership spills
- List of Australian federal by-elections
