= Results of the 2012 New South Wales local elections in Murray and Far West =

2012 New South Wales local elections in Murray and Far West
← 2008	8 September 2012	2016 → 2017 →

This is a list of local government area results for the 2012 New South Wales local elections in the Murray and Far West regions.

== Central Darling ==
2012 Central Darling Shire Council election
← 2008	8 September 2012	2025 →

All 9 seats on Central Darling Shire Council 5 seats needed for a majority
- Turnout: 858
	First party
	IND
Party	Independents
Last election	9 seats
Seats before	9
Seats won	9
Seat change	Steady
Primary vote
Percentage	100%
Largest party before election
Independents
Largest party after election
Independents

The returning officer was Darren Flowers.

=== Central Darling results ===
Ward	Elected councillor	Party
A	Honor Liversidge	Independent
A	Eamon Sammon	Unaligned
A	Peter Sullivan	Unaligned
B	Denis Standley	Independent
B	Clive Linnett	Unaligned
B	Ray Longfellow	Unaligned
C	Loraine Looney	Unaligned
C	Gary Astill	Unaligned
C	Ron Page	Unaligned

2012 New South Wales local elections: Central Darling Shire
Party	Votes	%	Swing	Seats	Change
Independents & Unaligned	807	100.0		9	Steady
Total formal votes	807	94.1			
Informal votes	51	5.9			
Turnout	858	(Note: 75.1% or 72.3% (conflicting sources))			
Registered voters	(Note: 1,142 or 1,186 (conflicting sources))				

=== Central Darling A Ward ===
2012 New South Wales local elections: Central Darling A Ward
Party	Candidate	Votes	%	±%
Independent	William Murray	38	15.5	
Unaligned	Eamon Sammon (elected 2)	67	27.3	
Unaligned	Peter Sullivan (elected 3)	54	22.0	
Independent	Honor Liversidge (elected 1)	68	27.8	
Independent	William Bates	18	7.4	
Total formal votes		245	96.5	
Informal votes		9	3.5	
Turnout		254	68.5	

=== Central Darling B Ward ===
2012 New South Wales local elections: Central Darling B Ward
Party	Candidate	Votes	%	±%
Unaligned	Clive Linnett (elected 2)	83	28.1	
Unaligned	Ray Longfellow (elected 3)	64	21.7	
Independent	Fay Johnstone	51	17.3	
Independent	Dennis Standley (elected 1)	97	32.9	
Total formal votes		295	95.8	
Informal votes		13	4.2	
Turnout		308	77.8	

=== Central Darling C Ward ===
2012 New South Wales local elections: Central Darling Shire C Ward
Party	Candidate	Votes	%	±%
Independent	Moya Reid	31	11.6	
Unaligned	Gary Astill (elected 2)	84	31.4	
Unaligned	Ron Page (elected 3)	62	23.2	
Unaligned	Loraine Looney (elected 1)	90	33.7	
Total formal votes		267	90.2	
Informal votes		29	9.8	
Turnout		296	78.9	
