= Chiraidongri railway station =

Railway station in Madhya Pradesh, India

General information
- Location: Madhya Pradesh State Highway 11A, Chiraidongri, Madhya Pradesh; India
- Coordinates: 22.411390°N 80.287234°E
- Elevation: 515 metres (1,690 ft)
- System: Indian Railways station
- Owner: Indian Railways
- Operator: South East Central Railway
- Platforms: 2
- Tracks: 2
- Connections: Auto stand

Construction
- Structure type: Standard (on ground station)
- Parking: No
- Cycle facilities: No

Other information
- Station code: CID
- Zone(s): South East Central Railway
- Division(s): Nagpur railway division
Location

Chiraidongri railway station is a small railway station in Mandla district, Madhya Pradesh. Its code is CID. It serves Chiraidongri village. The station consists of two platforms. The platforms are not well sheltered. It lacks many facilities including water and sanitation. Chiraidongri was served by a narrow-gauge railway from Mandla Fort to Nainpur. Currently the section between Nainpur and Mandla Fort have been fully converted to Electrified Broadgauge line. From Nainpur Junction, the line connects to the fully converted Jabalpur–Gondia railway line, from narrow gauge to broad gauge. It is the nearest railway station from Kanha Tiger Reserve Mandla
