= Mandla (name) =

Mandla is a South African name that may refer to

- Mandla Langa (born 1950), South African poet, short story writer, and novelist
- Mandla Mandela (born 1974), South African chief of the Mvezo Traditional Council, grandson of Nelson Mandela
- Mandla Masango (born 1989), South African football midfielder
- Mandla Mofokeng (born 1967), South African musician, singer and producer
- Mandla Ndlovu (born 1969), South African politician
- Mandla Zwane (born 1973), South African football player
- Edward Mandla (born 1963), Australian politician and businessman
