= Kerryn Phelps =

Australian doctor and politician (born 1957)

Kerryn Phelps AM
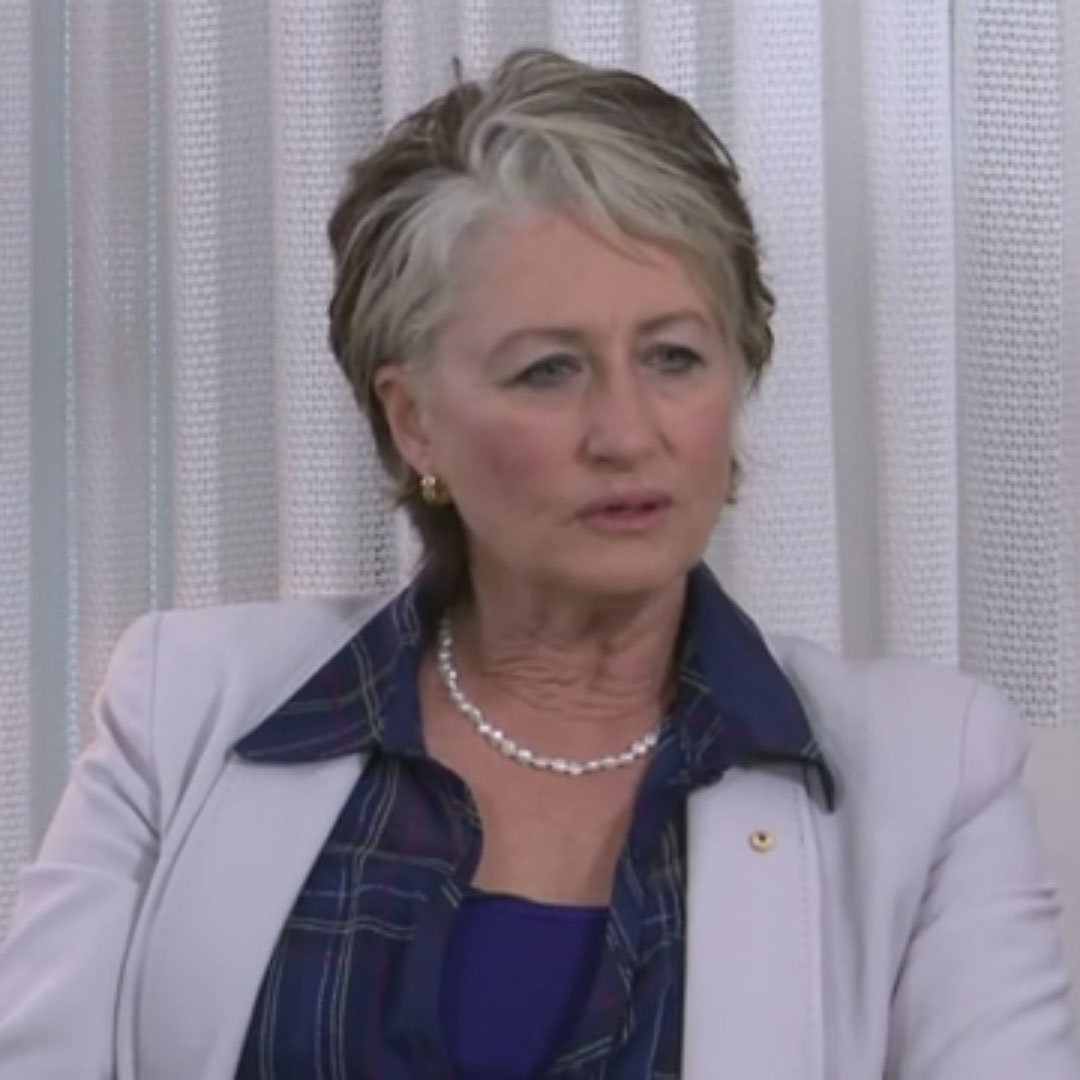
- Phelps in 2012

Member of the Australian Parliament for Wentworth
- In office 20 October 2018 – 18 May 2019
- Preceded by: Malcolm Turnbull
- Succeeded by: Dave Sharma

Councillor of the City of Sydney
- In office 10 September 2016 – 4 December 2021

Deputy Lord Mayor of Sydney
- In office 23 September 2016 – 18 September 2017
- Lord Mayor: Clover Moore
- Preceded by: Irene Doutney
- Succeeded by: Jess Miller

Personal details
- Born: Kerryn Lyndel Phelps; 14 December 1957 (age 68) Sydney, Australia
- Party: Clover Moore Independents (2016–2017); Independent (2017–present); Kerryn Phelps Independents (2018–2021)
- Spouse(s): Michael Fronzek (Divorced 1993); Jackie Stricker (1998–present)
- Children: 3
- Relatives: Peter Phelps (brother)
- Education: University of Sydney
- Website: drkerrynphelps.com.au

Kerryn Lyndel Phelps AM (born 14 December 1957) is an Australian medical practitioner, public health and civil rights advocate, medical educator and former politician.

She was the first woman and first openly LGBT person to be elected president of the Australian Medical Association (AMA). In 2001, she was awarded the Centenary Medal for services to health and medicine. In 2011, she was appointed a Member of the Order of Australia for her service to medicine, particularly through leadership roles with the AMA, education and community health, and as a general practitioner. She is Conjoint Professor in the National Institute of Complementary Medicine at the Western Sydney University.

Phelps was elected to the Council of the City of Sydney on 10 September 2016 as a member of the Clover Moore Independents Team, and was then appointed as Deputy Lord Mayor of the council. She resigned as Deputy on 26 June 2017 and is now an independent politician.

On 16 September 2018, Phelps announced she would run as an independent candidate in the 2018 Wentworth by-election, occasioned by the resignation from Parliament of Malcolm Turnbull following his removal as Prime Minister. She was elected with a majority of 1,851 votes (1.2 points in two-party-preferred terms), constituting a 19-point swing in what had been a safe Liberal seat, and was the first independent candidate to win the federal seat of Wentworth. However, on 20 May 2019, she was defeated in the 2019 federal election by the Liberal candidate Dave Sharma.

Phelps is also a keen sportswoman, and in 2014, was appointed to the board of Hockey Australia.

She is also an ambassador for Barnardos Australia.

== Early life ==
Phelps was born at Manly Hospital on 14 December 1957, and grew up in the Pittwater region of Sydney. Her father, George, was a refrigeration mechanic, and her mother, Shirley Phelps OAM, was a Councillor for Pittwater Council (1995–2002) and Deputy Mayor (1996–1997). Shirley Phelps was a recipient of the Medal of the Order of Australia (OAM) in 2013 and George Phelps was a recipient of the Medal of the Order of Australia (OAM) in 2002.

== Professional life ==
Phelps graduated from the University of Sydney in 1981 and completed postgraduate training at the Royal North Shore Hospital in Sydney, and at the Royal Australian College of General Practitioners. She started working in health communications in the mainstream media in 1985, bringing messages about healthy lifestyle to the attention of the general public. Her television credits include EveryBody, Good Morning Australia, the Today Show, a documentary on the Kokoda Track campaign and Last Chance Surgery. She has been the subject of stories on 60 Minutes, Australian Story and This Is Your Life. Phelps has presented a variety of health and fitness programs on radio and has been a regular newspaper and magazine columnist. In 1992, she was a regular on the sex education program Sex on the Nine Network.

In 1999, Phelps was elected president of the New South Wales branch of the Australian Medical Association (AMA). The following year she was elected federal president of the AMA, where she served the maximum term of three years. Some of her more significant successes involved working with Australian State and Federal Governments on resolving an emerging medical indemnity crisis. The unresolved medical insurance issue threatened obstetrics and neurosurgery in particular, and was exacerbated by escalating medical malpractice claims. She was also instrumental in establishing an advisory committee on Indigenous health in Australia, and promoting debate on the importance of the public health system in response to the bioterrorism threat. Phelps' major areas of interest included integrative medicine, public health, and human rights issues. As AMA President, she convened an expert advisory committee and pioneered the AMA's first position statement on complementary medicine. She was also the first AMA President to publicly state the effects of climate change on public health, and raised awareness of issues such as Aboriginal health problems, and the medical workforce shortage.

Phelps's time as AMA president was marked by a public clash with the federal Minister for Health, Michael Wooldridge. He publicly claimed that she had no specialist medical qualifications. In rebuttal, Phelps contended that general practice is itself a medical specialty. After the Prime Minister, John Howard intervened to broker a truce, the minister still refused to apologise for his remarks. In an interview on PM, the minister eventually issued a public apology.

While President of AMA Phelps was also chairperson of pink media and property company Satellite Group. She resigned as chairperson of the troubled company in August 2000.

Between 2009 and 2012, Phelps was President of the Australasian Integrative Medicine Association. She is founder and principal clinician at Sydney Integrative Medicine and Cooper Street Clinic in Sydney and Conjoint Professor in the National Institute of Complementary Medicine at the Western Sydney University. She is a regular speaker to health professionals and the general public on health and well-being, as well as leadership and strategy for professional organisations. She has been the health writer for The Australian Women's Weekly since 1991. She is a regular commentator on general practice, public health, medical politics and human rights issues.

Phelps is the co-author, with Craig Hassed, of the textbook The Integrative Approach published in 2010; and has published on general wellness, cancer and on a range of other general health and health communication issues.

== Local government politics ==
Phelps was an independent Councillor for the City of Sydney until December 2021.

Elected to the Council of the City of Sydney on 10 September 2016 as a member of the Clover Moore Independent Team, Phelps was elected Deputy Lord Mayor of the council. However, membership of the Clover Moore team was short-lived. Phelps resigned to sit as an independent from 27 June 2017, after being told by Moore that she would not support Phelps' bid to continue as deputy lord mayor.

== Federal politics ==
Phelps ran as an independent candidate in the 2018 Wentworth by-election. When announcing her campaign, she urged voters to "put the Liberals last". She later published how-to-vote cards giving the Liberals a higher preference than Labor. Phelps became a prominent candidate in the by-election and has stated that her campaign cost around $300,000. Reports suggested that, if Phelps won, she might provide confidence and supply to the government.

Phelps stated that, if elected, she would continue as a member of the City of Sydney Council and to work as a GP; she said that she has received legal advice that these would not disqualify her under Constitution section 44(iv) and (v) respectively, although she has refused to release the advice.

On 5 November, she was declared elected with a majority of 1,851 votes (1.2 points in two-candidate-preferred terms), constituting a 19-point swing in what had been a safe Liberal seat. She immediately stated that she would seek an urgent briefing on possible referral of Minister for Home Affairs Peter Dutton and Liberal MP Chris Crewther to the High Court under Constitution s 44(v).

Upon getting elected Phelps became the seventh Jew serving concurrently in parliament, the most since federation.

Phelps was sworn in as a member of parliament on 26 November 2018. Upon arriving in Parliament, she proposed amendments to government legislation which gave greater authority to doctors to allow the medical evacuation of asylum seekers to Australia from Nauru and Manus Island. The government, which did not have a majority on the floor of either the House of Representatives or Senate, opposed the amendments. Phelps' amendments were able to pass the parliament with the support of the Labor Party, Greens and most of the other crossbenchers in the House. Human rights advocates hailed the legislation, with one reflecting on its passage a "tipping point as a country", in relation to the treatment of refugees and asylum seekers.

On 20 May 2019, Phelps conceded defeat in the 2019 federal election to the Liberal candidate Dave Sharma.

== Kerryn Phelps Independents ==
Kerryn Phelps Independents
- Leader: Kerryn Phelps
- Founded: 15 September 2018
- Registered: 2019
- Dissolved: 22 July 2021
- Sydney City Council: 1 / 10 (2018–2021)
- House of Representatives (Note: While Phelps was a member of Kerryn Phelps Independents, she was elected and sat as an independent.): 1 / 150 (2018–2019)

Kerryn Phelps Independents was a political party formed by Phelps in 2018.

The party's name was first mentioned when Phelps directed a reporter from The Weekend Australian to a man whose voicemail said he worked for 'Kerryn Phelps Independents'.

After her election loss in 2019, it was reported Phelps applied to register a party under that name. The party was deregistered by the NSW Electoral Commission in 2021, having never competed at a local, state or federal election.

== Personal life ==
Phelps is married to Jackie Stricker-Phelps, a former primary school teacher. They were united in a religious ceremony in New York on 4 January 1998, and later returned to New York City in 2011 for a legal marriage. Phelps converted to Judaism when the couple married.

From her first marriage with Michael Fronzek, Phelps has a daughter and a son. Phelps and Stricker-Phelps have an adopted daughter, and were the first same-sex non-kin couple to adopt a child in NSW. Phelps has a younger brother, Australian TV actor Peter Phelps.

In 2009, Phelps was named one of the 25 most influential lesbians in Australia by readers of the website samesame.com.au. During the Australian Marriage Law Postal Survey period, Phelps appeared in an advertisement for the "Yes" campaign, and was a high-profile figure in the debate.

In December 2022, Phelps said that she and her wife suffered from injuries related to the COVID-19 vaccine.

== Honours ==
Phelps was awarded the Centenary Medal in 2001 for service to Australian society and medicine. On 13 June 2011, she was appointed a Member of the Order of Australia for her services to medicine, particularly through leadership roles with the Australian Medical Association in education and community health, and as a general practitioner.

In 2008 Phelps, a proponent of integrative medicine, was awarded a Bent Spoon Award by the Australian Skeptics for lending her name to a clinic offering various unproven "alternative" remedies.

Phelps and Stricker-Phelps have been ambassadors for Barnardos Australia's Mother of the Year Award since 2013.

In 2014, Phelps was awarded a Doctor of Letters honoris causa by the University of Western Sydney.

In October 2019 she was named winner of the Public Policy category in The Australian Financial Review's 100 Women of Influence awards in recognition of her efforts in advocating for asylum-seeker health and lobbying Parliament for the Medevac law.

In February 2020, it was announced she would be the NSW award winner of the Australian Award for Excellence in Women's Leadership for her leadership on issues of city governance, inclusiveness, social justice and community wellbeing.

== Selected published works ==
- Phelps, Kerryn (1993). Sex : confronting sexuality. Harper Collins Publishers. p. 192. ISBN 978-0732249748.
- Phelps, Kerryn; Hassed, Craig, eds. (2011). General practice : the integrative approach. Chatswood: Elsevier Australia. p. 993. ISBN 978-0729538046.
- Phelps, Kerryn (2013). Ultimate wellness : the 3-step plan. Sydney: Pan Macmillan. p. 322. ISBN 978-1742611921.
- Phelps, Kerryn (2015). The cancer recovery guide : getting your life back. South Melbourne: Macmillan Australia. ISBN 978-1743538623.

== Notes ==
Parliament of Australia
Preceded by Malcolm Turnbull	Member for Wentworth; 2018–2019	Succeeded by Dave Sharma
Civic offices
Preceded by Irene Doutney	Deputy Lord Mayor of Sydney; 2016–2017	Succeeded by Jess Miller
