= Edward Mandla =

Australian politician and businessman

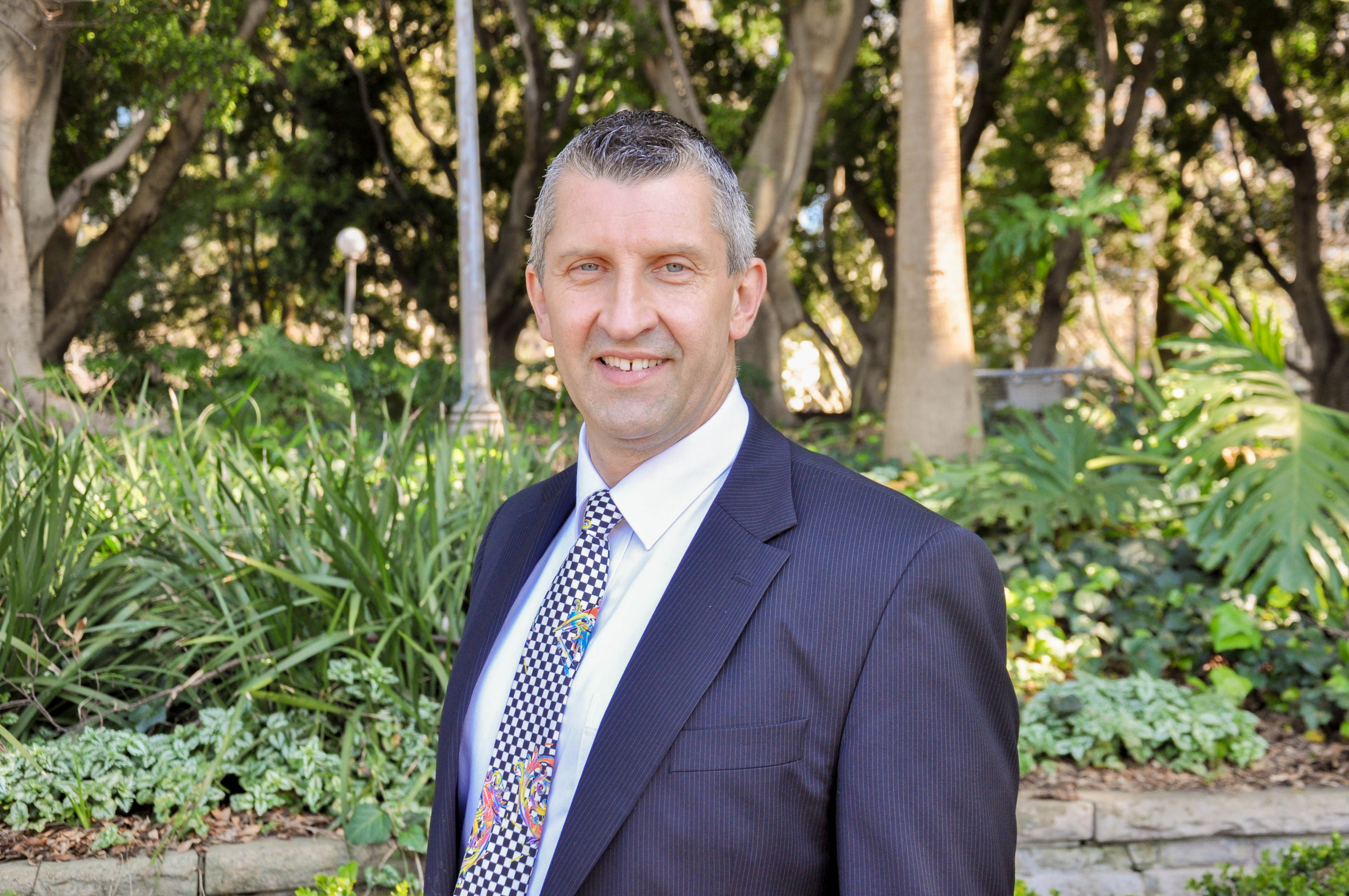

City of Sydney Councillor
- In office 2012–2016

Personal details
- Party: Liberal Party

Edward Mandla (born 1963) is an Australian politician and businessman. He was a Councillor for the City of Sydney from 2012 to 2016. His business career spans over two decades in the information technology and executive search industries. He is a former president of the Australian Computer Society and currently sits on the board of directors of several companies and organizations.

== Background ==
Mandla attended the University of New South Wales where he received a First Class Honours Degree in Commerce. He was awarded the first University Medal for Outstanding Academic Achievement in Information Systems and won the Datec Prize for his thesis on information systems techniques used for commercial applications.

== Business ==
Mandla is the founder and general manager of Mandlason Search, a recruitment and executive search firm. He is on the Advisory Boards of tech company Seventeenhundred, custom software development house Solentive, online dress retailer White Runway and fire safety solutions business Concept Safety Systems. He is a former president of the Australian Computer Society, an association for technology professionals with over 22,000 members. The association made him an Honorary Life Member in 2007. Mandla has also written columns for The Australian, The Sydney Morning Herald, The Age and The Daily Telegraph.

== Political career ==
In 2007, Mandla ran as the Liberal candidate for the seat of Sydney in the New South Wales state election. He lost to incumbent Clover Moore but beat the Greens and Labor, providing the Liberal Party with its best result in twenty years. He was the President of the Sydney City Branch of the Liberal Party from 2009 until he left the party in 2016.

=== City of Sydney Councillor, 2012–2016 ===
In July 2012, Mandla was preselected by the Liberal Party for its City of Sydney mayoral candidate over Christine Forster, sister to former Prime Minister (at the time, Federal opposition leader) Tony Abbott. Mandla and Forster positioned themselves as an effective opposition to Lord Mayor Moore, who they claimed was concentrating too much on her vision of a "Sustainable Sydney" while losing track of practical problems, such as parking. The party promised to decrease rates by 10% for businesses and residents, which would be funded by cutting capital spending by 250 million and making significant cuts to the council's 1,700 full-time staff. On 8 September 2012, Moore was reelected Lord Mayor for her third term; however, Mandla received the second-highest number of votes, ensuring him the number two spot on the nine-person council. Since taking office Councillor Mandla has challenged a number of Moore's policies.

=== Renewable energy ===
Mandla has called on the council to revise its target for a 70 percent greenhouse reduction by 2030, saying it's no longer achievable and is "misleading to the public." He argued that the plan to roll out tri-generation power plants across the city was extremely complex and could leave ratepayers paying hundreds of millions of dollars. He stressed that this was an ambitious scheme for the council to undertake and that exceptional risk and project management were necessary. He suggested the council evaluate gas price uncertainty and to consider alternatives. Plans to construct a tri-generation plant at Green Square were eventually halted in June 2013 due to financial risk.

=== Parking ===
Mandla aims to end what he has described as Sydney's "hatred of car ownership". He has called for new housing developments to include at least one car space for each apartment. He is also an advocate for 15-minute free parking throughout the city, which would benefit locals and promote what he described as "park local, buy local".

=== Wild fires ===
In 2013, when wild fires destroyed hundreds of homes in New South Wales, Mandla convinced the council to increase its contribution to the Australian Red Cross NSW Disaster Relief from $100,000 to $200,000. He also criticised the green movement for cutting down on back burning, which in turn contributed to the damaging wild fire, and accused Moore of turning a speech on bush fire into a political statement on global warming.

=== Business voting rights ===
In September 2014, the NSW state Parliament passed a bill granting businesses two votes while also making business voting compulsory. Mandla was instrumental in getting the bill passed. He had been a proponent of business voting rights, arguing that businesses provided the bulk of rate revenues – about 80 percent – but were effectively denied a vote. Previously, business voting was voluntary, but turnout was low and discouraged by an unwieldy system of yearly enrolment. Mandla worked with Shooters MP Robert Borsak to help draft the bill, which was passed in September 2014 and was to take effect in the 2016 elections.

=== Parking Rangers investigation ===
Following the death of a whistleblower, Mandla pressured Mayor Moore to release the full details of a secret investigation into allegations of bullying and harassment within Sydney's parking ranger unit. In May 2015 the whistleblower emailed Ms. Moore, City of Sydney CEO Monica Barone, and other officials to highlight plunging morale among colleagues, deteriorating mental health, high sick leave and staff turnover. Four weeks later the whistleblower died of a suspected suicide. The council knew of the misconduct allegations since at least 2012 when City of Sydney ordered an investigation into allegations of "bullying, harassment, coercion and intimidation". Councilor Mandla demanded Moore publicly release the results of the 2012 internal report and step aside until a full investigation be completed.

=== 2016 Sydney elections ===
In November 2015, Mandla announced that he would not run for Lord Mayor, citing the demands of his five board director roles and the upcoming birth of his seventh child as the reasons behind his decision. At the time he was presumed to be the frontrunner on the Liberal Party's ticket. In July 2016, Mandla left the Liberal Party to run as the second candidate on independent councilor Angela Vithoulkas "Sydney Matters" ticket in the September 2016 council elections. Upon his exit from the party, Mandla was critical of the Liberals for being beholden to lobbyists and unelected officials. Vithoulkas and Mandla will contest incumbent Lord Mayor Clover Moore and Liberal candidate Christine Forster.

== Outside of politics ==
Mandla weightlifts competitively for the NSW's Titans. He won Masters Division Championships in 2012, 2013, 2017, 2019 and currently holds the NSW Masters Division record for the snatch, clean and jerk and total. He won bronze at the World Cup in 2017. He holds a number of current Australian Masters records in the 55-59 102 kg category including snatch 90 kg, clean and jerk 108 kg, and total 194 kg.

== Personal life ==
He is married and has six children.
