= Mandla Fort railway station =

Railway station in Madhya Pradesh, India

General information
- Location: Maharajpur Mandla, Madhya Pradesh; India
- Coordinates: 22.5869°N 80.3563°E
- Elevation: 108 metres (354 ft)
- System: Indian Railways station
- Owner: Indian Railways
- Operator: South East Central Railway
- Line: Jabalpur–Balaghat–Gondia line
- Platforms: 2
- Tracks: 4
- Connections: Auto stand

Construction
- Structure type: Standard (on-ground station)
- Parking: No
- Cycle facilities: No

Other information
- Status: Functioning
- Station code: MFR
- Zone(s): South East Central Railway
- Division(s): Nagpur railway division
Location

Mandla Fort railway station is a main railway station in Mandla district, Madhya Pradesh. Its code is MFR. It serves Mandla city. The station consists of two platforms. The platforms are now well sheltered. Mandla was served by a narrow-gauge railway from Nainpur, where it connects to the narrow-gauge line between Jabalpur and Gondia. Gauge conversion has already completed.
