= Irene Doutney =

Australian politician

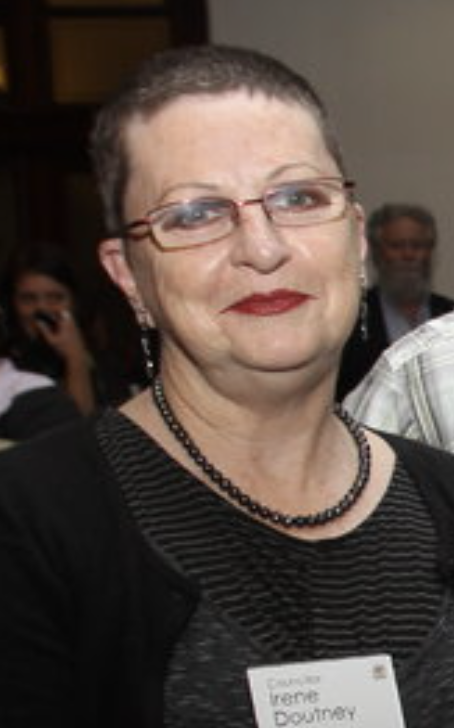

Deputy Lord Mayor of Sydney
- In office 29 February 2016 – 10 September 2016
- Lord Mayor: Clover Moore
- Preceded by: Robyn Kemmis
- Succeeded by: Kerryn Phelps

Councillor of the City of Sydney
- In office 13 September 2008 – 10 September 2016

Personal details
- Born: 1949/50 Kings Cross, New South Wales, Australia
- Died: 11 June 2018 (aged 69) Darlinghurst, New South Wales, Australia
- Party: Greens New South Wales

Irene Doutney (1949/50 – 11 June 2018) was an Australian politician, who was a councillor of the City of Sydney for the Greens New South Wales. In 2016, she became Deputy Lord Mayor of Sydney.

== Early life ==
Doutney grew up in King's Cross, Australia. Her father died of leukemia when she was 9 years old. Starting at age 12, Doutney battled depression. Her mother was diagnosed with terminal cancer when Doutney was 16. She earned a Bachelor of Arts degree in history.

== Career ==
Doutney became involved in community issues through the group REDWatch. She was first elected as a Greens councillor to the City of Sydney in 2008, and ran for both mayor and council at the 2012 Sydney City Council election. Doutney came fifth in the mayoral race with 6.5%, but was successful in being re-elected to council. On 29 February 2016, the Sydney Council elected Doutney the new Deputy Lord Mayor following the death of Robyn Kemmis. The election followed an agreement between Green Councillor Doutney and Independent Lord Mayor Clover Moore that Doutney would support Moore's budgetary measures but remain free to object to other proposals.

One of Doutney's signature issues as a public official was advocating for improved public housing. Her first act as an elected councilor was to speak out against the Northern Territory intervention for the Aboriginal rights Coalition.

Doutney was a "78er", having participated in the first Sydney Gay and Lesbian Mardi Gras in 1978, and continued to advocate for marriage equality and LGBT rights. Along with Labor councillor Linda Scott, Doutney was among the first City of Sydney councillors to push for the City to divest from fossil fuels. She advocated for urban forest, leading the City of Sydney adopting the Greening Sydney strategy. In 2016, she announced she would not contest the September 2016 elections for the City of Sydney.

== Death ==
Doutney died on 11 June 2018 at the St Vincents Sacred Heart Hospice after a 3-year battle with cancer.
