= Linda Scott (councillor) =

Australian politician

Councillor Linda Scott

Deputy Lord Mayor of Sydney
- In office 17 September 2018 – 9 September 2019
- Lord Mayor: Clover Moore
- Preceded by: Jess Miller
- Succeeded by: Jess Scully

Councillor of the City of Sydney
- In office 8 September 2012 – 14 September 2024

Personal details
- Party: Labor
- Website: www.lindascott.org.au Archived 15 October 2024 at the Wayback Machine

Linda Scott is a former Labor Party councillor on the City of Sydney Council, first elected in 2012 and re-elected in 2016 and 2021. She served as Deputy Lord Mayor between September 2018 and September 2019. She retired in 2024.

In November 2020, Scott was elected unopposed as the president of the Australian Local Government Association, having been vice president since November 2018 and a board member since 2017.

Scott served on the National Federation Reform Council with Australia's prime minister, premiers and treasurers, and a range of National Cabinet subcommittees.

Scott previously served as the first female president of Local Government NSW from 2017 to 2021.

== Local Government career ==
Scott won Labor's first community preselection as Labor's candidate for Lord Mayor of the City of Sydney in the 2012 New South Wales local government elections.

She has campaigned for the preservation of and increase in inner city green spaces and burying cables underground to enable more kerbside space to plant more trees. She is a supporter of public amenities. Scott has campaigned for greater housing affordability and for those in public housing.

Scott moved to have signage identifying Aboriginal and Torres Strait heritage names installed across the City of Sydney. Scott also opposed the sale of heritage public housing in Millers Point, Dawes Point and The Rocks, and campaigned to preserve industrial heritage.

Scott has argued for significant investment in new early education centres, more before-and-after-school care and public libraries. Scott also supported a campaign to build a giant rainbow flag in recognition of the LGBT community in Sydney's Taylor Square, which saw the permanent monument erected in 2012. Scott is a supporter of live music and street art.

In December 2017, Scott was elected to succeed Keith Rhoades as President of Local Government NSW, becoming the first female and first Labor president of the organisation since the merger of the Local Government Association and the Local Shires Association in 2013.

On 17 September 2018, Scott was elected to serve a single term as Deputy Lord Mayor.

She retired at the local government election in 2024.

== Board career ==
Since her retirement from local government, Scott has pursued a career as a professional board director. She serves as the chair of the superannuation fund CareSuper, having served as director since 2018. She also serves as a chair and non-executive director on ASX-listed companies, charities and New South Wales and federal boards.

In December 2024, Scott was appointed as a Trustee of the Museums of Applied Arts and Sciences.
