= Angela Vithoulkas =

Australian politician and businesswoman

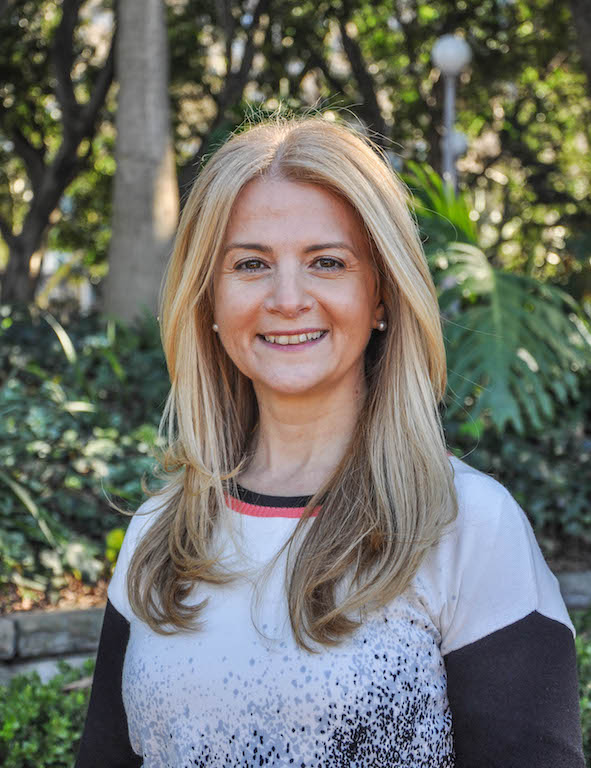
- Vithoulkas in 2016

Councillor of the City of Sydney
- In office 8 September 2012 – 4 December 2021

Personal details
- Born: 17 June 1966 (age 60) Liverpool, NSW
- Party: Small Business (2017-2021)
- Other political affiliations: The Living Sydney Team (2012–2016); Sydney Matters Independent Team (2016–2017)
- Website: Official website

Angela Vithoulkas (born 17 June 1966) is a former Australian politician, business owner and media personality. She served as a Councillor of the City of Sydney from 2012 to 2021, being re-elected in 2016. She has owned and operated VIVO Cafe for over 25 years, established Eagle Waves Radio, and was elected Deputy Chairperson of the City of Sydney Economic Development and Business Sub-Committee. Vithoulkas makes regular public and media appearances as an advocate for small businesses in the City of Sydney.

== Early life and education ==
Vithoulkas is the daughter of Greek Migrants to Australia. She is one of two siblings that owned and operated the now closed, VIVO cafe in the Sydney CBD. Vithoulkas left school in year 11 to go into the family business with her brother Con Vithoulkas, who she has been in business with ever since. She has owned and sold 17 businesses, largely hospitality based.

== Vivo Cafe ==
VIVO Cafe is located on George Street, in Sydney CBD. The café is owned and operated by Vithoulkas and Con Vithoulkas. In 2005, VIVO Cafe won the City of Sydney Cafe of the year award, presented by Lord Mayor Clover Moore. 2 years later, Vithoulkas was awarded the 2007 Telstra NSW Business Owner Award.

As a business owner in the City of Sydney, Vithoulkas has appeared in the media regularly to voice the concerns of the business community to local issues like parking, smoking regulations, Sydney Light Rail developments and the introduction of the City of Sydney's business voting. Vithoulkas has also published opinion pieces in the Sydney Morning Herald and the Daily Telegraph.

== Eagle Waves Radio ==
In 2013, Vithoulkas launched Eagles Waves radio as a digital radio station dedicated to small business matters in Sydney. The station claimed the title of "Australia's first and only radio station dedicated to empowering small businesses". The studio is located inside of Vithoulkas' VIVO cafe.

In 2016, Vithoulkas relaunched Eagle Waves Radio with her own podcast, 'The Brew with Angela Vithoulkas'. The audio-visual podcast series explores the lives and journeys of successful Australians.

== Political career ==
In 2012, Vithoulkas ran as an independent in the City of Sydney, as part of the Living Sydney. She was re-elected in 2016 for a further 4 years as part of the Sydney Matters Team. At the 2021 local government elections, Vithoulkas ran as part of the Small Business Party but was unsuccessful in her bid for a third term on the council.

=== Living Sydney, 2012–14 ===
In 2012, Vithoulkas was approached by real estate agent and former campaign manager to Lord Mayor Clover Moore, Barry Goldman to run for public office as part of the Living Sydney Independent party. Mr Goldman established the team due to frustrations with Clover Moore's council's inaction for business and transport reforms, including controversial reforms to the business voting laws of Sydney. The 8-week campaign for City of Sydney Council was almost entirely personally funded by Vithoulkas, resulting in her election as a City of Sydney Councillor.

Vithoulkas and the Sydney Living party was endorsed by the Consumer's and Tax Payer's association and media personality Alan Jones – however the party denied any link the organisation, likely due to their anti-carbon tax stance.

The Living Sydney team received 8.4% of the vote for councillor (5524 total votes) and Vithoulkas received 9.8% of Lord Mayoral votes (6722 total votes).

=== Independent (2014–2016) ===
In 2014, Vithoulkas left the Living Sydney party citing its links to the liquor and gambling industry publicly. At the time of leaving the party, Vithoulkas was the only contact on the website and made up the bulk of the sites' content – suggesting that the party had largely been dismantled after the election. Vithoulkas remained from 2014 – 2016 as an independent councillor in the City of Sydney.

=== Sydney Matters Independent Team (2016–2017) ===
Towards the end of Ms Vithoulkas' first tenure as a City of Sydney councillor, she established the Sydney Matters team to run in the 2016 City of Sydney local elections. It was believed that both Vithoulkas as a business leader and Liberal Candidate Christine Forster would be an increased threat to incumbent Clover Moore due to the introduction of compulsory non-residential voting for businesses. The changes to business voting in the local government area were a controversial change, with much of council vowing to remove the amendments if elected.

In early August, former Liberal Mayoral Candidate, and Liberal Party member Edward Mandla joined the Sydney Matters team claiming that the Liberal party had 'lost its way'. Attracted by the independence afforded by being an independent politician, Mandla became the second the Sydney Matters ticket and ensured that Christine Forster would run as the Liberal candidate. The Sydney Matters Independent team also notably included Chinese immigration lawyer Grace Zou, founder of online publication start-up Daily Mat Beeche, and fitness blogger Lorraine Chung.

Notable campaign platforms for the Sydney Matters team included the suggestion to build a tunnel underneath Oxford St, the introduction of free wifi for City of Sydney residents and the introduction of a Night Mayor as seen other cities, most notably Amsterdam.

==== Night Mayor proposal ====
A major lynch pin of the Sydney Matters 2016 campaign was a proposal for a "Night-Mayor" in the [City of Sydney]. In 2014, the NSW Government introduced legislation, coined the lockout laws, aimed at decreasing alcohol related violence following a series of assaults in Sydney's King's Cross district. As a response, Vithuolkas' party publicly called for the introduction of a "night-mayor" as seen in international cities. The Success of Amsterdam's night mayor, Mirik Milan has been help up as a case study of what is possible for comparable cities. The proposal received traction in major news outlets including the Sydney Morning Herald and wide-ranging support from public figures, most notably Justin Hemmes and the Keep Sydney open group.

==== Target of Sexism ====
Two days before election day, the Sydney Morning Herald published a series of "disparaging and sexist" remarks made by Edward Mandla in an email to Liberal party staff about Vithoulkas.

==== Election result ====
Incumbent Clover Moore had a resounding victory in the 2016 City of Sydney local government election and was returned to office alongside 5 members of the Clover Moore Team. Vithoulkas was returned as an Independent Councillor, securing 7.35% of the vote as councillor (6051 total votes). She also received 7.74% of the vote as Mayoral candidate (6432 total votes). No other Sydney Matters candidates were elected.

=== Light rail campaigning ===
Vithoulkas has been at the forefront of campaigns to compensate businesses impeded by construction of the CBD and South East Light Rail in the Sydney CBD. Vithoulkas' own business, VIVO Café, has been hindered by the constructions on George St.

In early August 2017, Vithoulkas hosted a business resident action meeting for those affected by the light rail. The meeting was supported and addressed by veteran broadcaster Alan Jones, who has also been critical of the constructions. Over 100 business owners and residents attended the meeting and it received considerable media attention.

In late August 2017, after 2 years of campaigning, the NSW State Government announced it would award rent relief to businesses that were negatively affected by Light Rail construction. Vithoulkas was critical of the time taken for the Government to act on the issue, saying it was "too little too late" for many businesses.

=== Small business party (2017-2021) ===
In October 2017, Vithoulkas announced plans to challenge for a seat in State Parliament after establishing the Small Business Matters party.

The party was formed after the success of her Light Rail campaigning, with Vithoulkas saying: "The light rail (experience) inspired me. I could see that getting through to State Government after the fact is the hardest job of all," and that it was time to "take it up a notch in the upper house and keep the bastards honest".

Small Business Matters surpassed 1000 members on 6 November 2017, making it eligible to qualify and register as a political party. An official application for the party was submitted to the NSW Electoral Commission.

=== Wentworth by-election ===
Vithoulkas ran as an Independent candidate in the federal Wentworth by-election.
