= Clover Moore =

Australian politician (born 1945)

The Right Honourable the Lord Mayor of Sydney Councillor Clover Moore AO
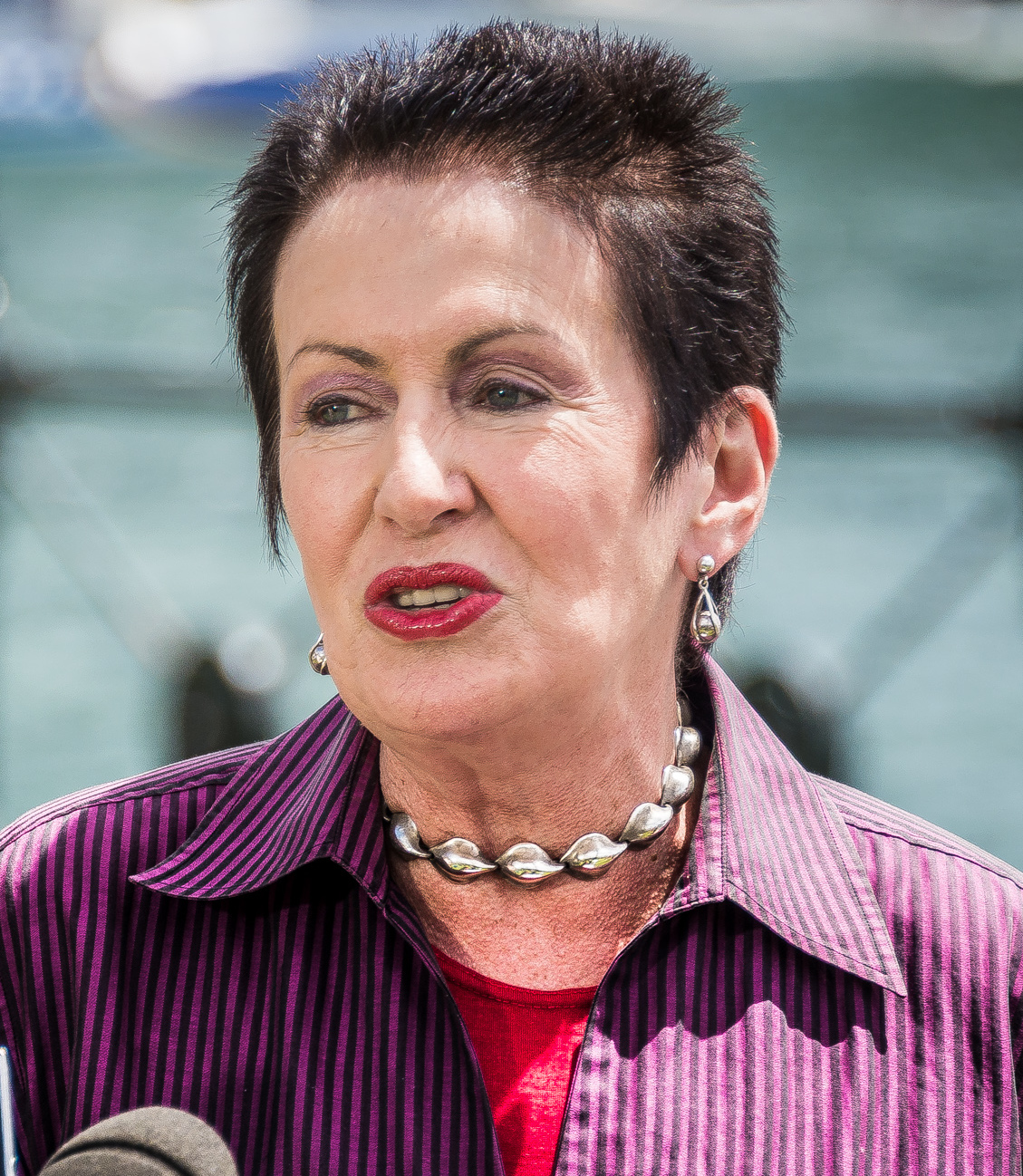
- Moore in 2015

82nd Lord Mayor of Sydney
- Incumbent
- Assumed office 27 March 2004
- Deputy: See list: John McInerney Verity Firth Chris Harris Tony Pooley Marcelle Hoff Phillip Black Marcelle Hoff Robert Kok Robyn Kemmis Irene Doutney Kerryn Phelps Jess Miller Linda Scott Jess Scully Sylvie Ellsmore Robert Kok
- Preceded by: Lucy Turnbull

Member of the New South Wales Parliament for Sydney
- In office 24 March 2007 – 20 September 2012
- Preceded by: District re-created
- Succeeded by: Alex Greenwich

Member of the New South Wales Parliament for Bligh
- In office 19 March 1988 – 24 March 2007
- Preceded by: Michael Yabsley
- Succeeded by: District abolished

Alderman of the City of Sydney for Redfern Ward
- In office 1 January 1982 – 26 March 1987

Alderman of the South Sydney Municipal Council for Redfern Ward
- In office 20 September 1980 – 31 December 1981

Personal details
- Born: Clover Margaret Collins; 22 October 1945 (age 81) Sydney Sanitarium, Wahroonga, New South Wales
- Party: Independent
- Other political affiliations: Clover Moore Independent Team
- Spouse: Peter Milton Moore
- Education: Loreto Kirribilli
- Alma mater: University of Sydney; Sydney Teachers' College
- Website: www.teamclover.com.au

Clover Margaret Moore (/ˈmɔː/ MORE; née Collins; born 22 October 1945) is an Australian politician who has served as the 82nd Lord Mayor of Sydney since 2004 and is the longest-serving lord mayor since the establishment of the City of Sydney in 1842. She was an independent member of the New South Wales Legislative Assembly from 1988 to 2012, representing the electorates of Bligh (1988–2007) and Sydney (2007–2012). Moore is the first popularly-elected woman to hold the office of lord mayor.

== Early life and education ==
The daughter of Francis John Collins (1902-1990), and Mary Kathleen Collins (1910-1997), née Cullen, Clover Margaret Collins was born at the Sydney Sanitarium, Wahroonga on 22 October 1945, and grew up in the suburb of Gordon, on Sydney's North Shore.

She attended Loreto Kirribilli at Kirribilli and Elm Court Dominican Convent, Moss Vale. Moore matriculated to the University of Sydney, and obtained a Bachelor of Arts in 1969 and a Diploma of Education from the Sydney Teachers' College, while residing at Sancta Sophia College.

After graduation she began work as an English and history teacher at St Ives High School and Fort Street High School, before moving to London to teach for several years. Moore married Peter Milton Moore, an architect, before returning to Australia.

== Local government ==
As a young mother in the Labor Party-dominated South Sydney Municipal Council, Moore became involved in a local resident action group. She decided to run for Council in 1980, after she and other members of the group had met, after three years of attempts, with then-mayor, Bill Hartup regarding a local park. Hartup had demanded to have its grass replaced with asphalt (to aid street-sweepers in seeing broken glass), surrounded by barbed wire (to keep out the drunks at night), and to have its lone tree removed (a nuisance).

Moore was elected as an independent alderman for Redfern Ward on South Sydney Municipal Council at the 1980 local government elections. Moore was one of three independents elected to the Council that formed a de facto opposition to the nine-member Labor caucus and Mayor Hartup who controlled the council and generally made most decisions in closed caucus meetings prior to Council meetings. However, in December 1981, the New South Wales Government amalgamated South Sydney Council with the City of Sydney, and Moore became a Redfern Ward Alderman of the newly formed Sydney City Council from 1 January 1982. Moore developed a visible profile in the community, campaigning on a variety of issues both in her position as alderman and in the broader community, particularly in her home suburb of Redfern. Moore was interested in the environment, conservation, and heritage preservation, being involved in the unsuccessful campaign to save the 1936 Rural Bank Building in Martin Place and describing the ALP Lord Mayor, Doug Sutherland, as the "Judas of Martin Place" for his role in approving its demolition in 1982.

Moore ran again for re-election to the three-member Redfern Ward in the 1984 Council Election, and was highly successful, taking first position, outpolling Bill Hartup with a 21% swing against the ALP, and enabling the election of the second candidate on her independent ticket, Sue Willis, ahead of the sitting Labor Alderman Stan Champley. In May 1984, Moore ran for the position of Deputy Lord Mayor after the election, but was defeated by the main right-wing Labor candidate, Stan Ashmore-Smith, when the two Independent Communist Aldermen (Jack Mundey and Brian McGahen) sided with the Labor caucus in the vote. Moore proved a high-profile campaigner on heritage preservation and environment conservation, gaining the ire of the Miscellaneous Workers' Union when she confronted a Council worker who was undertaking unsympathetic pruning to trees on a street in Redfern exclaiming "it's hard enough for trees to survive city pollution without their being massacred by untrained workmen sent to prune them", and denouncing the Sydney Cricket Ground Trust as "architectural barbarians, insensitive to the traditions of the ground" for approving the demolition of the historic 1909 Sheridan Stand of the Sydney Cricket Ground, which was nonetheless razed in 1986.

In late 1986, Moore started her campaign to become the city's first female Lord Mayor and defeat incumbent Doug Sutherland, declaring "I think everyone would agree it is time for a breath of fresh air and a Lord Mayor committed enough to stay in Sydney to do the job" in a criticism of Sutherland's frequent international trips. However, in March 1987 the state government abruptly sacked the Sydney City Council and appointed a board of commissioners to run it until new elections could be held. Having been unceremoniously dismissed from her elected office, Moore, along with five other fellow former independent aldermen Frank Sartor, Bill Hunt, Brian McGahen, Sue Willis and Jack Mundey, formed Independent Watch, an informal grouping with the purpose of scrutinising the decisions of the appointed commissioners and pressing for elections for a new council.

== Member of Parliament ==
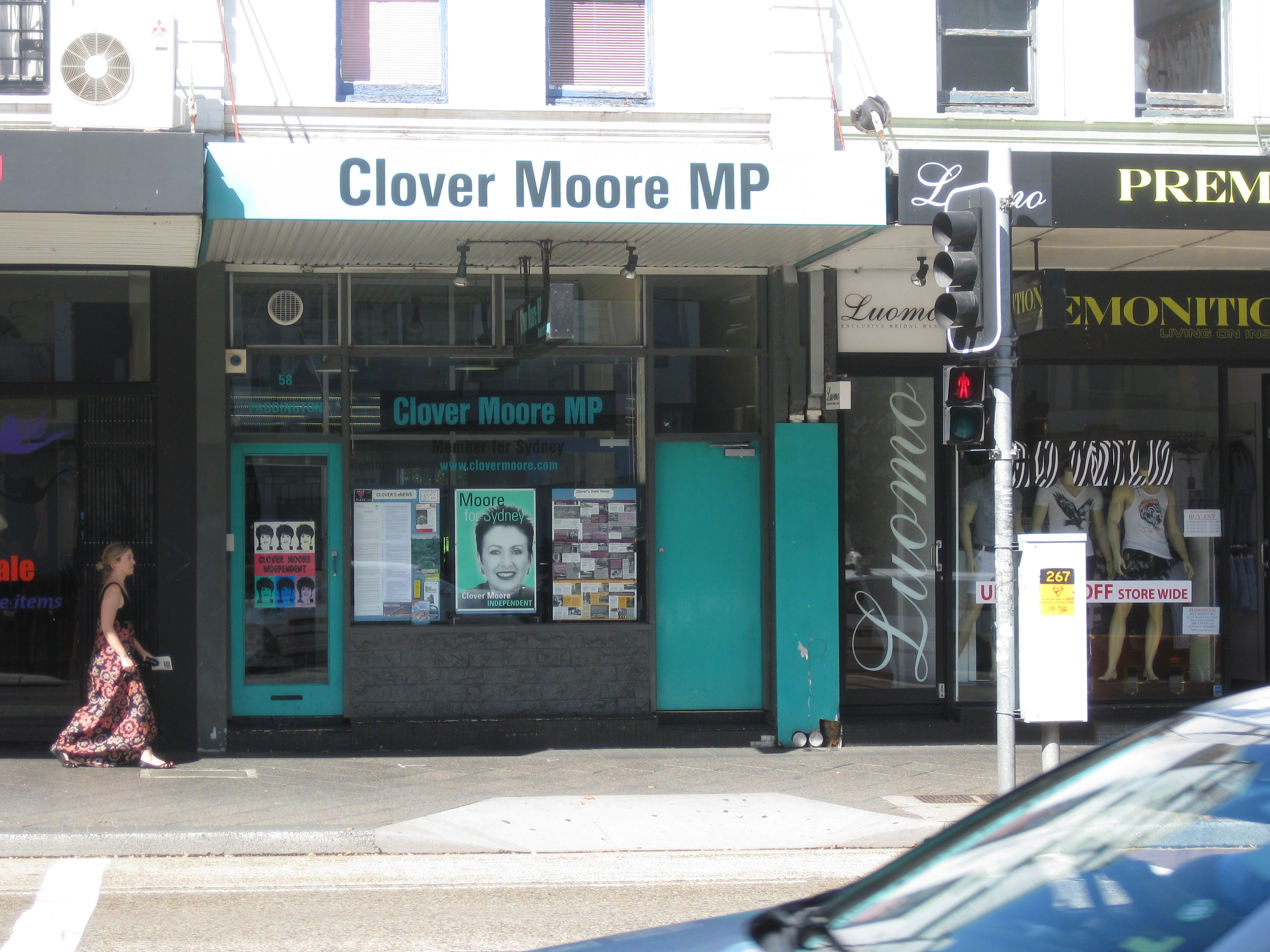
Clover Moore's state electorate office on Oxford Street, Paddington, in 2010

Instead of standing again for council, Moore decided to run for the New South Wales Legislative Assembly as an independent at the 1988 election, like her previous rival for the Lord Mayor position and fellow former independent alderman, Frank Sartor, who had decided to run as an independent in the inner Sydney seat of McKell. Despite not having the backing of a party, she won the seat of Bligh, narrowly defeating Liberal member Michael Yabsley.

In 1991, she co-authored the New South Wales Charter of Reform of Government. In the same year, she was re-elected for a second term with a massive swing in her favour, increasing her share from 26.7 per cent to 43 per cent. Her power also increased dramatically when, along with fellow independents Peter Macdonald and Tony Windsor, she gained the balance of power in the Legislative Assembly. Moore was to again take the spotlight when the Independent Commission Against Corruption handed down a finding that was sharply critical of Liberal Premier Nick Greiner on 1 June 1992. While the findings were still pending a ruling in the NSW Court of Appeals, Moore and two other Independent MPs made a symbolic march to the NSW Parliament with a threat to withdraw their support of the Coalition's minority government. Hence before the Court ruling was handed down, Greiner's hand was forced, and he resigned on 24 June 1992.

She went on to hold her seat with a largely safe margin at the 1995 and 1999 elections. The LGBT community thanked her for her support by featuring likenesses of her in the Sydney Gay and Lesbian Mardi Gras parade that year. She was re-elected again in 2003.

Prior to the 2007 election, the Electoral Commission redistributed electoral boundaries, renaming Bligh to "Sydney", and moving the seat north and west to encompass the Sydney CBD. Moore was elected to the new seat of Sydney.

Although she sat as an independent in parliament, Moore often worked with other minor parties and independents, particularly with the Australian Democrats, who sponsored some of her bills in the upper house and Moore encouraged voters at the 2011 state election to vote for the Democrats in the upper house, along with South Coast Independent MP, John Hatton.

Moore resigned as a state MP as a result of new state laws (labelled in the media as the "Get Clover" laws) preventing dual membership of state parliament and local councils. Following her re-election as mayor in the 2012 elections, she was forced to resign the state seat she held for 24 years before the first meeting of the new council. This resulted in a 2012 Sydney by-election on 27 October in which she endorsed independent candidate Alex Greenwich of the Australian Marriage Equality advocacy group who won in a landslide victory.

== Lord Mayor of Sydney ==
Clover Moore Independent Team Sydney City Council seats
- 2004 Election: 5 / 10
- 2008 Election: 6 / 10
- 2012 Election: 5 / 10
- 2016 Election: 6 / 10
- 2021 Election: 5 / 10
- 2024 Election: 4 / 10

In early 2004, the Labor Party government under Bob Carr sacked and re-amalgamated the City of Sydney and South Sydney Councils. The move came largely as a surprise, with then-Lord Mayor Lucy Turnbull being notified by a fax posted under her door. The decision to amalgamate the two councils was widely interpreted by the media as an attempt to get the Labor candidate, former federal minister Michael Lee, elected as Lord Mayor, as it would bring a large area of largely Labor-voting suburbs into the City of Sydney. However, several of these suburbs also made up Moore's state electorate of Bligh.

When Turnbull announced soon after that she would not seek re-election, Lee appeared to have the position won. Then, on 24 February, Moore entered the race, labelling the council's sacking a "cynical grab for power." Despite her ideological differences with Turnbull, she also sharply denounced the sacking of a democratically elected mayor. By the following day, The Sydney Morning Herald was already predicting that she would present a serious challenge to Lee. Moore won the election, finishing with more than double the vote of Lee, and ABC election analyst Antony Green announced that she would "romp through" to win, only 90 minutes after counting began. This made her the first popularly elected woman Lord Mayor of Sydney.

In the 2008 local government elections Moore was re-elected as Lord Mayor of Sydney. She was returned on a reduced majority in 2012, winning 51.1% of the vote. At the 2016 election she was comfortably returned to office, improving her vote 8.0% to win 59.1% of the popular vote.

After introducing bike lanes through many parts of inner Sydney, Moore broke an ankle on Ride to Work Day in October 2010, while dismounting from her bike, necessitating that she attend some events in a wheelchair.

=== Energy efficiency ===
Under Moore's leadership, the city of Sydney is aiming to reduce carbon emissions 70 per cent by 2030. It has installed bicycle lanes; upgraded its car fleet to hybrids; planted 10,000 trees; provided 600 on-street car-share spaces; installed Sydney's largest building-based solar photovoltaic system; installed water harvesting in 11 major parks and voted to install two new trigeneration plants.

Moore stated in an article on Impakter.com in September 2018 that emissions in Sydney have been reduced by 52% and the use of water by 36% since the year 2006 and that the city aims to become carbon neutral.

=== Building and infrastructure ===
Moore has overseen the construction of the:

- Surry Hills City of Sydney Library by FJMT (Francis-Jones Morehen Thorpe)
- Reg Bartley Oval grandstand and kiosk, Rushcutters Bay, by Lacoste+Stevenson
- Pirrama Park in Pyrmont by Aspect Studios Landscape Architecture, Hill Thalis Architecture + Urban Projects and CAB Consulting.

She introduced a system of cycleways within the City of Sydney. These angered some local residents for reducing parking, and critics attacked the cost, while other groups, including local headmasters and school groups, applauded them. The Bourke Street Cycleway won a Sydney Design Award in 2012. The state government removed one, subsequently reinstated, and co-funded another one down Oxford Street, noting that cycling increased with the impact of the COVID-19 pandemic.

=== Controversies ===
On 27 October 2007, Moore proposed a Private Members' Bill that would ban the sale of dogs, cats and other mammals in NSW pet stores, and effectively ban the breeding of crossbred dogs. The Pet Industry Association responded with a petition opposing the legislation. The RSPCA Australia gave its support to the measure, although it was rejected by NSW purebred dog breeders.

The conservative Liberal-National Coalition state government introduced the "City of Sydney Amendment (Elections) Bill" into law in September 2014, replacing one optional vote per business with two compulsory votes. This was widely regarded as yet another "Get Clover" law, designed to rig the vote towards a conservative challenger. The attempt failed with little change in the result, caused over 30,000 businesses to be fined for not voting and with the cost of the business register stated to be $1 million a year. The 2021 election saw Moore returned with a 68% to 32% two candidate preferred result with the Australian Labor Party as the second placed candidate rather than the right-wing Coalition. With the Labor Party having won power at the last NSW State Election they passed a law in late 2023 to return to the old system of each business having 1 optional vote.

Between 2014 and 2017 Cloud Arch, a steel sculpture intended to be installed over George Street in Sydney, had its budget rise from A$3.5 million to 11.3 million dollars. It was criticised for both the rise in cost, after a re-design, and for not being suited to the city's aesthetic.

In 2023 Moore proposed cutting Moore Park Golf Course from 18 holes to 9, in order to create a new park, which drew criticism from golfers, who suggested that it was her self-interest which drove the proposal, as Moore lives nearby. The state government supports the move, and the park was in its planning stages as of September 2024. In the June 2025 NSW budget, Chris Minns' government allocated $20 million for works to turn most of the northern part of the golf course to public open space.

== Honours ==
Moore was appointed as an Officer of the Order of Australia in the 2023 King's Birthday Honours for "distinguished service to local government, to the people and Parliament of New South Wales, and to the community of Sydney".

New South Wales Legislative Assembly
Preceded by Michael Yabsley	Member for Bligh; 1988–2007	District abolished
New district	Member for Sydney; 2007–2012	Succeeded by Alex Greenwich
Civic offices
Preceded by Lucy Turnbull	Lord Mayor of Sydney; 2004–present	Incumbent
