= Christine Forster =

Australian local government politician

Councillor of the City of Sydney
- In office 8 September 2012 – 4 December 2021

Personal details
- Party: Liberal
- Spouse: Virginia Flitcroft (m. 2018)
- Relations: Tony Abbott (brother)
- Occupation: Politician
- Profession: Journalist
- Website: www.christineforster.com.au

Christine Forster is an Australian former local government politician who was a Liberal councillor in the City of Sydney (2012–2021) and the younger sister of former Australian Prime Minister Tony Abbott.

Forster attended the University of Sydney, completing a Bachelor of Economics. In her time at the University of Sydney, she ran for the Students' Representative Council (SRC) as a Democratic Alliance candidate, and becoming an SRC Representative in 1982.

Forster worked as a journalist covering the Australian energy sector for resources information service Platts, was elected to the City of Sydney Council in September 2012 and in 2014 announced a plan to run for the New South Wales Legislative Council. Forster has opposed local council amalgamation plans, called for Martin Place to be smoke free, and advocated tall buildings and increased street parking in Sydney City. She describes herself as "committed to the principles of common sense government, genuine sustainability, free enterprise and respect for the individual".

Forster lives with her wife Virginia Flitcroft, with whom she has raised money for the Sir David Martin Foundation and campaigned for same-sex marriage. Forster had been married previously. In 2013, she attended the launch of the Bingham Cup in Sydney, along with Bruce Notley-Smith, Don Harwin, Malcolm Turnbull, Nick Farr-Jones and John Eales.

Following the 2018 Liberal leadership spill that resulted in the defeat of Malcolm Turnbull, Forster indicated that she would seek preselection as a Liberal candidate for 2018 Wentworth by-election, but later withdrew her nomination.
