= Results of the 2024 New South Wales local elections in Mid North Coast =

2024 New South Wales local elections (Mid North Coast)
- 14 September 2024

This is a list of results for the 2024 New South Wales local elections in the Mid North Coast region.

Mid North Coast covers six local government areas (LGAs), including the City of Coffs Harbour and Port Macquarie-Hastings Council.

== Bellingen ==
2024 Bellingen Shire Council election
- 14 September 2024

All 6 seats on Bellingen Shire Council (Note: Excluding the mayor, who is directly-elected.) 4 seats needed for a majority
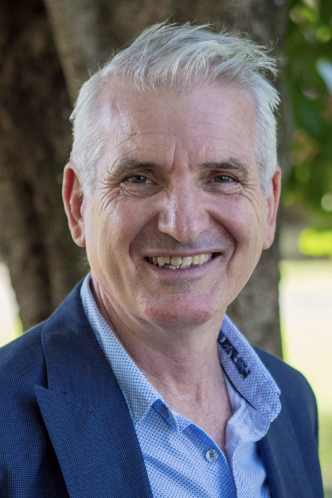
	First party	Second party	Third party
	WWI		CF
Leader	Steve Allan	Dominic King	Graeme Shephard
Party	Waterfall Way Inds	Greens	Community First
Last election	2 seats	2 seats	Did not exist
Seats before	2	2	2
Seats won	3	2	1
Seat change	▲1	Steady	▼1
First preference vote	4,342	2,481	1,273
Percentage	53.6%	30.6%	15.7%
Swing	▲19.8	▲4.7	▲1.7 (Note: Compared with Team Joanne Cook at the 2021 election.)
Largest party before election
Waterfall Way Inds
Subsequent largest party
Waterfall Way Inds

Bellingen Shire Council is composed of six councillors elected proportionally to a single ward, as well as a directly-elected mayor.

Graeme Shephard, who was elected second on the "Team Joanne Cook" ticket in 2021, led the new "Community First" group. Joanne Cook was second on the ticket, with fellow councillor Stephen Glyde (who led the "Stephen Glyde Group" in 2021) in the fourth and final position.

Only three groups stood at the election, down from six in 2021. The Labor Party did not recontest.

=== Bellingen results ===
2024 New South Wales local elections: Bellingen
Party	Candidate	Votes	%	±%
Waterfall Way Inds	1. Steve Allan; 2. Eleanor Tree (elected 1); 3. Jo Brotherton (elected 3); 4. Andrew O'Keefe (elected 6); 5. Linda Coomber; 6. Steve Ryan	4,342	53.6	+19.8
Greens	1. Dominic King (elected 2); 2. Jennie Fenton (elected 4); 3. Gary Fry; 4. Wendy Firefly	2,481	30.6	+4.7
Community First	1. Graeme Shephard (elected 5); 2. Joanne Cook; 3. Cathryn McGuire; 4. Stephen Glyde	1,273	15.7	+1.7
Total formal votes		8,096	95.3	
Informal votes		404	4.7	
Turnout		8,500	81.5	

== Coffs Harbour ==
2024 Coffs Harbour City Council election
- 14 September 2024

All 9 seats on Coffs Harbour City Council 5 seats needed for a majority
- Registered: 58,940
- Mayor
- Turnout: 83.83% (▲1.05)
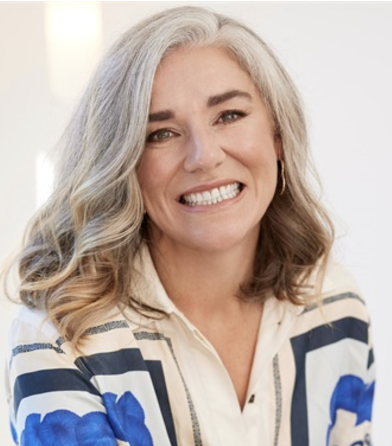

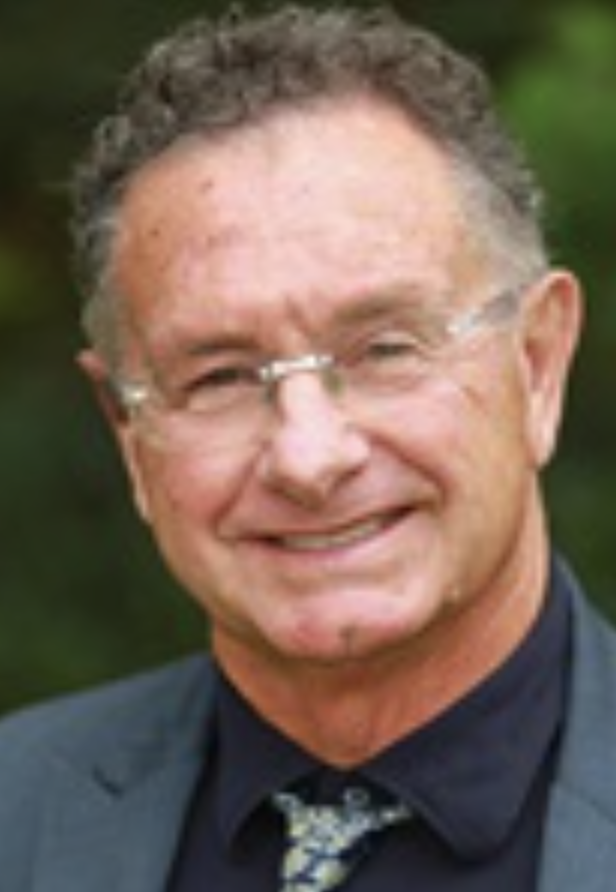
	First party	Second party
Candidate	Nikki Williams	Paul Amos
Party	Team Nikki	Team Moose
Primary vote	15,411	12,591
Percentage	32.76%	26.77%
Swing	▲32.76	▲2.33
TCP	55.16%	44.84%
TCP swing	▲55.16	▼17.37
Mayor before election
Paul Amos
Team Moose
Elected Mayor
Nikki Williams
Team Nikki
- Councillors
Party	Leader	Vote %	Seats	+/–
Team Nikki	Nikki Williams	34.1	3	+3
Team Moose	Paul Amos	22.9	2	
Labor	Ben Whiting	9.6	1	
Greens	Jonathan Cassell	8.6	1	
Better Coffs Coast	George Cecato	8.4	1	
This lists parties that won seats. See the complete results below.

Coffs Harbour City Council is composed of a directly-elected mayor and eight councillors elected proportionally to a single ward.

The National Party does not endorse candidates for local elections. Coffs Harbour MP Gurmesh Singh, the deputy leader of the NSW Nationals, endorsed Nikki Williams (Team Nikki), George Cecato (Better Coffs Coast) and Tegan Swan (Independent) in the mayoral election. Both Williams and Cecato are Nationals members.

=== Coffs Harbour mayor ===
2024 New South Wales mayoral elections: Coffs Harbour
Party	Candidate	Votes	%	±%
Team Nikki	Nikki Williams	15,411	32.76	+32.76
Team Moose	Paul Amos	12,591	26.77	+2.33
Labor	Tony Judge	4,204	8.94	+0.64
Better Coffs Coast	George Cecato	4,066	8.64	–3.41
Together We Thrive	Tegan Swan	4,007	8.52	+8.52
Greens	Jonathon Cassell	3,546	7.54	+1.11
Independent	Rodney Fox	3,214	6.83	+6.83
Total formal votes		47,039	95.20	–1.02
Informal votes		2,373	4.80	+1.02
Turnout		49,412	83.83	+1.05
Two-candidate-preferred result
Team Nikki	Nikki Williams	19,343	55.16	+55.16
Team Moose	Paul Amos	15,721	44.84	–17.37
Team Nikki gain from Team Moose				

=== Coffs Harbour results ===
2024 New South Wales local elections: Coffs Harbour
Party	Candidate	Votes	%	±%
Team Nikki	1. Nikki Williams; 2. Cath Fowler (elected 1); 3. Les Oxford (elected 3); 4. Gurminder Saro (elected 5); 5. Matt Gosling; 6. Falak Othman; 7. Clinton Hayes; 8. Barbara Haigh; 9. Neil Manson	15,428	34.1	
Team Moose	1. Paul Amos (elected 2); 2. Julie Sechi (elected 4); 3. Scott Wolgamot; 4. Sally Townley	10,361	22.9	+0.4
Labor	1. Tony Judge (elected 6); 2. Htun Htun Oo; 3. Lealah Durow; 4. Glenis Hunter; 5. Danny Wilson	4,356	9.6	−1.0
Greens	1. Jonathan Cassell (elected 7); 2. Tim Nott; 3. Eugenie Gerlach; 4. Elaine Sherwood; 5. Olivier La Mer-Adair	3,956	8.6	−0.3
Better Coffs Coast	1. George Cecato (elected 8); 2. Jesse Young; 3. Jeffrey (Jack) Dix; 4. Tiga Cross; 5. Matthew Culgan; 6. Katherine Listkow	3,798	8.4	−5.8
Together We Thrive	1. Tegan Swan; 2. Marcus Blackwell; 3. Lucas Craig; 4. Lisa Nichols; 5. Mel Browne	3,677	8.1	−2.5
Independent	1. Rodney Fox; 2. Nicole Bourne; 3. Michael Thompson-Blair; 4. Dudley Mitchell-Adams	2,992	6.6	
Independent	1. John O'Brien; 2. Jasmine Braun; 3. Dorothea Skoludek; 4. Kristel O'Brien	626	1.4	
Total formal votes		45,194	91.5	
Informal votes		4,206	8.5	
Turnout		49,400	83.8	

== Kempsey ==
2024 Kempsey Shire Council election
- 14 September 2024

All 8 seats on Kempsey Shire Council 5 seats needed for a majority
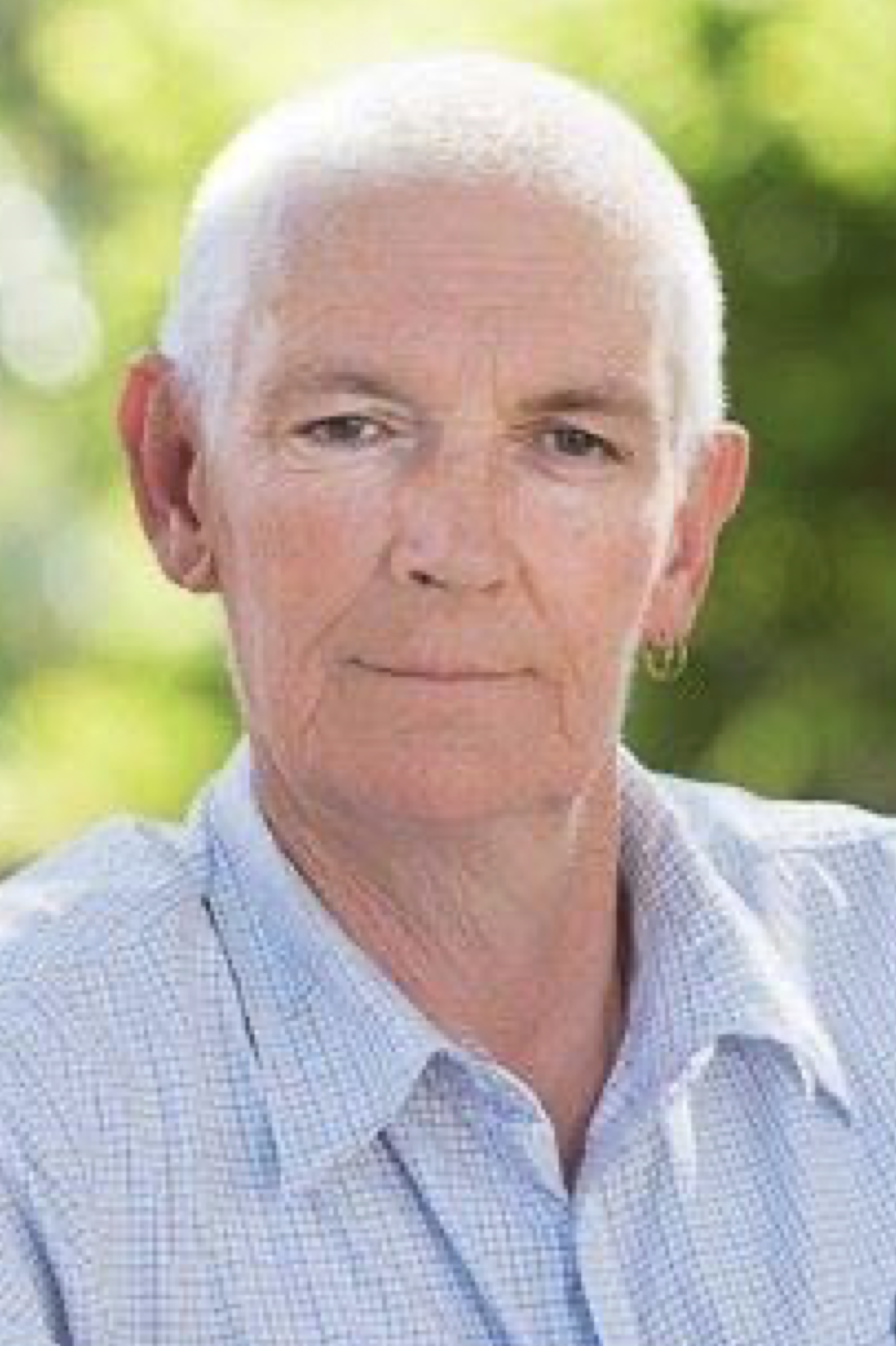
	First party	Second party
	IND
Leader	N/A	Arthur Bain
Party	Independents (Note: Including local groups (not to be confused with locally-registered political parties).)	Greens
Last election	7 seats	1 seat
Seats before	7	1
Seats won	7	1
Seat change	Steady	Steady
First preference vote	15,325	2,213
Percentage	87.4%	12.6%
Swing	▲7.3%	▼7.3%
Largest party before election
Independents
Subsequent largest party
Independents

Kempsey Shire Council is composed of eight councillors elected proportionally to a single ward, as well as a directly-elected mayor.

At the 2021 election, seven independents were elected, as well as one member of the Greens. However, the election was re-run in 2022 after the New South Wales Electoral Commission's online voting system crashed, preventing 34 people in Kempsey from casting their vote.

=== Kempsey results ===
2024 New South Wales local elections: Kempsey
Party	Candidate	Votes	%	±%
Independent	1. Alexandra Wyatt (elected 1); 2. Julie Coburn (elected 6); 3. June Wilson; 4. Gail Ryan	5,195	29.6	+20.6
Independent	1. Kinne Ring; 2. Annette Lawrence (elected 2); 3. Adam Matchett (elected 8); 4. Tyrone Walker	3,639	20.7	+13.4
The Selby Team	1. Noel Selby (elected 5); 2. Charanjit Bedi; 3. Richard Pearson; 4. Lindsay Keay	2,299	13.1	+8.7
Independent	1. Dean Saul (elected 3); 2. Scott Butterfield; 3. Rebecca Clifford; 4. Grant Simpson; 5. Tina Carney	2,253	12.8	−9.8
Greens	1. Arthur Bain (elected 4); 2. Michael Jones; 3. Vicki Taylor; 4. Beris Derwent	2,213	12.6	−7.3
Independent	Ben Paix (elected 7)	1,551	8.8	+8.8
Independent	Troy Irwin	252	1.4	−2.6
Independent	Trevor Martin	107	0.6	+0.6
Independent	Stephen McNamara	29	0.2	−0.3
Total formal votes		17,538	89.3	−3.5
Informal votes		2,108	10.7	+3.5
Turnout		19,646	81.8	+3.1

== Nambucca Valley ==
2024 Nambucca Valley Council election
- 14 September 2024

All 8 seats on Nambucca Valley Council 5 seats needed for a majority

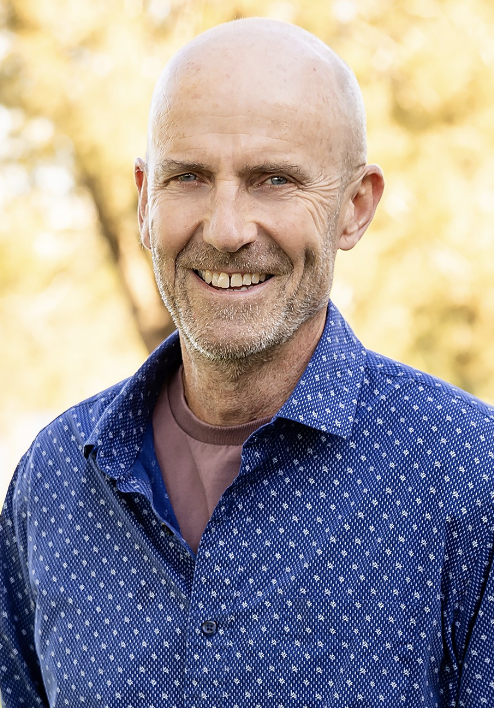
	First party	Second party	Third party
	IND
Leader	N/A	Susan Jenvey	David Jones
Party	Independents	Labor	Greens
Last election	7 seats	1 seat	Did not contest
Seats before	6	1	1
Largest party before election
Independents
Subsequent largest party
Independents

Nambucca Valley Council is composed of eight councillors elected proportionally to a single ward, as well as a directly-elected mayor.

On 28 June 2024, councillor David Jones joined the Greens. He had contested the 2021 election as an independent.

=== Nambucca Valley results ===
2024 New South Wales local elections: Nambucca Valley
Party	Candidate	Votes	%	±%
Independent	Gary Lee	2,282	18.4	
Labor	Susan Jenvey (elected)	1,835	14.8	−1.7
Independent	James Angel (elected)	1,787	14.4	+7.5
Greens	David Jones (elected)	1,378	11.1	+7.7
Independent	Ljubov Simson (elected)	1,303	10.5	
Independent	Jane Smith (elected)	1,277	10.3	
Independent	Tamara Castle (elected)	1,131	9.1	
Independent	Troy Vance (elected)	658	5.3	+2.5
Independent	Martin Ballangarry (elected)	590	4.8	−1.4
Independent	Marc Percival	169	1.4	
Total formal votes		12,410	90.8	
Informal votes		1,261	9.2	
Turnout		13,671	81.7	

== Port Macquarie-Hastings ==
2024 Port Macquarie-Hastings Council election
- 14 September 2024

All 9 seats on Port Macquarie-Hastings Council 5 seats needed for a majority
- Registered: 70,011
- Mayor
- Turnout: 85.11%
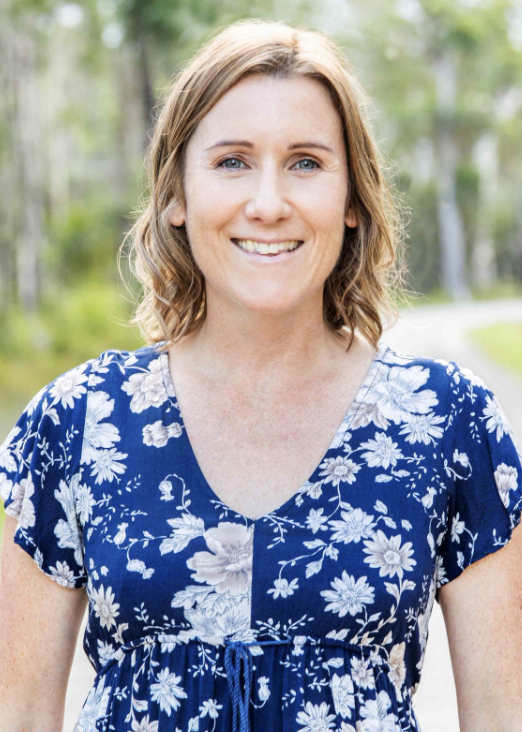

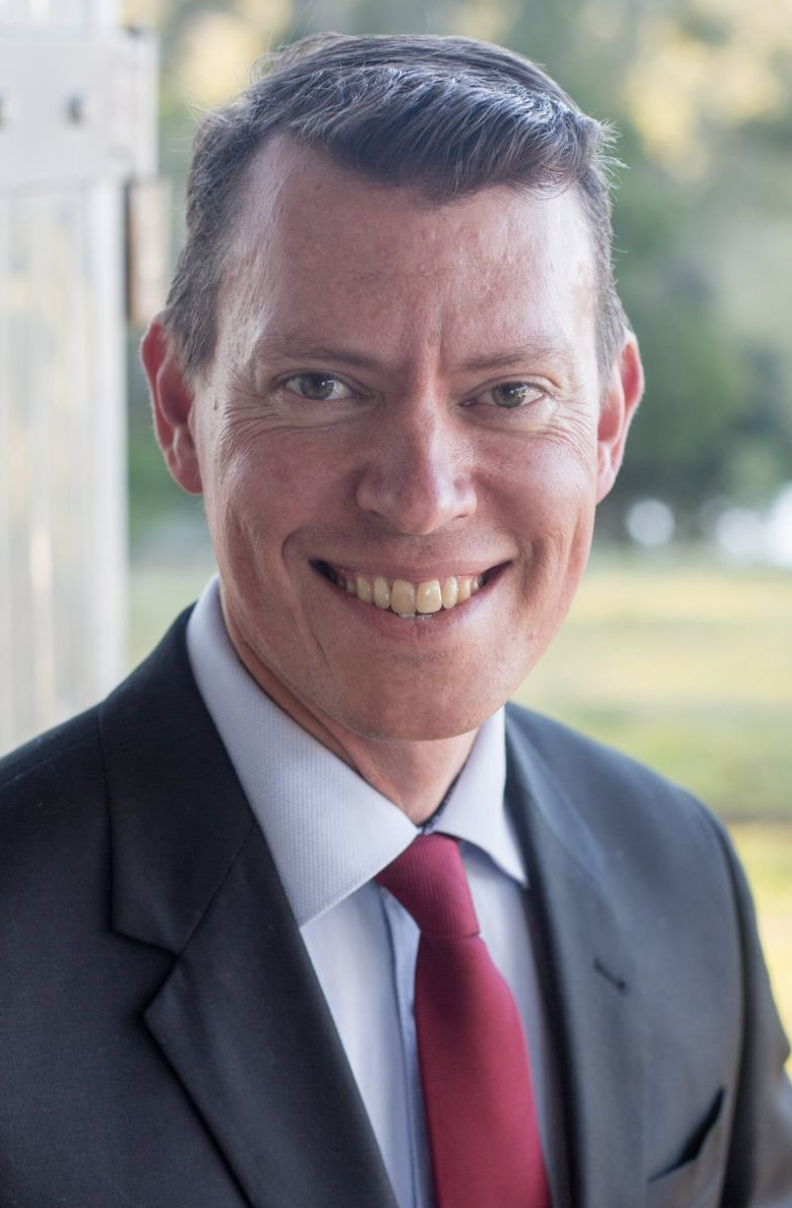
	First party	Second party
	ROB	LIP
Candidate	Adam Roberts	Nik Lipovac
Party	Team Roberts	Team Lipovac
Primary vote	21,080	12,972
Percentage	37.8%	23.3%
Swing	▼17.1	▲17.6
TCP	60.1%	39.9%
	Third party	Fourth party
Candidate	Lauren Edwards	Mark Hornshaw
Party	Greens	Libertarian
Primary vote	11,898	9,758
Percentage	21.4%	17.5%
Swing	▲21.4	▲17.5
Mayor before election
Peta Pinson
Team Pinson
Elected Mayor
Adam Roberts
Team Roberts
- Councillors
Party	Leader	Vote %	Seats	+/–
Team Roberts	Adam Roberts	28.0	2	−2
Team Sheppard	Rachel Sheppard	17.2	2	+1
Libertarian	Mark Hornshaw	16.0	1	+1
Team Lipovac	Nik Lipovac	15.2	1	0
Greens	Lauren Edwards	14.0	1	0
Labor	Hamish Tubman	8.8	1	+1
This lists parties that won seats. See the complete results below.

Port Macquarie-Hastings Council is composed of eight councillors elected proportionally to a single ward, as well as a directly-elected mayor.

In July 2023, Team Pinson councillor Sharon Griffiths resigned from council. Her position was left vacant until the 2024 election.

Incumbent mayor Peta Pinson (Team Pinson) did not seek re-election, endorsing "Team Roberts". Team Roberts was led by councillor Adam Roberts and included fellow councillors Danielle Maltman and Josh Slade, who were all elected as part of Team Pinson in 2021.

Rachel Sheppard initially planned to contest the mayoral election, but withdrew in early August 2024 to only contest the councillor election. Lisa Intemann, who was elected leading the "Fighters For Our Region" group in 2021, joined Team Sheppard.

A referendum was also held alongside the election, asking if the total number of councillors should be reduced from nine to seven (including the mayor). Team Roberts supported the "Yes" vote, while all other candidates supported the "No" vote.

=== Port Macquarie-Hastings mayor ===
2024 New South Wales mayoral elections: Port Macquarie-Hastings
Party	Candidate	Votes	%	±%
Team Roberts	Adam Roberts	21,080	37.8	−17.1 (Note: Compared with Peta Pinson (Team Pinson) at the 2021 election.)
Team Lipovac	Nik Lipovac	12,972	23.3	+17.6
Greens	Lauren Edwards	11,898	21.4	+21.4
Libertarian	Mark Hornshaw	9,758	17.5	+17.5
Total formal votes		55,708	93.5	
Informal votes		3,879	6.5	
Turnout		59,587	85.11	
Two-candidate-preferred result
Team Roberts	Adam Roberts	25,092	60.1	
Team Lipovac	Nik Lipovac	16,652	39.9	
Team Roberts gain from Team Pinson		Swing	N/A	

=== Port Macquarie-Hastings results ===
2024 New South Wales local elections: Port Macquarie-Hastings
Party	Candidate	Votes	%	±%
Team Roberts	1. Adam Roberts; 2. Danielle Maltman (elected); 3. Chris Kirkman (elected); 4. Evan O'Brien; 5. Kylie Van Der Ley; 6. Josh Slade	15,343	28.0	−18.8 (Note: Compared with Team Pinson at the 2021 election.)
Team Sheppard	1. Rachel Sheppard (elected); 2. Lisa Intemann (elected); 3. Kingsley Searle; 4. Linda Elbourne	9,397	17.2	+1.9
Libertarian	1. Mark Hornshaw (elected); 2. Breelin Coetzer; 3. Duane Stace; 4. Deborah Cooper; 5. David Bird	8,763	16.0	+16.0
Team Lipovac	1. Nik Lipovac (elected); 2. Jon Bailey; 3. Ellen Crepaz; 4. Luke Garel	8,326	15.2	+6.8
Greens	1. Lauren Edwards (elected); 2. Stuart Watson; 3. Jane McIntyre; 4. Leslie Mitchell	7,668	14.0	+5.0
Labor	1. Hamish Tubman (elected); 2. Lorna Neal; 3. Reginald Millar; 4. Susan Baker	4,823	8.8	+8.8
Independent	DJ Apanui	401	0.7	+0.7
Total formal votes		54,721	91.8	
Informal votes		4,868	8.2	
Turnout		59,589	85.11	
