= 2024 New South Wales mayoral elections =

- 14 September 2024

All 37 directly-elected mayors in New South Wales

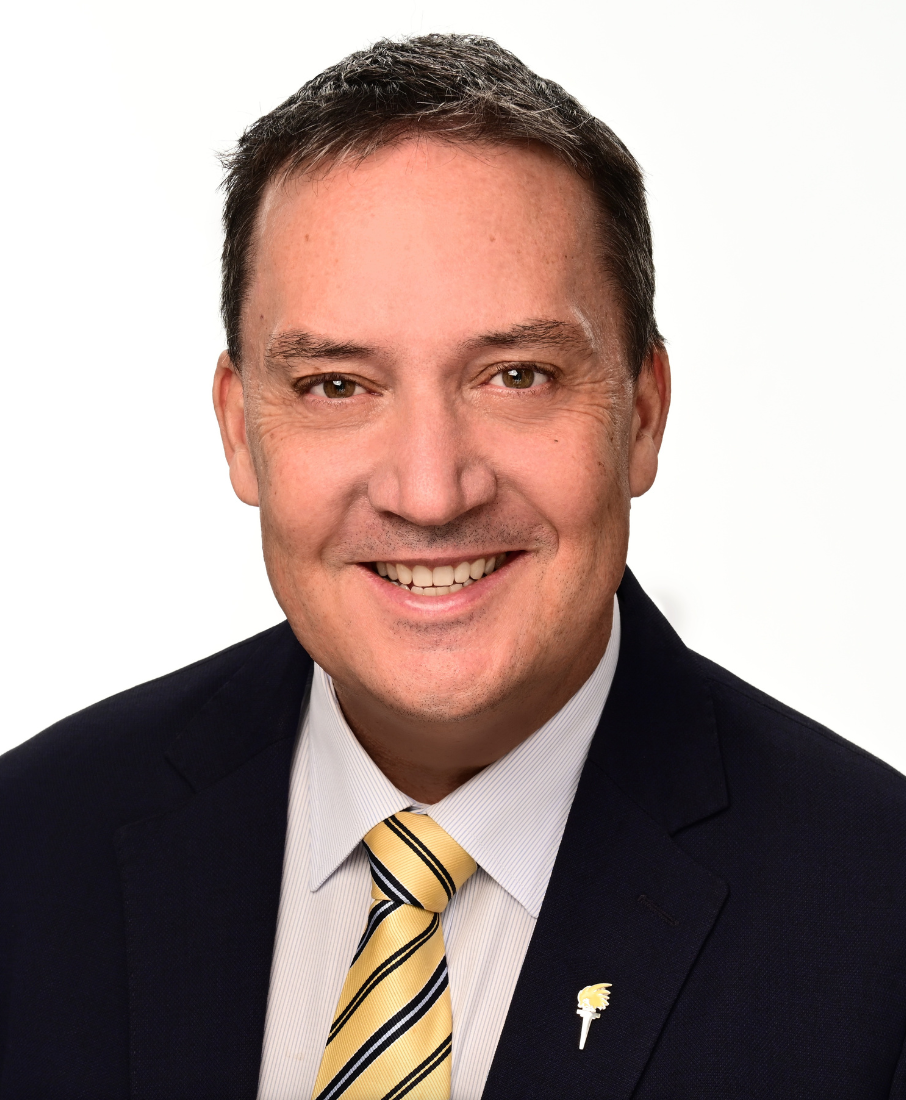
	First party	Second party	Third party
	IND
Leader	N/A	N/A	N/A
Party	Independents (Note: Including local groups (not to be confused with locally-registered political parties).)	Labor	Liberal
Last election	23 mayors	4 mayors	4 mayors
Seats before	23	4	4
	Fourth party	Fifth party	Sixth party
		OLC
Leader	No leader	Paul Garrard	John Ruddick
Party	Greens	OLC	Libertarian
Last election	1 mayor	1 mayor	Did not contest
Seats before	1	0	0
Seats won	1	0	0
Seat change	Steady	Steady	Steady

Elections were held on 14 September 2024 to elect mayors or lord mayors to 37 of the 128 local government areas (LGAs) in New South Wales, Australia. The elections took place as part of the statewide local elections.

== Background ==
=== 2021 referendums ===
At the 2021 local elections, four referendum questions were put to voters about directly elected mayors.

When asked if they supported the introduction of a directly elected mayor, 72.7% voted "Yes" in Bega Valley and 76.2% voted "Yes" in Ryde. In Wagga Wagga, 50.6% voted "No" to the creation of a directly elected mayor, the closest margin of any local referendum questions in 2021. In Griffith, voters were asked if they supported removing the direct mayoral election, to which 71.8% voted "No".

=== Angelo Tsirekas dismissal ===
On 6 April 2022, it was announced Canada Bay mayor Angelo Tsirekas (Our Local Community) was under investigation by the Independent Commission Against Corruption (ICAC) over allegations he accepted benefits from developer I-Prosperity Group in return for "favourable planning decisions" dating back to 2012.

Tsirekas was suspended as mayor on 9 November 2023 after ICAC found he had engaged in corrupt conduct. It was found he received benefits including overseas flights and accommodation, worth at least $18,800, between 2015 and 2019.

On 13 December 2023, Tsirekas was dismissed as mayor by Minister for Local Government Ron Hoenig. He was banned from civic office for a period of five years. On 25 January 2024, Michael Megna (Liberal) was appointed by councillors to serve for the remainder of the term.

== Candidates ==
Incumbents at the time of the elections are highlighted in bold text. Successful candidates are highlighted in the relevant colour.

LGA	Held by	Labor	Liberal	Greens	Independents	Others
Ballina	Sharon Cadwallader Team	Andrew Broadley		Kiri Dicker	**Sharon Cadwallader** (SCT)	
Ballina	Sharon Cadwallader Team	Andrew Broadley		Kiri Dicker	Keith Hall (Ind); Phil Meehan (Ind)	
Bega Valley	Independent	Helen O'Neil		Peter Haggar	**Russell Fitzpatrick** (Ind)	
Bega Valley	Independent	Helen O'Neil		Peter Haggar	David Porter (IFC); Mitchell Nadin (IFC); Tony Allen (Ind)	
Bellingen	Waterfall Way Inds			Dominic King	**Steve Allan** (WWI)	
Broken Hill	For A Better Broken Hill	Darriea Turley			**Tom Kennedy** (FABBH)	
Broken Hill	For A Better Broken Hill	Darriea Turley			David Gallagher (TBH)	
Burwood	Labor	**John Faker**	David Hull			Guitang Lu (Unity)
Byron	Byron Independents	Asren Pugh		Sarah Ndiaye	**Michael Lyon** (BI); David Warth (BSC)	
Canada Bay	Liberal	Andrew Ferguson	**Michael Megna**	Charles Jago		
Cessnock	Labor	**Jay Suvaal**		Llynda Nairn	Daniel Watton (CI)	
Coffs Harbour	Team Moose	Tony Judge		Jonathan Cassell	Nikki Williams (TN); Tegan Swan (TWT); Rodney Fox (Ind); **Paul Amos** (TM); George Cecato (BCC)	
Dungog	Independent				Digby Rayward (Ind)	Michael Dowling (Ind. Nat)
Dungog	Independent				**John Connors** (Ind); Karen Drinan (Ind)	Michael Dowling (Ind. Nat)
Eurobodalla	Advance Eurobodalla	Sharon Winslade		Colleen Turner	Phil Constable (Ind); Rob Pollock (Ind); Mick Johnson (Ind); Clair Mcash (Ind); **Mat Hatcher** (AE); Anthony Mayne (MT)	
Fairfield	Frank Carbone	George Barcha				**Frank Carbone** (FC)
Griffith	Independent				**Doug Curran** (Ind); Anne Napoli (Ind)	
Hornsby	Liberal	Janelle McIntosh	Warren Waddell	Tania Salitra	Roger Woodward (Ind); Nathan Tilbury (NTH)	
Hunter's Hill	Liberal		**Zac Miles**		Ross Williams (TR)	
Kempsey	Independent			Arthur Bain	**Leo Hauville** (Ind); Charanjit Bedi (Ind); Dean Saul (Ind); Tony Irwin (Ind); Simon Fergusson (Ind); Kinne Ring (Ind)	
Lake Macquarie	Labor	Adam Shultz	Melody Harding	Bryce Ham	Romairi Dawson (Ind); John Gilbert (OLC); Kate Warner (LMI)	
Lismore	Steve Krieg for Lismore	Harper Dalton-Earls		Vanessa Grindon-Ekins	**Steve Krieg** (SKFL)	
Lismore	Steve Krieg for Lismore	Harper Dalton-Earls		Vanessa Grindon-Ekins	Big Rob (Ind); John Jenkins (Ind)	
Liverpool	Liberal	Betty Green	**Ned Mannoun**		Michael Andjelkovic (Ind); Michael Tierney (Ind); Robert Aiken (Ind); Karress Rhodes (LI)	Peter Ristevski (OLC); Gemma Noiosi (LBT); Peter Harle (LCIT); Deb Gurung (CVA)
Maitland	Penfold Independents	Ben Whiting		Campbell Knox	Sean Saffari (Ind); **Philip Penfold** (PI)	
Mosman	Serving Mosman	John Wakefield			Simon Menzies (Ind); Roy Bendall (MB)	Ann Kimber (SM)
Nambucca Valley	Independent	Susan Jenvey		David Jones	Ljubov Simson (Ind); Gary Lee (Ind)	
Newcastle	Labor	**Nuatali Nelmes**	Callum Pull	Charlotte McCabe	Ross Kerridge (ON)	Steve O'Brien (SA); Milton Caine (C4C)
Orange	Team Hamling	Jeffery Whitton		David Mallard	Gerald Power (Ind); Melanie McDonell (Ind); Kevin Duffy (Ind); Tony Mileto (Ind); Tammy Greenhalgh (TFO)	
Port Macquarie-Hastings	Team Pinson			Lauren Edwards	Adam Roberts (TR)	Mark Hornshaw (LBT)
Port Macquarie-Hastings	Team Pinson			Lauren Edwards	Nik Lipovac (TL)	Mark Hornshaw (LBT)
Port Stephens	Independent	Leah Anderson			Mark Watson (SPS); Paul Le Monttee (Ind)	
Richmond Valley	Independent				**Robert Mustow** (Ind); Robert Hayes (Ind); Lyndall Murray (RVV); John Walker (ATFC)	
Ryde	Liberal	Bernard Purcell	Trenton Brown	Tina Kordrostami	Roy Maggio (RMI)	
Shellharbour	Chris Homer Independents	Rob Peterski			**Chris Homer** (CHI); Paul Rankin (Ind)	
Shoalhaven	Greens			Kaye Gartner	Jemma Tribe (TT)	Patricia White (SIG)
Singleton	Independent	Peree Watson			**Sue Moore** (Ind); Danny Thompson (Ind)	
Sydney	Team Clover (CMIT)	Zann Maxwell	Lydon Gannon	Sylvie Ellsmore	Susan Ritchie (Ind); Baiyu Chen (Ind); Sam Danieli (WLS)	**Clover Moore** (CMIT)
Sydney	Team Clover (CMIT)	Zann Maxwell	Lydon Gannon	Sylvie Ellsmore	Susan Ritchie (Ind); Baiyu Chen (Ind); Sam Danieli (WLS)	Yvonne Weldon (YWI); Sean Masters (LBT); Rachel Evans (SA)
The Hills	Liberal	Immanuel Selvaraj	Michelle Byrne	Mila Kasby		
Uralla	Independent				**Robert Bell** (Ind)	
Willoughby	Community Matters				**Tanya Taylor** (TTCM)	Henry Luo (Ind. Labor)
Willoughby	Community Matters				Anna Greco (WCI); Roy McCallagh (TR); Jade Yu-Chun Hsueh (Ind)	Henry Luo (Ind. Labor)
Wollondilly	Matt Gould Team				**Matt Gould** (MGT)	
Wollondilly	Matt Gould Team				Ben Banasik (ETL); Bev Spearpoint (BST); Paul Rogers (TP)	
Wollongong	Wollongong Independents	Tania Brown		Jess Whittaker	Suzanne de Vive (Ind); Ryan Morris (Ind)	Andrew Anthony (Ind. SAP)

=== Retiring mayors ===
- Kay Fraser (Labor) − Lake Macquarie, announced 8 March 2024
- Carolyn Corrigan (Serving Mosman) − Mosman, announced 1 May 2024 (contesting as councillor candidate)
- Amanda Findley (Greens) − Shoalhaven, announced 6 May 2024
- Gordon Bradbery (Wollongong Independents) − Wollongong, announced 16 May 2024
- Peta Pinson (Team Pinson) − Port Macquarie-Hastings, announced 1 July 2024 (endorsed Team Roberts)
- Ryan Palmer (Independent) − Port Stephens, announced 31 July 2024
- Jason Hamling (Team Hamling) − Orange, announced 5 August 2024
- Philip Ruddock (Liberal) − Hornsby, lost preselection 5 August 2024
- Peter Gangemi (Liberal) − The Hills, lost preselection 6 August 2024
- Rhonda Hoban (Independent) − Nambucca Valley, announced 14 August 2024

== Results ==
=== Ballina ===
2024 New South Wales mayoral elections: Ballina
Party	Candidate	Votes	%	±%
Sharon Cadwallader Team	Sharon Cadwallader	13,783	49.54	+11.54
Greens	Kiri Dicker	5,976	21.48	+21.48
Labor	Andrew Broadley	2,930	10.53	−5.17
Independent	Kevin Loughrey	2,670	9.60	+9.60
Independent	Phil Meehan	2,465	8.86	+8.86
Total formal votes		27,824	95.52	−1.08
Informal votes		1,302	4.48	+1.08
Turnout		29,126		
Two-candidate-preferred result
Sharon Cadwallader Team	Sharon Cadwallader	15,455	68.06	+9.26
Greens	Kiri Dicker	7,253	31.94	+31.94
Sharon Cadwallader Team hold		Swing	N/A	

=== Bega Valley ===
2024 New South Wales mayoral elections: Bega Valley
Party	Candidate	Votes	%	±%
Labor	Helen O'Neil	5,578	24.89	+24.89
Independent	Russell Fitzpatrick	4,511	20.12	+20.12
Independents For Change	Mitchell Nadin	4,326	19.30	+19.30
Independent	Tony Allen	3,567	15.91	+15.91
Greens	Peter Haggar	2,275	10.15	+10.15
Independents For Change	David Porter	2,158	9.63	+9.63
Total formal votes		22,415	95.64	+95.64
Informal votes		1,022	4.36	+4.36
Turnout		23,437		
Two-candidate-preferred result
Independent	Russell Fitzpatrick	7,708	50.12	+50.12
Labor	Helen O'Neil	7,672	49.88	+49.88
Independent win		Swing	N/A	

- This was the first time the position of mayor of Bega Valley was directly elected instead of appointed by councillors
- Russell Fitzpatrick (Independent) was the incumbent mayor going into the 2024 election

=== Bellingen ===
2024 New South Wales mayoral elections: Bellingen
Party	Candidate	Votes	%	±%
Waterfall Way Inds	Steve Allan	5,568	67.99	
Greens	Dominic King	2,621	32.01	
Total formal votes		8,189	100.0	
Informal votes		0	0.0	
Turnout				
Waterfall Way Inds hold		Swing		

=== Broken Hill ===
2024 Broken Hill City Council election: Mayor
Party	Candidate	Votes	%	±%
For A Better Broken Hill	Tom Kennedy	7,419	70.4	
Labor	Darriea Turley	1,707	16.2	
Team Broken Hill	Dave Gallagher	1,410	13.4	
Total formal votes		10,536	96.8	
Informal votes		344	3.2	
Turnout		10,880		
Two-candidate-preferred result
For A Better Broken Hill	Tom Kennedy	7,841	80.3	
Labor	Darriea Turley	1,925	19.7	
For A Better Broken Hill hold		Swing		

=== Burwood ===
2024 New South Wales mayoral elections: Burwood
Party	Candidate	Votes	%	±%
Labor	John Faker	11,047	66.12	
Liberal	David Hull	4,226	25.29	
Unity	Guitang Lu	1,434	8.58	
Total formal votes				
Informal votes				
Turnout				
Two-candidate-preferred result
Labor hold		Swing		

=== Byron ===
2024 Byron Shire Council election: Mayor
Party	Candidate	Votes	%	±%
Greens	Sarah Ndiaye	6,522	34.7	+20.0
Labor	Asren Pugh	5,666	30.1	+18.5
Byron Shire Compass	David Warth	3,481	18.5	+18.5
Byron Independents	Michael Lyon	3,128	16.6	−7.1
Total formal votes		18,797	95.7	
Informal votes		839	4.3	
Turnout		19,636	71.4	
Two-candidate-preferred result
Greens	Sarah Ndiaye	7,582	51.8	+51.8
Labor	Asren Pugh	7,051	48.2	+48.2
Greens gain from Byron Independents				

=== Canada Bay ===
2024 New South Wales mayoral elections: Canada Bay
Party	Candidate	Votes	%	±%
Liberal	Michael Megna	22,437	46.08	
Labor	Andrew Ferguson	18,664	38.33	
Greens	Charles Jago	7,588	15.58	
Total formal votes		48,689		
Informal votes		1,704		
Turnout		50,393		
Two-candidate-preferred result
Liberal	Michael Megna	23,205	50.91	
Labor	Andrew Ferguson	22,374	49.09	
Liberal gain from Our Local Community		Swing	N/A	

=== Cessnock ===
2024 New South Wales mayoral elections: Cessnock
Party	Candidate	Votes	%	±%
Cessnock Independents	Daniel Watton	19,606	49.35	+22.10
Labor	Jay Suvaal	16,806	42.30	−0.52
Greens	Llynda Nairn	3,317	8.35	−2.63
Total formal votes		39,729	94.01	−2.18
Informal votes		2,530	3.81	+2.18
Turnout		42,259	85.44	
Two-candidate-preferred result
Cessnock Independents	Daniel Watton	20,452	53.71	+13.23
Labor	Jay Suvaal	17,624	46.29	−13.23
Cessnock Independents gain from Labor		Swing	+13.23	

=== Coffs Harbour ===
2024 New South Wales mayoral elections: Coffs Harbour
Party	Candidate	Votes	%	±%
Team Nikki	Nikki Williams	15,411	32.76	+32.76
Team Moose	Paul Amos	12,591	26.77	+2.33
Labor	Tony Judge	4,204	8.94	+0.64
Better Coffs Coast	George Cecato	4,066	8.64	–3.41
Together We Thrive	Tegan Swan	4,007	8.52	+8.52
Greens	Jonathon Cassell	3,546	7.54	+1.11
Independent	Rodney Fox	3,214	6.83	+6.83
Total formal votes		47,039	95.20	–1.02
Informal votes		2,373	4.80	+1.02
Turnout		49,412	83.83	+1.05
Two-candidate-preferred result
Team Nikki	Nikki Williams	19,343	55.16	+55.16
Team Moose	Paul Amos	15,721	44.84	–17.37
Team Nikki gain from Team Moose				

=== Dungog ===
2024 New South Wales mayoral elections: Dungog
Party	Candidate	Votes	%	±%
Independent	Digby Rayward	1,884	30.34	+30.34
Independent National	Michael Dowling	1,603	25.81	+25.81
Independent	John Connors	1,540	24.80	+24.80
Independent	Karen Drinan	1,183	19.05	+19.05
Total formal votes		6,210	94.52	+94.52
Informal votes		360	5.48	+5.48
Turnout		6,570		
Independent	Digby Rayward	2,307	53.32	+53.32
Independent National	Michael Dowling	2,020	46.68	+46.68
Independent win		Swing	N/A	

- This was the first time the position of mayor of Dungog was directly elected instead of appointed by councillors
- John Connors (Independent) was the incumbent mayor going into the 2024 election

=== Eurobodalla ===
2024 New South Wales mayoral elections: Eurobodalla
Party	Candidate	Votes	%	±%
Advance Eurobodalla	Mathew Hatcher	9,467	37.34	
Team Pollock	Rob Pollock	4,297	16.95	
One Eurobodalla	Phil Constable	3,726	14.70	
Labor	Sharon Winslade	2,321	9.16	
The Mayne Team	Anthony Mayne	2,136	8.43	
Greens	Colleen Turner	1,527	6.02	
Independent	Claire McAsh	1,276	5.03	
Independent	Mick Johnson	601	2.37	
Total formal votes		25,351		
Informal votes		1,445		
Turnout		26,796		
Two-candidate-preferred result
Advance Eurobodalla	Mathew Hatcher	11,570	69.32	
Team Pollock	Rob Pollock	5,121	30.68	
Advance Eurobodalla hold		Swing		

=== Fairfield ===
2024 Fairfield City Council election: Mayor
Party	Candidate	Votes	%	±%
Frank Carbone	Frank Carbone	89,562	81.4	+7.9
Labor	Basim Shamaon	20,512	18.6	−7.9
Total formal votes		110,074	95.1	
Informal votes		5,705	4.9	
Turnout		115,779		
Frank Carbone hold		Swing	+7.9	

=== Griffith ===
2024 New South Wales mayoral elections: Griffith
Party	Candidate	Votes	%	±%
Independent	Doug Curran	7,117	50.79	–16.35
Independent	Anne Napoli	6,896	49.21	+31.31
Total formal votes		14,013	95.41	–0.37
Informal votes		674	4.59	+0.37
Turnout		14,687	86.53	+1.6
Doug Curran hold				

=== Hornsby ===
2024 New South Wales mayoral elections: Hornsby
Party	Candidate	Votes	%	±%
Liberal	Warren Waddell	36,249	41.66	–15.62
Labor	Janelle McIntosh	18,699	19.42	
Independent	Nathan Tilbury	15,175	17.44	
Independent	Roger Woodward	2,421	2.78	
Greens	Tania Salitra	16,260	18.69	−24.03
Total formal votes		87,004	96.84	–0.73
Informal votes		2,838	3.16	+0.73
Turnout		89,842	87.94	–0.51
Two-party-preferred result
Liberal	Warren Waddell	40,007	61.68	+4.40
Labor	Janelle McIntosh	24,856	38.32	N/A
Liberal hold		Swing		

=== Hunter's Hill ===
2024 New South Wales mayoral elections: Hunter's Hill
Party	Candidate	Votes	%	±%
Liberal	Zac Miles	5,250	62.19	+22.33
Team Ross	Ross Williams	3,192	37.81	+10.13
Total formal votes		8,442	97.54	+0.06
Informal votes		213	2.46	–0.06
Turnout		8,655	85.42	–1.04
Liberal hold		Swing		

=== Kempsey ===
2024 New South Wales mayoral elections: Kempsey
Party	Candidate	Votes	%	±%
Greens	Arthur Bain	3,662	20.12	+5.47
Independent	Charanjit Bedi	2,111	11.60	
Independent	Dean Saul	2,449	13.45	+4.91
Independent	Troy Irwin	1,350	7.42	+0.2
Independent	Simon Fergusson	3,618	19.88	
Independent	Kinne Ring	5,012	27.54	
Total formal votes		18,202	92.66	−2.54
Informal votes		1,442	7.34	+2.54
Turnout		19,664	81.77	+0.56
Two-candidate-preferred result
Independent	Simon Fergusson	5,105	46.33	
Independent	Kinne Ring	5,914	53.67	
Independent gain from Independent		Swing		

=== Lake Macquarie ===
2024 Lake Macquarie City Council election: Mayor
Party	Candidate	Votes	%	±%
Labor	Adam Shultz	47,167	35.3	–17.7
Liberal	Melody Harding	28,857	21.6	–0.5
Lake Mac Independents	Kate Warner	26,713	20.0	+7.6
Greens	Bryce Ham	13,119	9.8	+9.8
Community First Inds	Rosmairi Dawson	10,473	7.8	–4.6
Our Local Community	John Gilbert	7,468	5.6	+5.6
Total formal votes		141,648	94.5	–1.6
Informal votes		7,851	5.5	+1.6
Turnout		149,499	85.2	+0.6
Two-candidate-preferred result
Labor	Adam Shultz	54,862	60.1	–9.1
Lake Mac Independents	Kate Warner	36,336	39.9	+39.9
Labor hold				

Distribution of preferences: Lake Macquarie City Mayor
Party	Candidate	Votes	Round 1		Round 2		Round 3		Round 4	
Party	Candidate	Votes	Dist.	Total	Dist.	Total	Dist.	Total	Dist.	Total
Labor	Adam Shultz	47,167	409	47,576	591	48,167	4,339	52,506	2,356	54,862
Liberal	Melody Harding	28,857	367	29,224	432	29,656	864	30,520	Excluded	
Lake Mac Independents	Kate Warner	26,713	801	27,514	2,465	29,979	1,807	31,786	4,550	36,336
Greens	Bryce Ham	13,119	206	13,325	594	13,919	Excluded			
Community First Inds	Rosmairi Dawson	10,473	620	11,093	Excluded					
Our Local Community	John Gilbert	7,468	Excluded							

=== Lismore ===
2024 New South Wales mayoral elections: Lismore
Party	Candidate	Votes	%	±%
Steve Krieg for Lismore	Steve Krieg	12,689	48.9	
Greens	Vanessa Grindon-Ekins	5,407	20.9	
Labor	Harper Dalton-Earls	3,509	13.5	
Independent	Big Rob	3,073	11.9	
Independent	John Jenkins	1,249	4.8	
Total formal votes		25,927	96.9	
Informal votes		825	3.1	
Turnout		26,752	83.7	
Two-candidate-preferred result
Steve Krieg for Lismore	Steve Krieg	14,209	66.2	
Greens	Vanessa Grindon-Ekins	7,241	33.8	
Steve Krieg for Lismore hold		Swing		

=== Liverpool ===
2024 Liverpool City Council election: Mayor
Party	Candidate	Votes	%	±%
Liberal	Ned Mannoun	49,384	42.1	+0.3
Labor	Betty Green	30,019	25.6	−12.5
Our Local Community	Peter Ristevski	10,959	9.3	+9.3
Libertarian	Gemma Noiosi	8,809	7.5	+7.5
Independent	Michael Andjelkovic	4,819	4.1	−4.4
Community Independents	Peter Harle	4,280	3.6	−3.6
Community Voice	Deb Gurung	3,203	2.7	+2.7
Liverpool Independents	Karress Rhodes	2,664	2.3	+2.3
Independent	Michael Tierney	2,472	2.1	+2.1
Independent	Robert Aiken	773	0.7	+0.7
Total formal votes		117,382	91.5	−4.0
Informal votes		9,931	8.5	+4.0
Turnout		127,313		
Liberal	Ned Mannoun	52,369	53.4	
Labor	Betty Green	32,235	32.9	
Our Local Community	Peter Ristevski	13,469	13.7	
Liberal hold				

=== Maitland ===
2024 New South Wales mayoral elections: Maitland
Party	Candidate	Votes	%	±%
Penfold Independents	Philip Penfold	31,701	55.63	+21.36
Labor	Ben Whiting	17,473	30.66	–0.96
Greens	Campbell Knox	5,675	9.96	+6.10
Independent	Shahriar (Sean) Saffari	2,133	3.74	+1.24
Total formal votes		56,982	95.52	–1.14
Informal votes		2,670	4.48	+1.14
Turnout		59,652	86.30	–0.47
Two-candidate-preferred result
Penfold Independents	Philip Penfold	33,401	62.90	+11.56
Labor	Ben Whiting	19,702	37.10	–11.56
Penfold Independents hold		Swing	+11.56	

=== Mosman ===
2024 New South Wales mayoral elections: Mosman
Party	Candidate	Votes	%	±%
Serving Mosman	Ann Kimber	8,099	48.56	+5.56
Independent	Peter Menzies	3,720	22.30	+0.98
Mosman Better	Roy Bendall	3,352	21.18	+4.49
Labor	John Wakefield	1,327	7.96	+7.96
Total formal votes		16,678	96.99	–0.05
Informal votes		518	3.01	+0.05
Turnout		17,196	81.36	–0.71
Two-candidate-preferred result
Serving Mosman	Ann Kimber	8,827	63.16	–1.62
Independent	Simon Menzies	5,149	36.84	+1.62
Serving Mosman hold		Swing	–1.62	

=== Nambucca Valley ===
2024 New South Wales mayoral elections: Nambucca Valley
Party	Candidate	Votes	%	±%
Independent	Gary Lee	4,828	37.20	
Labor	Susan Jenvey	3,380	26.04	−5.7
Independent	Ljubov Simson	2,671	20.58	
Greens	David Jones	2,101	16.19	
Total formal votes		12,980	94.95	−2.44
Informal votes		690	5.05	+2.44
Turnout		13,670	81.67	+3.46
Two-candidate-preferred result
Independent	Gary Lee	5,495	54.12	
Labor	Susan Jenvey	4,658	45.88	+14.15
Independent hold		Swing		

=== Newcastle ===
2024 New South Wales mayoral elections: Newcastle
Party	Candidate	Votes	%	±%
Independent	Ross Kerridge	35,350	34.47	+34.47
Labor	Nuatali Nelmes	32,759	31.94	–9.96
Greens	Charlotte McCabe	15,656	15.27	+1.07
Liberal	Callum Pull	13,167	12.84	+1.14
Independent	Milton Caine	2,965	2.89	+2.89
Socialist Alliance	Steve O'Brien	2,662	2.60	+0.7
Total formal votes		102,559	96.35	–0.96
Informal votes		3,890	3.65	+0.96
Turnout		106,449	84.21	+1.16
Two-candidate-preferred result
Independent	Ross Kerridge	42,169	51.68	+51.68
Labor	Nuatali Nelmes	39,426	48.32	–11.68
Independent gain from Labor				

=== Orange ===
2024 New South Wales mayoral elections: Orange
Party	Candidate	Votes	%	±%
Independent	Tammy Greenhalgh	4,120	16.66	
Greens	David Mallard	1,316	5.32	–10.18
Independent	Melanie McDonell	2,653	10.73	
Independent	Kevin Duffy	4,847	19.61	+3.43
Labor	Jeff Whitton	2,795	11.31	+1.67
Independent	Tony Mileto	5,867	23.73	+4.44
Independent	Gerald Power	3,125	12.64	
Total formal votes		24,723	95.31	–0.54
Informal votes		1,217	4.69	+0.54
Turnout		25,940	84.24	–0.14
Two-candidate-preferred result
Independent	Tammy Greenhalgh	6,135	44.26	
Independent	Tony Mileto	7,726	55.74	+7.52
Independent gain from Team Hamling		Swing		

=== Port Macquarie-Hastings ===
2024 New South Wales mayoral elections: Port Macquarie-Hastings
Party	Candidate	Votes	%	±%
Team Roberts	Adam Roberts	21,080	37.8	−17.1 (Note: Compared with Peta Pinson (Team Pinson) at the 2021 election.)
Team Lipovac	Nik Lipovac	12,972	23.3	+17.6
Greens	Lauren Edwards	11,898	21.4	+21.4
Libertarian	Mark Hornshaw	9,758	17.5	+17.5
Total formal votes		55,708	93.5	
Informal votes		3,879	6.5	
Turnout		59,587	85.11	
Two-candidate-preferred result
Team Roberts	Adam Roberts	25,092	60.1	
Team Lipovac	Nik Lipovac	16,652	39.9	
Team Roberts gain from Team Pinson		Swing	N/A	

=== Port Stephens ===
2024 New South Wales mayoral elections: Port Stephens
Party	Candidate	Votes	%	±%
Labor	Leah Anderson	23,431	48.56%	–0.85%
Independent	Paul Le Mottee	12,472	25.85%	+25.85%
Save Port Stephens	Mark Watson	12,346	25.59%	+25.59%
Total formal votes		48,249	94.40%	−2.13%
Informal votes		2,860	5.60%	+2.13%
Turnout		51,109		
Labor	Leah Anderson	24,554	59.87%	+10.46%
Independent	Paul Le Mottee	16,458	40.13%	N/A
Labor gain from Independent		Swing	+10.46%	

=== Richmond Valley ===
2024 New South Wales mayoral elections: Richmond Valley
Party	Candidate	Votes	%	±%
Independent	Robert Mustow	6,458	46.89	−24.82
Independent	Robert Hayes	1,884	13.68	–14.61
Richmond Valley Voices	Lyndall Murray	2,892	21.00	
A Time For Change	John Walker	2,538	18.43	
Total formal votes		13,772	94.87	–0.44
Informal votes		744	5.13	+0.44
Turnout		14,516	86.81	+1.41
Two-candidate-preferred result
Richmond Valley Voices	Lyndall Murray	7,149	33.72	
Independent	Robert Mustow	3,637	66.28	–5.46
Independent hold		Swing		

=== Ryde ===
2024 New South Wales mayoral elections: Ryde
Party	Candidate	Votes	%	±%
Liberal	Trenton Brown	27,324	41.03	+41.03
Labor	Bernard Purcell	16,422	24.66	+24.66
Roy Maggio Independents	Roy Maggio	14,694	22.07	+22.07
Greens	Tina Kordrostami	8,152	12.24	+12.24
Total formal votes		66,592	96.31	
Informal votes		2,550	3.69	
Turnout		69,142	86.17	
Two-candidate-preferred result
Liberal	Trenton Brown	30,248	56.51	+56.51
Labor	Bernard Purcell	23,276	43.49	+43.49
Liberal hold		Swing	N/A	

- This was the first time the position of mayor of Ryde was directly elected instead of appointed by councillors
- Trenton Brown (Liberal) was the incumbent mayor going into the elections, having been appointed on 28 March 2024

=== Shellharbour ===
2024 New South Wales mayoral elections: Shellharbour
Party	Candidate	Votes	%	±%
Chris Homer Independents	Chris Homer	28,535	59.82	
Labor	Rob Petreski	14,411	30.21	
Independent	Paul Rankin	4,757	9.97	
Total formal votes		47,703	93.61	–1.97
Informal votes		3,257	6.39	+1.97
Turnout		50,960	85.40	–0.14
Two-candidate-preferred result
Chris Homer Independents	Chris Homer	29,802	66.61	+13.81
Labor	Rob Petreski	14,937	33.39	–13.81
Independent hold		Swing		

=== Shoalhaven ===
2024 New South Wales mayoral elections: Shoalhaven
Party	Candidate	Votes	%	±%
Shoalhaven Independents	Patricia White	30,796	46.61	+36.75
Team Tribe	Jemma Tribe	23,648	35.79	+35.79
Greens	Kaye Gartner	11,630	17.60	−16.64
Total formal votes		66,074	93.17	
Informal votes		4,844	6.83	
Turnout		70,918	82.62	
Two-candidate-preferred result
Shoalhaven Independents	Patricia White	32,348	55.27	+3.60
Team Tribe	Jemma Tribe	26,184	44.73	+44.73
Shoalhaven Independents gain from Greens				

=== Singleton ===
2024 New South Wales mayoral elections: Singleton
Party	Candidate	Votes	%	±%
Independent	Sue Moore	6,470	45.42	+8.04
Independent	Danny Thompson	5,179	36.35	+8.64
Labor	Peree Watson	2,597	18.23	–4.20
Total formal votes		14,246	95.48	–0.46
Informal votes		674	4.52	+0.46
Turnout		14,920	83.78	–0.15
Two-candidate-preferred result
Independent	Sue Moore	6,985	54.45	–0.92
Independent	Danny Thompson	5,843	45.55	+0.92
Independent hold		Swing		

=== Sydney ===
2024 New South Wales mayoral elections: Sydney
Party	Candidate	Votes	%	±%
Team Clover	Clover Moore	33,018	36.78	–6.12
Labor	Zann Maxwell	15,392	17.15	+2.45
Greens	Sylvie Ellsmore	11,617	12.94	+4.64
Liberal	Lyndon Gannon	10,857	12.09	−3.01
Weldon Independents	Yvonne Weldon	9,038	10.07	−2.03
Libertarian	Sean Masters	3,234	3.60	+3.60
We Love Sydney	Sam Danieli	3,209	3.57	+3.57
Independent	Susan Ritchie	1,798	2.00	+2.00
Socialist Alliance	Rachel Evans	918	1.02	+1.02
Independent	Baiyu Chen	686	0.76	+0.76
Total formal votes		89,767	97.71	−0.89
Informal votes		2,111	2.29	+0.89
Turnout		91,878		
Two-candidate-preferred result
Team Clover	Clover Moore	41,522	62.90	–5.00
Labor	Zann Maxwell	24,489	37.10	+5.00
Team Clover hold		Swing	–5.00	

=== The Hills ===
2024 New South Wales mayoral elections: The Hills
Party	Candidate	Votes	%	±%
Liberal	Michelle Byrne	71,520	62.31	+8.92
Labor	Immanuel Selvaraj	21,964	19.14	+4.78
Greens	Mila Kasby	21,300	18.56	+6.62
Total formal votes		114,784	96.38	–0.84
Informal votes		4,317	3.62	+0.84
Turnout		119,101	87.82	–0.52
Two-party-preferred result
Liberal	Michelle Byrne	75,293	71.74	+6.02
Labor	Ashan de Silva	29,663	28.26	–6.02
Liberal hold		Swing		

=== Uralla ===
2024 New South Wales mayoral elections: Uralla
Party	Candidate	Votes	%	±%
Independent	Robert Bell	unopposed		
Registered electors		4,699		
Independent hold		Swing	N/A	

=== Willoughby ===
2024 New South Wales mayoral elections: Willoughby
Party	Candidate	Votes	%	±%
Community Matters	Tanya Taylor	18,314	48.97	
Community Independents	Anna Greco	8,779	23.47	
Team Roy	Roy McCullagh	4,449	11.90	
Independent Labor	Hao Luo	3,653	9.77	
Independent	Jade Yu-Chun Hsueh	2,207	5.90	
Total formal votes		37,402		
Informal votes		2,168		
Turnout		39,570		
Two-candidate-preferred result
Community Matters	Tanya Taylor	19,605	66.66	
Community Independents	Anna Greco	9,804	33.34	
Community Matters hold		Swing	N/A	

=== Wollondilly ===
2024 New South Wales mayoral elections: Wollondilly
Party	Candidate	Votes	%	±%
Matt Gould Team	Matt Gould	21,413	62.68	+39.22
Experienced To Lead	Benn Banasik	5,464	15.99	+4.44
Team Purple	Paul Rogers	5,439	15.92	+15.92
Bev Spearpoint Team	Bev Spearpoint	1,845	5.40	+5.40
Total formal votes		34,161	93.22	–1.78
Informal votes		2,483	6.78	+1.78
Turnout		36,644	87.08	–2.57
Two-candidate-preferred result
Matt Gould Team	Matt Gould	22,417	78.12	+24.64
Team Purple	Paul Rogers	6,278	21.88	+21.88
Matt Gould Team hold				

=== Wollongong ===
2024 New South Wales mayoral elections: Wollongong
Party	Candidate	Votes	%	±%
Labor	Tania Brown	51,260	41.2	+12.6
Greens	Jess Whittaker	29,479	23.7	+10.7
Independent	Ryan Morris	21,705	17.4	+17.4
Ind. Sustainable Australia	Andrew Anthony	16,296	13.1	+8.0 (Note: Compared to results as an endorsed Sustainable Australia Party candidate at the 2021 election.)
Independent	Suzanne de Vive	5,751	4.6	+4.6
Total formal votes		124,491	92.6	−4.0
Informal votes		9,949	7.4	+4.0
Turnout		134,440	84.4	−0.8
Two-candidate-preferred result
Labor	Tania Brown	58,936	61.2	+12.6
Greens	Jess Whittaker	37,311	38.8	+38.8
Labor gain from Wollongong Independents		Swing	N/A	
