= Results of the 2021 New South Wales local elections in Mid North Coast =

This is a list of results for the 2021 New South Wales local elections in the Mid North Coast region.

== Bellingen ==
2021 Bellingen Shire Council election
- 4 December 2021

All 6 seats on Bellingen Shire Council (Note: Excluding the mayor, who is directly-elected.) 4 seats needed for a majority
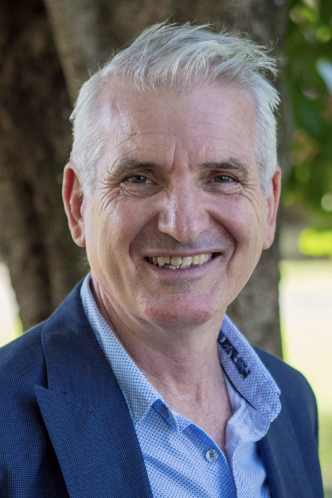
| | First party | Second party |
|---|---|---|
| | WWI |
| Leader | Steve Allan | Dominic King |
| Party | Waterfall Way Inds | Greens |
| Last election | Did not exist | 2 seats |
| Seats before | 0 | 2 |
| Seats won | 2 | 2 |
| Seat change | ▲2 | Steady |
| First preference vote | 2,800 | 2,145 |
| Percentage | 33.9% | 25.9% |
| Swing | ▲33.9 | ▼2.5 |
Largest party before election
Independents
Subsequent largest party
Waterfall Way Inds

Bellingen Shire Council is composed of six councillors elected proportionally to a single ward, as well as a directly elected mayor.

The Greens lost the mayoral election to Waterfall Way Independents (WWI) candidate Steve Allan. WWI also had two councillors elected, making it the biggest group on council.

=== Bellingen results ===
2021 New South Wales local elections: Bellingen
| Party | Candidate | Votes | % | ±% |
|---|---|---|---|---|
| Waterfall Way Inds | 1. Steve Allan; 2. Jo Brotherton; 3. Eleanor Tree; 4. Lee Grundy; 5. Janette Fairleigh; 6. Steve Ryan | 2,800 | 33.9 | +33.9 |
| Greens | 1. Dominic King; 2. Jennie Fenton; 3. Alison Heeley; 4. Toni Wright-Turner | 2,145 | 25.9 | −2.5 |
| Team Joanne Cook | 1. Joanne Cook; 2. Graeme Shephard; 3. Tabitha Vanzanten; 4. Christopher Shirley; 5. Philip Kennedy | 1,163 | 14.1 | |
| Stephen Glyde Group | 1. Stephen Glyde; 2. Vanessa Machon; 3. James Anderson | 990 | 12.0 | |
| Labor | 1. Andrew Woodward; 2. Paul Hemphill; 3. Paul Mulally; 4. Danielle Matignier-Babb | 838 | 10.1 | |
| Independent | 1. Steve Klipin; 2. Boaz Keeda; 3. Robin Ashley | 334 | 4.0 | |
| Total formal votes | | 8,270 | 95.9 | |
| Informal votes | | 352 | 4.1 | |
| Turnout | | 8,622 | 83.8 | |

== Coffs Harbour ==
2021 Coffs Harbour City Council election
- 4 December 2021
- All 8 seats on Coffs Harbour City Council; 5 seats needed for a majority
| Party | Vote % | Seats | +/– |
|---|---|---|---|
| Team Moose | 22.6% | 2 | |
| Together We'll Fix It | 14.5% | 1 | |
| Coffs Coast First | 14.2 | 1 | |
| Independent National | 10.6 | 1 | |
| Labor | 10.6 | 1 | |
| Independent (Group F) | 9.3 | 1 | |
| Greens | 9.0 | 1 | |
This lists parties that won seats. See the complete results below.
| Largest party before | Subsequent largest party |
|---|---|
| | Team Moose |

| Elected councillor | Party |
|---|---|
| Scott Wolgamot | Team Moose |
| George Cecato | Coffs Coast First |
| Rodger Pryce | TWFI |
| Tegan Swan | Ind. National |
| Tony Judge | Labor |
| Julie Sechi | Team Moose |
| Jonathan Cassell | Greens |
| Sally Townley | Independent (Group F) |

2021 New South Wales local elections: Coffs Harbour
| Party | Candidate | Votes | % | ±% |
|---|---|---|---|---|
| Team Moose | | 9,838 | 22.6 | |
| Together We'll Fix It | | 6,316 | 14.5 | |
| Coffs Coast First | | 6,192 | 14.2 | |
| Independent National | | 4,638 | 10.6 | |
| Labor | | 4,623 | 10.6 | |
| Independent (Group F) | | 4,047 | 9.3 | |
| Greens | | 3,933 | 9.0 | |
| Independent (Group E) | | 1,743 | 4.0 | |
| Independent (Group A) | | 1,704 | 3.9 | |
| Independent | Donna Pike | 413 | 0.9 | |
| Liberal Democrats | | 140 | 0.3 | |
| Total formal votes | | 43,587 | 92.7 | |
| Informal votes | | 3,410 | 7.3 | |
| Turnout | | 46,997 | 82.9 | |

== Kempsey ==
2021 New South Wales local elections: Kempsey
| Party | Candidate | Votes | % | ±% |
|---|---|---|---|---|
| Independent | 1. Simon Fergusson (elected); 2. Joshua Freeman (elected); 3. Amber Piercy; 4. Daniel Freeman | 3,440 | 21.2 | |
| Independent | Liz Campbell (elected) | 1,912 | 11.8 | |
| Independent | 1. Vijay Craigie (elected); 2. Kevin Thorne; 3. Mark Shanney; 4. Leslie Freeman | 1,886 | 11.6 | |
| Greens | Arthur Bain (elected) | 1,649 | 10.2 | |
| Independent | Alexandra Wyatt (elected) | 1,299 | 8.0 | |
| Independent | Kerri Riddington (elected) | 934 | 5.8 | |
| Independent | Kinne Ring | 704 | 4.3 | |
| Independent | Dean Saul | 685 | 4.2 | |
| Independent | Mark Baxter | 618 | 3.8 | |
| Independent | Anthony Patterson (elected) | 558 | 3.4 | |
| Independent SFF | Troy Irwin | 537 | 3.3 | |
| Independent | Sue McGinn | 509 | 3.1 | |
| Independent | Byron Fegan | 416 | 2.6 | |
| Independent | Bruce Raeburn | 397 | 2.5 | |
| Independent | Andrew Evans | 331 | 2.0 | |
| Independent | Noel Selby | 329 | 2.0 | |
| Total formal votes | | 16,204 | 87.6 | |
| Informal votes | | 2,289 | 12.4 | |
| Turnout | | 18,493 | 81.3 | |

- Election re-run in July 2022 after the New South Wales Electoral Commission's online voting system crashed

== Nambucca Valley ==
2021 Nambucca Valley Council election
- 4 December 2021

All 8 seats on Nambucca Valley Council 5 seats needed for a majority
| | First party | Second party |
|---|---|---|
| | IND |
| Leader | N/A | Susan Jenvey |
| Party | Independents | Labor |
| Seats won | 7 | 1 |
| First preference vote | 10,059 | 1,984 |
| Percentage | 83.5% | 16.5% |
Largest party before election
Independents
Subsequent largest party
Independents

Nambucca Valley Council is composed of eight councillors elected proportionally to a single ward, as well as a directly elected mayor.

=== Nambucca Valley results ===
2021 New South Wales local elections: Nambucca Valley
| Party | Candidate | Votes | % | ±% |
|---|---|---|---|---|
| Independent | Rhonda Hoban | 5,161 | 42.9 | |
| Labor | Susan Jenvey (elected) | 1,984 | 16.5 | |
| Independent | James Angel (elected) | 828 | 6.9 | |
| Independent | Ricky Buchanan (elected) | 602 | 5.0 | |
| Independent | Trevor Ballangarry (elected) | 524 | 4.4 | |
| Independent | David Hall | 498 | 4.1 | |
| Independent | David Jones (elected) | 415 | 3.4 | |
| Independent | Martin Ballangarry (elected) | 414 | 3.4 | |
| Independent | Barry Clow | 365 | 3.0 | |
| Independent | Peter Sobey | 352 | 2.9 | |
| Independent | Michael Scafidi | 345 | 2.9 | |
| Independent | Troy Vance (elected) | 342 | 2.8 | |
| Independent | John Wilson (elected) | 213 | 1.8 | |
| Total formal votes | | 12,043 | 93.9 | |
| Informal votes | | 783 | 6.1 | |
| Turnout | | 12,826 | 80.4 | |

== Port Macquarie-Hastings ==
| Elected councillor | Party |
|---|---|
| Adam Roberts | Team Pinson |
| Danielle Maltman | Team Pinson |
| Josh Slade | Team Pinson |
| Sharon Griffiths | Team Pinson |
| Lisa Intemann | Fighters |
| Rachel Sheppard | Sheppard Team |
| Lauren Edwards | Greens |
| Nik Lipovac | Hastings First |

2021 New South Wales local elections: Port Macquarie-Hastings
| Party | Candidate | Votes | % | ±% |
|---|---|---|---|---|
| Team Pinson | | 24,571 | 46.8 | |
| Fighters For Our Region | | 9,077 | 17.3 | |
| The Sheppard Team for Sensible, Sustainable Progress | | 8,046 | 15.3 | |
| Greens | | 4,704 | 9.0 | |
| Hastings First | | 4,398 | 8.4 | |
| Independent | Jon Bailey | 1,721 | 3.3 | |
| Total formal votes | | 52,517 | 92.3 | |
| Informal votes | | 4,402 | 7.7 | |
| Turnout | | 56,919 | 85.6 | |
