= 2017 Port Macquarie-Hastings mayoral by-election =

← 2016	29 July 2017	2021 →
	First party	Second party	Third party
	IND	IND	IND
Candidate	Peta Pinson	Robert Turner	Lisa Intemann
Party	Independent	Independent	Independent
Popular vote	17,590	14,313	10,491
Percentage	36.07%	29.35%	21.51%
2CP	51.07%	48.93%
Mayor before election
Peter Besseling
Independent
Subsequent Mayor
Peta Pinson
Independent

The 2017 Port Macquarie-Hastings mayoral by-election was held on 29 July 2017 to elect a new mayor of Port Macquarie-Hastings, a local government area in New South Wales, Australia.

The by-election was held following the resignation of mayor Peter Besseling, who resigned on 8 May 2017 just months after being re-elected at the 2016 election.

Peta Pinson was elected mayor with 51.07% of the vote after preferences.

== Results ==
2017 Port Macquarie-Hastings mayoral by-election
Party	Candidate	Votes	%	±%
Independent	Peta Pinson	17,590	36.07	
Independent	Robert Turner	14,313	29.35	
Independent	Lisa Intemann	10,491	21.51	
Independent	Sharon Griffiths	3,463	7.10	
Greens	Lauren Edwards	2,914	5.97	
Total formal votes		48,771	95.83	
Informal votes		2,124	4.17	
Turnout		50,895		
Two-candidate-preferred result
Independent	Peta Pinson	20,823	51.07	
Independent	Robert Turner	19,950	48.93	
Independent hold		Swing		
