= 2022 New South Wales local elections =

- 30 July 2022

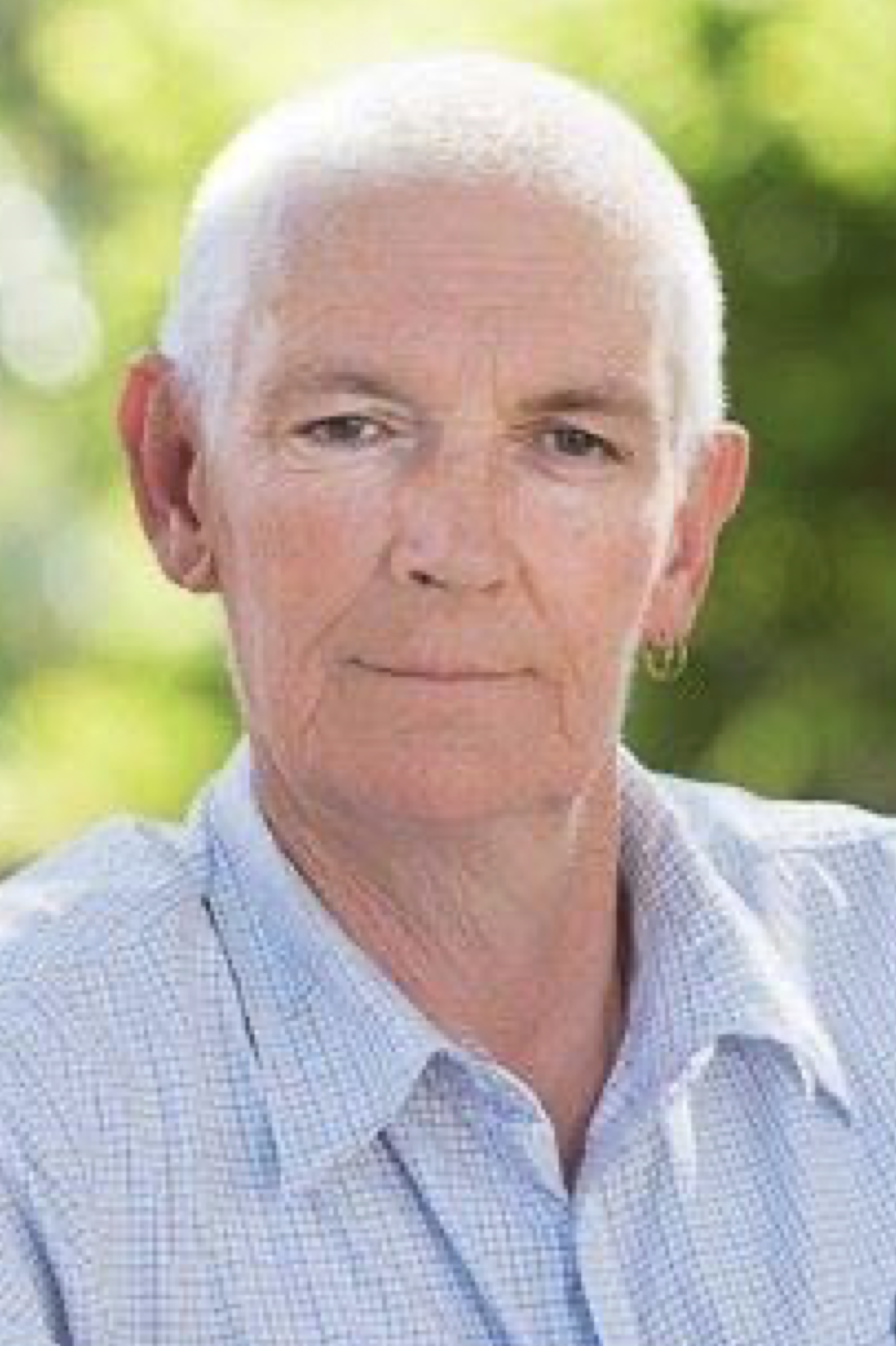
	First party	Second party	Third party
	IND
Leader	N/A	N/A	Arthur Bain
Party	Independents	Labor	Greens
Seats won	14	3	1
Seat change	▼1	▲1	Steady

The 2022 New South Wales local elections were held on 30 July 2022 to elect councillors in three local government areas (LGAs) in New South Wales, Australia. The elections were held as a re-run after the New South Wales Electoral Commission's online voting system crashed at the 2021 local elections.

== Background ==
At the 2021 elections, the NSW Electoral Commission (NSWEC) used an online voting system, iVote, in a number of LGAs. Analysis commissioned by the NSWEC found 55 voters in Singleton, 54 in Shellharbour and 34 voters in Kempsey who attempted to use iVote were prevented from casting their vote.

On 5 April 2022, the Supreme Court of NSW ordered new elections in all three councils. The mayoral elections in were not affected, nor were the results in Shellharbour's B Ward, C Ward and D Ward.

Analysis showed there was a 60% chance that the wrong candidate had been selected by voters in the affected areas.

== Results ==
=== Kempsey ===
2022 New South Wales local elections: Kempsey (Note: Changes compared with the results at the 2021 elections.)
Party	Candidate	Votes	%	±%
Quota		1,890		
Independent	1. Dean Saul (elected 3); 2. Scott Butterfield (elected 5); 3. Michael Vella; 4. George Thring	3,843	22.60	+18.40
Greens	1. Arthur Bain (elected 1); 2. Dianne Nolan; 3. Caroline George; 4. Graeme Carrad	3,246	19.90	+9.70
Independent	1. Simon Fergusson (elected 2); 2. Joshua Freeman; 3. Daniel Freeman; 4. Margaret Moir	2,099	12.35	−8.85
Independent	Anthony Patterson (elected 4)	1,909	11.23	+7.83
Independent	Kerri Riddington (elected 7)	1,562	9.19	+3.39
Independent	Alexandra Wyatt (elected 6)	1,537	9.04	+1.04
Independent	Kinne Ring (elected 8)	1,234	7.26	+2.96
Independent	Noel Selby	753	4.43	+1.43
Independent SFF	Troy Irwin	507	2.98	−0.32
Independent	Bruce Raeburn	119	0.70	−1.80
Independent	Andrew Evans	102	0.60	+1.40
Independent	Stephen McNamara	91	0.54	+0.54
Total formal votes		17,002	92.82	+5.22
Informal votes		1,315	7.18	−5.22
Turnout		18,317	78.50	−2.80

=== Shellharbour (A Ward) ===
2022 New South Wales local elections: Shellharbour (A Ward)
Party	Candidate	Votes	%	±%
Quota		4,204		
Independent	1. Kellie Marsh (elected 1); 2. Shane Bitschkat	7,185	56.98	−9.62
Labor	1. Maree Edwards (elected 2); 2. Aarron Vann	3,579	28.38	−5.02
Independent Labor	1. Marianne Saliba; 2. Liz Kemp	1,845	14.63	+14.63
Total formal votes		12,609	95.19	−0.21
Informal votes		637	4.81	+0.21
Turnout		13,246	81.11	−6.89

=== Singleton ===
2022 Singleton Council election
- 14 September 2024

All 9 seats on Singleton Council (Note: Excluding the mayor, who is directly-elected.) 6 seats needed for a majority
	First party	Second party	Third party
	IND		SFF
Party	Independents	Labor	Shooters, Fishers and Farmers
Seats won	6	2	1
First preference vote	7,864	2,443	2,168
Percentage	63.04%	19.58%	17.38%
Largest party before election
Independents
Largest party after election
Independents

2022 New South Wales local elections: Singleton
Party	Candidate	Votes	%	±%
Independent	Danny Thompson (elected 3)	2,208	17.70	+0.00
Shooters, Fishers, Farmers	Mel McLachlan (elected 1)	2,168	17.38	+6.98
Labor	Tony Jarrett (elected 4)	1,557	12.48	+0.08
Independent	Godfrey Adamthwaite (elected 1)	1,270	10.18	+3.08
Labor	Sarah Johnstone (elected 5)	886	7.10	+3.60
Independent	Hollee Jenkins (elected 8)	853	6.84	+2.57
Independent	Val Scott (elected 7)	847	6.79	+3.99
Independent	Sue George (elected 6)	782	6.27	+3.97
Independent	Tony McNamara (elected 9)	494	3.96	+1.46
Independent	Belinda Charlton	480	3.85	−2.15
Independent	Kay Sullivan	406	3.25	+0.95
Independent	Shane Feeney	330	2.65	+2.65
Independent	Wayne Riley	194	1.56	+1.56
Total formal votes		12,475	94.09	+5.19
Informal votes		784	5.91	−5.19
Turnout		13,259	76.70	−7.30

== Aftermath ==
In Kempsey, the highest placed non-elected candidate from 2021, Dean Saul, was instead one the first councillors elected.

All councillors in Singleton were re-elected with the exception of independent Belinda Charlton, who was defeated by Labor's Sarah Johnstone.

As a result of the re-runs, the New South Wales Electoral Commission opted not to use iVote for the 2023 state election as was initially proposed.
