= Conservative Party of Australia =

Defunct political party in Australia

- Leader: Fast Bucks
- Founder: Fast Bucks
- Founded: 1984
- Registered: 23 October 1984
- Dissolved: 1998
- Headquarters: Byron Bay, New South Wales

The Conservative Party of Australia was a registered political party in 1984, but was deregistered by the AEC on 21 October 1998 as membership had fallen below the required 500 members.

The party was established by Fast Bucks (formerly John Christopher Anderson and born Johannes Van De Knapp), who ran a banana and avocado farm in Byron Bay, New South Wales. It primarily campaigned on environmental issues and derived its name from conservation rather than conservatism. Bucks stated that the party's name was "as honest as the Labor Party representing the workers, the Liberal Party representing liberality, or the National Party representing the national interest".

Although its "world headquarters" were in Byron Bay, the party chose to run in Queensland at the 1984 federal election, standing for the Senate. During the campaign, Bucks was charged with cultivating marijuana and remanded in custody by the Byron Bay Magistrates Court. It was reported that he had a long criminal record in Victoria, including convictions for assault, resisting arrest, larceny and criminal damage.
