= List of mayors of Wollondilly =

Mayor of Wollondilly
- Incumbent; Matt Gould since 4 December 2021
- Style: His Worship, The Mayor of Wollondilly Shire
- Appointer: Wollondilly Shire Council
- Term length: 4 years
- Deputy: Matthew Deeth

This is a list of the mayors of Wollondilly Shire, a local government area of New South Wales, Australia. The position was known as the shire president until 1 July 1993.

The current mayor is Matt Gould, who was elected in December 2021.

== Mayors ==
#	Chairman	Term start	Term end	Time in office	Total time served	Notes
1	George Macarthur-Onslow	15 June 1906	3 December 1906	171 days	5 years, 121 days	
#	Shire President	Term start	Term end	Time in office		Notes
–	George Macarthur-Onslow	3 December 1906	11 January 1907	39 days	–	
2	John Edward Moore	11 January 1907	13 February 1908	1 year, 33 days	9 years, 240 days	
3	James Oswald Moore	13 February 1908	3 June 1909	1 year, 110 days	1 year, 110 days	
4	Alfred Leonard Bennett	8 June 1909	3 October 1913	4 years, 117 days	4 years, 117 days	
–	John Edward Moore	7 October 1913	12 February 1915	1 year, 128 days	–	
5	Charles Green Moore	12 February 1915	21 September 1918	3 years, 221 days	3 years, 221 days	
–	John Edward Moore	25 September 1918	11 December 1925	7 years, 77 days	–	
6	Edgar Henry Kirk Downes	11 December 1925	10 December 1926	364 days	11 years, 138 days	
–	George Macarthur-Onslow	10 December 1926	12 September 1931	4 years, 276 days	–	
7	George Joseph Spearing	18 September 1931	18 December 1931	91 days	91 days	
–	Edgar Henry Kirk Downes	18 December 1931	4 December 1936	4 years, 352 days	–	
8	Eric Moore	4 December 1936	7 December 1938	2 years, 3 days	3 years, 225 days	
–	Edgar Henry Kirk Downes	7 December 1938	13 December 1939	1 year, 6 days	–	
9	Septimus Ernest Prosser	13 December 1939	17 December 1941	2 years, 4 days	2 years, 4 days	
–	Edgar Henry Kirk Downes	17 December 1941	10 May 1946	4 years, 144 days	–	
–	Eric Moore	10 May 1946	18 December 1947	1 year, 222 days	–	
10	Lachlan Nicholson	18 December 1947	14 December 1950	2 years, 361 days	2 years, 361 days	
11	Percy William Early	14 December 1950	17 December 1953	3 years, 3 days	3 years, 3 days	
12	Murrum Edward Sweet	17 December 1953	19 December 1957	4 years, 2 days	4 years, 2 days	
13	Roy Ernest Middleton	19 December 1957	17 September 1977	19 years, 272 days	19 years, 272 days	
14	Francis William McKay AM MBE	17 September 1977	30 June 1993	15 years, 286 days	16 years, 9 days	
#	Mayor	Term start	Term end	Time in office		Notes
–	Francis William McKay AM MBE	1 July 1993	27 September 1993	88 days	–	
15	Charles John Desmond Ayliffe	27 September 1993	26 September 1994	364 days	364 days	
16	Christine Towndrow	26 September 1994	23 September 1996	1 year, 363 days	3 years, 361 days	
17	Marina Voncina	23 September 1996	28 September 1998	2 years, 5 days	2 years, 5 days	
–	Christine Towndrow	28 September 1998	27 September 1999	364 days	–	
18	Helen Kuiper	27 September 1999	25 September 2000	364 days	364 days	
–	Christine Towndrow	25 September 2000	24 September 2001	364 days	–	
19	Colin Mitchell	24 September 2001	15 April 2004	2 years, 204 days	6 years, 207 days	
20	Michael Banasik	15 April 2004	19 September 2005	1 year, 157 days	3 years, 164 days	
21	Phil Costa	19 September 2005	16 April 2007	1 year, 209 days	1 year, 209 days	
22	Judith Hannan	16 April 2007	13 September 2008	1 year, 150 days	3 years, 232 days	
–	Michael Banasik	13 September 2008	21 September 2009	1 year, 8 days	–	
–	Colin Mitchell	21 September 2009	20 September 2010	364 days	–	
–	Michael Banasik	20 September 2010	19 September 2011	364 days	–	
–	Colin Mitchell	19 September 2011	16 September 2013	1 year, 362 days	–	
22	Benn Banasik	17 September 2013	15 September 2014	364 days	364 days	
–	Colin Mitchell	15 September 2014	21 September 2015	1 year, 6 days	–	
23	Simon Landow	21 September 2015	26 September 2016	1 year, 5 days	1 year, 5 days	
–	Judy Hannan	26 September 2016	17 December 2018	2 years, 82 days	–	
24	Matthew Deeth	17 December 2018	15 September 2020	1 year, 273 days	1 year, 273 days	
25	Robert Khan	15 September 2020	21 December 2021	1 year, 97 days	1 year, 97 days	
26	Matt Gould	21 December 2021	Present	4 years, 260 days	4 years, 260 days	

== Election results ==
=== 2024 ===
2024 New South Wales mayoral elections: Wollondilly
Party	Candidate	Votes	%	±%
Matt Gould Team	Matt Gould	21,413	62.68	+39.22
Experienced To Lead	Benn Banasik	5,464	15.99	+4.44
Team Purple	Paul Rogers	5,439	15.92	+15.92
Bev Spearpoint Team	Bev Spearpoint	1,845	5.40	+5.40
Total formal votes		34,161	93.22	–1.78
Informal votes		2,483	6.78	+1.78
Turnout		36,644	87.08	–2.57
Two-candidate-preferred result
Matt Gould Team	Matt Gould	22,417	78.12	+24.64
Team Purple	Paul Rogers	6,278	21.88	+21.88
Matt Gould Team hold				

=== 2021 ===
2021 New South Wales mayoral elections: Wollondilly
Party	Candidate	Votes	%	±%
Independent	Matt Gould	7,355	23.5	+23.5
Independent	Judy Hannan	6,260	20.0	+20.0
Independent	Ray Law	5,326	17.0	+17.0
Independent	Matthew Deeth	5,190	16.6	+16.6
Independent	Michael Banasik	3,621	11.5	+11.5
Independent	Robert Khan	3,603	11.5	+11.5
Total formal votes		31,355	95.0	+95.0
Informal votes		1,650	5.0	+5.0
Turnout		33,005	90.9	+90.9
Two-candidate-preferred result
Independent	Matt Gould	9,886	53.5	+53.5
Independent	Judy Hannan	8,601	46.5	+46.5
Independent win		Swing	N/A	

- This was the first time the position of mayor of Wollondilly was directly-elected instead of appointed by councillors
- Robert Khan (Independent) was the incumbent mayor, having been appointed on 16 September 2020
