= 2021 New South Wales mayoral elections =

- 4 December 2021

34 of the 35 directly-elected mayors in New South Wales (1 elected unopposed)

	First party	Second party
	IND
Leader	N/A	N/A
Party	Independents (Note: Including local groups (not to be confused with locally-registered political parties).)	Labor
Seats won	23 mayors	4 mayors
First preference vote		344,980
	Third party	Fourth party
Leader	N/A	No leader
Party	Liberal	Greens
Seats won	4 mayors	1 mayor
First preference vote	272,164	149,971
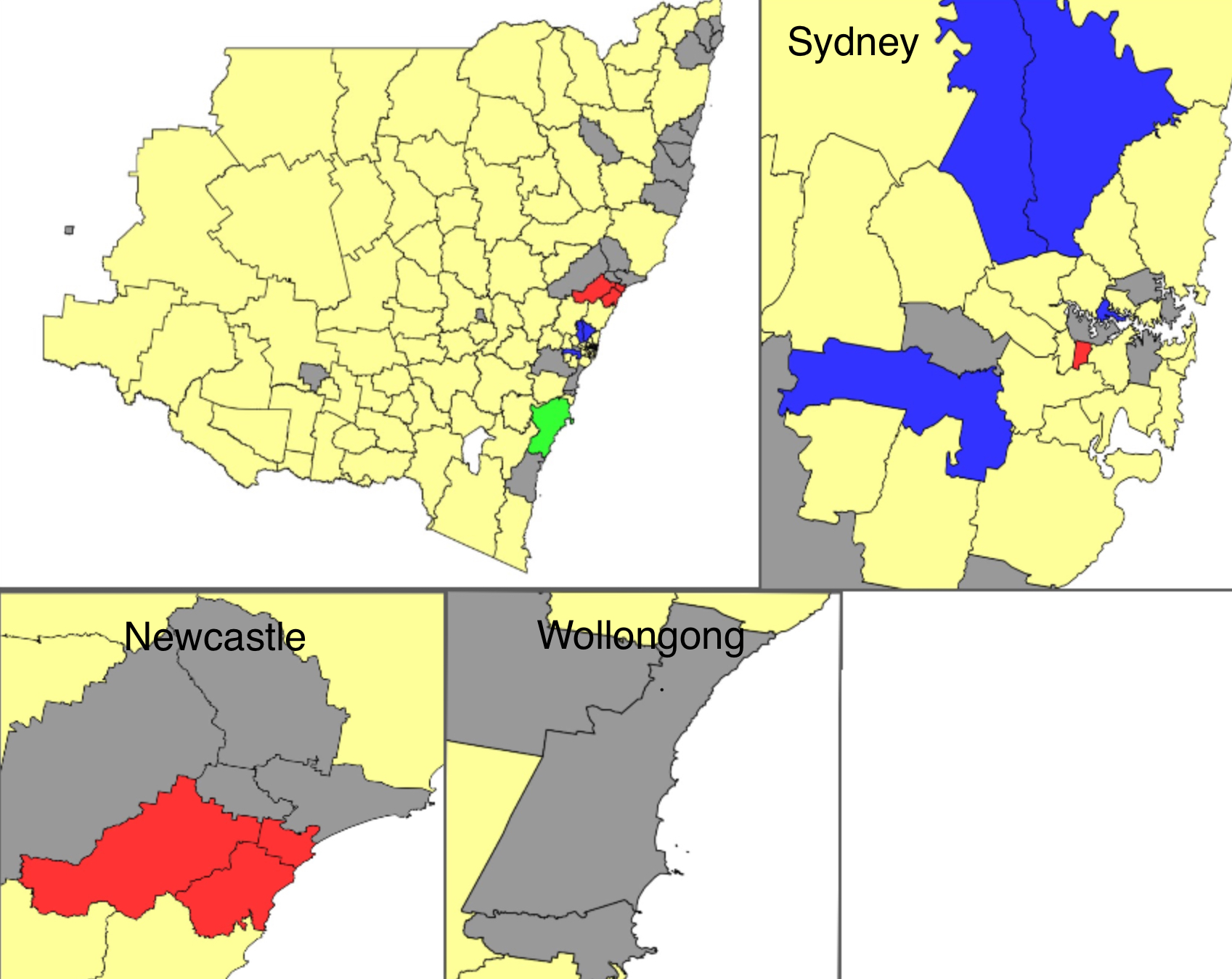
- Results by LGA

The 2021 New South Wales mayoral elections were held on 4 December 2021 to elect mayors or lord mayors to 35 of the 128 local government areas (LGAs) in New South Wales. The elections were held as part of the statewide local elections.

While most mayors in New South Wales are elected by councillors at meetings, several choose to have directly-elected (or popularly elected) mayors.

== Background ==
=== 2017 referendums ===
At the 2017 local elections, three referendum questions were put to voters about directly-elected mayors.

When asked if they supported the introduction of a directly-elected mayor in 2024 71.9% voted "Yes" in Dungog and 70.1% voted "Yes" in Shellharbour. However, voters in North Sydney voted in favour of removing directly-elected mayoral elections. All changes came into effect in 2021.

== Candidates ==
Incumbents at the time of the elections are highlighted in bold text.

LGA	Held by	Labor	Liberal	Greens	Independent	Others
Ballina	Independent	Keith Williams			Jeff Johnson; Eoin Johnston; Steve McCarthy	Sharon Cadwallader (SCT)
Bellingen	Greens	Andrew Woodward		**Dominic King**		Steve Allan (WWI)
Broken Hill	Labor	**Darriea Turley**				Tom Kennedy (FABBH); Dave Gallagher (TBH)
Burwood	Labor	**John Faker**	David Hull	Ned Cutcher		Alan Murray (MIG)
Byron	Greens	Asren Pugh		**Duncan Dey**	Cate Coorey; John Anderson; Chris McIlrath	Michael Lyon (BI); Mark Swivel (MST); Alan Hunter (BA); Bruce Clarke (BSAG)
Canada Bay	Our Local Community	Julia Little	Michael Megna	Charles Jago	Daniela Ramondino	**Angelo Tsirekas** (OLC)
Cessnock	Labor	Jay Suvaal	John Moores	Janet Murray	Ian Olsen	
Coffs Harbour	Independent	Tony Judge		Jonathan Cassell	Sally Townley; John Arkan; Donna Pike; Mike Adendorff	Paul Amos (TM); Rodger Price (TWFI); Tegan Swan (Ind. Nat); George Cecato (CCF)
Dungog	Independent				**John Connors**	
Eurobodalla	Independent Liberal	David Grace			Alison Worthington	Mat Hatcher (AE); Rob Pollock (PP); Karyn Starmer (TMT); Noel Harrison (ABC); Gary Smith (ABC)
Fairfield	Frank Carbone	George Barcha				Frank Carbone (FC)
Griffith	Independent				Doug Curran; Carmel La Rocca; Rina Mercuri; Dino Zappacosta	Anne Napoli (ANG)
Hornsby	Liberal		**Philip Ruddock**	Emma Heyde		
Hunter's Hill	Liberal	Zac Miles			David Guazzarotto; Richard Quinn	Ross Williams (TR)
Kempsey	Independent			Arthur Bain	**Liz Campbell**; Arthur Evans; Leo Hauville; Bruce Raeburn; Dean Saul	Troy Irwin (Ind. SFF)
Lake Macquarie	Labor	**Kay Fraser**	Jason Pauling		Rosmairi Dawson	Luke Cubis (LMI)
Lismore	Greens	Darlene Cook		**Vanessa Grindon-Ekins**	Big Rob	Elly Bird (OSF); Steve Krieg (SKFL); Patrick Healey (IL)
Liverpool	Labor	Nathan Hagarty	Ned Mannoun	Asm Morshed	Michael Andjelkovic	Peter Harle (LCIT)
Maitland	Labor	**Loretta Baker**	Ben Mitchell	John Brown	Brian Burke; Shahriar (Sean) Saffari	Michael Cooper (CI); Philip Penfold (PI)
Mosman	Serving Mosman				Libby Moline	Roy Bendall (RFM); **Carolyn Corrigan** (SM); Sarah Harding (VOM); Peter Menzies (MFM)
Nambucca Valley	Independent	Susan Jenvey			**Rhonda Hoban**	
Newcastle	Labor	**Nuatali Nelmes**	Jenny Barrie	John Mackenzie	Rod Holding	John Church (NI); Steve O'Brien (SA)
Orange	Independent			Neil Jones	Kevin Duffy; Lesley Smith; Amanda Spalding	Jason Hamling (TH); Tony Mileto (FOF); Jeff Whitton (Ind. ALP)
Port Macquarie-Hastings	Team Pinson				Steven Gates	Lisa Intemann (Ftrs); Nik Lipovac (HF); **Peta Pinson** (TP); Rachel Sheppard (ST)
Port Stephens	Independent	Leah Anderson			**Ryan Palmer**	
Richmond Valley	Independent				Robert Hayes; **Robert Mustow**	
Shellharbour	Labor	**Marianne Saliba**			Chris Homer	
Shoalhaven	Greens			**Amanda Findley**	Paul Green	Nina Digiglio (SCF); Mark Kitchener (SIG); Greg Watson (SIG); Patricia White (SIG)
Singleton	Independent	Tony Jarrett			Belinda Charlton; **Sue Moore**; Danny Thompson	
Sydney	Team Clover (CMIT)	Linda Scott	Shauna Jarrett	Sylvie Ellsmore		**Clover Moore** (CMIT); Angela Vithoulkas (SBP); Yvonne Weldon (UFS)
The Hills	Liberal	Ryan Tracey	**Peter Gangemi**	Vida Shahamat	Jersy Rozyck; Ereboni Yazdani	
Uralla	Independent				Robert Bell; Natasha Ledger; Isabel Strutt	
Willoughby	Independent Liberal					Craig Campbell (Ind. Lib); Angelo Rozos (Ind. Lib); Tanya Taylor (TTCM)
Wollondilly	Independent				Michael Banasik; Matthew Deeth; Matt Gould; Judy Hannan; **Robert Khan**; Ray Law	
Wollongong	Wollongong Independents	Tania Brown	John Dorahy	Mithra Cox	Marie Glykis	Andrew Anthony (SAP); **Gordon Bradbery** (WI)

=== Retiring mayors ===
- Gail Giles-Gidney (Independent Liberal) − Willoughby, announced 2021
- Bob Pynsent (Labor) − Cessnock, announced 23 June 2021
- Liz Innes (Independent Liberal) − Eurobodalla, announced 29 June 2021
- Denise Knight (Independent) − Coffs Harbour, announced 17 July 2021
- John Dal Broi (Independent) − Griffith, announced 23 July 2021
- David Wright (Independent) − Ballina, announced 5 November 2021
- Wendy Waller (Labor) − Liverpool, announced 15 November 2021
- Michael Pearce (Independent) − Uralla, announced 15 November 2021
- Reg Kid (Independent) − Orange, announced 2021

== Results ==
=== Ballina ===
2021 New South Wales mayoral elections: Ballina
Party	Candidate	Votes	%	±%
Sharon Cadwallader Team	Sharon Cadwallader	10,217	38.0	
Independent	Jeff Johnson	6,714	24.9	
Labor	Keith Williams	4,224	15.7	
Independent	Eoin Johnston	3,495	13.0	
Independent	Steve McCarthy	2,263	8.4	
Total formal votes		26,913	96.6	
Informal votes		940	3.4	
Turnout			85.3	
Two-candidate-preferred result
Sharon Cadwallader Team	Sharon Cadwallader	12,383	58.8	N/A
Independent	Esther Kennedy	8,689	41.2	N/A
Sharon Cadwallader Team gain from Independent		Swing	N/A	

=== Bellingen ===
2021 New South Wales mayoral elections: Bellingen
Party	Candidate	Votes	%	±%
Waterfall Way Inds	Steve Allan	4,954	59.2	
Greens	Dominic King	2,401	28.7	
Labor	Andrew Woodward	1,019	12.1	
Total formal votes		8,374	97.3	
Informal votes		235	2.7	
Turnout			83.7	
Waterfall Way Inds gain from Greens		Swing	N/A	

=== Broken Hill ===
2021 New South Wales mayoral elections: Broken Hill
Party	Candidate	Votes	%	±%
For A Better Broken Hill	Tom Kennedy	5,868	54.3	+30.1
Labor	Darriea Turley	2,533	23.4	−5.8
Team Broken Hill	Dave Gallagher	2,411	22.3	−6.3
Total formal votes		10,812	97.5	
Informal votes		272	2.5	
Turnout		11,084	83.1	
For A Better Broken Hill gain from Labor		Swing	N/A	

=== Burwood ===
2021 New South Wales mayoral elections: Burwood
Party	Candidate	Votes	%	±%
Labor	John Faker	10,458	58.8	+6.1
Liberal	David Hull	4,041	22.7	−1.7
Greens	Ned Cutcher	2,156	12.1	+12.1
Major Independent Group	Alan Murray	1,142	6.4	+6.4
Total formal votes		17,797	97.6	+0.6
Informal votes		435	2.4	−0.6
Turnout		18,232	86.8	+7.2
Two-party-preferred result
Labor	John Faker	11,532	72.0	
Liberal	David Hull	4,489	28.0	
Labor hold		Swing	+6.1	

=== Byron ===
2021 New South Wales mayoral elections: Byron
Party	Candidate	Votes	%	±%
Byron Independents	Michael Lyon	4,312	23.7	+23.7
Mark Swivel Team	Mark Swivel	3,286	18.1	+18.1
Greens	Duncan Dey	2,673	14.7	−34.3
Independent	Cate Coorey	2,599	14.3	+14.3
Labor	Asren Pugh	2,105	11.6	−8.6
Byron Alliance	Alan Hunter	1,296	7.1	−4.2
Byron Shire Action Group	Bruce Clarke	1,017	5.6	+5.6
Independent	John Anderson	592	3.3	+3.3
Independent	Chris McIlrath	285	1.6	+1.6
Total formal votes		18,165	97.0	
Informal votes		567	3.0	
Turnout		18,732	73.7	
Two-candidate-preferred result
Byron Independents	Michael Lyon	6,663	54.3	+54.3
Mark Swivel Team	Mark Swivel	5,603	45.7	+45.7
Byron Independents gain from Greens		Swing	N/A	

=== Canada Bay ===
2021 New South Wales mayoral elections: Canada Bay
Party	Candidate	Votes	%	±%
Our Local Community	Angelo Tsirekas	18,014	37.1	+37.1
Labor	Julia Little	13,510	27.8	−11.9
Liberal	Michael Megna	10,810	22.3	−15.0
Greens	Charles Jago	3,854	7.9	−1.3
Independent	Daniela Ramondino	2,354	4.8	−8.9
Total formal votes		48,542	97.7	+1.6
Informal votes		1,140	2.3	−1.6
Turnout		49,682	85.4	+5.1
Two-candidate-preferred result
Our Local Community	Angelo Tsirekas	22,936	57.5	+57.5
Labor	Julia Little	16,973	42.5	−12.4
Mayor changed to Our Local Community from Labor		Swing	N/A	

=== Cessnock ===
2021 New South Wales mayoral elections: Cessnock
Party	Candidate	Votes	%	±%
Labor	Jay Suvaal	15,629	42.8	−2.6
Olsen Independents	Ian Olsen	9,946	27.3	+16.0
Liberal	John Moores	6,916	18.9	−0.4
Greens	Janet Murray	4,006	11.0	+2.0
Total formal votes		36,497	96.2	
Informal votes		1,447	3.8	
Turnout		37,944	84.9	
Two-candidate-preferred result
Labor	Jay Suvaal	17,644	59.5	
Olsen Independents	Ian Olsen	12,000	40.5	
Labor hold		Swing	N/A	

=== Coffs Harbour ===
2021 New South Wales mayoral elections: Coffs Harbour
Party	Candidate	Votes	%	±%
Team Moose	Paul Amos	11,035	24.4	
Together We'll Fix It	Rodger Price	7,131	15.8	
Independent National	Tegan Swan	5,609	12.4	
Coffs Coast First	George Cecato	5,439	12.0	
Independent	Sally Townley	4,926	10.9	
Labor	Tony Judge	3,747	8.3	
Greens	Jonathan Cassell	2,903	6.4	
Independent	John Arkan	1,877	4.2	
Independent	Donna Pike	1,501	3.3	
Independent	Mike Adendorff	987	2.2	
Total formal votes		45,155	96.2	
Informal votes		1,774	3.8	
Turnout		46,929	82.8	
Team Moose	Paul Amos	15,115	62.2	
Together We'll Fix It	Rodger Price	9,180	37.8	
Team Moose gain from Independent		Swing	N/A	

=== Dungog ===
2021 New South Wales mayoral elections: Dungog
Party	Candidate	Votes	%	±%
Independent	John Connors	unopposed		
Registered electors		7,294		
Independent win		Swing	N/A	

- This was the first time the position of mayor of Dungog was directly-elected instead of appointed by councillors

=== Eurobodalla ===
2021 New South Wales mayoral elections: Eurobodalla
Party	Candidate	Votes	%	±%
Advance Eurobodalla	Mat Hatcher	5,583	21.9	
Prefer Pollock	Rob Pollock	4,555	17.8	
The Mayne Team	Karyn Starmer	4,377	17.1	
A Better Council	Noel (Tubby) Harrison	3,716	14.6	
Labor	David Grace	3,715	14.6	
Greens	Alison Worthington	2,947	11.5	
A Better Council	Gary Smith	633	2.5	
Total formal votes		25,526	95.9	
Informal votes		1,078	4.1	
Turnout		26,604	83.1	
Two-candidate-preferred result
Advance Eurobodalla	Mat Hatcher	7,797	53.8	
The Mayne Team	Karyn Starmer	6,691	46.2	
Advance Eurobodalla gain from Independent Liberal		Swing	N/A	

=== Fairfield ===
2021 New South Wales mayoral elections: Fairfield
Party	Candidate	Votes	%	±%
Frank Carbone	Frank Carbone	66,455	73.5	+23.3
Labor	George Barcha	23,974	26.5	−23.3
Total formal votes		90,429	95.1	
Informal votes		4,688	4.9	
Turnout		95,117	73.3	
Frank Carbone hold		Swing	+23.3	

=== Griffith ===
2021 New South Wales mayoral elections: Griffith
Party	Candidate	Votes	%	±%
Independent	Doug Curran	6,367	44.9	
Anne Napoli Team	Anne Napoli	2,544	17.9	
Independent	Dino Zappacosta	2,185	15.4	
Independent	Rina Mercuri	2,088	14.7	
Independent	Carmel La Rocca	995	7.0	
Total formal votes		14,179	95.8	
Informal votes		625	4.2	
Turnout		14,804	88.1	
Two-candidate-preferred result
Independent	Doug Curran	7,062	67.1	
Anne Napoli Team	Anne Napoli	3,456	32.9	
Doug Curran gain from John Dal Broi		Swing		

=== Hornsby ===
2021 New South Wales mayoral elections: Hornsby
Party	Candidate	Votes	%	±%
Liberal	Philip Ruddock	49,065	57.3	+9.5
Greens	Emma Heyde	36,591	42.7	+24.3
Total formal votes		85,656	97.6	+0.6
Informal votes		2,136	2.4	−0.6
Turnout		87,792	88.2	+2.6
Liberal hold		Swing	N/A	

=== Hunter's Hill ===
2021 New South Wales mayoral elections: Hunter's Hill
Party	Candidate	Votes	%	±%
Liberal	Zac Miles	3,331	39.9	−0.3
Team Ross	Ross Williams	2,313	27.7	−0.7
Independent	Richard Quinn	2,015	24.1	+24.1
Independent	David Guazzarotto	697	8.3	+8.3
Total formal votes		8,356	97.5	+1.0
Informal votes		216	2.5	−1.0
Turnout		8,572	86.3	+2.9
Two-candidate-preferred result
Liberal	Zac Miles	3,821	52.7	+7.1
Team Ross	Ross Williams	3,437	47.3	−7.1
Liberal gain from Team Ross		Swing	+7.1	

=== Kempsey ===
2021 New South Wales mayoral elections: Kempsey
Party	Candidate	Votes	%	±%
Independent	Liz Campbell	5,432	30.9	−33.8
Independent	Leo Hauville	4,906	27.9	+27.9
Greens	Arthur Bain	2,576	14.6	+14.6
Independent	Dean Saul	1,502	8.5	−26.8
Independent SFF	Troy Irwin	1,269	7.2	+7.2
Independent	Arthur Evans	1,009	5.7	+5.7
Independent	Bruce Raeburn	891	5.1	+5.1
Total formal votes		17,585	95.2	
Informal votes		886	4.8	
Turnout		18,471	81.2	
Two-candidate-preferred result
Independent	Leo Hauville	6,471	51.5	+51.5
Independent	Liz Campbell	6,084	48.5	
Independent gain from Independent		Swing	N/A	

=== Lake Macquarie ===
2021 New South Wales mayoral elections: Lake Macquarie
Party	Candidate	Votes	%	±%
Labor	Kay Fraser	69,105	53.0	+8.3
Liberal	Jason Pauling	28,824	22.1	+1.6
Lake Mac Independents	Luke Cubis	16,206	12.4	+7.7
Independent	Rosmairi Dawson	16,201	12.4	+12.4
Total formal votes		130,336	96.1	
Informal votes		5,265	3.9	
Turnout		135,601	84.6	
Two-candidate-preferred result
Labor	Kay Fraser	75,575	69.2	
Liberal	Jason Pauling	33,685	30.8	
Labor hold		Swing		

=== Lismore ===
2021 New South Wales mayoral elections: Lismore
Party	Candidate	Votes	%	±%
Steve Krieg for Lismore	Steve Krieg	14,432	54.5	+54.5
Greens	Vanessa Grindon-Ekins	3,962	15.0	−0.7
Labor	Darlene Cook	2,453	9.3	−20.1
Our Sustainable Future	Elly Bird	3,165	12.0	+12.0
Independent	Big Rob	1,468	5.5	+2.4
Independent Lismore	Patrick Healey	994	3.8	+3.8
Total formal votes		26,474	97.9	
Informal votes		570	2.1	
Turnout		27,044	85.8	
Steve Krieg for Lismore gain from Labor		Swing	N/A	

- Incumbent mayor Isaac Smith (Labor) resigned on 31 January 2021, with Vanessa Grindon-Ekins (Greens) serving the remainder of his term from 9 February 2021

=== Liverpool ===
2021 New South Wales mayoral elections: Liverpool
Party	Candidate	Votes	%	±%
Liberal	Ned Mannoun	48,112	41.8	+9.1
Labor	Nathan Hagarty	43,870	38.1	+0.0
Independent	Michael Andjelkovic	9,770	8.5	+8.5
Community Independents	Peter Harle	8,254	7.2	−2.7
Greens	Asm Morshed	5,171	4.5	+0.4
Total formal votes		115,177	95.5	
Informal votes		5,479	4.5	
Turnout		120,656	84.1	
Two-party-preferred result
Liberal	Ned Mannoun	51,277	51.3	
Labor	Nathan Hagarty	48,741	48.7	
Liberal gain from Labor		Swing		

=== Maitland ===
2021 New South Wales mayoral elections: Maitland
Party	Candidate	Votes	%	±%
Penfold Independents	Philip Penfold	18,569	34.3	+6.1
Labor	Loretta Baker	17,133	31.6	+0.2
Liberal	Ben Mitchell	7,888	14.6	−2.7
Greens	John Brown	3,715	6.9	+2.1
Cooper Independents	Michael Cooper	3,427	6.3	+6.3
Independent	Brian Burke	2,096	3.9	−4.9
Independent	Shahriar (Sean) Saffari	1,353	2.5	+2.5
Total formal votes		54,181	96.7	+0.8
Informal votes		1,875	3.3	−0.8
Turnout		56,056	87.6	+3.4
Two-candidate-preferred result
Penfold Independents	Philip Penfold	22,127	51.3	+6.1
Labor	Loretta Baker	20,976	48.7	−6.1
Penfold Independents gain from Labor		Swing	+6.1	

=== Mosman ===
2021 New South Wales mayoral elections: Mosman
Party	Candidate	Votes	%	±%
Serving Mosman	Carolyn Corrigan	7,062	43.0	+0.6
Menzies For Mayor	Peter Menzies	3,501	21.3	+1.6
Residents For Mosman	Roy Bendall	2,741	16.7	−11.6
Independent	Libby Moline	2,319	14.1	+1.0
Voice of Mosman	Sarah Harding	802	4.9	+4.9
Total formal votes		16,425	97.0	
Informal votes		501	3.0	
Turnout		16,926	82.1	
Two-candidate-preferred result
Serving Mosman	Carolyn Corrigan	8,000	64.8	+7.9
Menzies For Mayor	Peter Menzies	4,349	35.2	+35.2
Serving Mosman hold		Swing	N/A	

=== Nambucca Valley ===
2021 New South Wales mayoral elections: Nambucca Valley
Party	Candidate	Votes	%	±%
Independent	Rhonda Hoban	8,522	68.3	−6.4
Labor	Susan Jenvey	3,960	31.7	+31.7
Total formal votes		12,464	97.4	
Informal votes		334	2.6	
Turnout		12,130	80.2	
Independent hold		Swing	−6.4	

=== Newcastle ===
2021 New South Wales mayoral elections: Newcastle
Party	Candidate	Votes	%	±%
Labor	Nuatali Nelmes	42,052	41.9	−0.6
Newcastle Independents	John Church	27,329	27.3	+27.3
Greens	John Mackenzie	14,256	14.2	+0.9
Liberal	Jenny Barrie	11,683	11.7	−1.3
Independent	Rod Holding	3,015	3.0	−1.5
Socialist Alliance	Steve O'Brien	1,940	1.9	−0.2
Total formal votes		100,275	97.3	
Informal votes		2,768	2.7	
Turnout		103,043	83.7	
Two-candidate-preferred result
Labor	Nuatali Nelmes	50,776	60.0	
Newcastle Independents	John Church	33,819	40.0	
Labor hold		Swing	N/A	

=== Orange ===
2021 New South Wales mayoral elections: Orange
Party	Candidate	Votes	%	±%
Team Hamling	Jason Hamling	5,082	20.9	+20.9
For Our Future	Tony Mileto	4,698	19.3	+7.7
Independent	Kevin Duffy	3,940	16.2	+3.9
Greens	Neil Jones	3,775	15.5	+7.6
Independent	Amanda Spalding	3,369	13.8	+13.8
Independent Labor	Jeff Whitton	2,349	9.6	+2.4
Independent	Lesley Smith	192	0.8	+0.8
Total formal votes		24,355	95.9	+0.5
Informal votes		1,054	4.1	−0.5
Turnout		25,409	84.4	−1.1
Two-candidate-preferred result
Team Hamling	Jason Hamling	7,089	51.8	+51.8
For Our Future	Tony Mileto	6,602	48.2	+48.2
Team Hamling gain from Independent		Swing	N/A	

=== Port Macquarie-Hastings ===
2021 New South Wales mayoral elections: Port Macquarie-Hastings
Party	Candidate	Votes	%	±%
Team Pinson	Peta Pinson	29,928	54.9	+18.8
Sheppard Team	Rachel Sheppard	10,212	18.7	+18.7
Fighters	Lisa Intemann	6,576	12.1	−9.4
Independent	Steven Gates	4,663	8.6	+8.6
Hastings First	Nik Lipovac	3,120	5.7	+5.7
Total formal votes		54,499	95.9	+0.1
Informal votes		2,328	4.1	−0.1
Turnout		56,827	85.5	
Team Pinson hold		Swing	+18.83	

- Results compared with 2017 Port Macquarie-Hastings mayoral by-election

=== Port Stephens ===
2021 New South Wales mayoral elections: Port Stephens
Party	Candidate	Votes	%	±%
Independent	Ryan Palmer	24,187	50.6	+15.5
Labor	Leah Anderson	23,620	49.4	+36.4
Total formal votes		47,807	96.5	+2.0
Informal votes		1,721	3.5	−2.0
Turnout		49,528	86.8	+1.8
Independent hold		Swing	−12.5	

=== Richmond Valley ===
2021 New South Wales mayoral elections: Richmond Valley
Party	Candidate	Votes	%	±%
Independent	Robert Mustow	9,613	71.7	+14.2
Independent	Robert Hayes	3,792	28.3	+28.3
Total formal votes		13,405	95.3	
Informal votes		659	4.7	
Turnout		14,064	85.4	
Independent hold		Swing	+14.2	

=== Shellharbour ===
2021 New South Wales mayoral elections: Shellharbour
Party	Candidate	Votes	%	±%
Independent	Chris Homer	24,434	52.8	+52.8
Labor	Marianne Saliba	21,839	47.2	+47.2
Total formal votes		46,273	96.9	+96.9
Informal votes		1,486	3.1	+3.1
Turnout		47,759	85.8	+85.8
Independent win		Swing	N/A	

- This was the first time the position of mayor of Shellharbour was directly-elected instead of appointed by councillors
- Marianne Saliba (Labor) was the incumbent mayor, having been re-elected on 22 September 2021

=== Shoalhaven ===
2021 New South Wales mayoral elections: Shoalhaven
Party	Candidate	Votes	%	±%
Greens	Amanda Findley	22,951	34.2	+2.1
Independent	Paul Green	17,082	25.5	+25.5
Shoalhaven Independents	Greg Watson	9,191	13.7	−16.8
Shoalhaven Independents	Patricia White	6,606	9.9	+9.9
Shoalhaven Independents	Mark Kitchener	6,552	9.8	+9.8
Community First	Nina Digiglio	4,648	6.9	+6.9
Total formal votes		67,030	95.6	
Informal votes		3,100	4.4	
Turnout		70,130	84.5	
Two-candidate-preferred result
Greens	Amanda Findley	25,040	51.7	+0.3
Independent	Paul Green	23,426	48.3	+48.3
Greens hold		Swing	N/A	

=== Singleton ===
2021 New South Wales mayoral elections: Singleton
Party	Candidate	Votes	%	±%
Independent	Sue Moore	5,142	37.4	
Independent	Danny Thompson	3,811	27.7	
Labor	Tony Jarrett	3,085	22.4	
Independent	Belinda Charlton	1,717	12.5	
Total formal votes		13,755	95.9	
Informal votes		582	4.1	
Turnout		14,337	83.9	
Two-candidate-preferred result
Independent	Sue Moore	5,856	55.4	
Independent	Danny Thompson	4,721	44.6	
Independent hold		Swing		

=== Sydney ===
2021 New South Wales mayoral elections: Sydney
Party	Candidate	Votes	%	±%
Team Clover	Clover Moore	50,896	42.9	−14.9
Liberal	Shauna Jarrett	17,891	15.1	−3.9
Labor	Linda Scott	17,367	14.7	+4.2
Unite for Sydney	Yvonne Weldon	14,368	12.1	+12.1
Greens	Sylvie Ellsmore	9,812	8.3	+3.2
Small Business	Angela Vithoulkas	8,177	8.9	−0.8
Total formal votes		118,511	98.6	+0.2
Informal votes		1,675	1.4	−0.2
Turnout		120,186	68.7	+8.9
Two-candidate-preferred result
Team Clover	Clover Moore	60,926	67.9	
Labor	Linda Scott	28,786	32.1	
Team Clover hold		Swing		

=== The Hills ===
2021 New South Wales mayoral elections: The Hills
Party	Candidate	Votes	%	±%
Liberal	Peter Gangemi	56,266	53.4	−8.4
Labor	Ryan Tracey	25,204	23.9	+2.4
Greens	Vida Shahamat	12,586	11.9	+11.9
Independent	Ereboni (Alexia) Yazdani	7,653	7.3	+7.3
Independent	Jerzy (George) Rozyck	3,675	3.5	+3.5
Total formal votes		105,384	97.2	
Informal votes		3,015	2.8	
Turnout		108,399	89.3	
Liberal hold		Swing		

=== Uralla ===
2021 New South Wales mayoral elections: Uralla
Party	Candidate	Votes	%	±%
Independent	Robert Bell	2,823	74.7	
Independent	Isabel Strutt	493	13.0	
Independent	Natasha Ledger	465	12.3	
Total formal votes		3,781	96.8	
Informal votes		125	3.2	
Turnout		3,906	86.0	
Independent gain from Independent		Swing		

=== Willoughby ===
2021 New South Wales mayoral elections: Willoughby
Party	Candidate	Votes	%	±%
Community Matters	Tanya Taylor	14,903	39.3	+39.3
Independent Liberal	Angelo Rozos	13,303	35.1	+4.6
Independent Liberal	Craig Campbell	9,736	25.7	+25.7
Total formal votes		37,942	96.2	+1.2
Informal votes		1,511	3.8	−1.2
Turnout		39,453	85.0	+4.0
Two-candidate-preferred result
Community Matters	Tanya Taylor	17,207	54.0	+54.0
Independent Liberal	Angelo Rozos	14,676	46.0	+15.5
Community Matters gain from Independent Liberal		Swing	N/A	

=== Wollondilly ===
2021 New South Wales mayoral elections: Wollondilly
Party	Candidate	Votes	%	±%
Independent	Matt Gould	7,355	23.5	+23.5
Independent	Judy Hannan	6,260	20.0	+20.0
Independent	Ray Law	5,326	17.0	+17.0
Independent	Matthew Deeth	5,190	16.6	+16.6
Independent	Michael Banasik	3,621	11.5	+11.5
Independent	Robert Khan	3,603	11.5	+11.5
Total formal votes		31,355	95.0	+95.0
Informal votes		1,650	5.0	+5.0
Turnout		33,005	90.9	+90.9
Two-candidate-preferred result
Independent	Matt Gould	9,886	53.5	+53.5
Independent	Judy Hannan	8,601	46.5	+46.5
Independent win		Swing	N/A	

- This was the first time the position of mayor of Wollondilly was directly-elected instead of appointed by councillors
- Robert Khan (Independent) was the incumbent mayor, having been appointed on 16 September 2020

=== Wollongong ===
2021 New South Wales mayoral elections: Wollongong
Party	Candidate	Votes	%	±%
Wollongong Independents	Gordon Bradbery	38,741	30.4	−4.7
Labor	Tania Brown	36,430	28.6	+1.2
Liberal	John Dorahy	24,434	19.2	+2.6
Greens	Mithra Cox	16,539	13.0	+2.6
Sustainable Australia	Andrew Anthony	6,454	5.1	+3.6
Independent	Marie Glykis	4,642	3.6	+3.6
Total formal votes		127,240	96.6	
Informal votes		4,500	3.4	
Turnout		131,740	85.2	
Two-candidate-preferred result
Wollongong Independents	Gordon Bradbery	49,760	51.4	−2.8
Labor	Tania Brown	47,094	48.6	+2.8
Wollongong Independents hold		Swing	−2.8	
