= List of office holders of Port Macquarie-Hastings Council =

Mayor of Port Macquarie-Hastings
- Incumbent; Peta Pinson since 4 August 2017
- Style: Worship
- Appointer: Port Macquarie-Hastings Council
- Term length: 4 years
- Formation: 24 May 1887(Port Macquarie); 18 December 1906(Hastings); 16 December 1980
- Deputy: Cr. Lisa Intemann
- Website: www.pmhc.nsw.gov.au

This is a list of officeholders of Port Macquarie-Hastings Council and its predecessors, a local government area of New South Wales, Australia.

The Mayor of the Port Macquarie-Hastings Council since 4 August 2017 is Peta Pinson, an independent politician who joined the National Party in 2023.

== Mayors, Shire Presidents and General Managers ==
=== Municipality of Port Macquarie, 1887–1980 ===
| Mayor | Period | Notes |
|---|---|---|
| James McInherney | 24 May 1887 – 10 February 1890 | |
| Frederick Hayward | 10 February 1890 – 16 February 1893 | |
| James Butler | 16 February 1893 – 15 February 1894 | |
| Frederick Hayward | 15 February 1894 – 11 February 1898 | |
| William Andrew Spence | 11 February 1898 – 12 January 1899 | |
| Frederick Hayward | 16 January 1899 – 15 February 1901 | |
| Richard Woodlands | 15 February 1901 – 14 February 1902 | |
| William Andrew Spence | 14 February 1902 – 13 February 1903 | |
| Richard Arthur Ayres | 13 February 1903 – 15 February 1904 | |
| Frederick Hayward | 15 February 1904 – 19 January 1906 | |
| George Evan Bennett | 23 January 1906 – 3 April 1906 | |
| William Rosenbaum | 3 April 1906 – February 1910 | |
| Duncan Stewart | February 1910 – 8 February 1916 | |
| John Hooke Hill | 8 February 1916 – 20 December 1921 | |
| Albert Denham | 20 December 1921 – 11 June 1924 | |
| John Bransdon | 11 June 1924 – June 1925 | |
| Alban Charles Elliot | 25 June 1925 – 2 March 1936 | |
| Ernest Aubrey Mowle | 9 April 1936 – December 1941 | |
| Charles George Orr | December 1941 – December 1944 | |
| Charlie Allan Ryan | December 1944 – December 1947 | |
| Noel William Walter Joscelyne | December 1947 – December 1948 | |
| Charlie Allan Ryan | December 1948 – December 1949 | |
| Alfred Leslie Crisp | December 1949 – June 1952 | |
| Edmond Francis Brownlow | June 1952 – December 1954 | |
| Duncan Stewart Kennedy | December 1954 – December 1956 | |
| Alfred Leslie Crisp | December 1956 – December 1960 | |
| Duncan Stewart Kennedy | December 1960 – December 1961 | |
| Alfred Leslie Crisp | December 1961 – December 1963 | |
| Duncan Stewart Kennedy | December 1963 – December 1965 | |
| Alfred Leslie Crisp MBE | December 1965 – December 1966 | |
| Cyril Charles Adams | December 1966 – September 1970 | |
| Duncan Stewart Kennedy | September 1970 – September 1971 | |
| Cyril Charles Adams OAM MBE | September 1971 – September 1974 | |
| Norm Matesich | September 1974 – September 1976 | |
| Keith Stevenson | September 1976 – 4 September 1978 | |
| Jim Boardman | 4 September 1978 – 16 December 1980 | |

=== Hastings Shire, 1906–1980 ===
| Shire President | Period | Notes |
|---|---|---|
| Patrick Joseph O'Neill | 18 December 1906 – February 1908 | |
| Thomas Toms | February 1908 – 21 August 1908 | |
| James Gamack | 8 September 1908 – February 1909 | |
| Robert Longworth | February 1909 – February 1910 | |
| John Hooke Hill | February 1910 – February 1911 | |
| James Gamack | February 1911 – February 1912 | |
| Jacob Decan Healey | February 1912 – February 1914 | |
| Albert Edward Rose | February 1914 – February 1915 | |
| John Downes Jnr. | February 1915 – February 1916 | |
| Albert Edward Rose | February 1916 – February 1917 | |
| John Downes Jnr. | February 1917 – February 1918 | |
| William Campbell Lindsay | February 1918 – February 1919 | |
| John Downes Jnr. | February 1919 – February 1920 | |
| Robert Longworth | February 1920 – December 1920 | |
| Henry Warlters Snr. | December 1920 – December 1921 | |
| John James Warrall | December 1921 – December 1925 | |
| Edwin Suters | December 1925 – December 1926 | |
| James Gamack | December 1926 – December 1927 | |
| Thomas Miles Breckenridge | December 1927 – December 1928 | |
| Patrick Henry Secombe | December 1928 – December 1929 | |
| John Downes Jnr. | December 1929 – December 1930 | |
| Albert Edward Rose | December 1930 – December 1931 | |
| William Hastings Blythe | December 1931 – December 1932 | |
| John Downes Jnr. | December 1932 – December 1933 | |
| John James Warrall | December 1933 – December 1934 | |
| Radford Gamack | December 1934 – December 1935 | |
| Robert Barrie Walsh | December 1935 – December 1936 | |
| Albert Edward Rose | December 1936 – December 1937 | |
| John Downes Jnr. | December 1937 – December 1938 | |
| Harold Austin Waller Rose | December 1938 – December 1939 | |
| John James Warrall | December 1939 – December 1940 | |
| Harrie Stewart Bransdon | December 1940 – December 1941 | |
| George Hollis | December 1941 – December 1942 | |
| Charles Perrott | December 1942 – December 1943 | |
| Radford Gamack | December 1943 – December 1944 | |
| Harold Austin Waller Rose | December 1944 – December 1947 | |
| Harrie Stewart Bransdon | December 1947 – December 1955 | |
| George Hollis | December 1955 – December 1956 | |
| Harrie Stewart Bransdon | December 1956 – December 1960 | |
| Harry Warlters | December 1960 – December 1964 | |
| Joseph Robert Andrews | December 1964 – September 1970 | |
| John Abi-Saab | September 1970 – September 1976 | |
| John Joseph Steinmetz | September 1976 – September 1977 | |
| John Abi-Saab | September 1977 – September 1978 | |
| William Poole | September 1978 – 16 December 1980 | |

=== Hastings/Port Macquarie-Hastings, 1980–date ===
Hastings Municipal Council/Hastings Council
| Mayor | Party | Period | Notes |
|---|---|---|---|
| Norm Matesich OAM | Independent | 16 December 1980 – September 1983 | |
| John Sterndale | Independent | September 1983 – September 1985 | |
| Bob Woodlands | Independent | September 1985 – September 1991 | |
| John Barrett | Independent | September 1991 – September 1992 | |
| Leonard Cooper | Independent | September 1992 – September 1995 | |
| Frank Harrison | Independent | September 1995 – September 1998 | |
| Wayne Richards | Independent | September 1998 – September 2003 | |
| Rob Drew | Independent | September 2003 – 13 July 2005 | |
Port Macquarie-Hastings Council
| Rob Drew | Independent | 13 July 2005 – 27 February 2008 | |
| Dick Persson AM (Administrator) | Independent | 27 February 2008 – 31 January 2009 | |
| Garry Payne (Administrator) | Independent | 31 January 2009 – 29 April 2011 | |
| Neil Porter (Administrator) | Independent | 29 April 2011 – 8 September 2012 | |
| Peter Besseling | Independent | 8 September 2012 – 8 May 2017 | |
| Lisa Intemann (acting) | Independent | 8 May 2017 – 4 August 2017 | |
| Peta Pinson | Independent | 4 August 2017 – date | |
| Peta Pinson | National | 4 August 2017 – date | |

=== General Managers ===
| General Manager | Period | Notes |
|---|---|---|
| Bernard Smith | 2000 – 31 March 2008 | |
| David Mead (acting) | 1 April 2008 – 25 August 2008 | |
| Andrew Roach | 25 August 2008 – 16 February 2011 | |
| Jeffery Sharp (acting) | 16 February 2011 – 18 July 2011 | |
| Tony Hayward | 18 July 2011 – 10 February 2014 | |
| Craig Swift-McNair | 26 June 2014 – date | |

== Electoral results ==
=== 2024 ===
2024 New South Wales mayoral elections: Port Macquarie-Hastings
| Party | Candidate | Votes | % | ±% |
|---|---|---|---|---|
| Team Roberts | Adam Roberts | 21,080 | 37.8 | −17.1 (Note: Compared with Peta Pinson (Team Pinson) at the 2021 election.) |
| Team Lipovac | Nik Lipovac | 12,972 | 23.3 | +17.6 |
| Greens | Lauren Edwards | 11,898 | 21.4 | +21.4 |
| Libertarian | Mark Hornshaw | 9,758 | 17.5 | +17.5 |
| Total formal votes | | 55,708 | 93.5 | |
| Informal votes | | 3,879 | 6.5 | |
| Turnout | | 59,587 | 85.11 | |
Two-candidate-preferred result
| Team Roberts | Adam Roberts | 25,092 | 60.1 | |
| Team Lipovac | Nik Lipovac | 16,652 | 39.9 | |
| Team Roberts gain from Team Pinson | | Swing | N/A | |

=== 2021 ===
2021 New South Wales mayoral elections: Port Macquarie-Hastings
| Party | Candidate | Votes | % | ±% |
|---|---|---|---|---|
| Team Pinson | Peta Pinson | 29,928 | 54.9 | +18.8 |
| Sheppard Team | Rachel Sheppard | 10,212 | 18.7 | +18.7 |
| Fighters | Lisa Intemann | 6,576 | 12.1 | −9.4 |
| Independent | Steven Gates | 4,663 | 8.6 | +8.6 |
| Hastings First | Nik Lipovac | 3,120 | 5.7 | +5.7 |
| Total formal votes | | 54,499 | 95.9 | +0.1 |
| Informal votes | | 2,328 | 4.1 | −0.1 |
| Turnout | | 56,827 | 85.5 | |
| Team Pinson hold | | Swing | +18.83 | |

- Results compared with 2017 Port Macquarie-Hastings mayoral by-election

=== 2017 by-election ===
2017 Port Macquarie-Hastings mayoral by-election
| Party | Candidate | Votes | % | ±% |
|---|---|---|---|---|
| Independent | Peta Pinson | 17,590 | 36.07 | |
| Independent | Robert Turner | 14,313 | 29.35 | |
| Independent | Lisa Intemann | 10,491 | 21.51 | |
| Independent | Sharon Griffiths | 3,463 | 7.10 | |
| Greens | Lauren Edwards | 2,914 | 5.97 | |
| Total formal votes | | 48,771 | 95.83 | |
| Informal votes | | 2,124 | 4.17 | |
| Turnout | | 50,895 | | |
Two-candidate-preferred result
| Independent | Peta Pinson | 20,823 | 51.07 | |
| Independent | Robert Turner | 19,950 | 48.93 | |
| Independent hold | | Swing | | |
