= List of mayors of Hunter's Hill =

Mayor of Hunter's Hill Council
- Incumbent; Zac Miles since 4 December 2021
- Style: His Worship
- Appointer: Hunter's Hill Council
- Term length: One year (1861–2004) Four years (2004–date)
- Formation: 1861
- First holder: Jules Joubert
- Deputy: Elizabeth Krassoi
- Website: https://www.huntershill.nsw.gov.au/

This is a list of mayors of the Council of the Municipality of Hunter's Hill, a local government area in northern Sydney, New South Wales, Australia. The Municipality was first incorporated on 12 March 1861. Since 2004, the Mayor has been directly elected for a four-year term by the voters in the Municipality. The official title of mayors while holding office is His/Her Worship the Mayor of the Municipality of Hunter's Hill. The current mayor is Councillor Zac Miles, a Liberal Party politician, elected on 4 December 2021.

== List of incumbents ==
The following individuals have served as Mayor of the Council of the Municipality of Hunter's Hill:

#	Chairman	Party	Term start	Term end	Time in office	Notes
1	Jules Joubert	No party	20 July 1861	February 1863	1 year, 196 days	
2	Gabriel de Milhau	No party	February 1863	February 1864	1 year, 0 days	
3	William B. Campbell	No party	February 1864	February 1865	1 year, 0 days	
4	Francis Campbell	No party	February 1865	February 1866	1 year, 0 days	
–	William B. Campbell	No party	February 1866	February 1867	1 year, 0 days	
#	Mayor	Party	Term start	Term end	Time in office	Notes
5	Didier Numa Joubert	No party	February 1867	21 February 1870	3 years, 20 days	
6	Charles Edward Jeanneret	No party	21 February 1870	16 February 1872	1 year, 360 days	
7	Robert Vining Gale	No party	16 February 1872	10 February 1874	1 year, 359 days	
8	Henry Prior Palser	No party	10 February 1874	15 February 1875	1 year, 5 days	
9	Ambrose Fitzpatrick	No party	15 February 1875	14 February 1876	364 days	
–	Robert Vining Gale	No party	14 February 1876	5 May 1876	81 days	
–	Ambrose Fitzpatrick	No party	13 May 1876	14 February 1877	277 days	
–	Charles Edward Jeanneret	No party	14 February 1877	11 February 1879	1 year, 362 days	
10	Angelo Tornaghi	No party	11 February 1879	14 February 1880	1 year, 3 days	
11	Jabez King Heydon	No party	14 February 1880	February 1882	1 year, 352 days	
–	Angelo Tornaghi	No party	February 1882	12 February 1884	2 years, 11 days	
12	James Nutman	No party	12 February 1884	4 September 1884	205 days	
13	William Joseph Doyle	No party	4 September 1884	11 February 1885	160 days	
14	Joseph Booth	No party	11 February 1885	12 February 1886	1 year, 1 day	
15	James Brown	No party	12 February 1886	9 February 1887	362 days	
16	Robert Smith	Independent	9 February 1887	February 1888	357 days	
17	Numa Augustus Joubert	Independent	February 1888	16 February 1889	1 year, 15 days	
18	Alfred Weeks	Independent	16 February 1889	12 February 1890	361 days	
–	Charles Edward Jeanneret	Independent	12 February 1890	12 February 1891	1 year, 0 days	
19	Frank McNeil	Independent	12 February 1891	10 February 1892	363 days	
20	Bernard McBride	Independent	10 February 1892	14 February 1894	2 years, 4 days	
21	Thomas Turner	Independent	14 February 1894	12 February 1896	1 year, 363 days	
22	Adelbert Theophilus Schleicher	Independent	12 February 1896	5 February 1898	1 year, 358 days	
23	James Richard Thomson	Independent	5 February 1898	12 February 1900	2 years, 7 days	
24	James Macartney Rooke	Independent	12 February 1900	16 February 1903	3 years, 4 days	
25	Herbert John Aspinall	Independent	16 February 1903	July 1917	1 year, 363 days	
26	Edward Marsden Betts	Independent	13 February 1905	February 1913	7 years, 354 days	
27	William Archibald Windeyer	Independent	February 1913	February 1914	1 year, 0 days	
–	Adelbert Theophilus Schleicher	Independent	February 1914	7 February 1916	2 years, 6 days	
–	Herbert John Aspinall	Independent	7 February 1916	July 1917	1 year, 144 days	
–	William Archibald Windeyer MBE	Independent	July 1917	21 March 1924	6 years, 264 days	
28	Ralph Unwin	Independent	21 March 1924	December 1925	1 year, 255 days	
29	Louis Alfred Meyers	Independent	December 1925	December 1927	2 years, 0 days	
30	Ernest Clarke	Independent	December 1927	11 January 1932	4 years, 41 days	
31	George William Woodbridge	Independent	11 January 1932	December 1933	1 year, 324 days	
32	Clarence Farthing	Independent	December 1933	15 December 1934	1 year, 14 days	
33	Robert Sterling Murray-Prior	Independent	15 December 1934	18 December 1935	1 year, 3 days	
–	Louis Alfred Meyers	Independent	18 December 1935	December 1939	3 years, 348 days	
34	Bert Cowell	Independent	December 1939	December 1940	1 year, 0 days	
35	Henry Ryves	Independent	December 1940	December 1941	1 year, 0 days	
36	Clement Wesley Weil	Independent	December 1941	December 1951	10 years, 0 days	
37	Thomas William Belford Haynes	Independent	December 1951	December 1952	1 year, 0 days	
38	John Reeves	Independent	December 1952	15 December 1953	1 year, 0 days	
–	Clement Wesley Weil	Independent	15 December 1953	14 December 1954	364 days	
39	Alex Harding	Independent	14 December 1954	December 1957	3 years, 0 days	
40	Ken Bell	Independent	December 1957	December 1961	4 years, 0 days	
41	Harry Jessup	Independent	December 1961	December 1963	2 years, 0 days	
42	William Thom	Independent	December 1963	December 1965	2 years, 0 days	
43	John Merrington	Independent	December 1965	December 1967	2 years, 0 days	
–	Ken Bell	Independent	December 1967	December 1968	1 year, 0 days	
44	Donald Farrant	Independent	December 1968	September 1974	5 years, 274 days	
45	Leon J. Crawley	Independent	September 1974	September 1976	2 years, 0 days	
46	David Landa OAM	Independent	September 1976	September 1979	3 years, 0 days	
47	John Lyndon Jones	Independent	September 1979	September 1980	1 year, 0 days	
48	Sheila Burns Swain	Independent	September 1980	September 1982	2 years, 0 days	
49	Kerry Wherry	Independent	September 1982	September 1983	1 year, 0 days	
50	John C. McCarthy	Independent	September 1983	September 1985	2 years, 0 days	
51	Bruce Edelman	Independent	September 1985	September 1987	2 years, 0 days	
–	Sheila Burns Swain AM	Independent	September 1987	September 1989	2 years, 0 days	
52	Ross Ernest Williams	Independent	September 1989	September 1993	4 years, 0 days	
53	Ross Sheerin	Independent	September 1993	September 1995	2 years, 0 days	
54	Jane Margaret Waddell	Independent	September 1995	September 1996	1 year, 0 days	
55	William Gordon Phipson PSM	Independent	September 1996	September 1998	2 years, 0 days	
56	Arthur Francis Boyd	Independent	September 1998	September 1999	1 year, 0 days	
57	Susan Ruth Hoopman	Independent	September 1999	10 September 2001	2 years, 0 days	
58	Bruce Richard Lucas	Independent	10 September 2001	27 March 2004	2 years, 199 days	
–	Susan Ruth Hoopman OAM	Independent	27 March 2004	8 September 2012	8 years, 165 days	
59	Richard Quinn	Independent	8 September 2012	9 September 2017	5 years, 1 day	
60	Mark Bennett	Independent	9 September 2017	9 September 2020	3 years, 0 days	
–	Ross Ernest Williams	Independent	9 September 2020	4 December 2021	1 year, 86 days	
61	Zac Miles	Liberal	4 December 2021	present	4 years, 353 days	

== Electoral results ==
=== 2024 ===
2024 New South Wales mayoral elections: Hunter's Hill
Party	Candidate	Votes	%	±%
Liberal	Zac Miles	5,250	62.19	+22.33
Team Ross	Ross Williams	3,192	37.81	+10.13
Total formal votes		8,442	97.54	+0.06
Informal votes		213	2.46	–0.06
Turnout		8,655	85.42	–1.04
Liberal hold		Swing		

=== 2021 ===
2021 New South Wales mayoral elections: Hunter's Hill
Party	Candidate	Votes	%	±%
Liberal	Zac Miles	3,331	39.9	−0.3
Team Ross	Ross Williams	2,313	27.7	−0.7
Independent	Richard Quinn	2,015	24.1	+24.1
Independent	David Guazzarotto	697	8.3	+8.3
Total formal votes		8,356	97.5	+1.0
Informal votes		216	2.5	−1.0
Turnout		8,572	86.3	+2.9
Two-candidate-preferred result
Liberal	Zac Miles	3,821	52.7	+7.1
Team Ross	Ross Williams	3,437	47.3	−7.1
Liberal gain from Team Ross		Swing	+7.1	

=== 2017 ===
2017 New South Wales mayoral elections: Hunter's Hill
Party	Candidate	Votes	%	±%
Liberal	Zac Miles	3,228	40.2	
Independent	Mark Bennett	2,527	31.5	
Independent	Ross Williams	2,276	28.3	
Total formal votes		8,031	96.5	
Informal votes			3.5	
Turnout			83.4	
Two-candidate-preferred result
Independent	Mark Bennett	3,995	54.4	
Liberal	Zac Miles	3,350	45.6	
Independent hold		Swing		
