= List of mayors of Hornsby =

This is a list of presidents and mayors of Hornsby Shire, a local government area in the Northern Suburbs of Sydney, New South Wales, Australia. The Shire stretches from the suburbs of Beecroft and North Epping in the south to the Hawkesbury River town of Wisemans Ferry in the north. The first council was elected on 24 November 1906 after the incorporation of the shire.

== Presidents and mayors ==
President	Term
John Hunt	Dec 1906 – Oct 1907
William Nixon	Oct 1907 – Dec 1909
Lord Livingstone Ramsay	Dec 1909 – Dec 1913
John Schwebel	Dec 1913 – Dec 1915
Paul James	Dec 1915 – Dec 1920
Frank Chapman	Dec 1920 – Dec 1921
Paul James	Dec 1921 – Dec 1923
Richard Allen	Dec 1923 – Dec 1924
Paul James	Dec 1924 – Dec 1927
Frank Chapman	Dec 1927 – Dec 1928
Paul James	Dec 1928 – Dec 1931
Thomas Rofe	Dec 1931 – Dec 1932
Sydney Storey	Dec 1932 – Dec 1934
Percy Law	Dec 1934 – Dec 1935
Charles Somerville	Dec 1935 – Dec 1942
George Vaughan	Dec 1942 – Dec 1946
Sydney Storey	Dec 1946 – Dec 1950
Charles Somerville	Dec 1950 – Dec 1953
Harold Headen	Dec 1953 – Dec 1955
Lin Green	Dec 1955 – Dec 1956
Harold Headen	Dec 1956 – Dec 1960
Max Ruddock	Dec 1960 – Dec 1961
Donald Tulloch	Dec 1961 – Dec 1967
Gordon Curby	Dec 1967 – Sept 1972
Donald Evans	Sept 1972 – Sept 1977
Gordon Curby	Sept 1977 – Sept 1978
Donald Evans	Sept 1978 – Sept 1983
Ronald Payne	Sept 1983 – Sept 1986
Gordon Curby	Sept 1986 – Sept 1987
Lindsey Brown	Sept 1987 – Sept 1988
Ronald Payne	Sept 1988 – Sept 1989
Brian Carey	Sept 1989 – Sept 1990
Nan Horne	Sept 1990 – Sept 1992
Mayor	Term
Steven Pringle	Sept 1992 – Sept 1993
Chris Meany	Sept 1993 – Sept 1994
Mick Gallagher	Sept 1994 – Sept 1995
Steven Pringle	Sept 1995 – Sept 1996
John Muirhead	Sept 1996 – Sept 1998
Steven Pringle	Sept 1998 – Sept 1999
Robert Browne	Sept 1999 – Sept 2000
John Muirhead	Sept 2000 – Sept 2001
Steven Pringle	Sept 2001 – Sept 2002
John Muirhead ^	Sept 2002 – Mar 2004
Nick Berman ^^	Mar 2004 – Sept 2012
Steve Russell	Sept 2012 – Sept 2017
Philip Ruddock	Sept 2017 – Sept 2024
Warren Waddell	Sept 2024 – Present

^ Term extended prior to direct election
^^ First directly elected mayor

== Electoral results ==
=== 2024 ===
2024 New South Wales mayoral elections: Hornsby
Party	Candidate	Votes	%	±%
Liberal	Warren Waddell	36,249	41.66	–15.62
Labor	Janelle McIntosh	18,699	19.42	
Independent	Nathan Tilbury	15,175	17.44	
Independent	Roger Woodward	2,421	2.78	
Greens	Tania Salitra	16,260	18.69	−24.03
Total formal votes		87,004	96.84	–0.73
Informal votes		2,838	3.16	+0.73
Turnout		89,842	87.94	–0.51
Two-party-preferred result
Liberal	Warren Waddell	40,007	61.68	+4.40
Labor	Janelle McIntosh	24,856	38.32	N/A
Liberal hold		Swing		

=== 2021 ===
2021 New South Wales mayoral elections: Hornsby
Party	Candidate	Votes	%	±%
Liberal	Philip Ruddock	49,065	57.3	+9.5
Greens	Emma Heyde	36,591	42.7	+24.3
Total formal votes		85,656	97.6	+0.6
Informal votes		2,136	2.4	−0.6
Turnout		87,792	88.2	+2.6
Liberal hold		Swing	N/A	

=== 2017 ===
2017 New South Wales mayoral elections: Hornsby
Party	Candidate	Votes	%	±%
Liberal	Philip Ruddock	39,325	47.8	+4.8
Greens	Emma Heyde	15,140	18.4	+18.4
Labor	Janelle McIntosh	12,385	15.0	+15.0
Independent	Christine Berman	8,357	10.2	−29.9
Independent	Mick Gallagher	7,126	8.7	−4.6
Total formal votes		82,333	97.0	
Informal votes			3.0	
Turnout			85.6	
Liberal	Philip Ruddock	40,143	50.9	
Greens	Emma Heyde	15,839	20.1	+20.1
Labor	Janelle McIntosh	13,022	16.5	+16.5
Independent	Christine Berman	9,824	12.5	
Liberal hold		Swing		
