= 2017 New South Wales mayoral elections =

- 9 September 2017

13 of the 33 directly-elected mayors in New South Wales

	First party	Second party
	IND
Leader	N/A	N/A
Party	Independents and local groups	Labor
Last election	7 mayors (Note: This does not include mayoralties that were won in 2016 but not up for re-election until 2021.)	3 mayors
Seats before	5	4
Seats won	5 mayors	4 mayors
	Third party	Fourth party
Leader	N/A	No leader
Party	Liberal	Greens
Last election	1 mayor	0 mayors
Seats before	2	0
Seats won	2 mayors	0

The 2017 New South Wales mayoral elections were held on 9 September 2017 to elect mayors or lord mayors to 13 of the 46 local government areas (LGAs) up for election in New South Wales. The elections were held as part of the statewide local elections.

While most mayors in New South Wales are elected by councillors at meetings, several choose to have directly elected (or popularly elected) mayors.

This was the last time the position of mayor of North Sydney was directly elected, as a referendum held on the same day as the local elections saw 52.4% of residents vote in favour of replacing the election with a vote from councillors. The change came into effect in 2021.

== Background ==
=== 2014 Willoughby by-election ===
On 20 January 2014, Willoughby mayor Pat Reilly (Independent) died in hospital after a short sickness.

Although she finished in third place on first preferences, Independent Liberal candidate Gail Giles-Gidney won the by-election on 12 April with 50.8% of the vote after preference distribution.

=== 2014 Newcastle by-election ===
On 17 August 2014, Newcastle lord mayor Jeff McCloy (Independent) resigned following an Independent Commission Against Corruption inquiry into donations he made to Liberal Party candidates during his tenure as a property developer.

The subsequent by-election on 15 November was won by Labor candidate Nuatali Nelmes.

== Candidates ==
Incumbents at the time of the elections are highlighted in bold text.

LGA	Held by	Labor	Liberal	Greens	Independent	Others
Burwood	Labor	**John Faker**	Joseph Del Duca			Lesley Furneaux-Cook (ICV)
Canada Bay	Labor	**Angelo Tsirekas**	Helen McCaffrey	Charles Jago	Daniela Ramondino	
Hornsby	Liberal	Janelle McIntosh	Philip Ruddock	Emma Heyde	Christine Berman; Mick Gallagher	
Hunter's Hill	Independent		Zac Miles		Mark Bennett; Ross Williams	
Maitland	Labor	Loretta Baker	Bob Geoghegan	John Brown	Brian Burke; Ken Wethered	Philip Penfold (PI)
Mosman	Serving Mosman				Simon Menzies; Libby Moline	Roy Bendall (RFM); Carolyn Corrigan (SM)
Newcastle	Labor	**Nuatali Nelmes**	David Compton (disendorsed)	Therese Doyle	Ron Brown; Kath Elliott; Rod Holding	Steve O'Brien (SA)
North Sydney	Independent				**Zoë Baker**; Jilly Gibson; Jessica Keen	Michael Kong (LDP)
Orange	Independent			Stephen Nugent	Kevin Duffy; Ron Gander; Chris Gryllis; **Reg Kidd**; Tony Mileto; Scott Munro; Paula Townsend	Russell Turner (Ind. Nat); Jeff Whitton (Ind. ALP)
Port Stephens	Independent	Des Maslen			Geoff Dingle; Sally Dover; Peter Kafer; Ryan Palmer; Steve Tucker	
The Hills	Liberal	Tony Hay	Michelle Byrne		Jeff Lowe	Ray Brown (BAP)
Willoughby	Independent Liberal				Angelo Rozos	**Gail Giles-Gidney** (Ind. Lib)
Wollongong	Wollongong Independent	David Brown	John Dorahy	Mithra Cox	Andrew Anthony; Vicki Curran; Warwick Erwin; John Mullan; Greg Petty	**Gordon Bradbery** (WI)

=== Retiring mayors ===
- Peter Blackmore (Independent) − Maitland, announced 17 May 2017
- Steve Russell (Liberal) − Hornsby, announced July 2017
- Bruce McKenzie (Independent) − Port Stephens, announced 9 August 2017
- John Davis (Independent) − Orange, announced 10 August 2017; not directly elected
- Yvonne Keane (Liberal) − The Hills, announced 2017; not directly elected
- Peter Abelson (Serving Mosman) − Mosman, announced 2017

== Results ==
=== Burwood ===
2017 New South Wales mayoral elections: Burwood
Party	Candidate	Votes	%	±%
Labor	John Faker	8,403	52.6	+8.3
Liberal	Joseph Del Duca	3,899	24.4	−3.3
Community Voice	Lesley Furneaux-Cook	3,663	22.9	+1.7
Total formal votes		15,965	97.0	
Informal votes			3.0	
Turnout			79.6	
Labor hold		Swing	+8.3	

=== Canada Bay ===
2017 New South Wales mayoral elections: Canada Bay
Party	Candidate	Votes	%	±%
Labor	Angelo Tsirekas	17,589	39.7	−9.7
Liberal	Helen McCaffrey	16,513	37.3	−4.1
Independent	Daniela Ramondino	6,101	13.8	+13.8
Greens	Charles Jago	4,117	9.3	+0.0
Total formal votes		44,320	96.1	
Informal votes			3.9	
Turnout			80.3	
Two-candidate-preferred result
Labor	Angelo Tsirekas	22,083	54.9	
Liberal	Helen McCaffrey	18,177	45.1	
Labor hold		Swing		

=== Hornsby ===
2017 New South Wales mayoral elections: Hornsby
Party	Candidate	Votes	%	±%
Liberal	Philip Ruddock	39,325	47.8	+4.8
Greens	Emma Heyde	15,140	18.4	+18.4
Labor	Janelle McIntosh	12,385	15.0	+15.0
Independent	Christine Berman	8,357	10.2	−29.9
Independent	Mick Gallagher	7,126	8.7	−4.6
Total formal votes		82,333	97.0	
Informal votes			3.0	
Turnout			85.6	
After distribution of preferences
Liberal	Philip Ruddock	40,143	50.9	
Greens	Emma Heyde	15,839	20.1	+20.1
Labor	Janelle McIntosh	13,022	16.5	+16.5
Independent	Christine Berman	9,824	12.5	
Liberal hold		Swing		

=== Hunter's Hill ===
2017 New South Wales mayoral elections: Hunter's Hill
Party	Candidate	Votes	%	±%
Liberal	Zac Miles	3,228	40.2	
Independent	Mark Bennett	2,527	31.5	
Independent	Ross Williams	2,276	28.3	
Total formal votes		8,031	96.5	
Informal votes			3.5	
Turnout			83.4	
Two-candidate-preferred result
Independent	Mark Bennett	3,995	54.4	
Liberal	Zac Miles	3,350	45.6	
Independent hold		Swing		

=== Maitland ===
2017 New South Wales mayoral elections: Maitland
Party	Candidate	Votes	%	±%
Country Labor	Loretta Baker	14,674	31.4	+12.2
Penfold Independents	Philip Penfold	13,160	28.2	+7.1
Liberal	Bob Geoghegan	8,062	17.3	+17.3
Greens	John Brown	2,212	4.7	−1.2
Independent	Ken Wethered	4,546	9.7	+9.7
Independent	Brian Burke	4,082	8.7	+8.7
Total formal votes		46,736	95.9	
Informal votes			4.1	
Turnout			84.2	
Two-candidate-preferred result
Country Labor	Loretta Baker	19,771	54.8	
Penfold Independents	Philip Penfold	16,277	45.2	
Country Labor gain from Independent		Swing	N/A	

=== Mosman ===
2017 New South Wales mayoral elections: Mosman
Party	Candidate	Votes	%	±%
Serving Mosman	Carolyn Corrigan	5,928	39.9	+11.5
Residents For Mosman	Roy Bendall	4,192	27.8	+6.4
Independent	Simon Menzies	2,971	19.7	+6.3
Independent	Libby Moline	1,975	13.1	+3.4
Total formal votes		15,066	95.3	
Informal votes			4.7	
Turnout			75.7	
Two-candidate-preferred result
Serving Mosman	Carolyn Corrigan	7,140	56.9	
Residents For Mosman	Roy Bendall	5,415	43.1	
Serving Mosman hold		Swing		

=== Newcastle ===
2017 New South Wales mayoral elections: Newcastle
Party	Candidate	Votes	%	±%
Labor	Nuatali Nelmes	38,698	42.6	+0.3
Independent	Kath Elliott	18,925	20.8	+20.8
Greens	Therese Doyle	12,123	13.3	−0.7
Liberal	David Compton (disendorsed)	11,770	12.9	+12.9
Independent	Rod Holding	4,120	4.5	+2.7
Independent	Ron Brown	3,354	3.7	+3.7
Socialist Alliance	Steve O'Brien	1,909	2.1	+2.1
Total formal votes		90,899	95.2	
Informal votes			4.8	
Turnout			81.1	
Three-candidate-preferred result
Labor	Nuatali Nelmes	40,027	51.8	+1.0
Independent	Kath Elliott	23,374	30.3	+30.3
Greens	Therese Doyle	13,801	17.9	+0.6
Labor hold		Swing	+1.0	

- Changes compared with 2014 Newcastle lord mayoral by-election

=== North Sydney ===
2017 New South Wales mayoral elections: North Sydney
Party	Candidate	Votes	%	±%
Independent	Jilly Gibson	13,791	42.0	+1.5
Independent	Zoë Baker	9,856	30.0	−3.1
Independent	Jessica Keen	6,510	19.8	+19.8
Liberal Democrats	Michael Kong	2,655	8.1	+8.1
Total formal votes		32,812	95.4	
Informal votes			4.6	
Turnout			72.6	
Two-candidate-preferred result
Independent	Jilly Gibson	14,828	56.4	−0.4
Independent	Zoë Baker	11,441	43.6	+0.4
Independent hold		Swing	−0.4	

=== Orange ===
2017 New South Wales mayoral elections: Orange
Party	Candidate	Votes	%	±%
Independent	Reg Kidd	5,196	21.9	+21.9
Independent National	Russell Turner	4,522	19.0	+19.0
Independent	Kevin Duffy	2,926	12.3	+12.3
Independent	Tony Mileto	2,017	8.5	+8.5
Greens	Stephen Nugent	1,885	7.9	+7.9
Independent	Scott Munro	1,842	7.8	+7.8
Independent Labor	Jeff Whitton	1,717	7.2	+7.2
Independent	Paula Townsend	1,621	6.8	+6.8
Independent	Chris Gryllis	1,462	6.2	+6.2
Independent	Ron Gander	576	2.4	+2.4
Total formal votes		23,764	95.4	N/A
Informal votes			4.6	N/A
Turnout			85.5	N/A
Two-candidate-preferred result
Independent	Reg Kidd	7,159	54.1	+54.1
Independent National	Russell Turner	6,084	45.9	+45.9
Independent win		Swing	N/A	

- This was the first time the position of mayor of Orange was directly elected
- John Davis (Independent) was the incumbent mayor, having been first elected in 2009

=== Port Stephens ===
2017 New South Wales mayoral elections: Port Stephens
Party	Candidate	Votes	%	±%
Independent	Ryan Palmer	15,079	35.1	+35.1
Independent	Sally Dover	7,668	17.8	−11.3
Independent	Geoff Dingle	6,511	15.1	−19.5
Independent	Steve Tucker	6,072	14.1	+14.1
Country Labor	Des Maslen	5,599	13.0	+13.0
Independent	Peter Kafer	2,090	4.9	+4.9
Total formal votes		43,019	94.5	
Informal votes			5.5	
Turnout			85.0	
Two-candidate-preferred result
Independent	Ryan Palmer	18,897	63.1	+63.1
Independent	Sally Dover	11,054	36.9	+36.9
Independent gain from Independent		Swing	N/A	

=== The Hills ===
2017 New South Wales mayoral elections: The Hills
Party	Candidate	Votes	%	±%
Liberal	Michelle Byrne	53,323	61.8	+61.8
Labor	Tony Hay	18,549	21.5	+21.5
Independent	Jeff Lowe	9,689	11.2	+11.2
Building Australia	Ray Brown	4,701	5.4	+5.4
Total formal votes		86,262	95.7	N/A
Informal votes			4.3	N/A
Turnout			81.7	N/A
Liberal win		Swing	N/A	

- This was the first time the position of mayor of The Hills was directly elected
- Yvonne Keane (Liberal) was the incumbent mayor, having been elected in 2016

=== Willoughby ===
2017 New South Wales mayoral elections: Willoughby
Party	Candidate	Votes	%	±%
Independent Liberal	Gail Giles-Gidney	24,713	69.5	+18.7
Independent Liberal	Angelo Rozos	10,869	30.5	+30.5
Total formal votes		35,582	95.0	−1.3
Informal votes			5.0	+1.3
Turnout			81.0	+12.3
Independent Liberal hold		Swing	+18.7	

- Changes compared with 2014 Willoughby mayoral by-election

=== Wollongong ===
2017 New South Wales mayoral elections: Wollongong
Party	Candidate	Votes	%	±%
Wollongong Independents	Gordon Bradbery	41,581	35.2	+0.2
Labor	David Brown	32,386	27.4	+8.1
Liberal	John Dorahy	19,672	16.6	−6.4
Greens	Mithra Cox	12,291	10.4	+4.7
Independent	John Mullan	4,037	3.4	+3.4
Independent	Vicki Curran	3,280	2.8	+0.4
Independent	Andrew Anthony	1,708	1.4	−0.2
Independent	Greg Petty	1,660	1.4	−0.7
Independent	Warwick Erwin	1,590	1.3	+1.3
Total formal votes		118,205	95.2	
Informal votes			4.8	
Turnout			82.4	
Two-candidate-preferred result
Wollongong Independents	Gordon Bradbery	47,465	54.2	
Labor	David Brown	40,067	45.8	
Wollongong Independents hold		Swing		
