= Results of the 2024 New South Wales local elections in Hunter =

2024 New South Wales local elections (Hunter)
- 14 September 2024

This is a list of results for the 2024 New South Wales local elections in the Hunter Region.

Hunter, also known as Greater Newcastle, covers nine local government areas (LGAs), including the City of Newcastle and the City of Lake Macquarie.

== Cessnock ==
2024 Cessnock City Council election
- 14 September 2024

All 13 seats on Cessnock City Council 7 seats needed for a majority
- Registered: 49,457
- Mayor
- Turnout: 85.44%
	First party	Second party
	CI
Candidate	Daniel Watton	Jay Suvaal
Party	Cessnock Inds	Labor
Primary vote	19,606	16,806
Percentage	49.35%	42.30%
Swing	▲22.10	▼42.30
TCP	53.71%	46.29%
TCP swing	▲13.23	▼13.23
Mayor before election
Jay Suvaal
Labor
Elected Mayor
Daniel Watton
Cessnock Inds
- Councillors
Party	Leader	Vote %	Seats	+/–
Cessnock Inds	Daniel Watton	42.43	5	+1
Labor	Jay Suvaal	40.65	6	+1
Independents	N/A	10.47	1	+1
This lists parties that won seats. See the complete results below.

Cessnock City Council is composed of a directly-elected mayor and four multi-member wards electing three councillors each.

In January 2024, D Ward councillor Paul Paynter left Cessnock Independents to join the Liberal Party, which won three seats in 2021. However, the Liberals are unable to recontest after missing the candidate nomination deadline. B Ward Liberal councillor Karen Jackson formally endorsed Labor.

Olsen Independents became "Cessnock Independents" in 2023, and B Ward councillor Ian Olsen announced in January 2024 that he would not seek re-election.

=== Cessnock mayor ===
2024 New South Wales mayoral elections: Cessnock
Party	Candidate	Votes	%	±%
Cessnock Independents	Daniel Watton	19,606	49.35	+22.10
Labor	Jay Suvaal	16,806	42.30	−0.52
Greens	Llynda Nairn	3,317	8.35	−2.63
Total formal votes		39,729	94.01	−2.18
Informal votes		2,530	3.81	+2.18
Turnout		42,259	85.44	
Two-candidate-preferred result
Cessnock Independents	Daniel Watton	20,452	53.71	+13.23
Labor	Jay Suvaal	17,624	46.29	−13.23
Cessnock Independents gain from Labor		Swing	+13.23	

=== Cessnock results ===
2024 New South Wales local elections: Cessnock
Party	Votes	%	Swing	Seats	Change
Cessnock Independents	16,245	42.43	+17.4	5	▲1
Labor	15,563	40.65	−1.8	6	▲1
Independents	4,008	10.47	+9.4	1	▲1
Animal Justice	1,393	3.64	+3.6	0	Steady
Greens	1,080	2.82	−7.1	0	Steady
Formal votes	38,289	90.75	−3.24		
Informal votes	3,905	9.25	+3.24		
Total	42,194	100.00			

=== A Ward ===
2024 New South Wales local elections: A Ward
Party	Candidate	Votes	%	±%
Cessnock Independents	1. Jessica Jurd (elected); 2. Tracey Harrington (elected); 3. Sharon Kennedy	5,751	59.06	+30.87
Labor	1. Jay Suvaal (elected); 2. James Hawkins; 3. Charlie McLennan	2,906	29.84	−5.83
Greens	1. Llynda Nairn; 2. Greg Gilmour; 3. Averil Drummond	1,080	11.09	+0.32
Total formal votes		9,737	92.57	−0.22
Informal votes		782	7.43	+0.22
Turnout		10,519	85.48	+1.89

=== B Ward ===
2024 New South Wales local elections: B Ward
Party	Candidate	Votes	%	±%
Labor	1. Christopher Madden (elected); 2. Fatmata Bangura; 3. Steve George	3,724	38.89	
Cessnock Independents	1. Quintin King (elected); 2. Naomi Smith; 3. Col Caban	2,815	29.40	
Independent	1. Sarah Pascoe (elected); 2. Brett King; 3. Brendan Peel	3,037	31.71	
Total formal votes		9,576	90.65	
Informal votes		988	9.35	
Turnout		10,564	84.04	

=== C Ward ===
2024 New South Wales local elections: C Ward
Party	Candidate	Votes	%	±%
Labor	1. Sophie Palmowski (elected); 2. Mitchell Lea (elected); 3. Anne Sander	4,824	48.87	
Cessnock Independents	1. Daniel Watton; 2. Mark Mason (elected); 3. Jack Franklin	4,076	41.29	
Independent	1. Nick Maher; 2. Rachael Thomas; 3. Cameron Derewianka-Bowes	971	9.84	
Total formal votes		9,871	89.91	
Informal votes		1,108	10.09	
Turnout		10,979	85.52	

=== D Ward ===
2024 New South Wales local elections: D Ward
Party	Candidate	Votes	%	±%
Labor	1. Mitchell Hill (elected); 2. Rosa Grine (elected); 3. Deb Dunne	4,109	45.13	
Cessnock Independents	1. Sue Dixon (elected); 2. Chris Parker; 3. Dave Cocking	3,603	39.57	
Animal Justice	1. Victoria Davies; 2. Graeme Davies; 3. Anne McCondach	1,393	15.30	
Total formal votes		9,105	89.86	
Informal votes		1,027	10.14	
Turnout		10,132	86.29	

== Dungog ==
2024 Dungog Shire Council election
- 14 September 2024

All 6 seats on Dungog Shire Council (Note: Excluding the mayor, who is directly-elected.) 4 seats needed for a majority
	First party	Second party
	IND
Party	Independents	Labor
Last election	4 seats	Did not contest
Seats before	4	0
Seats won	3	1
Seat change	▼1	▲1
First preference vote	4,047	753
Percentage	66.20%	12.32%
Swing	▼10.46	▲12.32
	Third party	Fourth party
	IND	IND
Party	Ind. National	Ind. Labor
Last election	1 seat	1 seat
Seats before	1	1
Seats won	1	1
Seat change	Steady	Steady
First preference vote	664	649
Percentage	10.86%	10.62%
Swing	▼2.63	▲0.77
Largest party before election
Independents
Subsequent largest party
Independents

Dungog Shire Council is composed of three two-member wards, totalling six councillors, along with − starting at the 2024 election − a directly-elected mayor.

Labor endorsed one candidate for the election, while there were two Independent Labor candidates contesting.

=== Dungog results ===
2024 New South Wales local elections: Dungog
Party	Votes	%	Swing	Seats	Change
Independents	4,047	66.20	−10.46	3	▼1
Labor	753	12.32	+12.32	1	▲1
Independent National	664	10.86	−2.63	1	Steady
Independent Labor	649	10.62	+0.77	1	Steady
Formal votes	6,113	93.19	−2.15		
Informal votes	447	6.81	+2.15		
Total	6,560	100.0		6	
Registered voters | turnout	7,565	86.72	+0.13		

=== A Ward ===
2024 New South Wales local elections: A Ward
Party	Candidate	Votes	%	±%
Independent National	Michael Dowling (elected)	664	33.57	−8.10
Independent	Liam Ley (elected)	549	27.76	+27.76
Independent	John Connors	367	18.55	+5.27
Independent Labor	Michael Tobin	220	11.12	−19.28
Independent	Tony Edwards	91	4.60	+4.60
Independent	Stephen Farrow	87	4.40	−10.25
Total formal votes		1,978	95.33	−0.29
Informal votes		97	4.67	+0.29
Turnout		2,075	86.82	−0.60

=== B Ward ===
2024 New South Wales local elections: B Ward
Party	Candidate	Votes	%	±%
Independent	Stephen Low (elected)	498	24.02	−20.87
Independent	Alan Green	449	21.66	+2.34
Independent Labor	James Campbell (elected)	429	20.69	+20.69
Independent	Karen Drinan	384	18.52	+18.52
Independent	Jessica Clark	313	15.10	−20.69
Total formal votes		2,073	92.05	−3.68
Informal votes		179	7.95	+3.68
Turnout		2,252	85.34	−1.38

=== C Ward ===
2024 New South Wales local elections: C Ward
Party	Candidate	Votes	%	±%
Labor	Alexandria Carruthers (elected)	753	36.52	+36.52
Independent	Fred Paton (elected)	692	33.56	+33.56
Independent	Bradley Bale	617	29.92	−0.11
Total formal votes		2,062	92.34	−2.33
Informal votes		171	7.66	+2.33
Turnout		2,233	88.05	+2.39

== Maitland ==
2024 Maitland City Council election
- 14 September 2024

All 13 seats on Maitland City Council 7 seats needed for a majority
- Registered: 69,121
- Mayor
- Turnout: 86.30% (▼0.47)
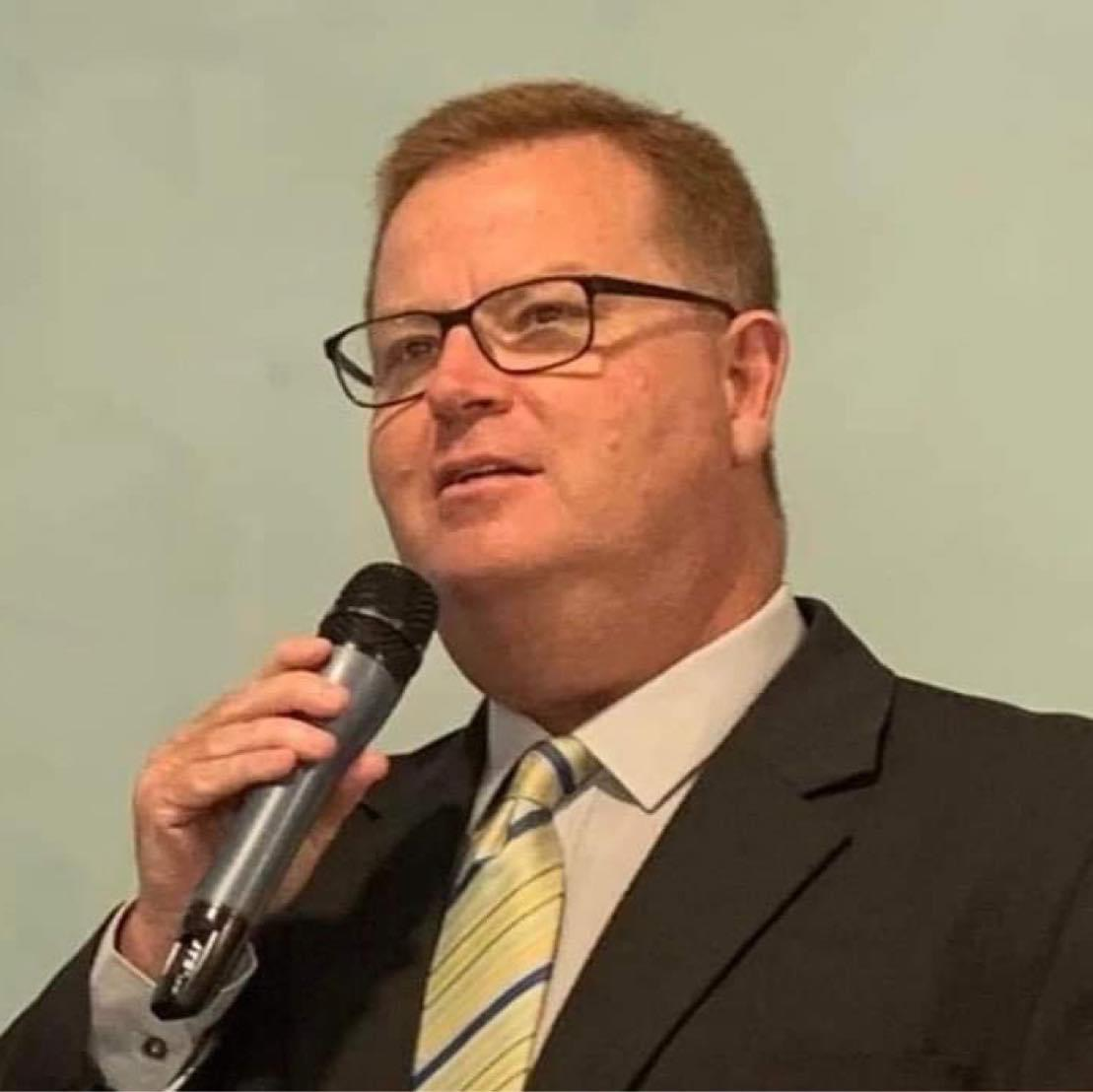

	First party	Second party
Candidate	Philip Penfold	Ben Whiting
Party	Penfold Inds	Labor
Primary vote	31,701	17,473
Percentage	55.63%	30.66%
Swing	▲21.36	▼0.96
TCP	62.90%	37.10%
TCP swing	▲11.56	▼11.56
Mayor before election
Philip Penfold
Penfold Independents
Elected Mayor
Philip Penfold
Penfold Independents
- Councillors
- Turnout: 86.1%
Party	Leader	Vote %	Seats	+/–
Penfold Independents	Philip Penfold	40.7	6	+2
Labor	Ben Whiting	34.8	4	0
Liberal	Sally Halliday	5.7	1	−3
Ind. Liberal	N/A	4.5	1	+1
This lists parties that won seats. See the complete results below.

Maitland City Council is composed of four three-member wards, totalling 12 councillors, as well as a directly-elected mayor.

Starting at this election, Central Ward was known as Ward 1, North Ward as Ward 2, East Ward as Ward 3 and West Ward as Ward 4.

The Liberal Party was unable to recontest the mayoral election, Ward 2, Ward 3 and Ward 4 after missing the candidate nomination deadline. Liberal Ward 2 councillor Mitchell Griffin became an Independent Liberal shortly before nominations closed in order to stay on the ballot. He endorsed both Penfold Independents and the Independent National group in Ward 4.

=== Maitland mayor ===
2024 New South Wales mayoral elections: Maitland
Party	Candidate	Votes	%	±%
Penfold Independents	Philip Penfold	31,701	55.63	+21.36
Labor	Ben Whiting	17,473	30.66	–0.96
Greens	Campbell Knox	5,675	9.96	+6.10
Independent	Shahriar (Sean) Saffari	2,133	3.74	+1.24
Total formal votes		56,982	95.52	–1.14
Informal votes		2,670	4.48	+1.14
Turnout		59,652	86.30	–0.47
Two-candidate-preferred result
Penfold Independents	Philip Penfold	33,401	62.90	+11.56
Labor	Ben Whiting	19,702	37.10	–11.56
Penfold Independents hold		Swing	+11.56	

=== Maitland results ===
2024 New South Wales local elections: Maitland
Party	Votes	%	Swing	Seats	Change
Penfold Independents	22,450	40.7	+12.7	6	▲2
Labor	19,199	34.8	−2.9	4	Steady
Liberal	3,141	5.7	−17.6	1	▼3
Independent Liberal	2,478	4.5	+4.5	1	▲1
Greens	6,388	11.6	+6.3	0	Steady
Independent National	1,501	2.7	+2.7	0	Steady
Independents	65	0.1	-6.1	0	Steady
Formal votes	55,222	92.7			
Informal votes	4,322	7.3			
Total	59,544	100.0			
Registered voters / turnout	69,121	86.1			

=== Ward 1 ===
2024 New South Wales mayoral elections: Ward 1
Party	Candidate	Votes	%	±%
Labor	1. Amelia Atkinson (elected 1); 2. Loretta Baker; 3. Aidan Foy	5,350	37.2	−1.1
Penfold Independents	1. Ken Jordan (elected 2); 2. Tony Robinson; 3. Jodie Jordan	4,205	29.2	+8.4
Liberal	1. Sally Halliday (elected 3); 2. Rod Doherty; 3. Carol Doherty	3,141	21.8	−3.7
Greens	1. Campbell Knox; 2. Natalie Masterton; 3. Kayla Jacobs	1,638	11.4	+1.5
Independent	Matthew Leonard	65	0.5	
Total formal votes		14,399	94.1	
Informal votes		906	5.9	
Turnout		15,305	86.0	

=== Ward 2 ===
2024 New South Wales mayoral elections: Ward 2
Party	Candidate	Votes	%	±%
Labor	1. Rachel Barstow (elected 1); 2. Michael Voorbij; 3. Robert Aitchison	4,780	34.8	+3.5
Penfold Independents	1. Kristy Flannery (elected 2); 2. Nicole Yarrington; 3. Gary Ferguson	4,250	30.9	+3.3
Independent Liberal	1. Mitchell Griffin (elected 3); 2. Larissa Griffin; 3. Selby Green	2,478	18.0	−0.5
Greens	1. Paul Johns; 2. Jenny Rooke; 3. Dennis Thurlow	2,228	16.2	+8.7
Total formal votes		13,736	91.9	
Informal votes		1,218	8.1	
Turnout		14,954	86.8	

=== Ward 3 ===
2024 New South Wales mayoral elections: Ward 3
Party	Candidate	Votes	%	±%
Penfold Independents	1. Bill Hackney (elected 1); 2. Ben Worth (elected 3); 3. Christopher Vollmer	6,948	50.3	+21.7
Labor	1. Ben Whiting (elected 2); 2. Andrew Raw; 3. Peta Lindsay	5,295	38.3	−4.9
Greens	1. Michael Jacobs; 2. Jan Davis; 3. Keryn Jacobs	1,575	11.4	
Total formal votes		13,818	92.8	
Informal votes		1,073	7.2	
Turnout		14,891	85.3	

=== Ward 4 ===
2024 New South Wales mayoral elections: Ward 4
Party	Candidate	Votes	%	±%
Penfold Independents	1. Phillip Penfold (elected mayor); 2. Mike Yarrington (elected 1); 3. Warrick Penfold (elected 3)	7,047	53.1	+16.7
Labor	1. Donald Ferris (elected 2); 2. Brendan Pyne; 3. Carolyn Sinclair	3,774	28.4	−10.8
Independent National	1. Melanie Shortland; 2. Marilyn Alex; 3. Judith Brown	1,501	11.3	
Greens	1. Jessie McDonnell; 2. Wendy White; 3. Errin O'Brien	947	7.1	
Total formal votes		13,269	92.2	
Informal votes		1,125	7.8	
Turnout		14,394	86.5	

== Muswellbrook ==
2024 Muswellbrook Shire Council election
- 14 September 2024

All 12 seats on Muswellbrook Shire Council 7 seats needed for a majority
	First party	Second party
	IND	IND
Party	Independents	Independent Labor
Seats won	11	1
Largest party before election
Independents
Largest party after election
Independents

Muswellbrook Shire Council is composed of twelve councillors elected proportionally to a single ward.

=== Muswellbrook results ===
2024 New South Wales local elections: Muswellbrook
Party	Candidate	Votes	%	±%
Independent	1. Jeffrey Drayton (Ind. Labor) (elected 1); 2. Louise Dunn (elected 5); 3. Claire Bailey (elected 7); 4. Stephen Ward (elected 11); 5. Rachel McInnes; 6. Tracey Vicary	3,107	35.1	+19.5
Independent	1. De-Anne Douglas (elected 2); 2. Rod Scholes (elected 6); 3. David Hartley (elected 12); 4. Kristin Goodhew; 5. Dane Scandurra; 6. Heidi Hartley	1,934	21.9	+12.8
Independent	1. Max Morris (elected 3); 2. Jacinta Ledlin; 3. Tim Williams; 4. Megan Black; 5. Andrew Reynolds; 6. Thomas Griffin	1,242	14.1	
Independent	Mahajan Rohit (elected 4)	863	9.8	−2.1
Independent	Darryl Marshall (elected 8)	567	6.4	−0.4
Independent	Graeme McNeill (elected 10)	464	5.3	+0.2
Independent	Amanda Barry (elected 9)	452	5.1	−3.9
Independent	Mark Bowditch	86	1.0	−1.3
Independent	Jennifer Lecky	52	0.6	−6.2
Independent	Graham "Dick" Varley	45	0.5	
Independent	Kim Granger	31	0.4	
Total formal votes		8,843	90.4	
Informal votes		942	9.6	
Turnout		9,785	81.9	

== Newcastle ==
2024 Newcastle City Council election
- 14 September 2024

All 13 seats on Newcastle City Council 7 seats needed for a majority
- Registered: 126,400
- Lord Mayor
- Turnout: 84.21% (▲1.16)
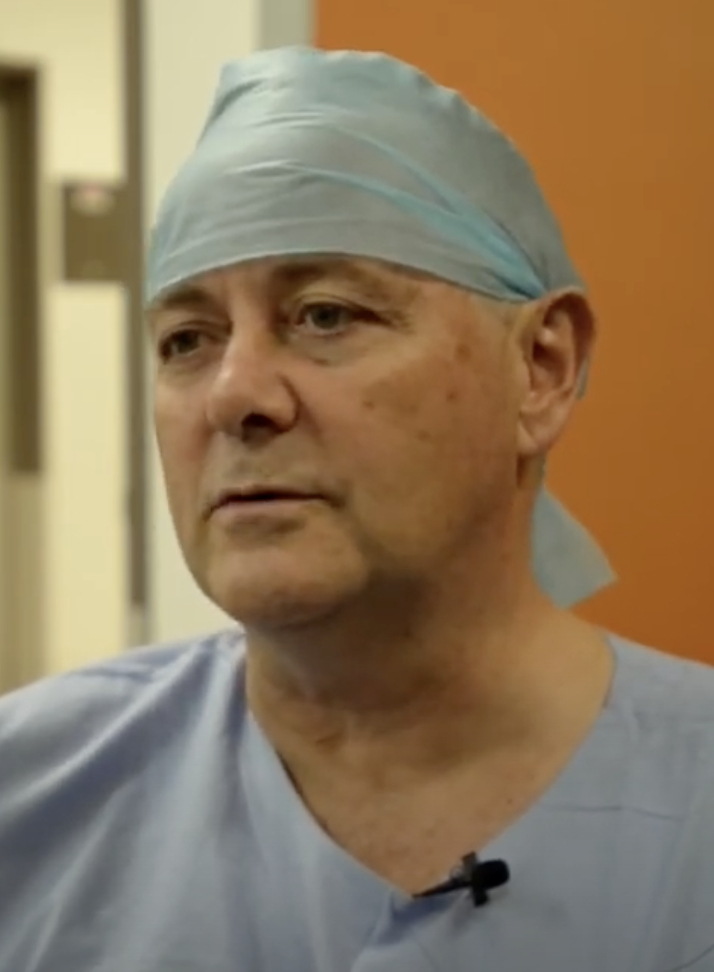

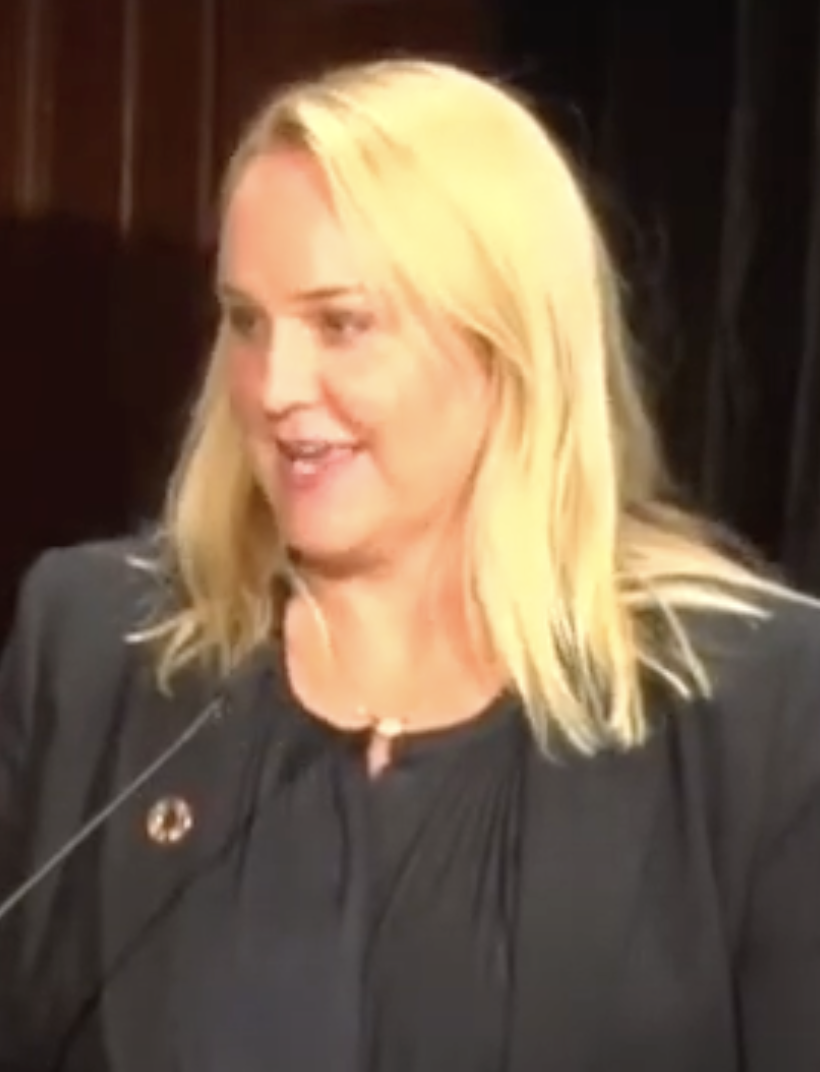

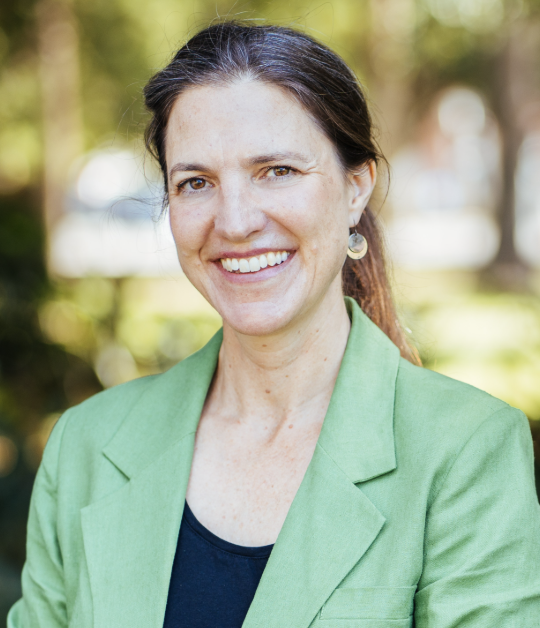

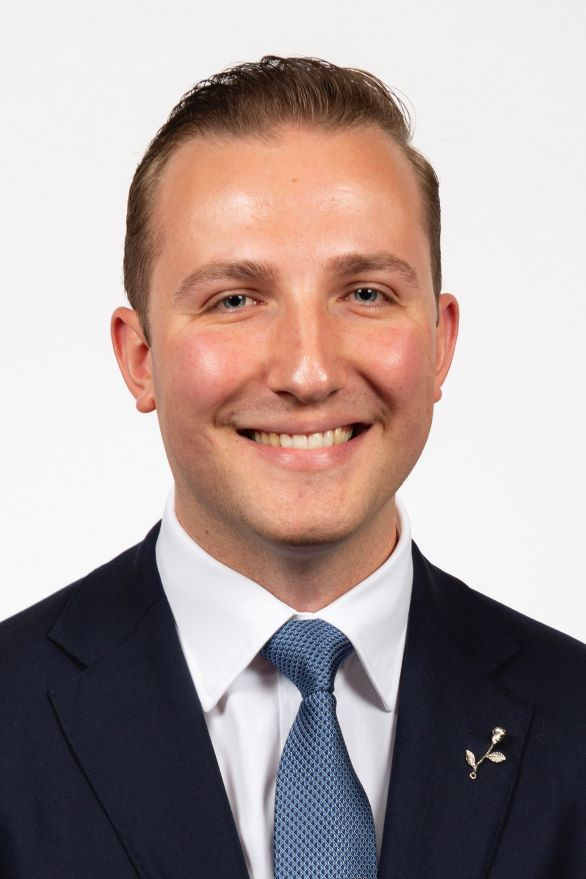
	First party	Second party
Candidate	Ross Kerridge	Nuatali Nelmes
Party	Our Newcastle	Labor
Primary vote	35,350	32,759
Percentage	34.47%	31.94%
Swing	▲34.47	▼9.96
TCP	51.68%	48.32%
TCP swing	▲51.68	▼11.68
	Third party	Fourth party
Candidate	Charlotte McCabe	Callum Pull
Party	Greens	Liberal
Primary vote	15,656	13,167
Percentage	15.27%	12.84%
Swing	▲1.07	▲1.14
Lord Mayor before election
Nuatali Nelmes
Labor
Elected Lord Mayor
Ross Kerridge
Our Newcastle
- Councillors
Party	Leader	Vote %	Seats	+/–
Labor	Nuatali Nelmes	35.6	5	−1
Our Newcastle	Ross Kerridge	23.5	2	+2
Greens	Charlotte McCabe	20.9	3	+1
Liberal	Callum Pull	16.7	2	−1
This lists parties that won seats. See the complete results below.

Newcastle City Council is composed of a directly-elected mayor and four multi-member wards electing three councillors each.

=== Newcastle lord mayor ===
2024 New South Wales mayoral elections: Newcastle
Party	Candidate	Votes	%	±%
Independent	Ross Kerridge	35,350	34.47	+34.47
Labor	Nuatali Nelmes	32,759	31.94	–9.96
Greens	Charlotte McCabe	15,656	15.27	+1.07
Liberal	Callum Pull	13,167	12.84	+1.14
Independent	Milton Caine	2,965	2.89	+2.89
Socialist Alliance	Steve O'Brien	2,662	2.60	+0.7
Total formal votes		102,559	96.35	–0.96
Informal votes		3,890	3.65	+0.96
Turnout		106,449	84.21	+1.16
Two-candidate-preferred result
Independent	Ross Kerridge	42,169	51.68	+51.68
Labor	Nuatali Nelmes	39,426	48.32	–11.68
Independent gain from Labor				

=== Newcastle results ===
2024 New South Wales local elections: Newcastle
Party	Votes	%	Swing	Seats	Change
Labor	35,324	35.6	−5.2	5	▼1
Our Newcastle	23,306	23.5	+23.5	2	▲2
Greens	20,719	20.9	+4.3	3	▲1
Liberal	16,594	16.7	−1.7	2	▼1
Christians For Community	2,581	2.6	+2.58	0	Steady
Socialist Alliance	707	0.7	−0.2	0	Steady
Independents	87	0.1	+0.08	0	Steady
Formal votes	99,319	93.5			
Informal votes	6,924	6.5			
Total	106,243				

=== Ward 1 ===
2024 New South Wales local elections: Ward 1
Party	Candidate	Votes	%	±%
Labor	1. Declan Clausen (elected 1); 2. Sandra Feltham; 3. Rachel Smoothy	7,491	30.9	−3.5
Greens	1. Charlotte McCabe (elected 2); 2. Catherine Burgess; 3. Simon West	6,018	24.9	+2.7
Our Newcastle	1. Ross Kerridge; 2. Peter Gittins (elected 3); 3. Emily Coker	6,010	24.8	+19.62
Liberal	1. Rochelle Manning; 2. Lucas Lee; 3. Colin Peebles	3,903	16.1	+3.0
Socialist Alliance	1. Steve O'Brien; 2. Samantha Ashby; 3. Stefani Strazzari	707	2.9	−0.9
Independent	Deborah Mackenzie	50	0.2	
Independent	Grant Osland	37	0.2	
Total formal votes		24,216	94.6	
Informal votes		1,369	5.4	
Turnout		25,585	81.5	

=== Ward 2 ===
2024 New South Wales local elections: Ward 2
Party	Candidate	Votes	%	±%
Labor	1. Paige Johnson (elected 1); 2. Carol Duncan; 3. Justine Clark	7,867	30.4	−6.2
Liberal	1. Jenny Barrie (elected 2); 2. Paul McNamara; 3. Natarsha Mann	6,593	25.5	+2.7
Greens	1. Joel Pringle (elected 3); 2. Greg Giles; 3. Sophie McAuley	5,906	22.8	+1.5
Our Newcastle	1. Leisha Parkinson; 2. John Beach; 3. Christine Everingham	5,535	21.4	
Total formal votes		25,901	94.4	
Informal votes		1,534	5.6	
Turnout		27,435	83.8	

=== Ward 3 ===
2024 New South Wales local elections: Ward 3
Party	Candidate	Votes	%	±%
Labor	1. Nuatali Nelmes (elected 1); 2. Peta Winney-Baartz; 3. Margaret Wood; 4. Phillip Millard	9,225	38.0	−6.0
Our Newcastle	1. Mark Brooker (elected 2); 2. Michelle Brown; 3. Alyssa Lochrin	7,380	30.4	+19.4
Greens	1. Sinead Francis-Coan (elected 3); 2. Siobhan Isherwood; 3. Anne Rooke-Frizell	5,366	22.1	+9.0
Christians For Community	1. Katrina Wark; 2. Milton Caine; 3. Andrew Weatherstone	2,324	9.6	+9.6
Total formal votes		24,295	93.2	
Informal votes		1,765	6.8	
Turnout		26,060	84.1	

=== Ward 4 ===
2024 New South Wales local elections: Ward 4
Party	Candidate	Votes	%	±%
Labor	1. Elizabeth Adamczyk (elected 1); 2. Deahnna Richardson (elected 3); 3. Jimmy Scott	10,741	43.1	−5.3
Liberal	1. Callum Pull (elected 2); 2. Beniamino Gigli; 3. Edward Hayes	6,098	24.5	+8.0
Our Newcastle	1. Tahlia Kelso; 2. Julie Davies; 3. Wayne Rogers	4,382	17.6	
Greens	1. Rebecca Watkins; 2. Graham Whittall; 3. Phillip Maher	3,429	13.8	+4.0
Christians For Community	1. Timothy Boyce; 2. Anna Harris	257	1.0	
Total formal votes		24,907	91.7	
Informal votes		2,256	8.3	
Turnout		27,163	86.7	

== Port Stephens ==
2024 Port Stephens Council election
- 14 September 2024

All 9 seats on Port Stephens Council 6 seats needed for a majority

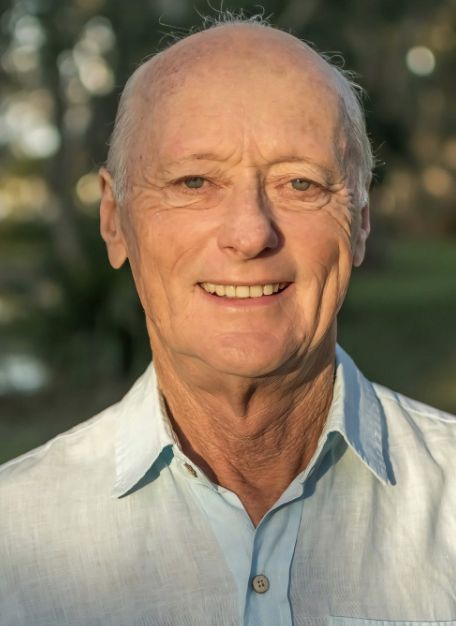
	First party	Second party
		SPS
Leader	Leah Anderson	Mark Watson
Party	Labor	Save PS
Last election	4 seats	Did not exist
Seats before	4	0
Seats won	4	1
Seat change	Steady	▲1
	Third party	Fourth party
Leader	Nathan Errington	Kim Scott
Party	Liberal	Greens
Last election	1 seat	0 seats
Seats before	1	0
Seats won	1	0
Seat change	Steady	Steady
Largest party before election
Independents
Subsequent largest party
TBD

Port Stephens Council is composed of three three-member wards, as well as a directly-elected mayor.

"Save Port Stephens" has been formed as a group for the election, contesting the mayoral election, Central Ward and East Ward. The group also chose Neil Turner as their West Ward lead candidate, but ended up not contesting that ward.

Incumbent Liberal councillor Matt Bailey is not seeking re-election in East Ward after winning preselection for Ward 3 on the City of Newcastle.

=== Port Stephens results ===
2024 New South Wales local elections: Port Stephens
Party	Votes	%	Swing	Seats	Change
Labor	19,936	42.64%	+1.04%	4	-
Liberal	4,534	9.70%	+0.60%	1	-
Greens	1,234	2.64%	–0.76%	0	-
Save Port Stephens	5,159	11.03%	+11.03%	1	+1
Independents	15,896	34.00%	–11.90%	3	–1
Formal votes	46,759	91.54%			
Informal votes	4,322	8.46%			
Turnout	51,081				

=== Central ===
2024 New South Wales local elections: Central Ward
Party	Candidate	Votes	%	±%
Labor	1. Jason Wells (elected 1); 2. Kelly Hammond; 3. Beverly Rabbit	6,330	38.82%	
Save Port Stephens	1. Scott Leech; 2. Scott Schultz; 3. Neville Sutrin; 4. George Trinkler	2,059	12.63%	
Independent	1. Chris Doohan (elected 2); 2. Rosanne Colling; 3. Jaike Doohan	4,869	29.86%	
Independent	1. Ben Niland (elected 3); 2. Steve Tucker; 3. Nathan Ashpole	3,048	18.69%	
Total formal votes		16,306	90.48%	
Informal votes		1,716	9.52%	
Turnout		18,022		

=== East ===
2024 New South Wales local elections: East Ward
Party	Candidate	Votes	%	±%
Labor	1. Leah Anderson (elected Mayor); 2. Roz Armstrong (elected 1); 3. Mackenzie Goring; 4. Sharon Smart	6,230	41.26%	
Liberal	1. Nathan Errington (elected 2); 2. Katy McHugh; 3. Geoffrey McHugh	4,534	30.03%	
Greens	1. Kim Scott; 2. Mark Adamski; 3. Jane Rich	1,234	8.17%	
Save Port Stephens	1. Mark Watson (elected 3); 2. Jamie Green; 3. Troy Radford	3,100	20.53%	
Total formal votes		15,098	93.60%	
Informal votes		1,033	6.40%	
Turnout		16,131		

=== West ===
2024 New South Wales local elections: West Ward
Party	Candidate	Votes	%	±%
Labor	1. Giacomo Arnott (elected 2); 2. Peter Francis (elected 3); 3. Sue Sneesby; 4. Lea Harris; 5. David Jones	7,376	48.04%	
Independent	1. Paul Le Mottee (elected 1); 2. Joshua Moxey; 3. Huxley Rowe	5,329	34.71%	
Independent	1. Peter Kafer; 2. Lea Smith; 3. Nathan Avnell	2,650	17.26%	
Total formal votes		15,355	90.71%	
Informal votes		1,573	9.29%	
Turnout		16,928		

== Singleton ==
2024 Singleton Council election
- 14 September 2024

All 9 seats on Singleton Council 6 seats needed for a majority
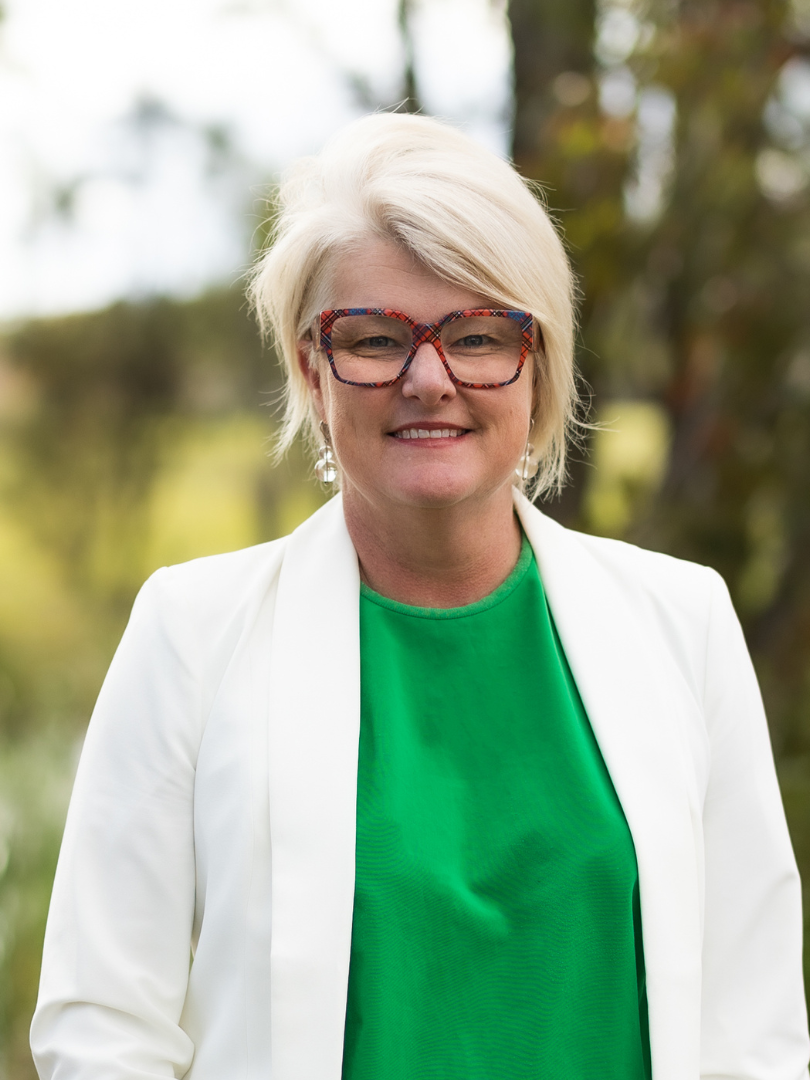

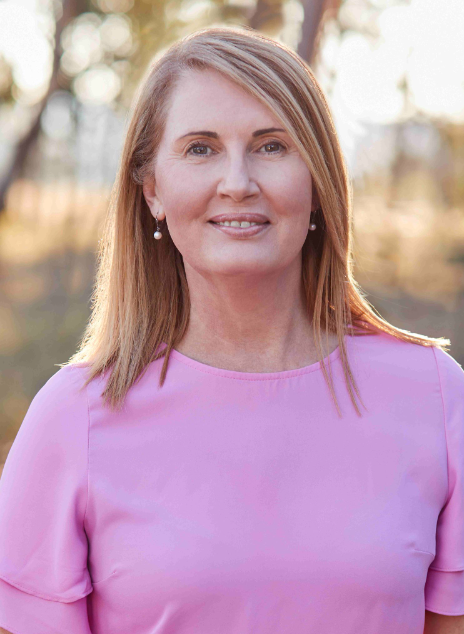

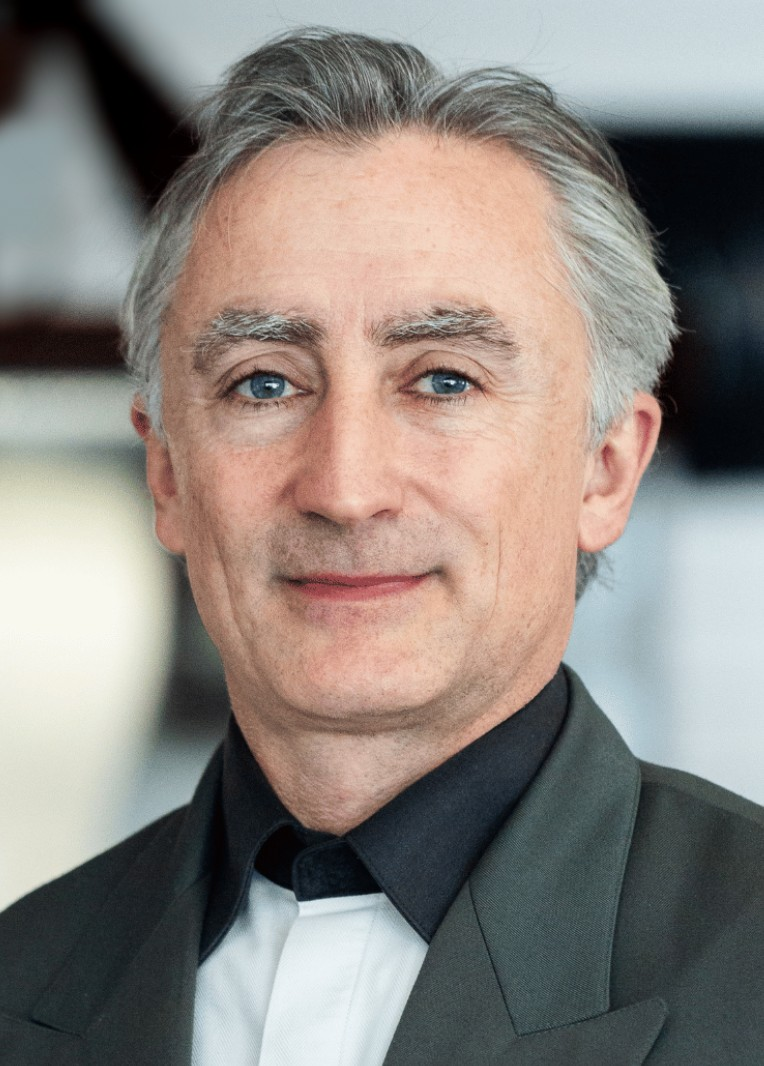
	First party	Second party
	IND
Leader	N/A	Peree Watson
Party	Independents	Labor
Last election	6 seats	2 seats
Seats before	7	2
Seats won	6	2
	Third party	Fourth party
Leader	Louise Scott	Scott Yeomans
Party	Greens	Libertarian
Last election	Did not contest	Did not contest
Seats before	0	0
Seats won	0	1
Largest party before election
Independents
Subsequent largest party
TBD

Singleton Council is composed of nine councillors elected proportionally to a single ward, as well as a directly elected mayor.

At the 2021 election, seven independents were elected, as well as one Labor member and one Shooters, Fishers and Farmers Party (SFFP) member. However, the election was re-run in 2022 after the New South Wales Electoral Commission's online voting system crashed, preventing 55 people in Singleton from casting their vote.

All councillors elected in 2021 were re-elected in 2022 with the exception of independent Belinda Charlton, who was defeated by Labor's Sarah Johnstone.

Councillor Malinda McLachlan left the SFFP in December 2022 after comments made by party leader Robert Borsak. As a result, SFFP is not recontesting Singleton in 2024, while McLachlan is running as an independent.

The Greens and the Libertarian Party are contesting for the first time.

=== Singleton results ===
2024 New South Wales local elections: Singleton
Party	Candidate	Votes	%	±%
Independent	Sue Moore (elected Mayor)	3,318	26.11	+1.85
Independent	Danny Thompson (elected 3)	2,945	23.17	+5.50
Labor	1. Peree Watson (elected 1); 2. Patrick Thompson (elected 9); 3. Timothy McGeachie	1,987	15.63	
Independent	Malinda (Mel) McLachlan (elected 2)	1,638	12.89	−2.46
Independent	Godfrey Adamthwaite (elected 5)	677	5.33	−1.72
Independent	Hollee Jenkins (elected 6)	672	5.29	+1.61
Libertarian	Scott Yeomans (elected 8)	493	3.88	
Independent	Sue George (elected 4)	457	3.60	+1.30
Greens	Louise Scott	397	3.12	
Independent	Anne McGowan (elected 7)	126	0.99	
Total formal votes		12,710	85.19	
Informal votes		2,210	14.81	
Turnout		14,920	83.79%	

== Upper Hunter ==
2024 Upper Hunter Shire Council election
- 14 September 2024

All 9 seats on Upper Hunter Shire Council 5 seats needed for a majority
	First party	Second party
	IND	IND
Party	Independents	Ind. National
Last election	6 seats	2 seats
Seats before	6	2
Largest party before election
Independents
Subsequent largest party
Independents

Upper Hunter Shire Council is composed of nine councillors elected proportionally to a single ward.

In December 2022, Greens councillor Sue Abbott resigned from council after she was reported to the Office of Local Government while on compassionate leave following the death of her son. A countback was won by independent Belinda McKenzie, and the Greens are not re-contesting Upper Hunter.

On 1 May 2024, councillor Elizabeth Flaherty was dismissed from council following claims of "antagonism" and bullying complaints. An appeal from Flaherty to review the dismissal was itself dismissed several weeks later.

Flannery, McKenzie, Ron Campbell and Lee Watts are not contesting the election.

=== Upper Hunter results ===
2024 New South Wales local elections: Upper Hunter
Party	Candidate	Votes	%	±%
Independent	Maurice Collison (elected)	1,197	14.6	−5.5
Independent	Peter McGill (elected)	1,173	14.3	
Independent	George Fraser (elected)	1,038	12.7	
Independent	Troy Stolz (elected)	893	10.9	
Independent	Tayah Clout (elected)	653	8.0	+3.0
Independent	Earle Shields (elected)	624	7.6	
Independent National	Pat Ryan (elected)	595	7.3	
Independent	Adam Williamson (elected)	582	7.1	+1.6
Independent National	Allison McPhee (elected)	573	7.0	+1.2
Independent National	James Burns	539	6.6	+0.6
Independent	Christopher Richards	338	4.1	
Total formal votes		8,205	92.5	
Informal votes		669	7.5	
Turnout		8,874	84.1	
