= 2026 Newcastle lord mayoral by-election =

- 18 April 2026
- Turnout: 104,520
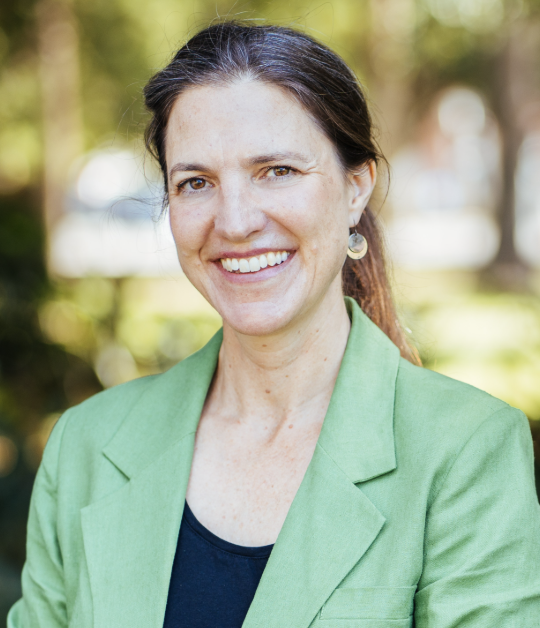

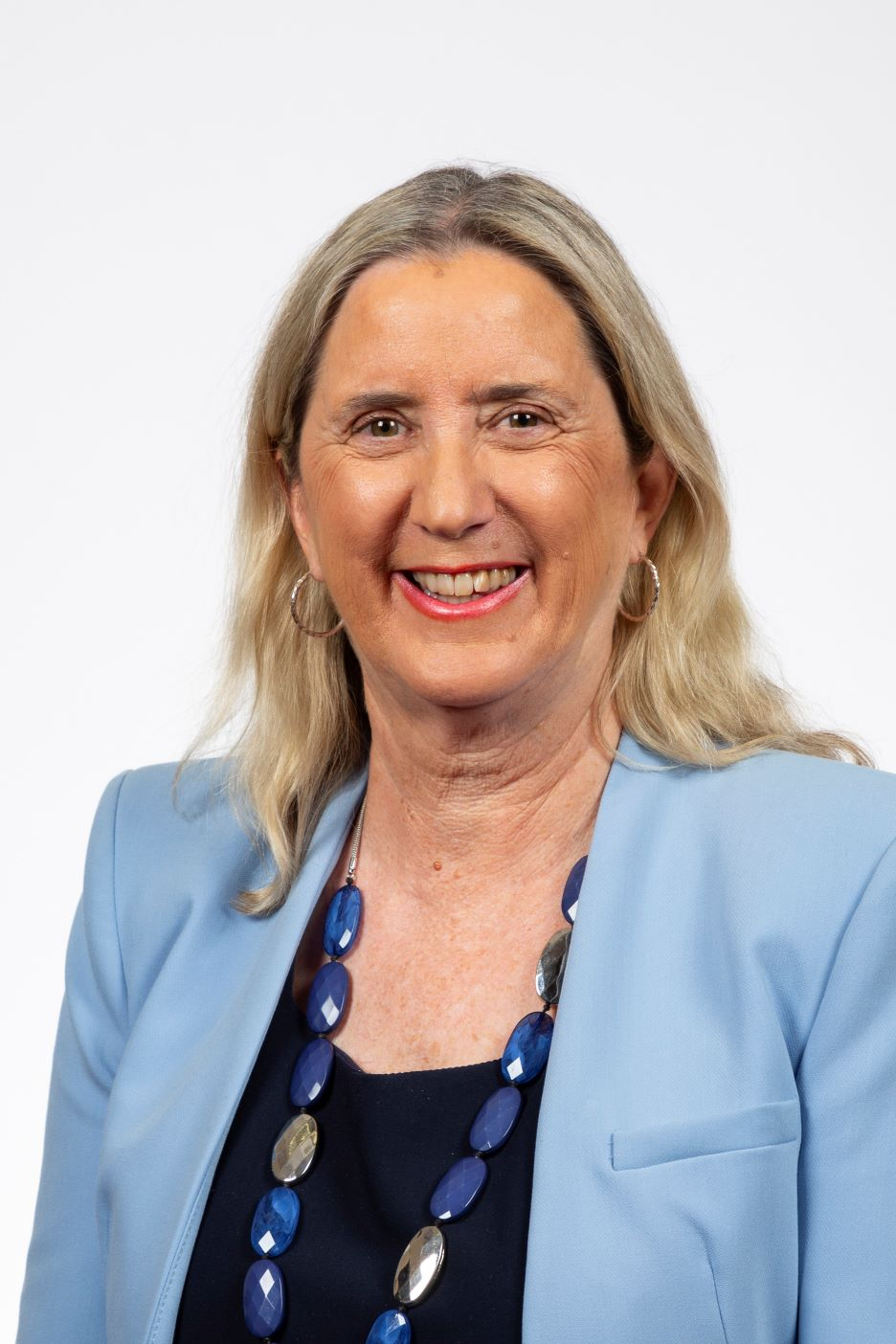
	IND
Candidate	Gavin Morris	Charlotte McCabe
Party	Independent	Greens
Primary vote	52,946	19,916
Percentage	51.82%	19.49%
TCP	67.69%	32.31%
	ALP
Candidate	Declan Clausen	Jenny Barrie
Party	Labor	Liberal
Primary vote	16,725	7,318
Percentage	16.37%	7.16%
Lord Mayor before election
Ross Kerridge
Independent
Elected Lord Mayor
Gavin Morris
Independent

A by-election was held on 18 April 2026 to elect the lord mayor of the City of Newcastle. The vacancy was triggered by the resignation of Lord Mayor Ross Kerridge to focus on his health.

Independent candidate Gavin Morris was elected in a landslide with over 67% of the two-candidate preferred vote.

== Background ==
Newcastle is a city that is traditionally dominated by the Labor Party. In July 2024, after losing an internal party pre-selection for the lord mayoralty, local anaesthetist Ross Kerridge announced that he intended to resign from the party and run as an independent. In that year's local government election, Kerridge won the Lord Mayoral election. In February 2026, Kerridge announced his intention to resign due to side-effects of recent cancer treatment.

Ward 1 Councillor and Deputy Lord Mayor Charlotte McCabe announced that she would run for the mayoralty as the Greens candidate.

Former NBN news presenter and weatherman, Gavin Morris, announced he would run as an independent; outgoing Lord Mayor Ross Kerridge endorsed Morris.

Ward 4 Liberal Councillor and former Deputy Lord Mayor Callum Pull announced that he would not nominate for the by-election. He endorsed fellow Liberal and Ward 2 Councillor Jenny Barrie. Barrie was later endorsed by the party as the Liberal candidate.

Ward 1 Councillor and former Deputy Lord Mayor Declan Clausen announced his intention to run for Labor Party pre-selection. He was later endorsed by the party as their candidate.

Before nominations closed, Stephen O'Brien announced he would stand as Socialist Alliance candidate, and Milton Caine announced he would stand as an independent.

=== Previous results ===
2024 New South Wales mayoral elections: Newcastle
Party	Candidate	Votes	%	±%
Independent	Ross Kerridge	35,350	34.47	+34.47
Labor	Nuatali Nelmes	32,759	31.94	–9.96
Greens	Charlotte McCabe	15,656	15.27	+1.07
Liberal	Callum Pull	13,167	12.84	+1.14
Independent	Milton Caine	2,965	2.89	+2.89
Socialist Alliance	Steve O'Brien	2,662	2.60	+0.7
Total formal votes		102,559	96.35	–0.96
Informal votes		3,890	3.65	+0.96
Turnout		106,449	84.21	+1.16
Two-candidate-preferred result
Independent	Ross Kerridge	42,169	51.68	+51.68
Labor	Nuatali Nelmes	39,426	48.32	–11.68
Independent gain from Labor				

== Candidates ==
Nominations for the by-election closed on Wednesday, 18 March 2026.

=== Declared ===
Candidates as they appeared on the ballot paper were:

Party	Candidate	Background
Socialist Alliance	Stephen O’Brien	Perennial candidate, former ironworker, TAFE worker and librarian
Independent	Gavin Morris	Former NBN news presenter (2009–2025)
Greens	Charlotte McCabe	Councillor for Ward 1 (2021–present) and Deputy Lord Mayor (2025–present)
Liberal	Jenny Barrie	Councillor for Ward 2 (2021–present)
Labor	Declan Clausen	Councillor for Ward 1 (2015–present) and former Deputy Lord Mayor (2017–2024)
Independent	Milton Caine	Perennial candidate and wheelchair-accessible taxi driver

=== Declined ===
- Nuatali Nelmes, former Lord Mayor (2014–24) and Councillor for Ward 3 (2008–14, 2024–25)
- Callum Pull, former Deputy Lord Mayor (2024–25) and Councillor for Ward 4 (2021–present)
- Carol Duncan, former radio presenter and former Councillor for Ward 2 (2017–24)

== Results ==
At the election, first time candidate Gavin Morris secured 51.84 percent of the first preference votes and 67.69 percent of the two-candidate preferred vote count. Greens candidate Charlotte McCabe secured a 4.22 percent swing to her party and Labor's Declan Clausen had a significant primary vote drop of 15.57 percent, resulting in Labor being removed from the two-candidate preferred count and final result.

2026 Newcastle lord mayoral by-election
Party	Candidate	Votes	%	±%
Independent	Gavin Morris	52,946	51.82	+51.82
Greens	Charlotte McCabe	19,916	19.49	+4.22
Labor	Declan Clausen	16,725	16.37	−15.57
Liberal	Jenny Barrie	7,318	7.16	−5.68
Socialist Alliance	Stephen O’Brien	3,025	2.96	+0.36
Independent	Milton Caine	2,241	2.19	−0.7
Total formal votes		102,171	97.75	+1.4
Informal votes		2,349	2.25	−1.4
Two-candidate-preferred result
Independent	Gavin Morris	60,169	67.69	+67.69
Greens	Charlotte McCabe	28,718	32.31	+32.31
Independent hold		Swing		
