= Lord Mayor of Newcastle =

The term Lord Mayor of Newcastle may apply to:

- The Lord Mayor of Newcastle-upon-Tyne, England
- The Lord Mayor of Newcastle (New South Wales)

== See also ==
- The Mayor of Newcastle-under-Lyme
