= List of mayors of Canada Bay =

Mayor of Canada Bay
- Incumbent; Michael Megna since 25 January 2024
- Appointer: Canada Bay City Council
- Term length: 4 years
- Inaugural holder: Michael Wroblewski
- Formation: 12 December 2000
- Deputy: Joseph Cordaro

This is a list of the mayors of the City of Canada Bay, a local government area of New South Wales, Australia.

The current mayor is Michael Megna, who was appointed in January 2024 following the dismissal of Angelo Tsirekas and elected in his own right at the September 2024 local government elections.

== Mayors ==
=== 2000–present ===
No.	Image	Mayor	Party	Term start	Term end
1		Michael Wroblewski	Independent	12 December 2000	2001
2		Carmel DelDuca	Independent	2001	17 September 2002
3		Angelo Tsirekas	Labor	17 September 2002	21 June 2016
–		Helen McCaffrey (acting)	Liberal	21 June 2016	9 September 2017
		Angelo Tsirekas	Labor	9 September 2017	19 October 2021
(3)		Angelo Tsirekas	Our Local Community	19 October 2021	13 December 2023
–		Joseph Cordaro (acting)	Our Local Community	13 December 2023	25 January 2024
4		Michael Megna	Liberal	25 January 2024	incumbent

== Deputy mayors ==
=== 2000–present ===
No.	Image	Deputy Mayor	Party	Term start	Term end	Mayor
1		Angelo Tsirekas	Labor	12 December 2000	2001	Wroblewski (Independent)
1		Angelo Tsirekas	Labor	2001	17 September 2002	Del Duca (Independent)
2		Pauline Tyrrell	Greens	17 September 2002	13 April 2004	Tsirekas (Labor)
3		Jeanette O'Hara	Independent	13 April 2004	21 September 2004	Tsirekas (Labor)
4		Neil Kenzler	Labor	21 September 2004	20 September 2005	Tsirekas (Labor)
5		Michael Megna	Liberal	20 September 2005	19 September 2006	Tsirekas (Labor)
(3)		Jeanette O'Hara	Independent	19 September 2006	18 September 2007	Tsirekas (Labor)
(4)		Neil Kenzler	Labor	18 September 2007	21 October 2008	Tsirekas (Labor)
(3)		Jeanette O'Hara	Independent	21 October 2008	21 September 2010	Tsirekas (Labor)
6		Marian O'Connell	Labor	21 September 2010	20 September 2011	Tsirekas (Labor)
(3)		Jeanette O'Hara	Independent	20 September 2011	2 October 2012	Tsirekas (Labor)
(2)		Pauline Tyrrell	Greens	2 October 2012	2 September 2014	Tsirekas (Labor)
7		Tony Fasanella	Labor	2 September 2014	15 September 2015	Tsirekas (Labor)
8		Helen McCaffrey	Liberal	15 September 2015	21 June 2016	Tsirekas (Labor)
N/A	Vacant			21 June 2016	6 September 2016	McCaffrey (acting) (Liberal)
(7)		Tony Fasanella	Labor	6 September 2016	9 September 2017	McCaffrey (acting) (Liberal)
(7)		Tony Fasanella	Labor	9 September 2017	26 September 2017	Tsirekas (Labor/OLC)
9		Marian Parnaby	Labor	26 September 2017	11 September 2018	Tsirekas (Labor/OLC)
10		Charles Jago	Greens	11 September 2018	17 September 2019	Tsirekas (Labor/OLC)
11		Julia Little	Labor	17 September 2019	11 January 2022	Tsirekas (Labor/OLC)
12		Stephanie Di Pasqua	Liberal	11 January 2022	19 September 2023	Tsirekas (Labor/OLC)
13		Joseph Cordaro	Our Local Community	19 September 2023	13 December 2023	Tsirekas (Labor/OLC)
N/A	Vacant			13 December 2023	25 January 2024	Cordaro (acting) (OLC)
(13)		Joseph Cordaro	Our Local Community	25 January 2024	incumbent	Megna (Liberal)

== Election results ==
The most recent election for mayor was held in September 2021, with the next one scheduled for September 2028.

=== 2024 ===
2024 New South Wales mayoral elections: Canada Bay
Party	Candidate	Votes	%	±%
Liberal	Michael Megna	22,437	46.08	
Labor	Andrew Ferguson	18,664	38.33	
Greens	Charles Jago	7,588	15.58	
Total formal votes		48,689		
Informal votes		1,704		
Turnout		50,393		
Two-candidate-preferred result
Liberal	Michael Megna	23,205	50.91	
Labor	Andrew Ferguson	22,374	49.09	
Liberal gain from Our Local Community		Swing	N/A	

=== 2021 ===
2021 New South Wales mayoral elections: Canada Bay
Party	Candidate	Votes	%	±%
Our Local Community	Angelo Tsirekas	18,014	37.1	+37.1
Labor	Julia Little	13,510	27.8	−11.9
Liberal	Michael Megna	10,810	22.3	−15.0
Greens	Charles Jago	3,854	7.9	−1.3
Independent	Daniela Ramondino	2,354	4.8	−8.9
Total formal votes		48,542	97.7	+1.6
Informal votes		1,140	2.3	−1.6
Turnout		49,682	85.4	+5.1
Two-candidate-preferred result
Our Local Community	Angelo Tsirekas	22,936	57.5	+57.5
Labor	Julia Little	16,973	42.5	−12.4
Mayor changed to Our Local Community from Labor		Swing	N/A	

=== 2017 ===
2017 New South Wales mayoral elections: Canada Bay
Party	Candidate	Votes	%	±%
Labor	Angelo Tsirekas	17,589	39.7	−9.7
Liberal	Helen McCaffrey	16,513	37.3	−4.1
Independent	Daniela Ramondino	6,101	13.8	+13.8
Greens	Charles Jago	4,117	9.3	+0.0
Total formal votes		44,320	96.1	
Informal votes			3.9	
Turnout			80.3	
Two-candidate-preferred result
Labor	Angelo Tsirekas	22,083	54.9	
Liberal	Helen McCaffrey	18,177	45.1	
Labor hold		Swing		
