= Blackbutt Reserve =

Nature reserve in New South Wales, Australia

Coordinates: 32.932°S 151.698°E

Blackbutt Reserve is a nature reserve in the Newcastle region of New South Wales, Australia.

== Location ==
Blackbutt Reserve is located between New Lambton and Kotara. The north and west of the reserve is on Lookout Road and the south is on Carnley Avenue. Since the 1960s, captive animals were displayed, and barbecues and picnic tables were gradually added. In 2014, during construction of a new amenity building at the Carnley Avenue Recreation Area, an old brick lined mine shaft from the 19th century was discovered. The recreation area of the reserve known as Richley Reserve was named after Joe Richley, the president of the Northern Parks and Playground Movement, who was very involved in preservation of the reserve. The site currently covers 182 hectares.

== History ==
The area of Blackbutt Reserve was originally a coal mine owned by the Scottish-Australian Mining Company who commenced mining in the area in 1863.

Between 1915 and 1928, S.A.M Company sold small subdivisions in Lambton, New Lambton and Kotara. In 1932, an auction was held on the land, with only 5 of 52 lots being sold. One of the lots that sold was a 17.75 acres portion on Lookout Road, purchased by the Newcastle District Sailors and Soldiers Memorial Institute. Their intention was to provide work for unemployed returned servicemen, and to settle them as farmers on small allotments. The plan proved to be uneconomical and impractical and in March 1938 the land was resumed by the NSW government to form the first official portion of Blackbutt Reserve.

In 1934, Joe Richley, president of the Northern Parks and Playground movement, persuaded New Lambton Council to purchase six hectares of bushland. In 1937, New Lambton Council purchased two adjoining 80 acres blocks, making a total land area of 240 acres.

Parliament passed the Municipal Amalgamation Act 1 in 1938, which allowed small councils to be merged into one larger authority. The land was placed in trusteeship by Newcastle City Council in 1938.

In 1940, Blackbutt Reserve was 144 acres. In 1949, part of Blackbutt Reserve was cut off due to the expansion of Carnley Road.

In 1956, Newcastle City Council purchased another 270 acres from the S.A.M. company. In 1958 part of Blackbutt Reserve was damaged by fire and the introduction of exotic plant species such as lantana.

In 1963, Newcastle City Council began the Blackbutt program as an effort to restore the reserve after it was overtaken by weeds. In 1985, the mining pit was closed and the land was given to Newcastle City Council for residential use. In 1993, the old mine site was renovated and then reopened for public use by Lord Mayor Joy Cummings; it was renamed Richley Reserve.

A small wildlife park exists at the reserve displaying animals such as koalas, wombats, kangaroos, wallabies, possums, echidnas, emus, parrots and goannas.

== Highway No.23 ==
In 1966, it was announced that Highway No.23 was proposed to be built through the middle of Blackbutt Reserve. In July 1966, Newcastle City Council held a meeting to discuss the Department of Main Roads announcement. After much public protest, the Federal Government appointed a committee to examine the environmental impacts of Highway 23 on 23 July 1974. The report recommended that the Highway 23 project did not progress due to its environmental impact including disruption to bird life, impact on trees, reduced soil quality and noise pollution.

== Other proposed projects ==
In 1937 the Mayor of Newcastle, Alderman H Fenton, considered the name "Blackbutt" to be unattractive and suggested that the reserve be named King George V Memorial Park, or Duke of Windsor Reserve. In the 1950s, a large zoo similar to Taronga Park was proposed. The Northern Parks and Playgrounds movement become involved at Blackbutt Reserve in 1953 after rumours of the possibility of establishing a bowling club at the lookout. In 1956, Newcastle City Council wanted to divide the northern part of Blackbutt Reserve into a housing division but, due to public protest, this project was abandoned. In 1958 a Newcastle City Council announced a sub-division but due to pressure by the Northern Parks and Playgrounds Movement and 79 other organizations, it was abandoned. In the 1960s, it was suggested to make the site of the Hunter Valley Botanical Gardens. In 1963, the Department of Education announced a plan to purchase a part of the reserve to build a high school but, due to a campaign led by the Northern Parks and Playgrounds Movement, the minister announced that none of Blackbutt Reserve was going to be used as a high school. In the 1970s, it was suggested to make the site a private school. In the 1990s, it was suggested to build a 60-meter observation tower.
