= Charles Parker (Australian politician) =

Australian politician (1886–1956)

Charles Joseph Parker (13 December 1886 – 31 January 1956) was an Australian politician.

He was born near Newcastle to mining engineer Richard Parker and Amelia Blanch. He was a business manager, and was involved in the Newcastle Chamber of Commerce. He served in World War I from 1917 to 1918 as a corporal in the 4th Battalion, and served as an alderman at Newcastle from 1926 to 1936. He was Mayor of Newcastle from 1931 to 1932. From 1932 to 1934 he was a United Australia Party member of the New South Wales Legislative Council. Parker died in Newcastle in 1956.
