= Angelo Tsirekas =

Australian politician

3rd Mayor of Canada Bay
- In office 17 September 2002 – 21 June 2016
- Preceded by: Carmel Del Duca
- Succeeded by: Helen McCaffrey
- In office 9 September 2017 – 13 December 2023
- Preceded by: Helen McCaffrey
- Succeeded by: Michael Megna

1st Deputy Mayor of Canada Bay
- In office 12 December 2000 – 17 September 2002
- Preceded by: Position established
- Succeeded by: Pauline Tyrrell

Personal details
- Party: Our Local Community (since 2021)
- Other political affiliations: Labor (until 2021)

Angelo Tsirekas is an Australian politician who served as mayor of the City of Canada Bay in New South Wales from 2002 to 2016 and again from 2017 until he was sacked in 2023.

== Political career ==
Tsirekas became mayor of Canada Bay in 2002, and was re-elected in 2004, 2008 and 2012.

In 2016, he was announced as the Labor Party candidate for Reid at the federal election, and subsequently resigned as mayor. He was unsuccessful, finishing with a two-party-preferred vote of 45.31%.

Tsirekas was returned as mayor at the 2017 election with 54.9% of the vote after preferences.

On 19 October 2021, Tsirekas joined Our Local Community after not being re-endorsed by Labor for the December election. He was re-elected, this time with 57.5% of the vote after preferences.

=== ICAC investigation and dismissal ===
On 6 April 2022, it was announced Tsirekas was under investigation by the Independent Commission Against Corruption (ICAC) over allegations he accepted benefits from developer I-Prosperity Group in return for "favourable planning decisions" dating back to 2012.

Tsirekas was suspended as mayor on 9 November 2023 after ICAC found he had engaged in corrupt conduct. It was found he received benefits including overseas flights and accommodation, worth at least $18,800, between 2015 and 2019.

On 13 December 2023, Tsirekas was dismissed as mayor by Minister for Local Government Ron Hoenig. He was banned from civic office for a period of five years.
