= John Christian Reid =

New South Wales mayor and businessman (1873 – 1932)

John Christian Reid JP

Mayor of Newcastle
- In office 8 February 1909 – 2 February 1911
- Preceded by: Andrew Cook
- Succeeded by: Henry Sheddon
- In office 4 February 1914 – 8 February 1915
- Preceded by: Henry Sheddon
- Succeeded by: Robert George Kilgour

Alderman on the Newcastle Borough Council
- In office 7 February 1902 – 4 July 1917
- Constituency: Belmore Ward

Personal details
- Born: 1873 Newcastle, Colony of New South Wales
- Died: 20 March 1932 (aged 58) Belmont, New South Wales, Australia

John Christian Reid, JP (1873 – 20 March 1932) was a New South Wales businessman, yachtsman and alderman, who served several terms as Mayor of Newcastle.

== Early life ==
Reid was born in 1873 in the town of Newcastle, Colony of New South Wales, the grandson of John Reid, a Presbyterian minister, who had emigrated from Renfrewshire, Scotland with his family in 1852. His family was one of many Presbyterian families brought out from Scotland by Rev Dr John Dunmore Lang, with whom his grandfather worked at Scots Church, Sydney. Reid's uncle – his father's younger brother – was Sir George Reid, the future Premier of New South Wales and Prime Minister of Australia.

After being educated at Miss Logan's Preparatory School and Newcastle Superior Public School, Reid joined his father's shipping and insurance firm, John Reid Limited, which he had established in 1862. In 1895, however, he left to become the manager of J. Fenwick & Co., a tugboat business operating in Newcastle harbour, where he was employed until 1909. Reid left to become managing director of the family firm, a position he retained until his death. The Reids eventually rose to be prominent members of Newcastle society. Reid, along with his brother Mark, eventually ran three companies in shipping, travel and wool stores, as well as becoming prominent members in Newcastle yachting.

== Public service ==
Reid eventually stood for office and became an alderman for Belmore Ward on Newcastle Borough Council in 1902, rising to become mayor in 1909 and again in 1910. In July 1904, he was appointed by the French Government to be Consular Agent for France in Newcastle, which he would hold for 28 years, despite his limited grasp of the French language. As French Consul, Reid was closely involved in the rescue and recovery efforts of the cargo and crew of the French sailing ship Adolphe when it was famously wrecked in a storm off Newcastle harbour on 30 September 1904. He also conducted the formal inquiry into the disaster from 5 to 8 October and hosted the subsequent visit to Newcastle by the French Consul-General in Sydney, Georges Biard d'Aunet. In 1912, after having served many years as a councillor on the Newcastle Chamber of Commerce, Reid was elected as vice-president, which he held until he was elected president from 1916 to 1919. In 1914, Reid was elected for a third term as Mayor of Newcastle. Holding the office during the outbreak of the First World War, Reid assisted in encouraging enlistments of able-bodied men into the First Australian Imperial Force.

== Later life and death ==
Retiring from council on 4 July 1917, Reid returned to business but continued his involvement in Newcastle society as the foundation Commodore of the Royal Motor Yacht Club Newcastle Branch when it was established at Toronto in 1927. Reid also involved himself in the Sea Scouts, serving as Assistant District Commissioner, and was a supporter of Newcastle Rugby Union. For his service as Consular Agent, the French Government awarded him on 20 March 1910 with the rank of 'Officier d'Academie' of the Ordre des Palmes Académiques and on 11 March 1929 he was appointed a Chevalier of the Legion d'honneur. In retirement, Reid lived with his family at his residence, "Weroona", in Belmont, which later became the holiday home for the NSW Crippled Children's Association and was demolished in 1979. On 20 March 1932, Reid died aged 58, having complained of indigestion after breakfast that morning. He was survived by his wife Mabel (née Birmingham), daughters Jean and Marian, and his son John, and was buried in Sandgate cemetery after a service at St. Andrew's Presbyterian Church, Newcastle.

Civic offices
Preceded by Andrew Cook	Mayor of Newcastle; 1909 – 1911	Succeeded by Henry Sheddon
Preceded by Henry Sheddon	Mayor of Newcastle; 1914 – 1915	Succeeded by Robert George Kilgour
Business positions
Preceded by H. C. Langwill	President of the Newcastle Chamber of Commerce; 1916 – 1919	Succeeded by H. Ireland
