= 2014 Newcastle lord mayoral by-election =

← 2012	15 November 2014	2017 →
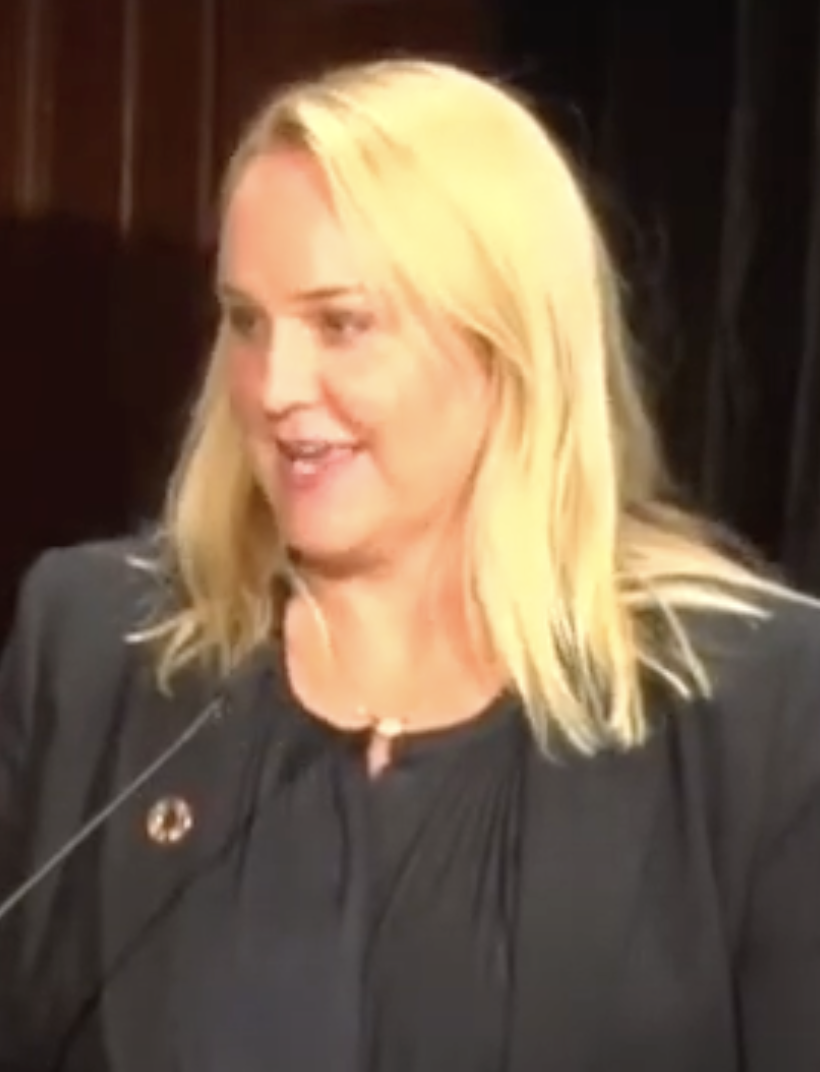

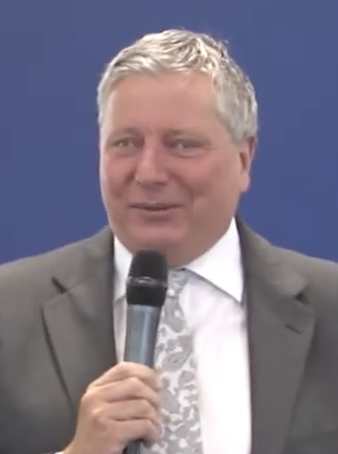

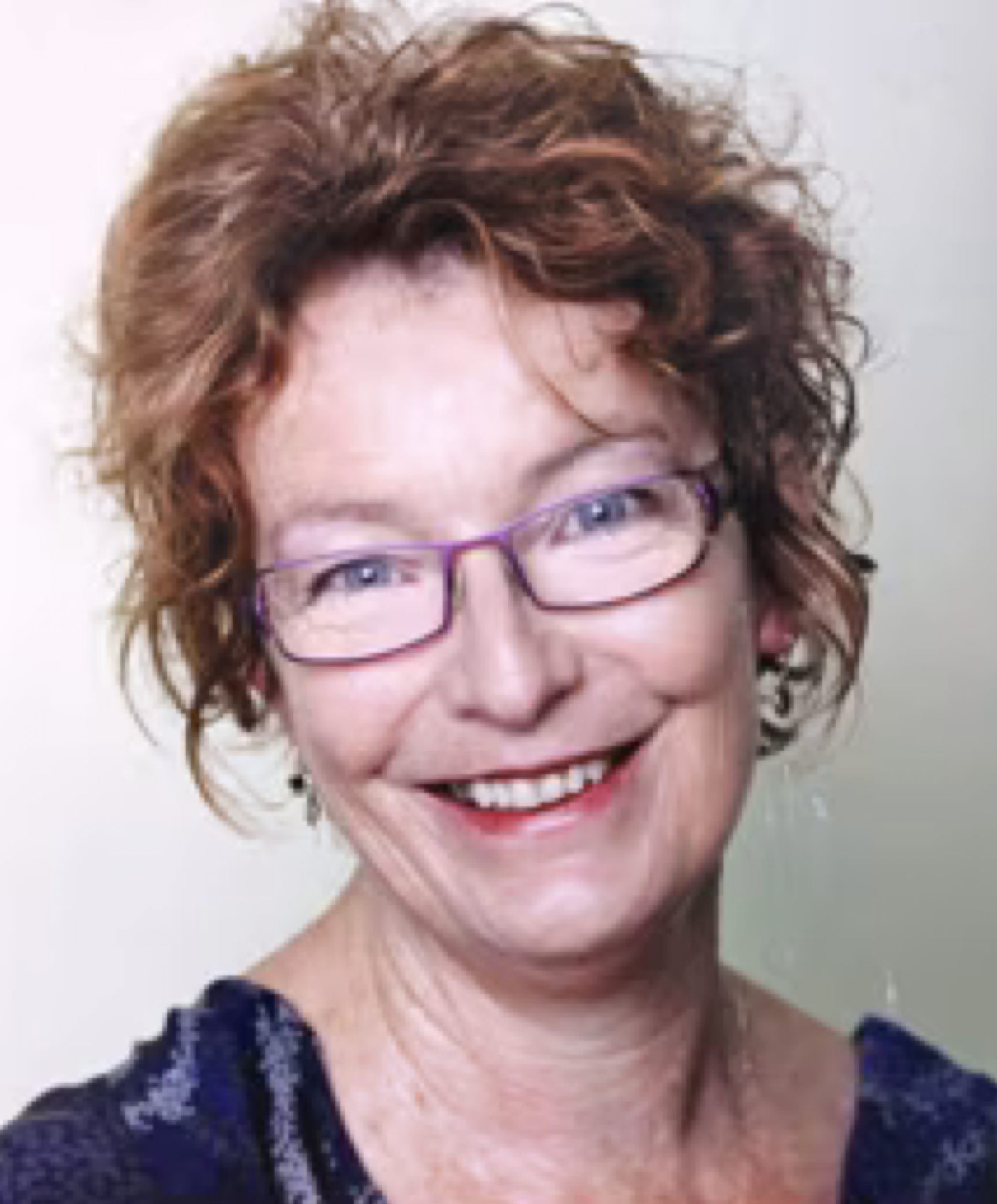
	First party	Second party	Third party
Candidate	Nuatali Nelmes	Brad Luke	Therese Doyle
Party	Labor	Ind. Liberal	Greens
Primary vote	35,198	19,635	11,664
Percentage	42.30%	23.60%	14.02%
After preferences	50.77%	31.89%	17.34%
Lord Mayor before election
Jeff McCloy
Independent
Elected Lord Mayor
Nuatali Nelmes
Labor

The 2014 Newcastle lord mayoral by-election was held on 15 November 2014 to elect the lord mayor of Newcastle, a local government area in New South Wales, Australia. It was held on the same day as two by-elections on Blue Mountains City Council.

The by-election occurred due to the resignation of incumbent Jeff McCloy, who stepped down from office on 17 August 2014 following an Independent Commission Against Corruption inquiry into donations he made to Liberal Party candidates during his tenure as a property developer.

== Results ==
2014 Newcastle lord mayoral by-election
Party	Candidate	Votes	%	±%
Labor	Nuatali Nelmes	35,198	42.30	
Independent Liberal	Brad Luke	19,635	23.60	
Greens	Therese Doyle	11,664	14.02	
Independent	Aaron Buman	9,570	11.50	
Independent	David Chapman	4,240	5.10	
Independent	Rod Holding	1,560	1.87	
Australia First	Joe Ferguson	1341	1.61	
Total formal votes		83,208	94.27	
Informal votes		5,051	5.73	
Turnout		88,259	76.86	
Three-candidate-preferred result
Labor	Nuatali Nelmes	36,446	50.77	
Independent Liberal	Brad Luke	22,892	31.89	
Greens	Therese Doyle	12,451	17.34	
Labor gain from Independent		Swing	N/A	

== See also ==
- 2014 Willoughby mayoral by-election
