= Gavin Morris (politician) =

Australian politician

The Right Worshipful Gavin Morris

Lord Mayor of Newcastle
- Incumbent
- Assumed office 18 April 2026
- Preceded by: Ross Kerridge

Personal details
- Party: Independent
- Spouse(s): Tahnya Morris (div.); Sari Morris
- Occupation: Politician
- Profession: News and Weather presenter
- Website: www.newcastleneeds.com.au

Gavin Scott Morris is an Australian news presenter and politician who is serving as the Lord Mayor of Newcastle since a by-election in April 2026. Prior to his election to civic office, Morris was a news reader and weatherman for NBN Television as well as a presenter on Today for the Nine Network.

== Personal life and career ==
Morris was raised in Woodberry and attended Our Lady of Lourdes Primary at Tarro and Marist Borthers High School at Maitland. He lives in Merewether with his wife and daughter.

Prior to entering politics, Morris was employed early in his career in radio at Triple M (then known as 2MMM-FM), K-Rock and Newcastle's New FM. He worked as a senior presenter with The Weather Channel before commencing as a weather presenter for NBN in 2009.

== Political career ==
In February 2026, the incumbent Lord Mayor of Newcastle, Ross Kerridge, resigned from office for health reasons causing the 2026 Newcastle lord mayoral by-election. Morris announced his candidacy to succeed Kerridge three days later, with Kerridge endorsing Morris.

At the by-election, Morris was elected with a primary vote in excess of 51.0%.

=== Electoral history ===
At the election, first time candidate Gavin Morris secured 51.84 percent of the first preference votes and 67.69 percent of the two-candidate preferred vote count. Greens candidate Charlotte McCabe secured a 4.22 percent swing to her party and Labor's Declan Clausen had a significant primary vote drop of 15.57 percent, resulting in Labor being removed from the two-candidate preferred count and final result.

2026 Newcastle lord mayoral by-election
Party	Candidate	Votes	%	±%
Independent	Gavin Morris	52,946	51.82	+51.82
Greens	Charlotte McCabe	19,916	19.49	+4.22
Labor	Declan Clausen	16,725	16.37	−15.57
Liberal	Jenny Barrie	7,318	7.16	−5.68
Socialist Alliance	Stephen O’Brien	3,025	2.96	+0.36
Independent	Milton Caine	2,241	2.19	−0.7
Total formal votes		102,171	97.75	+1.4
Informal votes		2,349	2.25	−1.4
Two-candidate-preferred result
Independent	Gavin Morris	60,169	67.69	+67.69
Greens	Charlotte McCabe	28,718	32.31	+32.31
Independent hold		Swing		

Civic offices
Preceded by Ross Kerridge	Lord Mayor of Newcastle; 2026–present	Incumbent
