= Joy Cummings =

Australian politician (1923–2003)

Joy Cummings AM

Lord Mayor of Newcastle
- In office September 1977 – 16 April 1984
- Preceded by: Gordon Anderson
- Succeeded by: Don Geddes (Acting)

Lord Mayor of Newcastle
- In office September 1974 – September 1976
- Preceded by: Gordon Anderson
- Succeeded by: Gordon Anderson

Personal details
- Born: Joyce Anne Plumbe; 23 December 1923 Ramsgate, New South Wales
- Died: 1 July 2003 (aged 79) New Lambton Heights, New South Wales
- Party: Australian Labor Party
- Awards: Member of the Order of Australia

Joyce Anne Cummings, AM (née Plumbe; 23 December 1923 – 1 July 2003) was an Australian politician. She was the Lord Mayor of Newcastle, and Australia's first female Lord Mayor, from 1974 to 1976 and again from 1977 until 1984, when she retired from politics following a severe stroke.

== Personal life ==
Cummings was born Joyce Anne Plumbe on 23 December 1923 at Ramsgate, New South Wales, to Charlotte and Dallas Plumbe. She moved to the Newcastle area at the onset of the Second World War when her father, a fireman, was transferred to the Scott Street Brigade. It was here that she met and married Ray Cummings, who was also a fireman, together raising a family of four children.

Cummings is the maternal grandmother of actress Sarah Wynter.

== Political career ==
Cummings became a member of the Australian Labor Party in 1938, at the age of 15, and later entered local politics in 1968. During her political career she was active in promoting environmental and heritage conservation, the arts, local business and industry, and social reforms. Some of her achievements included the preservation of the East End of Newcastle and Cooks Hill, the refurbishment of the Civic Theatre, and the preservation of Blackbutt Reserve and the Shortland Wetlands. She was also a vocal opponent to the closure of the Newcastle State Dockyards. Two significant social reforms was the use by her of Advance Australia Fair during Citizenship Ceremonies in 1977 and the flying of the Aboriginal flag over the town hall, both of which were Australian firsts.

Cummings was appointed a Member of the Order of Australia in 1975 and awarded the Centenary Medal in 2001.

== Death ==
Joy Cummings died at the John Hunter Hospital in Newcastle's New Lambton Heights on 1 July 2003.

== Legacy ==
The Joy Cummings Promenade on Newcastle's harbour foreshore was dedicated in her honour in 2012. The promenade plaque states that Cummings "presided over a period of change, as Newcastle shed its heavy industrial base to become to the city of beauty, vibrancy and diversity that it is today."

A bronze bust of Cummings was unveiled outside of Civic Station in the Newcastle CBD in December 2019. The bust was created by Mudgee-based sculptor and artist Margot Stephens and was overseen by Newcastle City Council. According to the City of Newcastle, Cummings was the first person in Newcastle to have received a bronze bust in their honour at the time.
