= Ross Kerridge =

Australian politician

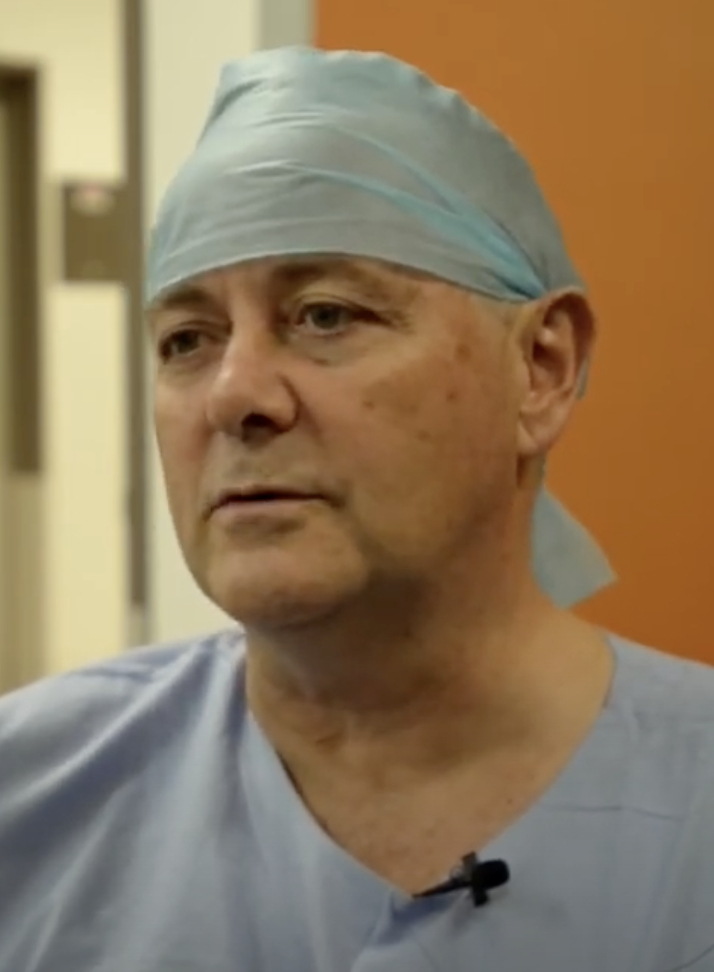
- Kerridge in 2014

Lord Mayor of Newcastle
- In office 14 September 2024 – 9 February 2026
- Deputy: Callum Pull; Charlotte McCabe
- Preceded by: Nuatali Nelmes
- Succeeded by: Gavin Morris

Personal details
- Born: 31 May 1956 (age 69) Newcastle, New South Wales, Australia
- Party: Independent (since 2024)
- Other political affiliations: Labor (1974–2024)
- Spouse: Marion Kerridge
- Education: University of Sydney
- Occupation: Politician, Associate Professor at the University of Newcastle
- Profession: Retired anaesthetist
- Website: newcastle.nsw.gov.au/council/councillors/lord-mayor

Ross Kenneth Kerridge (born 31 May 1956) is an Australian anaesthetist and politician who served as the Lord Mayor of Newcastle from 2024 to 2026.

== Early life and medical career ==
Kerridge was born in Newcastle to parents Dr Gordon Kerridge AM and Catherine Kerridge (née Morley) on 31 May 1956. He is married to Marion and lives in Newcastle East.

His first job upon leaving Newcastle Boys' High School was as a labourer at Newcastle Steelworks before attending the University of Sydney to study a Bachelor of Medicine, Bachelor of Surgery, graduating in 1980. He holds a Fellowship of the Faculty of Anaesthetists, Royal College of Anaesthetists (1986) as well as the Royal Australasian College of Surgeons (1988).

Kerridge was employed at John Hunter Hospital as a Senior Staff Specialist and retired from medicine after election to public office. He is also a Conjoint Associate Professor at the University of Newcastle in the School of Medicine and Public Health.

== Political career ==
Kerridge joined the New South Wales Labor Party at age 18. He was present at Blacktown when prime minister Gough Whitlam launched the 1974 election campaign and at the Sydney Opera House in 1987 when Bob Hawke committed that no child should live in poverty.

Kerridge stood as the Territory Labor candidate for the Northern Territory Legislative Assembly seat of Braitling at the 1983 general election.

In February 2024, Kerridge nominated and lost Labor preselection for the position of Lord Mayor to the incumbent, Nuatali Nelmes. On 19 July 2024, Kerridge submitted a letter of resignation to the Labor Party to contest the Lord Mayoralty of the City of Newcastle at the impending local government election. Labor's Administrative Committee did not accept the resignation and instead, on 23 August 2024, expelled Kerridge and other Labor members that stood on Kerridge's council ticket. Kerridge told the Newcastle Herald that he was "unsurprised" he had been expelled, and "accepted it was party rules". At the time of his resignation letter and subsequent expulsion, Kerridge was a life member of NSW Labor Party.

At the 2024 New South Wales local elections, Kerridge stood as a candidate for Lord Mayor, under the banner 'Our Newcastle'. He campaigned and publicly stated that he continues to support the current state and federal Labor politicians in Newcastle. He received 35,350 primary votes, amounting to 34.47%. In the two-candidate-preferred count, he defeated the incumbent Lord Mayor, Nuatali Nelmes, with 51.68% of the vote compared to her 48.32%. Nelmes conceded defeat by emailing Kerridge on 17 September 2024.

Following the 2024 New South Wales local elections 'Our Newcastle' was established as an incorporated association in January 2025, of which Kerridge was a founding member. It is not registered as a local government party with the New South Wales Electoral Commission.

In 2025, Kerridge temporarily stood down as lord mayor for three months, to have treatment for a "serious medical condition". On 9 February 2026, Kerridge resigned as lord mayor, citing to health issues arising from his cancer treatment. Kerridge endorsed independent candidate Gavin Morris at the resulting by-election, who went on to win the election.

=== Electoral history ===
1983 Northern Territory general election: Braitling
Party	Candidate	Votes	%	±%
Country Liberal	Roger Vale	1,325	77.8	
Labor	Ross Kerridge	377	22.2	
Total formal votes		1,702	97.0	
Informal votes		52	3.0	
Turnout		1,754	79.5	
Country Liberal hold		Swing		

2024 New South Wales mayoral elections: Newcastle
Party	Candidate	Votes	%	±%
Independent	Ross Kerridge	35,350	34.47	+34.47
Labor	Nuatali Nelmes	32,759	31.94	–9.96
Greens	Charlotte McCabe	15,656	15.27	+1.07
Liberal	Callum Pull	13,167	12.84	+1.14
Independent	Milton Caine	2,965	2.89	+2.89
Socialist Alliance	Steve O'Brien	2,662	2.60	+0.7
Total formal votes		102,559	96.35	–0.96
Informal votes		3,890	3.65	+0.96
Turnout		106,449	84.21	+1.16
Two-candidate-preferred result
Independent	Ross Kerridge	42,169	51.68	+51.68
Labor	Nuatali Nelmes	39,426	48.32	–11.68
Independent gain from Labor				

Civic offices
Preceded by Nuatali Nelmes	Lord Mayor of Newcastle; 2024–2026	Succeeded by Gavin Morris
