= Jeff McCloy =

Australian property developer (1949–2025)

Lord Mayor of Newcastle
- In office 8 September 2012 – 17 August 2014
- Deputy: Brad Luke
- Preceded by: John Tate
- Succeeded by: Nuatali Nelmes

Personal details
- Born: 13 October 1949 Belmont, New South Wales, Australia
- Died: 27 June 2025 (aged 75) Sovereign Islands, Paradise Point, Queensland, Australia
- Party: Independent
- Education: University of Newcastle
- Occupation: Chairman, McCloy Group; Engineer

Jeffrey Raymond McCloy (13 October 1949 – 27 June 2025) was an Australian property developer who served as the Lord Mayor of Newcastle between 2012 and 2014. Before entering politics, he ran his own construction company, which built Newcastle's John Hunter Hospital. In 2008, he won the Hunter Business Chamber 2008 Businessperson of the Year, and in 2009 he won the City of Newcastle Medal.

McCloy campaigned for the removal of the rail line through the centre of Newcastle.

In 2012, McCloy met the then Opposition Leader (and future Prime Minister of Australia) Tony Abbott to discuss the future of the Newcastle CBD. In 2013, he held a joint press conference with Abbott and Newcastle victims of the Bali bombings in support of Abbott's proposed legislation to assist victims of terrorism overseas.

McCloy opposed rainbow crossings in support of Gay rights, referring to them as "nonsense", and used council resources to remove them, despite claims they did not breach any laws. After Lake Macquarie and Cessnock councils expressed support for the rainbow crossings, McCloy attacked Cessnock as a "bloody mess" and threatened to arrange for Lake Macquarie City Council chambers to be "chalked with half a ton of chalk".

McCloy appeared at a hearing of the Independent Commission Against Corruption 14 August 2014 relating to Operation Spicer, an investigation into allegations of corrupt conduct in relation to the 2011 elections in New South Wales. He was recalled to give further evidence on Friday 12 September 2014.

Tim Owen, the Liberal member for Newcastle, and Andrew Cornwell, the Liberal member for Charlestown, each admitted accepting amounts of $10,000 from McCloy. As a result, both Owen and Cornwell resigned from parliament on 12 August 2014.

On 17 August 2014, McCloy resigned as Lord Mayor of Newcastle, effective immediately. He said his resignation was due to ongoing controversy over his appearance before the Independent Commission Against Corruption, which he said "may effect [sic] the proper functioning" of Newcastle City Council. The subsequent by-election was won by Nuatali Nelmes.

In 2015, McCloy's attempts to overturn part of a New South Wales Act of Parliament, enacted to prevent developers from making political donations, were rejected by the High Court of Australia. The case was significant in Australian constitutional law, as it clarified the extent to which the Constitution of Australia provides an implied freedom of political communication, and expanded on the proportionality test developed in Lange v Australian Broadcasting Corporation.

== Corruption findings by Independent Commission Against Corruption ==
In 2016, The NSW Independent Commission Against Corruption released a report on their investigation codenamed Operation Spicer. Operation Spicer was an 'Investigation into NSW Liberal Party Electoral Funding for the 2011 State Election Campaign and Other Matters'.

In 2011, Jeff McCloy, as a property developer, was a banned donor, to parties and candidates in state elections as state governments have jurisdiction over land appropriations etc. in Australia. McCloy not only made political donations, he made so many large cash payments to Members of Parliament that he referred to himself in the Independent Commission Against Corruption hearings as a 'Walking ATM'.

The NSW Independent Commission Against Corruption sought to prove that Jeff McCloy intentionally made covert payments to state government election candidates and that McCloy was aware that his donations were illegal because of his 'developer' status.

It was reported by the Sydney Morning Herald that Cardiff vet Andrew Cornwell was in the middle of an operation on a dog when he was summoned outside by McCloy. McCloy handed Cornwell $10,000 in cash, cash that was later used to fund Cornwell's state parliament election campaign.

On 30 August 2016, the Newcastle Herald reported that MCloy called Independent Commission Against Corruption 'A $20m waste of time'. 47% of Fairfax's online respondents agreed with McCloy's view. McCloy described the factual findings against him as 'a parking fine, a speeding fine'.

== Correlation between the corruption findings and McCloy Group developments ==
Listed in the 'Principal Factual Findings made by the NSW Independent Commission Against Corruption in regards to Operation Spicer are the below references to Jeff McCloy.

Finding Reference Group 1: Regarding The Seat of Port Stephens

Quote page 22 of the commission's report: "In 2007, Craig Baumann, the NSW Liberal Party candidate for the seat of Port Stephens, entered into an arrangement with Mr McCloy and Mr (Hilton) Grugeon to disguise from the Election Funding Authority the fact that companies associated with Mr McCloy and Mr Grugeon had donated $79,684 towards Mr Baumann’s 2007 NSW election campaign."

Finding Reference Group 1 Correlation with Development: Craig Baumann held the seat of Port Stephens in the NSW Parliament from 2007 to 2015. McCloy Group has developments within the Port Stephens state seat areas including The Bower (Medowie, NSW) and Potter's Lane (Raymond Terrace, NSW).

Finding Reference Group 2: Regarding The State Seat of Newcastle

Quote page 20 of the commission's report: "In about February 2011, Jeffrey McCloy gave Hugh Thomson $10,000 in cash as a political donation to fund Mr Owen’s 2011 election campaign for the seat of Newcastle with the intention of evading the Election Funding Act laws relating to the ban on the making of political donations by property developers and the applicable cap on political donations.

Quote page 21 of the commission's report: "Mr (Mike) Gallacher was responsible for proposing to Mr McCloy and Mr (Hilton) Grugeon an arrangement whereby each of them would contribute to the payment of Luke Grant for his work on Mr Owen’s 2011 election campaign. He did so with the intention that the Election Funding Act laws in relation to the prohibition on political donations from property developers and the requirements for the disclosure of political donations to the Election Funding Authority would be evaded..."

Quote page 21 of the commission's report: Mr Owen, Mr Thompson, Mr Grugeon and Mr McCloy were parties to an arrangement whereby payments totalling $19,875 made to Mr Grant for his work on Mr Owen’s 2011 election campaign were falsely attributed to services allegedly provided to companies operated by Mr McCloy and Mr Grugeon.

Finding Reference Group 2 Correlation with Development: Part a

Jeff McCloy and McCloy Group has ongoing commercial development concerns within the Newcastle State seat locality, including 'City Exchange' and 'Telstra Civic'. Both sites will benefit significantly from the highly controversial Newcastle Transport Interchange and Light Rail due for completion in 2019, a major infrastructure project implemented by the NSW Liberal state government.

Finding Reference Group 2 Correlation with Development: Part b

McCloy Group's 'City Exchange' is tenanted by a gym owned by Wests Group. Wests Group are a not-for-profit gambling entity that, according to its 2017 Annual Report', made $143m in revenue in the year ending January 2017. As a group whose business interests are primarily involved in gambling, Wests Group are an illegal donor to political candidates in NSW, and as Lord Mayor of Newcastle and proprietor of McCloy group, incomes from Wests Group to Jeff McCloy or McCloy Group are considered indirect political donations.

== Other Hunter Street property concerns ==
Relative to the highly controversial Newcastle Interchange, McCloy bought the Blackwoods property at Hannell St, Wickham in December 2006, the former Hunter Water headquarters at 591 Hunter Street in October 2007 (since subdivided, with the 591-address property sold and the 593-601 address retaining its heritage exterior), and a half shareholding of 356 Hunter Street in 2009. 591 Hunter Street and 356 Hunter Street are multi-block buildings that are on the Light Rail route, planned for completion in 2019.

The Newcastle Herald reported that in late 2007, McCloy bought the former Toymasters building at 615 Hunter Street, which was sold by McCloy in 2009.

As of December 2017, 615 Hunter Street is tenanted by the NSW Department of Family and Community Services. The address 615 Hunter Street Newcastle West is on the Light Rail route.

Also in late 2007, McCloy bought 'the former Churchills building' at 633 Hunter Street Newcastle West, which he sold in February 2015. In 2008, McCloy bought The Lucky Country Hotel, now known as The Lucky, which was one of only two of his Hunter Street purchases that saw development under his tenure.

Over a ten-year spending spree which included Hunter Street properties plus other holdings (a commercial property in Brown Street, a stately 'town' home in Church Street and Bolton Street's 'Legacy House' (now demolished and replaced with apartments) McCloy claimed to have suffered $15.7 million in losses. On 27 June 2025, McCloy died at the age of 75.

Civic offices
Preceded by John Tate	Lord Mayor of Newcastle; 2012–2014	Succeeded by Nuatali Nelmes
