= List of mayors of Orange =

Mayor of Orange City Council
- Incumbent; Tony Mileto since 2024
- Appointer: Orange City Council
- Term length: 4 years
- Inaugural holder: Ald. John Peisley (Chairman); Ald. Patrick Mulholland (Mayor)
- Formation: 9 February 1860 (as Chairman); 1865 (as Mayor)
- Deputy: Cr
- Website: www.orange.nsw.gov.au

The mayor of Orange, is the leader of the Council of the City of Orange, a local government area located in Orange, New South Wales, Australia. The official title of mayors while holding office is: The Mayor of Orange. First incorporated on 9 January 1860 as the Municipality of Orange, on 10 July 1946, the Municipality of Orange was proclaimed as the City of Orange. First meeting on 18 February 1860, the legality of the Constitution of the Orange Municipal Council was questioned in 1866 and was suspended by order of the Supreme Court of New South Wales. With the Municipalities Act 1867, the Council was reconstituted and a new council was elected on 14 February 1868. In 1888, the Municipality of East Orange was proclaimed and merged with the Orange Municipality on 24 December 1912.

The current mayor of Orange is Councillor Tony Mileto. A proposal to elect the mayor by a direct popular vote took effect at the 2017 Local Government Elections. The directly elected mayor will hold office until the next local government election, due in 2028.

== Chairs/Mayors of the Municipality of Orange 1860–1946 ==
#	Years	Chairmen
1	1860–1861	John Peisley
2	1862–1863	George McKay
3	1864	James Dale
#	Years	Mayors
4	1865–1866	Patrick Mulholland
–	1866–1868	Council Suspended
–	1868	James Dale
5	1869	James Dalton
6	1870	John Woodward
7	1871	Patrick Kenna
8	1872	Benjamin Nelson
9	1873	George Weily
–	1874	James Dale
10	1875	Michael Casey
11	1876	Joseph Windred
12	1877	Thomas Dalton
–	1878	Patrick Kenna
13	1879–1880	James Torpy
14	1881	James Stuart Leeds
15	1882	Edward Nathan
–	1883	Joseph Windred
–	1884	Patrick Kenna
16	1885	John McCutcheon Paul
17	1886	Charles James Smith
–	1887	John McCutcheon Paul
18	1888	Patrick Joseph Flanagan
19	1889	Elijah Eyles
20	1890	Henry William Larance
21	1891	Augustus Coulson
22	1892	William Tanner
–	1893	Charles James Smith
23	1894	Andrew Edye
24	1895	Simon Kearney
25	1896–1897	George De Vial Pilcher
–	1898–1899	Patrick Joseph Flanagan
–	1900–1902	Charles James Smith
26	1903–1905	Thomas Garrett Dalton
27	1906	Roderick Plowman
–	1907	Patrick Joseph Flanagan
28	1908–1909	John Swann Withington
29	1910	Edwin Thomas McNeilly
30	1911	Henry Kinghorne McKay
31	1912–1913	Edwin Thomas McNeilly
32	1914	Sir Neville Howse
–	1914–1917	Edwin Thomas McNeilly
33	1918	William Earnest Bouffler
34	1919–1920	George Treweeke
–	1921	Sir Neville Howse
35	1921–1922	Valentine Henry Millard
36	1923–1924	Arthur Colvin
–	1924	Valentine Henry Millard
–	1925–1929	Arthur Colvin
37	1930	Samuel Whitmee
38	1931	Stuart Lamrock
39	1932–1934	A. W. Blowes
–	1935	Arthur Colvin
40	1936–1944	Dr Walter Frederick Matthews
41	1945–1946	John Percival Jaeger

== Mayors of the Municipality of East Orange 1888–1912 ==
#	Years	Mayors
1	1888–1889	Josiah Parker
2	1890	William Samuel Stabback
3	1891	J. Middleton
–	1891–1893	William Samuel Stabback
4	1894	William Pulbrook
–	1895–1897	William Samuel Stabback
5	1898–1899	John Velvin
6	1900	Thomas Charles Bowen
–	1901	John Velvin
–	1902	Thomas Charles Bowen
7	1903–1905	J. W. Chalmers
8	1906–1909	William Spurway
9	1911–1912	J. McKeon
10	1912	William H. Gow

== Mayors of the City of Orange 1946–present ==
#	Years	Mayors
–	1946–1947	John Percival Jaeger
–	1948–1950	Dr Walter Frederick Matthews
–	1951–1953	John Percival Jaeger
42	1954–1955	George Ernest Francis White
43	1956–1957	Alan Ridley
44	1958–1960	Louie Cassey
45	1961	Gordon Graham Machin
46	1962	Clive Arthur Hamer
47	1963–1967	Ronald John Hill
48	1968	Reginald Joseph Cutcliffe
49	1969–1971	Ronald Thomas
50	1972–1974	Frederick Sinclair Dobbin
–	1974–1981	Ronald Thomas
51	1981–1983	Richard John Niven
52	1983–1991	Timothy John Sullivan
53	1991–1996	John Norman Davies
–	1996–2002	Richard John Niven
54	2002–2004	John Frederick Miller
55	2004–2008	John Davis
56	2008–2009	Reginald Allan Kidd
–	2009–2017	John Davis
–	2017–2021	Reginald Allan Kidd
57	2021–2024	Jason Hamling
58	2024–Present	Tony Mileto \g

== Electoral results ==
=== 2024 ===
2024 New South Wales mayoral elections: Orange
Party	Candidate	Votes	%	±%
Independent	Tammy Greenhalgh	4,120	16.66	
Greens	David Mallard	1,316	5.32	–10.18
Independent	Melanie McDonell	2,653	10.73	
Independent	Kevin Duffy	4,847	19.61	+3.43
Labor	Jeff Whitton	2,795	11.31	+1.67
Independent	Tony Mileto	5,867	23.73	+4.44
Independent	Gerald Power	3,125	12.64	
Total formal votes		24,723	95.31	–0.54
Informal votes		1,217	4.69	+0.54
Turnout		25,940	84.24	–0.14
Two-candidate-preferred result
Independent	Tammy Greenhalgh	6,135	44.26	
Independent	Tony Mileto	7,726	55.74	+7.52
Independent gain from Team Hamling		Swing		

=== 2021 ===
2021 New South Wales mayoral elections: Orange
Party	Candidate	Votes	%	±%
Team Hamling	Jason Hamling	5,082	20.9	+20.9
For Our Future	Tony Mileto	4,698	19.3	+7.7
Independent	Kevin Duffy	3,940	16.2	+3.9
Greens	Neil Jones	3,775	15.5	+7.6
Independent	Amanda Spalding	3,369	13.8	+13.8
Independent Labor	Jeff Whitton	2,349	9.6	+2.4
Independent	Lesley Smith	192	0.8	+0.8
Total formal votes		24,355	95.9	+0.5
Informal votes		1,054	4.1	−0.5
Turnout		25,409	84.4	−1.1
Two-candidate-preferred result
Team Hamling	Jason Hamling	7,089	51.8	+51.8
For Our Future	Tony Mileto	6,602	48.2	+48.2
Team Hamling gain from Independent		Swing	N/A	

=== 2017 ===
2017 New South Wales mayoral elections: Orange
Party	Candidate	Votes	%	±%
Independent	Reg Kidd	5,196	21.9	+21.9
Independent National	Russell Turner	4,522	19.0	+19.0
Independent	Kevin Duffy	2,926	12.3	+12.3
Independent	Tony Mileto	2,017	8.5	+8.5
Greens	Stephen Nugent	1,885	7.9	+7.9
Independent	Scott Munro	1,842	7.8	+7.8
Independent Labor	Jeff Whitton	1,717	7.2	+7.2
Independent	Paula Townsend	1,621	6.8	+6.8
Independent	Chris Gryllis	1,462	6.2	+6.2
Independent	Ron Gander	576	2.4	+2.4
Total formal votes		23,764	95.4	N/A
Informal votes			4.6	N/A
Turnout			85.5	N/A
Two-candidate-preferred result
Independent	Reg Kidd	7,159	54.1	+54.1
Independent National	Russell Turner	6,084	45.9	+45.9
Independent win		Swing	N/A	

- This was the first time the position of mayor of Orange was directly elected
- John Davis (Independent) was the incumbent mayor, having been first elected in 2009
