= Nuatali Nelmes =

Australian politician

The Right Worshipful Nuatali Nelmes
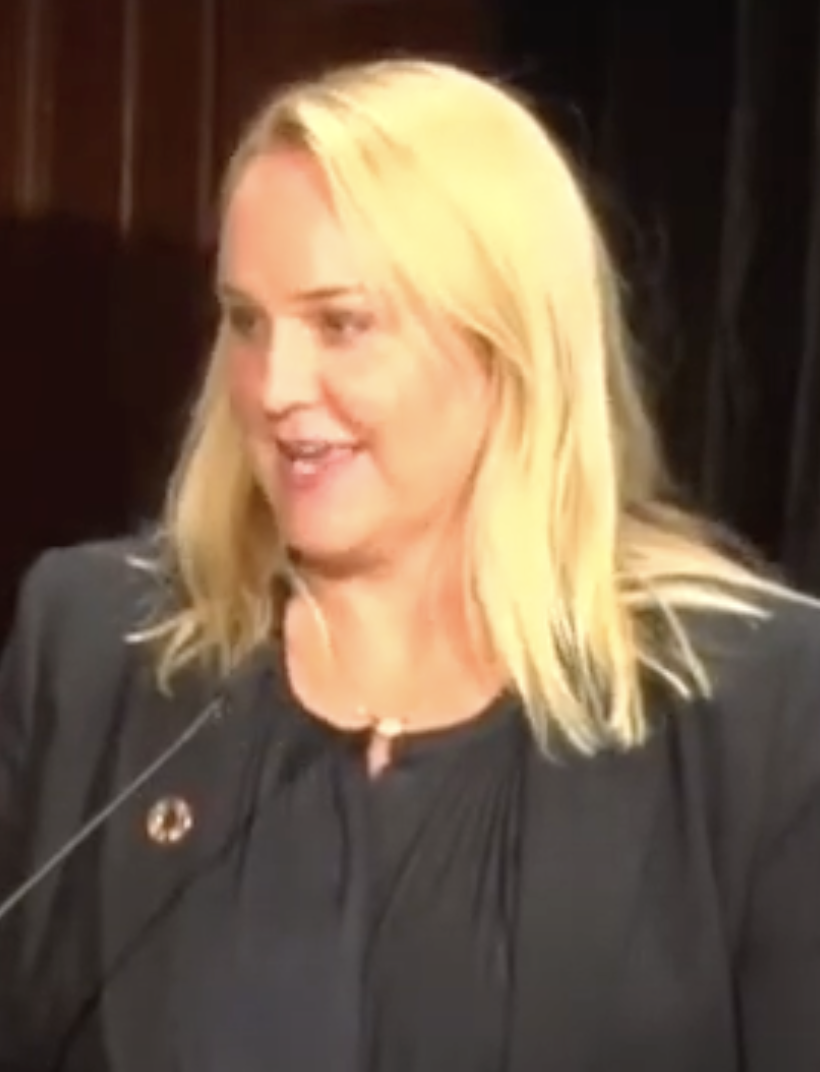

Lord Mayor of Newcastle
- In office 15 November 2014 – 14 September 2024
- Deputy: Stephanie Posniak (2014) Andrea Rufo (2014–15); Michael Osbourne (2015-16); Jason Dunn (2016-17) Declan Clausen (2017–24)
- Preceded by: Jeff McCloy
- Succeeded by: Ross Kerridge

Personal details
- Born: Nuatali Josephine Scobie
- Party: Labor
- Spouse: Stuart Nelmes
- Education: University of Newcastle
- Website: www.nuatalinelmes.com

Nuatali Josephine Nelmes is an Australian politician who served as Lord Mayor of Newcastle from a by-election in 2014 until her defeat at the 2024 local elections. She is the youngest person to ever serve as Newcastle lord mayor. Prior to this, she served as a councillor on the Newcastle City Council since 2008. In 2025, Nelmes resigned as a councillor, concluding more than 16 years in office.

== Career ==
Nelmes studied a business degree in industrial relations and marketing at the University of Newcastle, and joined the Labor Party when she was 20. She was elected to the City of Newcastle council in 2008, succeeding her father, long-serving Labor councillor Paul Scobie. She was the Labor candidate for Lord Mayor at the 2012 election, and was endorsed by former state MP Jodi McKay, but was defeated by developer and conservative independent candidate Jeff McCloy. She stood for the Senate in the unwinnable fifth position on the Labor ticket at the 2013 federal election, and nominated for preselection for the 2014 Newcastle state by-election, losing to fellow councillor Tim Crakanthorp. She has also served as a member of the Labor Party's national policy forum.

In mid-2014, McCloy resigned as Lord Mayor after becoming involved in a corruption investigation into illegal donations to MPs in the region. Nelmes was again the Labor candidate at the resulting by-election, and was successful, receiving 42% of the vote to closest rival and conservative independent Brad Luke's 24%. Nelmes campaigned on restoring trust, protecting and improving services particularly public transport, Newcastle railway line, supports funding the Newcastle Art Gallery expansion, and urban renewal in the inner city. She has also supported a Newcastle bid for the 2030 Commonwealth Games. Nelmes is only the second female Lord Mayor of Newcastle after popular 1970s-era mayor Joy Cummings. Her victory also resulted in Labor taking control of the local, state and federal political offices in Newcastle for the first time since 1998.

In March 2017, Newcastle Liberal Councillor Lisa Tierney resigned from her position, citing alleged "bullying and harassment" inflicted by Lord Mayor Nelmes as the reason for her departure

In April 2017, Nelmes came under scrutiny for her corporate credit card expenses, which totalled over $30,000 over a two-year period. The expenses included charges for five-star hotel stays, room service, Wi-Fi, excess baggage, and miscellaneous items such as chewing gum and caramel slices. Additionally, a 400-page expense report revealed further expenditures, including accommodation for singer Kamahl and purchases of "living" probiotic water. An external consultant's report found that some of Nelmes's food expense claims breached the council's expense rules.

In July 2017, the keys to the city of Newcastle were granted to reality TV star Jackie Gillies, a friend of Nelmes. This decision sparked criticism from some residents who questioned the validity of the honour, suggesting that there were more deserving candidates within the community. Critics also raised concerns that Nelmes may have used the occasion to feature herself on the reality TV show "The Real Housewives of Melbourne."

In December 2017, a proposal was presented to Newcastle councillors suggesting a 16% pay increase for councillors and a 24% rise in Nelmes' mayoral allowance, raising her overall pay from $102,610 to $125,500. This also included a councillor pay increase from $26,213 to $30,500. Subsequently, Newcastle's seven Labor councillors voted in a bloc to grant the pay rise. This decision was publicly debated and criticised by other councillors.

In November 2022, City of Newcastle called for tenders to lease its 5 suburban pools. This move was heavily criticised by members of the community including the Member for Wallsend, Sonia Hornery. Following this criticism, Nelmes and all Labor councillors recused themselves from a confidential debate on awarding a management contract for the pools, citing conflicts of interest due to alleged pressure from an unnamed senior politician. Consequently, Labor councillors voted to delegate responsibility of making pool tender decision to Jeremy Bath, the CEO of the City of Newcastle. The decision by the Labor councillors to abstain from voting drew heavy criticism from their counterparts, including Liberal councillor Katrina Wark. Wark expressed disappointment, stating, "The lord mayor and deputy lord mayor have chosen to engage in conflict with a respected local member over trivial internal disputes... It's regrettable that this situation is unfolding to the detriment of Newcastle ratepayers and pool users."

Nelmes was defeated by former Labor-turned independent candidate Ross Kerridge at the 2024 New South Wales local elections. Labor under Nelmes lost the Lord Mayoralty as well as their majority voting bloc in council at the election.

In 2025, Nelmes resigned from her position on the City of Newcastle Council, concluding more than 16 years in office. She was first elected as a Ward 3 Councillor in August 2008 and later served as Lord Mayor from November 2014 to October 2024.

=== Newcastle 500 ===
In 2016, a council led by Nelmes, alongside support from Destination NSW, endorsed a proposal for a 3-day motor racing event to take place in Newcastle. The inaugural 'Newcastle 500' event occurred in November 2017. However, the decision to host this event stirred significant backlash from local residents and businesses, sparking protests and rallies & even had one resident comparing herself to Jews in the Holocaust .

As the initial five-year contract neared its end in 2023, the City of Newcastle commissioned a survey, revealing that 59% of residents opposed extending the event for another five years. Consequently, the City of Newcastle opted not to discuss the race's continuation at the next council meeting, a move interpreted by racing media as a tactic by Nelmes to evade political backlash. The media also highlighted heightened political tensions in the region.

Subsequently, the NSW Labor state government criticised the City of Newcastle for failing to act on a vote regarding the race's future. NSW Premier Chris Minns also condemned the city's reluctance to consider a one-year deal, labelling it as 'nonsensical' and advising that they ‘get on’ with making a decision. On 19 October 2023, Nelmes confirmed that Supercars CEO Shane Howard had advised her that the Newcastle 500 would not proceed in 2024. Following this announcement criticism was directed at Nelmes over the delays from the City of Newcastle and the politicisation of the event.

== Personal life ==
Nelmes is married with three children and lives in Merewether.

Civic offices
Preceded by Jeff McCloy	Lord Mayor of Newcastle; 2014–2024	Succeeded by Ross Kerridge
