= List of mayors and lord mayors of Newcastle =

Lord Mayor of Newcastle
- Incumbent; Gavin Morris since 18 April 2026
- Style: The Right Worshipful the Lord Mayor of Newcastle
- Appointer: City of Newcastle
- Term length: One year (1859–1977) Four years (1978–date)
- Inaugural holder: Ald. James Hannell (Mayor); Ald. Harry Quinlan (Lord Mayor)
- Formation: 7 June 1859 (as Mayor); October 1948 (as Lord Mayor)
- Website: www.newcastle.nsw.gov.au

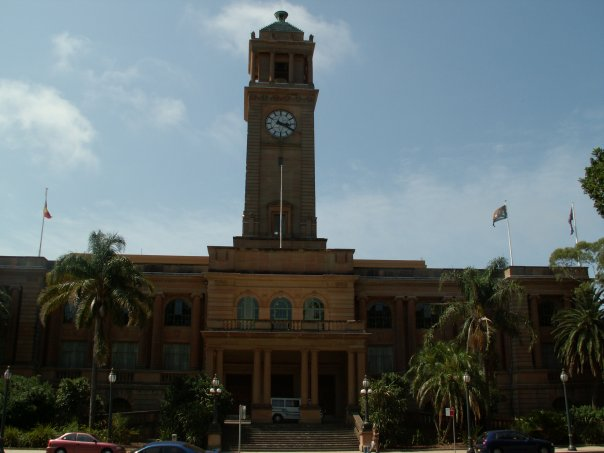
Newcastle City Hall, designed by acclaimed theatre architect Henry Eli White, has been the seat of the council since 1929.

This is a list of mayors and lord mayors of Newcastle and its predecessors, a local government area of New South Wales, Australia.

First incorporated on 7 June 1859 as the "Municipality of Newcastle", the council became known as "The Borough of Newcastle" on 23 December 1867 following the enactment of The Municipalities Act of 1867, and on 1 April 1938 the "City of Greater Newcastle" was proclaimed. In recognition of Newcastle's role as NSW's second oldest and largest city, the council applied to have the title "Lord Mayor", which was granted in October 1947 by King George VI and applied in October 1948. This made Newcastle the first Australian city that was not a capital to receive such an honour. On 1 April 1949 the official title of the council became the "City of Newcastle".

Ross Kerridge, who was elected to the lord mayoralty in 2024, resigned in February 2026 due to ill-health. At the subsequent by-election in April 2026, Independent Gavin Morris was elected to the position.

The official title of Lord Mayors while holding office is: The Right Worshipful Lord Mayor of Newcastle.

== Mayors (1859–1948) ==
| Years | Mayors |
|---|---|
| 1859–1862 | James Hannell |
| 1863–1864 | R. D. Bishop |
| 1865 | J. Ward |
| 1866 | Simon Kemp |
| 1867 | W. Brooks |
| 1868–1869 | James Hannell |
| 1870 | W. A. Spark |
| 1871 | James Hannell |
| 1872–1873 | Atkinson Tighe |
| 1874–1875 | E. A. White |
| 1876 | Francis Shaw |
| 1876 | David Ludlow |
| 1877–1879 | George Wallace |
| 1880 | Samuel Chapman |
| 1881 | Joseph Creer |
| 1882 | Thomas Brooks |
| 1883 | William Laing |
| 1884 | Stewart Keightley |
| 1885 | C. W. Morgan |
| 1886 | John Thorn |
| 1887 | George William Webb |
| 1888–1889 | Henry Buchanan |
| 1890 | Colin Christie |
| 1891 | William Thomas Gibb |
| 1892 | James Rogers |
| 1893 | Augustus Frederick Moore |
| 1894 | Alfred Asher |
| 1895 | William Sharp |
| 1896 | Thomas Smith |
| 1897 | David Miller |
| 1898 | William Kidd |
| 1899 | Alfred Timbury |
| 1900 | David Miller |
| 1901 | W. J. Ellis |
| 1902–1903 | William Cann |
| 1904 | John Gilbert |
| 1905 | Michael Moroney |
| 1906–1907 | Arthur James |
| 1908 | Andrew Cook |
| 1909–1910 | John Christian Reid |
| 1911–1913 | Hugh McLachlan Shedden |
| 1914 | John Christian Reid |
| 1915 | Robert George Kilgour |
| 1916–1917 | Michael Moroney |
| 1918–1919 | Robert George Kilgour |
| 1920 | Robert Gibson |
| 1921 | Robert George Kilgour |
| 1922–1923 | Henry Cornish |
| 1924 | Robert George Kilgour |
| 1925 | Morris Light |
| 1926 | Henry Cornish |
| 1927–1928 | Robert Gibson |
| 1929 | Harry Lambert Wheeler |
| 1930 | Thomas Blackall |
| 1931–1932 | Charles Parker |
| 1933 | William McGregor Shedden |
| 1934 | Robert George Kilgour |
| 1935 | Richard Christie |
| 1936–1937 | H. Fenton |
| 1938 | Arthur Griffiths |
| 1939 | George Jenner |
| 1940 | James Wiggins |
| 1941–1942 | Walter Young |
| 1943 | Ernest Dunkley (Ind) |
| 1944 – December 1946 | Roy Norris |
| December 1946 – October 1948 | Harry Quinlan |

== Lord mayors (1948–present) ==
| Image | Lord Mayor | Party | Term | Notes |
|---|---|---|---|---|
| | Harry Quinlan | Independent | October 1948 – December 1950 | |
| | Frank Purdue | Citizens Group | December 1950 – December 1951 | |
| | Tom Armstrong | Independent | December 1951 – December 1952 | |
| | Frank Purdue | Citizens Group | December 1952 – December 1955 | |
| | Douglas McDougall | Citizens Group | December 1955 – December 1956 | |
| | Charles Jones | Labor | December 1956 – December 1957 | |
| | Douglas McDougall | Citizens Group | December 1957 – December 1958 | |
| | Ernest Dunkle | Independent | December 1958 – December 1959 | |
| | Frank Purdue | Citizens Group | December 1959 – December 1965 | |
| | Douglas McDougall | Citizens Group | December 1965 – September 1973 | |
| | Gordon Anderson | Independent | September 1973 – September 1974 | |
| | Joy Cummings | Labor | September 1974 – September 1976 | |
| | Gordon Anderson | Independent | September 1976 – September 1977 | |
| | Joy Cummings | Labor | September 1977 – 16 April 1984 | |
| | Don Geddes | Citizens Group | 16 April 1984 – 2 October 1984 | Acting lord mayor |
| | Colin Saunders | N/A | 2 October 1984 – 1986 | Administrator |
| | John McNaughton | Labor | 1986 – September 1995 | |
| | Greg Heys | Labor | September 1995 – September 1999 | |
| | John Tate | Independent | 11 September 1999 – 8 September 2012 | |
| | Jeff McCloy | Independent | 8 September 2012 – 17 August 2014 | |
| | Brad Luke | Liberal | 17 August 2014 – 15 November 2014 | Acting lord mayor |
| | Nuatali Nelmes | Labor | 15 November 2014 – 14 September 2024 | |
| | Ross Kerridge | Independent | 14 September 2024 – 9 February 2026 | Elected under the campaign banner 'Our Newcastle' after losing Labor Party preselection. |
| | Charlotte McCabe | Greens | 27 October 2025 – 18 April 2026 | Acting lord mayor due to Dr Ross Kerridge's extended medical leave and subsequent resignation after returning from leave |
| | Gavin Morris | Independent | 18 April 2026 – Incumbent | Elected at a by-election in 2026. |

== Electoral results ==
=== 2026 by-election ===
At the election, first time candidate Gavin Morris secured 51.84 percent of the first preference votes and 67.69 percent of the two-candidate preferred vote count. Greens candidate Charlotte McCabe secured a 4.22 percent swing to her party and Labor's Declan Clausen had a significant primary vote drop of 15.57 percent, resulting in Labor being removed from the two-candidate preferred count and final result.

2026 Newcastle lord mayoral by-election
| Party | Candidate | Votes | % | ±% |
|---|---|---|---|---|
| Independent | Gavin Morris | 52,946 | 51.82 | +51.82 |
| Greens | Charlotte McCabe | 19,916 | 19.49 | +4.22 |
| Labor | Declan Clausen | 16,725 | 16.37 | −15.57 |
| Liberal | Jenny Barrie | 7,318 | 7.16 | −5.68 |
| Socialist Alliance | Stephen O’Brien | 3,025 | 2.96 | +0.36 |
| Independent | Milton Caine | 2,241 | 2.19 | −0.7 |
| Total formal votes | | 102,171 | 97.75 | +1.4 |
| Informal votes | | 2,349 | 2.25 | −1.4 |
Two-candidate-preferred result
| Independent | Gavin Morris | 60,169 | 67.69 | +67.69 |
| Greens | Charlotte McCabe | 28,718 | 32.31 | +32.31 |
| Independent hold | | Swing | | |

=== 2024 ===
2024 New South Wales mayoral elections: Newcastle
| Party | Candidate | Votes | % | ±% |
|---|---|---|---|---|
| Independent | Ross Kerridge | 35,350 | 34.47 | +34.47 |
| Labor | Nuatali Nelmes | 32,759 | 31.94 | –9.96 |
| Greens | Charlotte McCabe | 15,656 | 15.27 | +1.07 |
| Liberal | Callum Pull | 13,167 | 12.84 | +1.14 |
| Independent | Milton Caine | 2,965 | 2.89 | +2.89 |
| Socialist Alliance | Steve O'Brien | 2,662 | 2.60 | +0.7 |
| Total formal votes | | 102,559 | 96.35 | –0.96 |
| Informal votes | | 3,890 | 3.65 | +0.96 |
| Turnout | | 106,449 | 84.21 | +1.16 |
Two-candidate-preferred result
| Independent | Ross Kerridge | 42,169 | 51.68 | +51.68 |
| Labor | Nuatali Nelmes | 39,426 | 48.32 | –11.68 |
| Independent gain from Labor | | | | |

=== 2021 ===
2021 New South Wales mayoral elections: Newcastle
| Party | Candidate | Votes | % | ±% |
|---|---|---|---|---|
| Labor | Nuatali Nelmes | 42,052 | 41.9 | −0.6 |
| Newcastle Independents | John Church | 27,329 | 27.3 | +27.3 |
| Greens | John Mackenzie | 14,256 | 14.2 | +0.9 |
| Liberal | Jenny Barrie | 11,683 | 11.7 | −1.3 |
| Independent | Rod Holding | 3,015 | 3.0 | −1.5 |
| Socialist Alliance | Steve O'Brien | 1,940 | 1.9 | −0.2 |
| Total formal votes | | 100,275 | 97.3 | |
| Informal votes | | 2,768 | 2.7 | |
| Turnout | | 103,043 | 83.7 | |
Two-candidate-preferred result
| Labor | Nuatali Nelmes | 50,776 | 60.0 | |
| Newcastle Independents | John Church | 33,819 | 40.0 | |
| Labor hold | | Swing | N/A | |

=== 2017 ===
2017 New South Wales mayoral elections: Newcastle
| Party | Candidate | Votes | % | ±% |
|---|---|---|---|---|
| Labor | Nuatali Nelmes | 38,698 | 42.6 | +0.3 |
| Independent | Kath Elliott | 18,925 | 20.8 | +20.8 |
| Greens | Therese Doyle | 12,123 | 13.3 | −0.7 |
| Liberal | David Compton (disendorsed) | 11,770 | 12.9 | +12.9 |
| Independent | Rod Holding | 4,120 | 4.5 | +2.7 |
| Independent | Ron Brown | 3,354 | 3.7 | +3.7 |
| Socialist Alliance | Steve O'Brien | 1,909 | 2.1 | +2.1 |
| Total formal votes | | 90,899 | 95.2 | |
| Informal votes | | | 4.8 | |
| Turnout | | | 81.1 | |
Three-candidate-preferred result
| Labor | Nuatali Nelmes | 40,027 | 51.8 | +1.0 |
| Independent | Kath Elliott | 23,374 | 30.3 | +30.3 |
| Greens | Therese Doyle | 13,801 | 17.9 | +0.6 |
| Labor hold | | Swing | +1.0 | |

- Changes compared with 2014 Newcastle lord mayoral by-election

=== 2014 by-election ===
2014 Newcastle lord mayoral by-election
| Party | Candidate | Votes | % | ±% |
|---|---|---|---|---|
| Labor | Nuatali Nelmes | 35,198 | 42.30 | |
| Independent Liberal | Brad Luke | 19,635 | 23.60 | |
| Greens | Therese Doyle | 11,664 | 14.02 | |
| Independent | Aaron Buman | 9,570 | 11.50 | |
| Independent | David Chapman | 4,240 | 5.10 | |
| Independent | Rod Holding | 1,560 | 1.87 | |
| Australia First | Joe Ferguson | 1341 | 1.61 | |
| Total formal votes | | 83,208 | 94.27 | |
| Informal votes | | 5,051 | 5.73 | |
| Turnout | | 88,259 | 76.86 | |
Three-candidate-preferred result
| Labor | Nuatali Nelmes | 36,446 | 50.77 | |
| Independent Liberal | Brad Luke | 22,892 | 31.89 | |
| Greens | Therese Doyle | 12,451 | 17.34 | |
| Labor gain from Independent | | Swing | N/A | |

=== 2012 ===
2012 New South Wales mayoral elections: Newcastle
| Party | Candidate | Votes | % | ±% |
|---|---|---|---|---|
| Independent | Jeff McCloy | 36,663 | 43.1 | +43.1 |
| Labor | Nuatali Nelmes | 24,128 | 28.4 | +10.5 |
| Greens | John Sutton | 10,021 | 11.8 | −2.2 |
| Independent | Aaron Buman | 6,226 | 7.3 | −10.9 |
| Independent | Jacqueline Haines | 4,186 | 4.9 | +4.9 |
| Independent | Bryan Havenhand | 2,298 | 2.7 | +2.7 |
| Independent | Col Peebles | 1,497 | 1.8 | +1.8 |
| Total formal votes | | 85,019 | 94.7 | |
| Informal votes | | | 5.3 | |
| Turnout | | | 82.5 | |
Three-candidate-preferred result
| Independent | Jeff McCloy | 38,321 | 51.0 | +51.0 |
| Labor | Nuatali Nelmes | 26,009 | 34.6 | |
| Greens | John Sutton | 10,883 | 14.5 | |
| Independent gain from Independent | | Swing | N/A | |
