= National Party of Australia leadership elections =

The leader of the National Party of Australia (formerly the Australian Country Party and National Country Party) is elected by majority vote of the federal parliamentary party. A deputy leader is elected in the same fashion. The party's longest-serving leader is Earle Page, who held the office from 1921 to 1939. The party's current leader is David Littleproud, who has held this office since 2022. It is historically rare for the incumbent leader and deputy leader to be opposed in a bid for re-election.

From the 1940s onwards when an incumbent leader retired they were usually succeeded by their deputy. With the exception of the election of Ian Sinclair in 1984, every one of these deputy leaders ascended to the leadership unopposed. This trend was broken in 2026 when then deputy leader Kevin Hogan failed to succeed David Littleproud as leader upon Littleproud's retirement from the position.

== 1920s ==
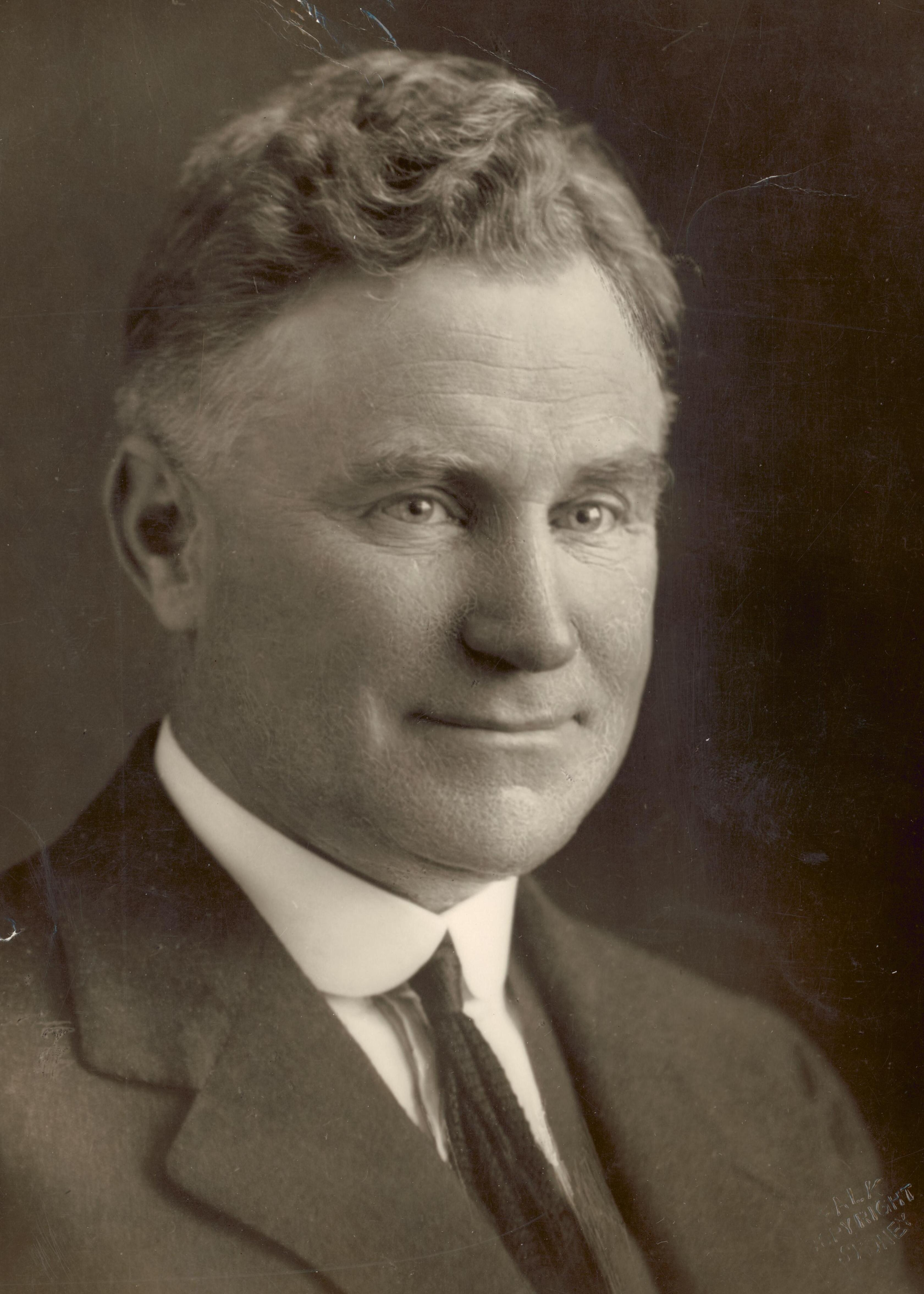
Earle Page (party leader 1921–1939)

- 1920: A vote for the leadership and deputy leadership was held on 25 February 1920, prior to the opening of parliament the following day. William McWilliams was elected party leader and Edmund Jowett was elected deputy leader. Both elections were unopposed, with eleven members voting.
- 1921: A vote for the leadership and deputy leadership was held on 5 April 1921. Earle Page replaced William McWilliams as leader. Edmund Jowett did not re-contest the deputy leadership and was replaced by Henry Gregory.
- 1922: A vote for the deputy leadership was held on 27 June 1922. William Fleming was elected deputy leader in place of Henry Gregory, who had resigned in February 1922 over policy differences.
- 1923: A vote for the leadership and deputy leadership was held on 16 January 1923, following the 1922 federal election. Earle Page was re-elected unopposed as leader. William Gibson was elected unopposed as deputy leader, following William Fleming's defeat at the election.
- 1926: A vote for the leadership and deputy leadership was held on 12 January 1926, following the 1925 federal election. Earle Page was re-elected unopposed as leader and William Gibson was re-elected unopposed as deputy leader.
- 1929: A vote for the leadership and deputy leadership was held on 19 November 1929, following the 1929 federal election. Earle Page was re-elected unopposed as leader. Thomas Paterson was elected as deputy leader, following William Gibson's defeat at the election.

== 1930s ==
- 1932: A vote for the leadership and deputy leadership was held on 17 February 1932, following the 1931 federal election. Earle Page was re-elected as leader and Thomas Paterson was re-elected as deputy leader.
- 1932: A vote for the leadership was held on 12 October 1932. Earle Page resigned the leadership to seek a vote of confidence, following criticism of his handling of negotiations to form a coalition with the United Australia Party. There was no opponent to his re-election, however Senator Charles Hardy dissented from the motion.
- 1934: A vote for the leadership and deputy leadership was held on 22 October 1934, following the 1934 federal election. Earle Page was re-elected unopposed as leader and Thomas Paterson was re-elected as deputy leader.
- 1937: A vote for the leadership and deputy leadership was held on 27 November 1937, following the 1937 federal election. Earle Page was re-elected unopposed as leader. Harold Thorby was elected as deputy leader following Thomas Paterson's retirement. The vote for the deputy leadership was controversial. An initial ballot was held using preferential voting, with Thorby, John McEwen, Archie Cameron, and Horace Nock as candidates. McEwen defeated Thorby by one vote following the elimination of Cameron and Nock, but there was confusion as to whether preferences had been distributed correctly. As a result, a second ballot was held in which Thorby defeated McEwen by one vote. It was reported that Larry Anthony, a newly elected MP, had abstained from voting in the first ballot due to his unfamiliarity with the candidates, but was prevailed upon to vote for Thorby in the second.
- 1939: A vote for the leadership was held on 13 September 1939, following Earle Page's resignation. Archie Cameron was elected leader, defeating John McEwen by seven votes to five. Before the vote, four breakaway members of the party – Oliver Badman, Thomas Collins, Bernard Corser, and Arthur Fadden – were excluded from the meeting. Earlier in the year they had left the parliamentary party in protest at Page's leadership. It was reported that the four MPs were all supporters of McEwen, and the outcome of the leadership vote would have been reversed if they had been allowed to vote.

== 1950s ==
- 1950: A vote for the leadership and deputy leadership was held on 21 February 1950, following the 1949 federal election. Arthur Fadden was re-elected unopposed as leader and John McEwen was re-elected unopposed as deputy leader.
- 1951: A vote for the leadership and deputy leadership was held on 11 June 1951, following the 1951 federal election. Arthur Fadden was re-elected unopposed as leader and John McEwen was re-elected unopposed as deputy leader.
- 1954: A vote for the leadership and deputy leadership was held on 7 July 1954, following the 1954 federal election. Arthur Fadden was re-elected unopposed as leader and John McEwen was re-elected unopposed as deputy leader.
- 1956: A vote for the leadership and deputy leadership was held on 6 January 1956, following the 1955 federal election. Arthur Fadden was re-elected unopposed as leader and John McEwen was re-elected unopposed as deputy leader.

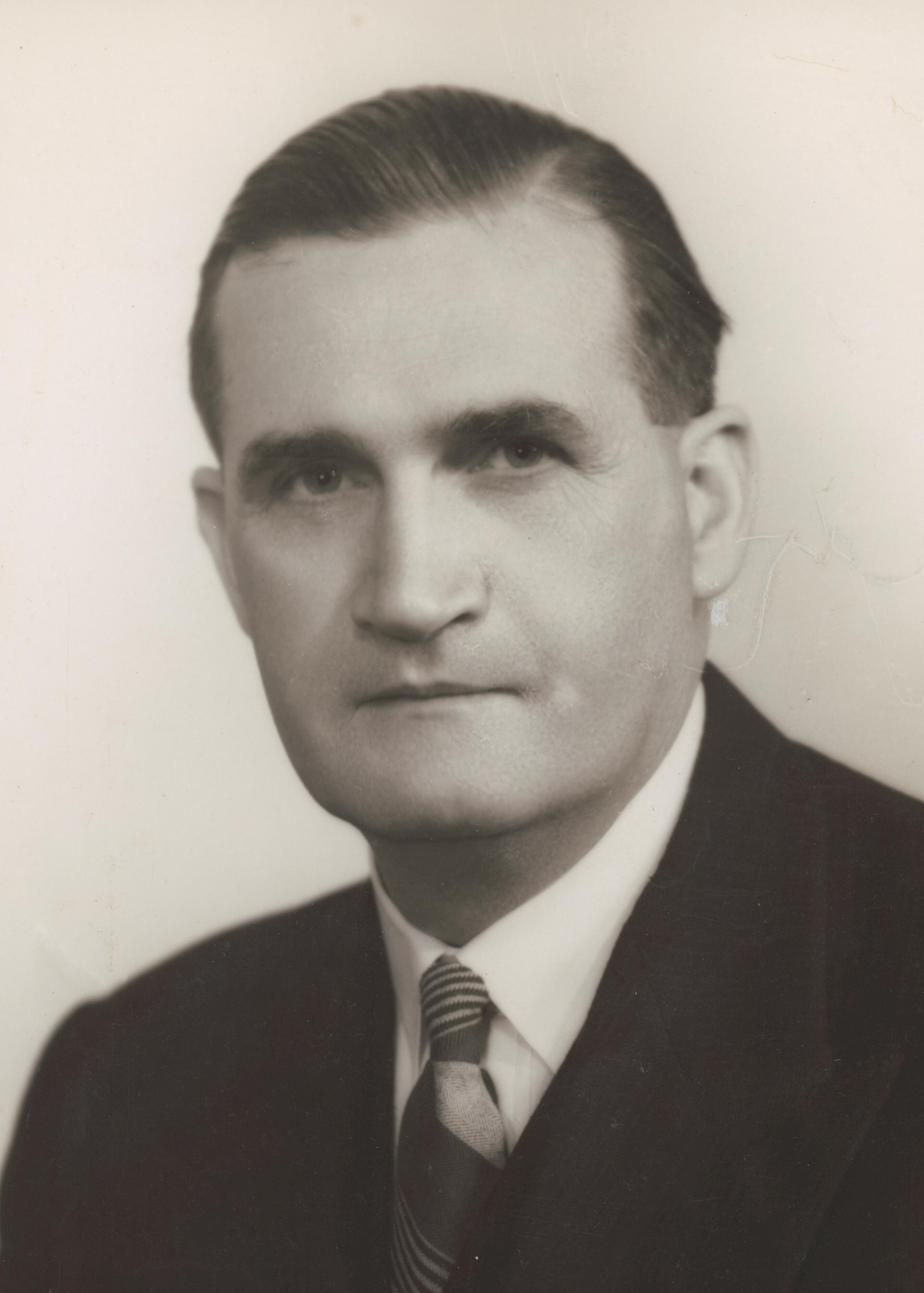
John McEwen (party leader 1958–1971)

- 1958: A vote for the leadership and deputy leadership was held on 26 March 1958, following Arthur Fadden's retirement. John McEwen was elected unopposed as leader. Charles Davidson was elected unopposed as deputy leader in place of McEwen.
- 1958: A vote for the leadership and deputy leadership was held in December 1958, following the 1958 federal election. John McEwen was re-elected as leader and Charles Davidson was re-elected as deputy leader.

== 1960s ==
- 1961: A vote for the leadership and deputy leadership was held on 19 December 1961, following the 1961 federal election. John McEwen was re-elected unopposed as leader and Charles Davidson was re-elected unopposed as deputy leader. The votes were held at a joint meeting of the coalition parties, which also saw Robert Menzies and Harold Holt re-elected unopposed to the equivalent positions in the Liberal Party.
- 1963: A vote for the leadership and deputy leadership was held on 11 December 1963, following the 1963 federal election. John McEwen was re-elected unopposed as leader. Charles Adermann defeated Hugh Roberton and Senator Harrie Wade for the deputy leadership, following the retirement of Charles Davidson.
- 1966: A vote for the leadership and deputy leadership was held on 8 December 1966, following the 1966 federal election. John McEwen was re-elected unopposed as leader. Doug Anthony defeated Ian Sinclair for the deputy leadership, following the retirement of Charles Adermann.
- 1969: A vote for the leadership and deputy leadership was held on 10 November 1969, following the 1969 federal election. John McEwen was re-elected unopposed as leader and Doug Anthony was re-elected unopposed as deputy leader.

== 1970s ==
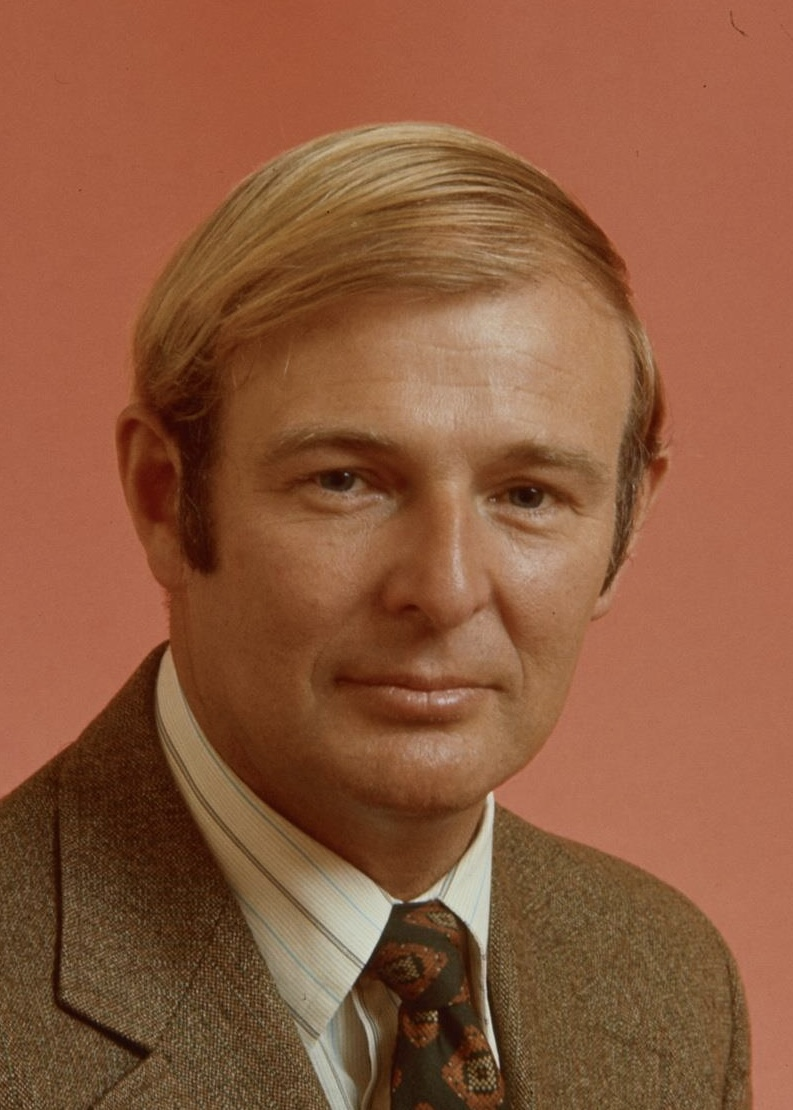
Doug Anthony (party leader 1971–1984)

- 1971: A vote for the leadership and deputy leadership was held on 2 February 1971, following John McEwen's retirement. Doug Anthony was elected unopposed as leader. Ian Sinclair was elected deputy leader in place of Anthony, defeating Peter Nixon by a close margin; the result was "not generally expected".
- 1972: A vote for the leadership and deputy leadership was held on 13 December 1972, following the 1972 federal election. Doug Anthony was re-elected unopposed as leader and Ian Sinclair was re-elected unopposed as deputy leader.
- 1974: A vote for the leadership and deputy leadership was held on 4 June 1974, following the 1974 election. Doug Anthony was re-elected as leader and Ian Sinclair was re-elected as deputy leader.

== 1980s ==
=== 1984 ===
A vote for the leadership and deputy leadership was held on 17 January 1984, following Doug Anthony's retirement. Ian Sinclair was elected as leader, defeating Stephen Lusher by an unspecified margin. Ralph Hunt was elected as deputy in place of Sinclair, defeating Lusher, Ray Braithwaite, Tom McVeigh, and Ian Robinson.

1984 National Party of Australia leadership election
- 17 January 1984
- Leadership election
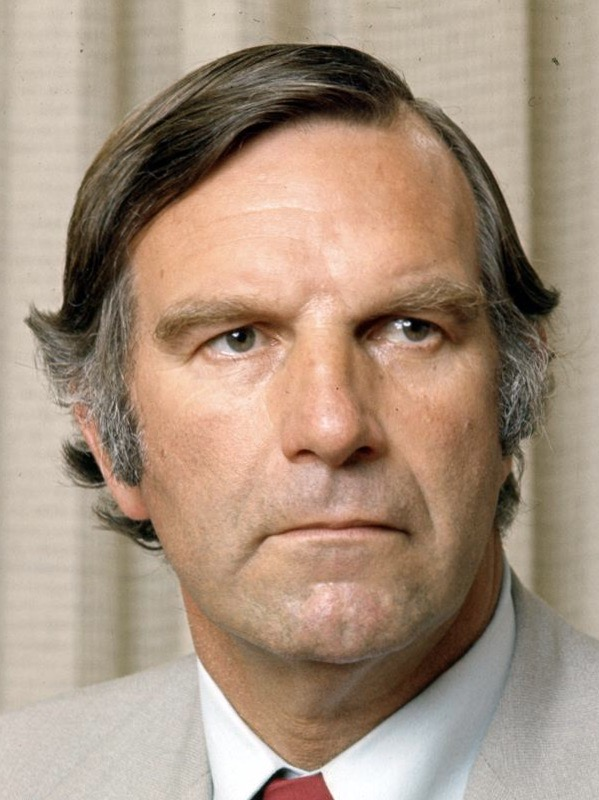

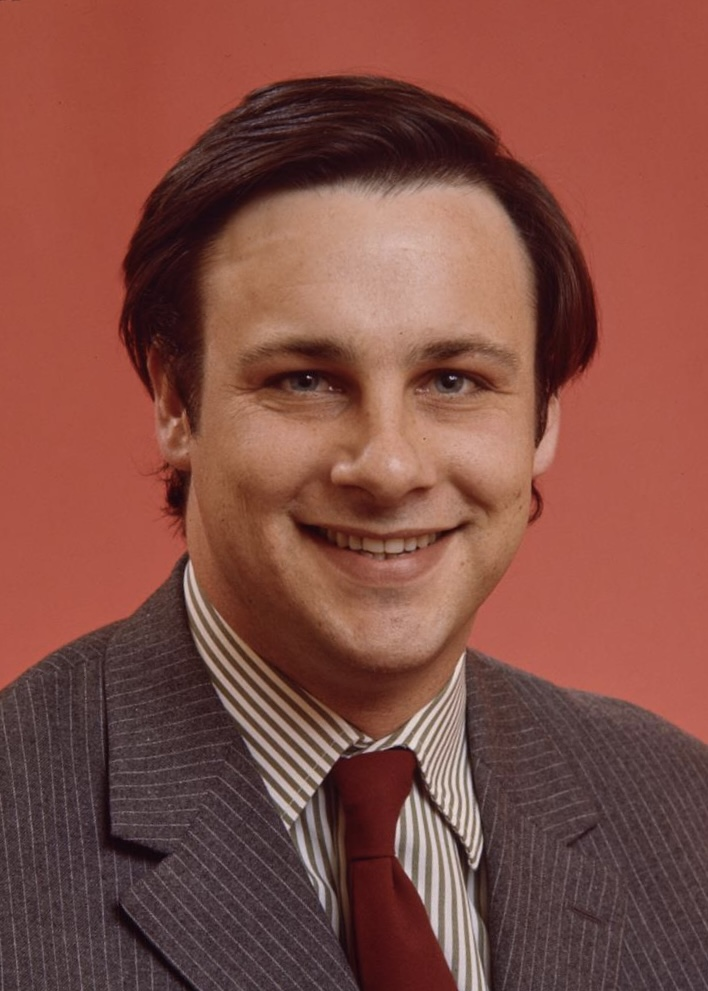
Nominee	Ian Sinclair	Stephen Lusher
Caucus vote	Majority	Minority
Seat	New England (NSW)	Hume (NSW)
Leader before election
Doug Anthony
Elected Leader
Ian Sinclair
- Deputy leadership election
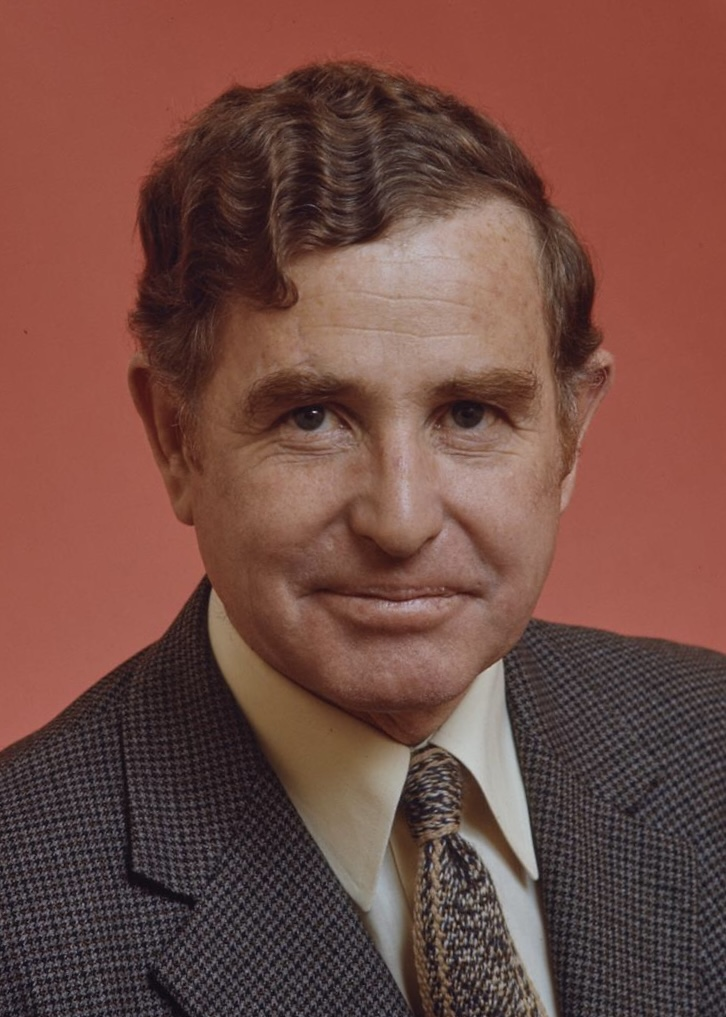

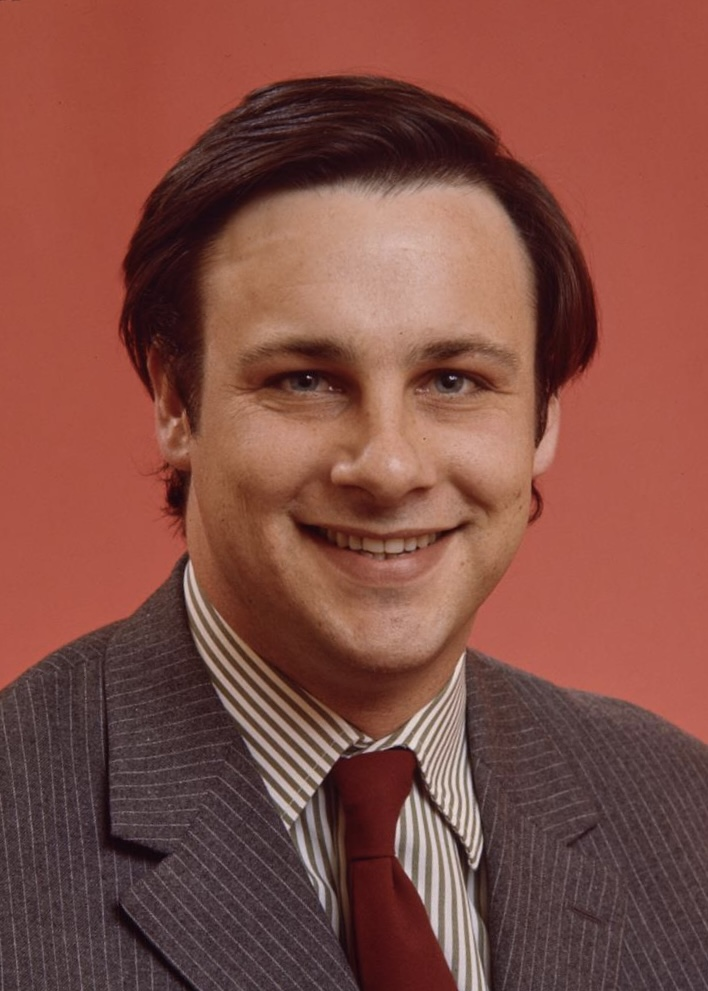

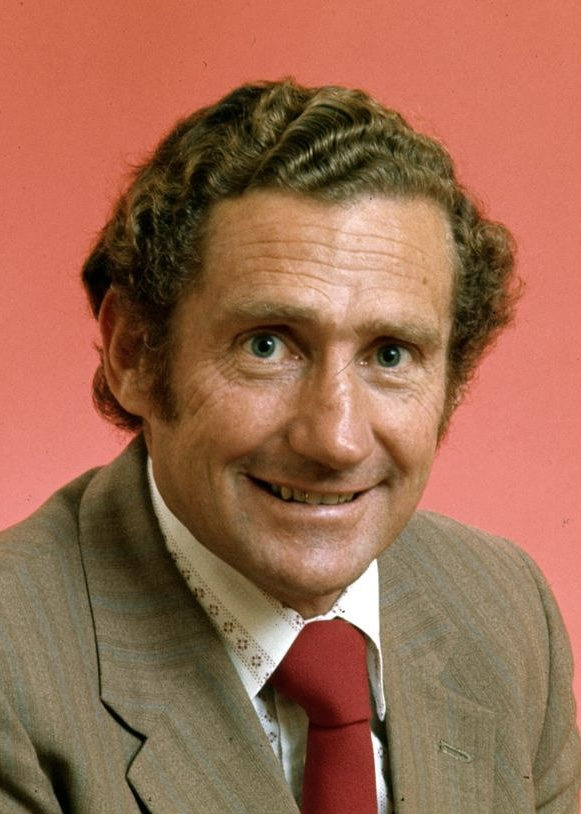

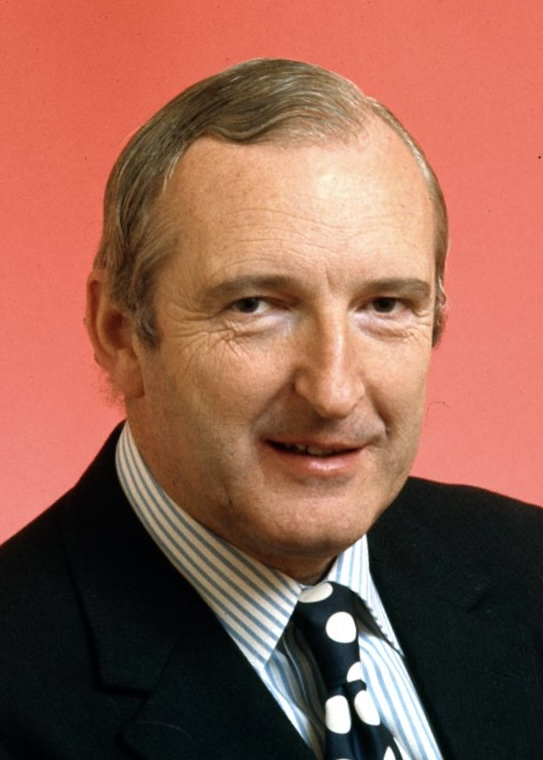
			NAT
Nominee	Ralph Hunt	Stephen Lusher	Ray Braithwaite
Caucus vote	Majority	Minority	Minority
Seat	Gwydir (NSW)	Hume (NSW)	Dawson (QLD)
Nominee	Tom McVeigh	Ian Robinson
Caucus vote	Minority	Minority
Seat	Darling Downs (QLD)	Cowper (NSW)
Deputy Leader before election
Ian Sinclair
Elected Deputy Leader
Ralph Hunt

=== 1987 ===
A vote for the leadership and deputy leadership was held on 23 July 1987, following the Coalition's defeat at the 1987 federal election. Ian Sinclair was re-elected as party leader, defeating a challenge from Ray Braithwaite; he "won comfortably" with a vote of 20-6. Bruce Lloyd was elected deputy leader in place of Ralph Hunt, who did not re-contest the position. Lloyd defeated seven other candidates – Charles Blunt, Ian Cameron, Tim Fischer, Noel Hicks, Peter McGauran, Ian Robinson, and John Stone.

1987 National Party of Australia leadership spill
- 23 July 1987
- Leadership election
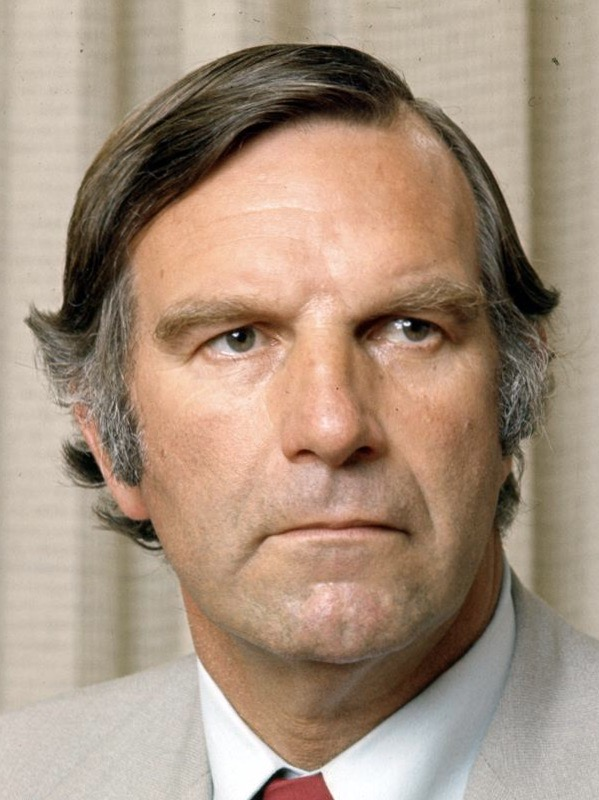
		NAT
Nominee	Ian Sinclair	Ray Braithwaite
Caucus vote	20	6
Percentage	76.92%	23.07%
Seat	New England (NSW)	Dawson (QLD)
Leader before election
Ian Sinclair
Elected Leader
Ian Sinclair
- Deputy leadership election
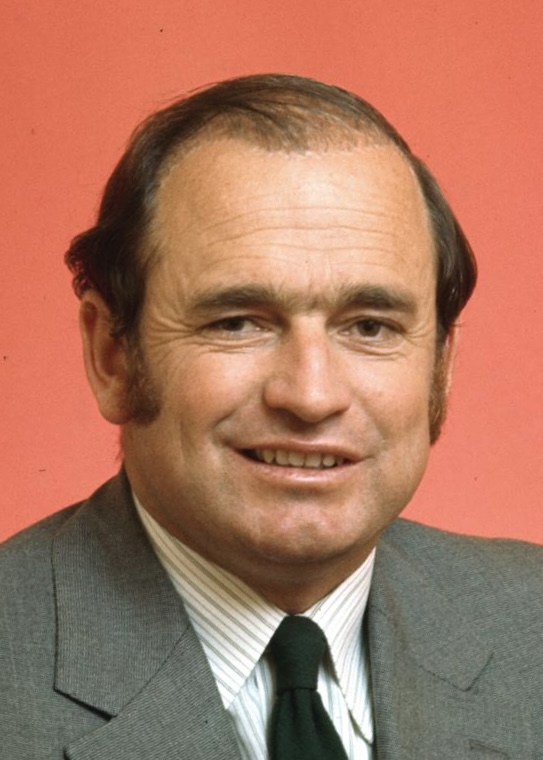

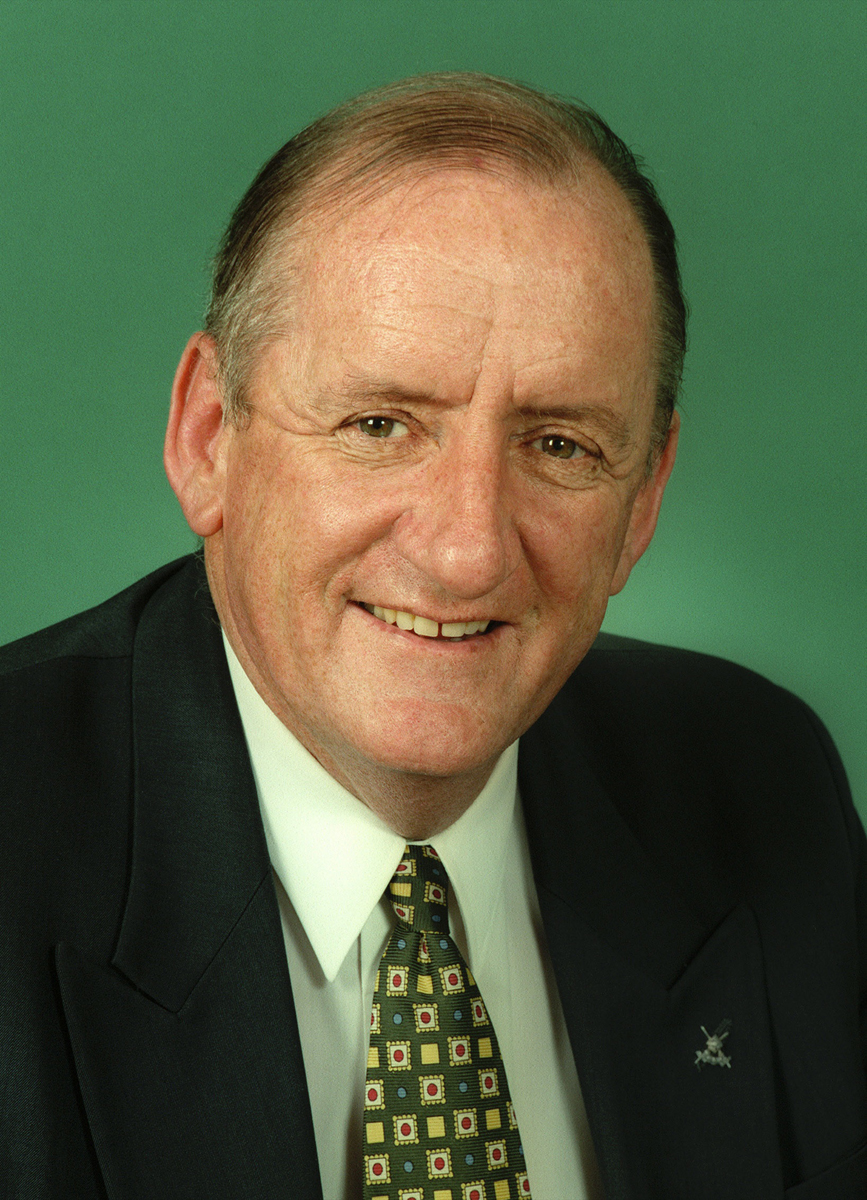

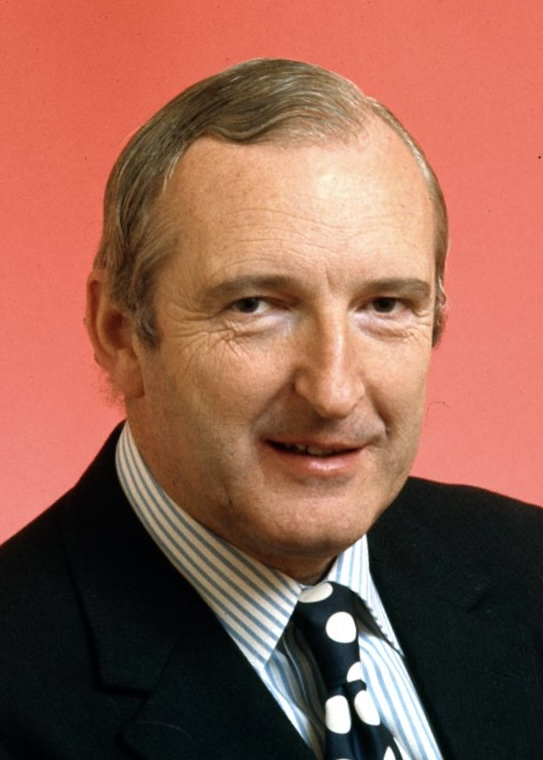
		NAT	NAT
Nominee	Bruce Lloyd	Charles Blunt	Ian Cameron
Caucus vote	Majority	Minority	Minority
Seat	Murray (NSW)	Richmond (NSW)	Maranoa (QLD)
		NAT	NAT
Nominee	Tim Fischer	Noel Hicks	Peter McGauran
Caucus vote	Minority	Minority	Minority
Seat	Farrer (NSW)	Riverina-Darling (NSW)	Gippsland (VIC)
		NAT
Nominee	Ian Robinson	John Stone
Caucus vote	Minority	Minority
Seat	Page (NSW)	Senator for Queensland
Deputy Leader before election
Ralph Hunt
Elected Deputy Leader
Bruce Lloyd

=== 1989 ===
A vote for the leadership was held on 10 May 1989. Charles Blunt was elected leader in place of Ian Sinclair. The Liberal Party simultaneously voted to replace its leader John Howard with Andrew Peacock.

1989 National Party of Australia leadership spill
- 10 May 1989
	NAT
Nominee	Charles Blunt
Caucus vote	Unopposed
Seat	Richmond (NSW)
Leader before election
Ian Sinclair
Elected Leader
Charles Blunt

== 1990s ==
=== 1990 ===
A vote for the leadership and deputy leadership was held on 10 April 1990, due to the defeat of Charles Blunt at the 1990 federal election.

Tim Fischer was elected party leader ahead of four other candidates – John Sharp, Peter McGauran, Garry Nehl, and former leader Ian Sinclair. The results were not formally released, but The Canberra Times reported that Fischer defeated Sharp by 12 votes to 8 on the final ballot, with McGauran the last to be eliminated. Bruce Lloyd was re-elected deputy leader, defeating a challenge from Noel Hicks.

1990 National Party of Australia leadership election
- 10 April 1990
- Leadership election
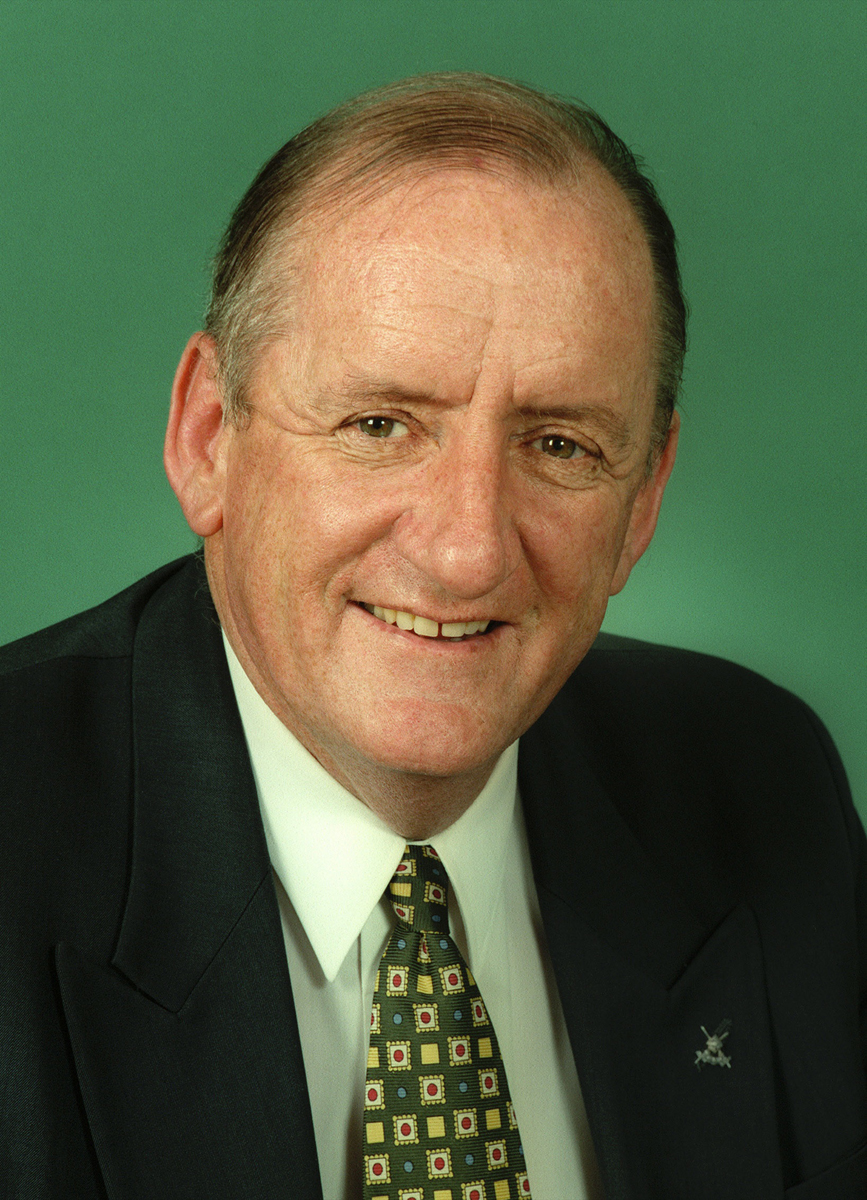

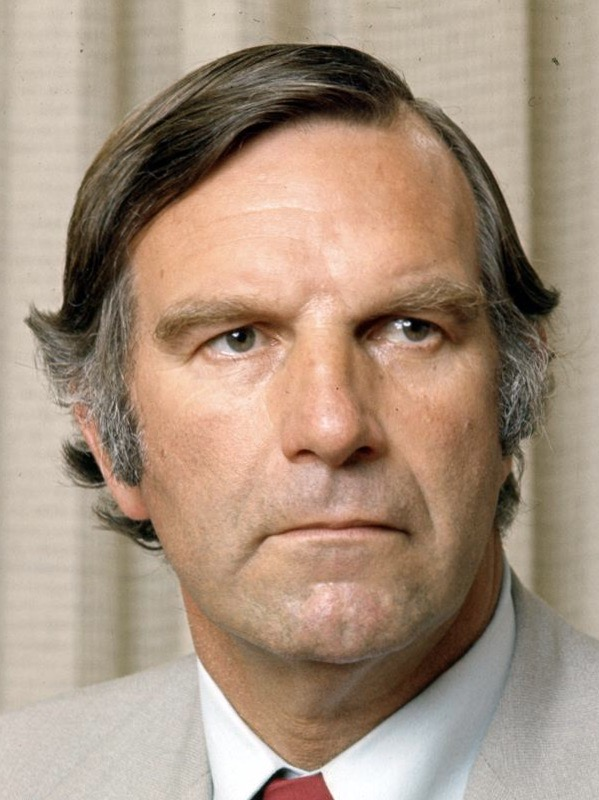
		NAT	NAT
Nominee	Tim Fischer	John Sharp	Peter McGauran
Caucus vote	12	8	Eliminated
Percentage	60.0%	40.0%	Eliminated
Seat	Farrer (NSW)	Gilmore (NSW)	Gippsland (VIC)
	NAT
Nominee	Garry Nehl	Ian Sinclair
Caucus vote	Eliminated	Eliminated
Percentage	Eliminated	Eliminated
Seat	Cowper (NSW)	New England (NSW)
Leader before election
Charles Blunt
Elected Leader
Tim Fischer
- Deputy leadership election
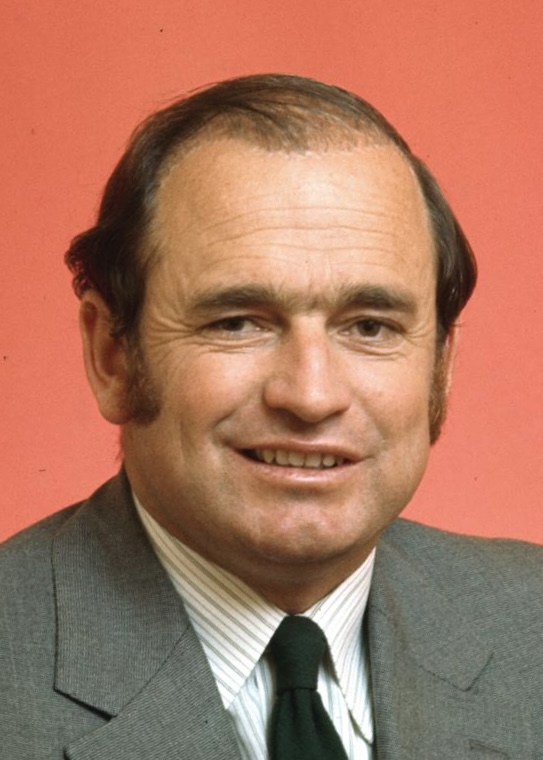
		NAT
Nominee	Bruce Lloyd	Noel Hicks
Caucus vote	>10	<10
Seat	Murray (NSW)	Riverina-Darling (NSW)
Deputy Leader before election
Bruce Lloyd
Elected Deputy Leader
Bruce Lloyd

=== 1993 ===
A vote for the leadership and deputy leadership was held on 24 March 1993.

Tim Fischer defeated Ian Sinclair to retain the leadership of the party. The margin of the vote was not released and different sources reported different figures.

John Anderson was elected deputy leader ahead of five other candidates, including shadow ministers Peter McGauran, John Sharp, and Bruce Scott.

1993 National Party of Australia leadership election
- 24 March 1993
- Leadership election
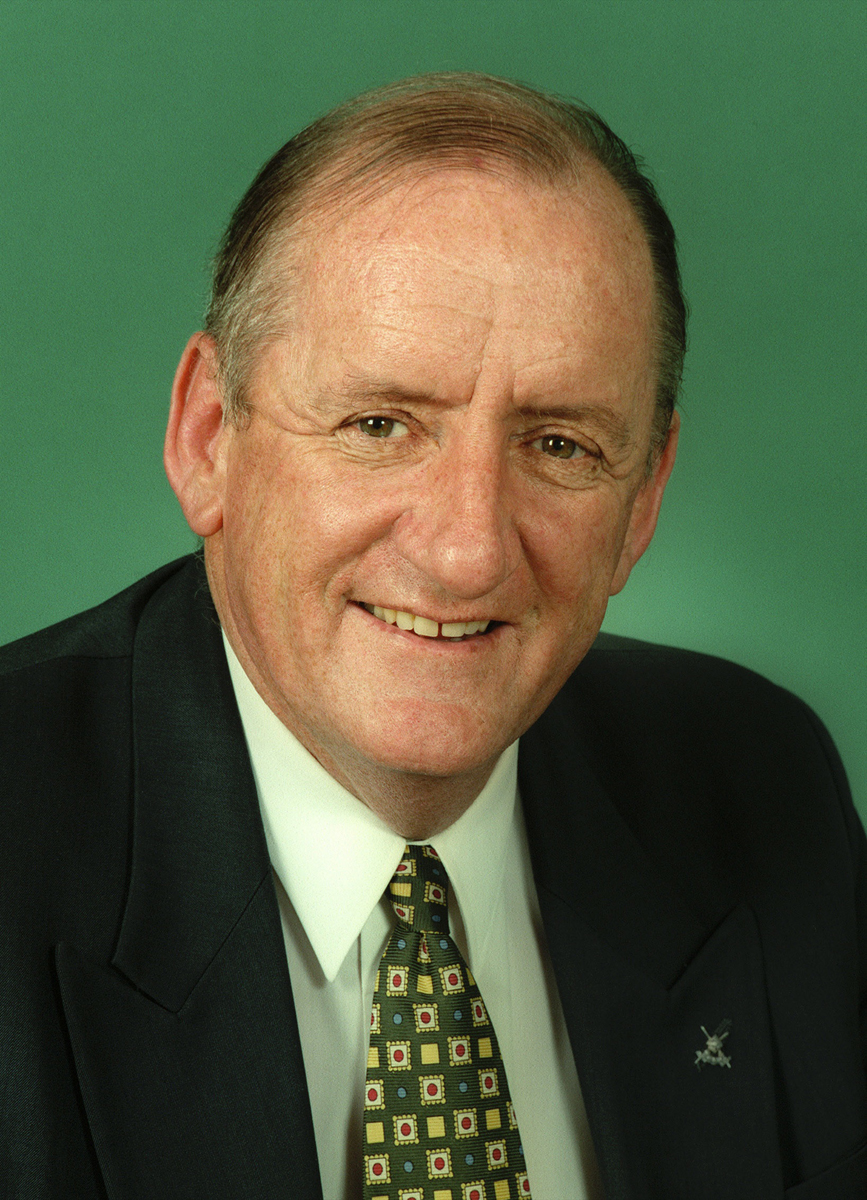

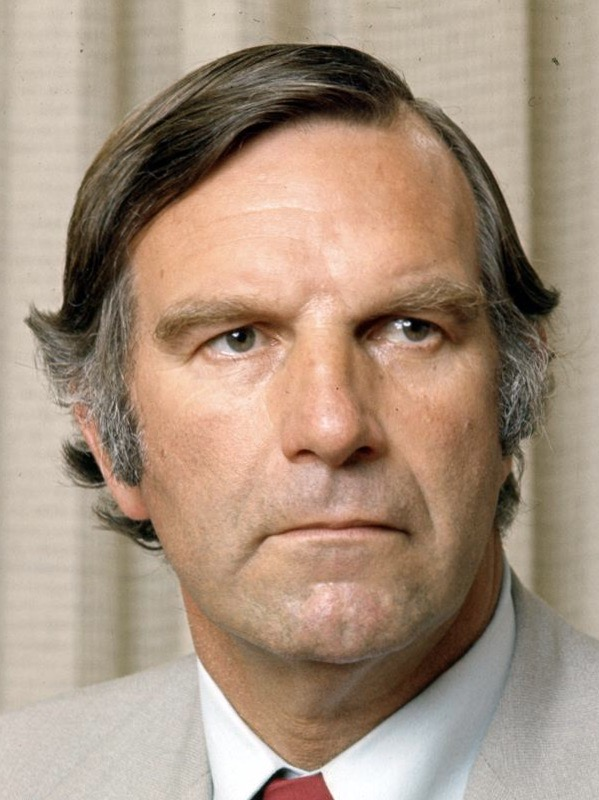
Nominee	Tim Fischer	Ian Sinclair
Caucus vote	Majority	Minority
Seat	Farrer (NSW)	New England (NSW)
Leader before election
Tim Fischer
Elected Leader
Tim Fischer
- Deputy leadership election
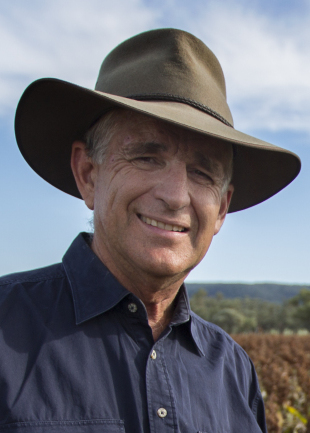

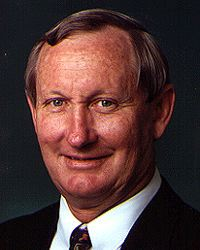
		NAT
Nominee	John Anderson	Peter McGauran
Caucus vote	Majority	Minority
Seat	Gwydir (NSW)	Gippsland (VIC)
	NAT
Nominee	John Sharp	Bruce Scott
Caucus vote	Minority	Minority
Seat	Hume (NSW)	Maranoa (QLD)
Deputy Leader before election
Bruce Lloyd
Elected Deputy Leader
John Anderson

=== 1999 ===
A vote for the leadership and deputy leadership was held on 1 July 1999, following the resignation of Tim Fischer.

John Anderson was elected leader unopposed, with Mark Vaile elected as his deputy.

1999 National Party of Australia leadership election
- 1 July 1999
- Leadership election
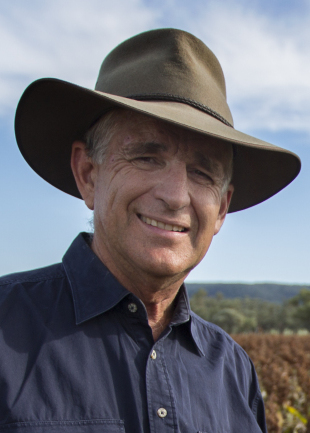
Nominee	John Anderson
Caucus vote	Unopposed
Seat	Gwydir (NSW)
Leader before election
Tim Fischer
Elected Leader
John Anderson
- Deputy leadership election
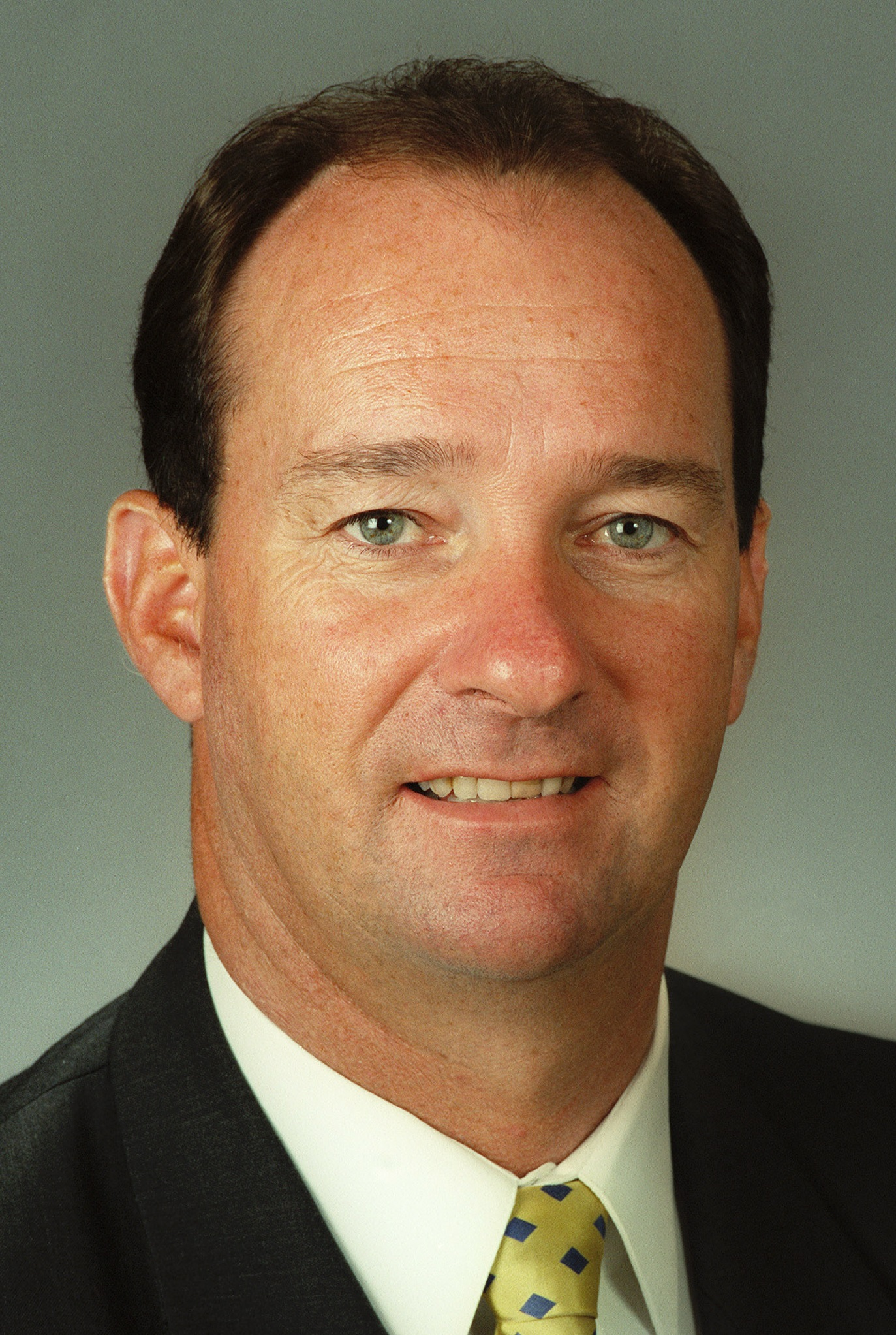
Nominee	Mark Vaile
Caucus vote	Unopposed
Seat	Lyne (NSW)
Deputy Leader before election
John Anderson
Elected Deputy Leader
Mark Vaile

== 2000s ==
=== 2005 ===
A vote for the leadership and deputy leadership was held on 23 June 2005, following John Anderson's retirement announcement. Mark Vaile was elected unopposed as the new leader, while Warren Truss was elected deputy leader ahead of four other candidates – Peter McGauran, John Cobb, Ian Causley, and De-Anne Kelly. Anderson's resignation as party leader did not take effect until 6 July 2005.

2005 National Party of Australia leadership election
- 23 June 2005
- Leadership election
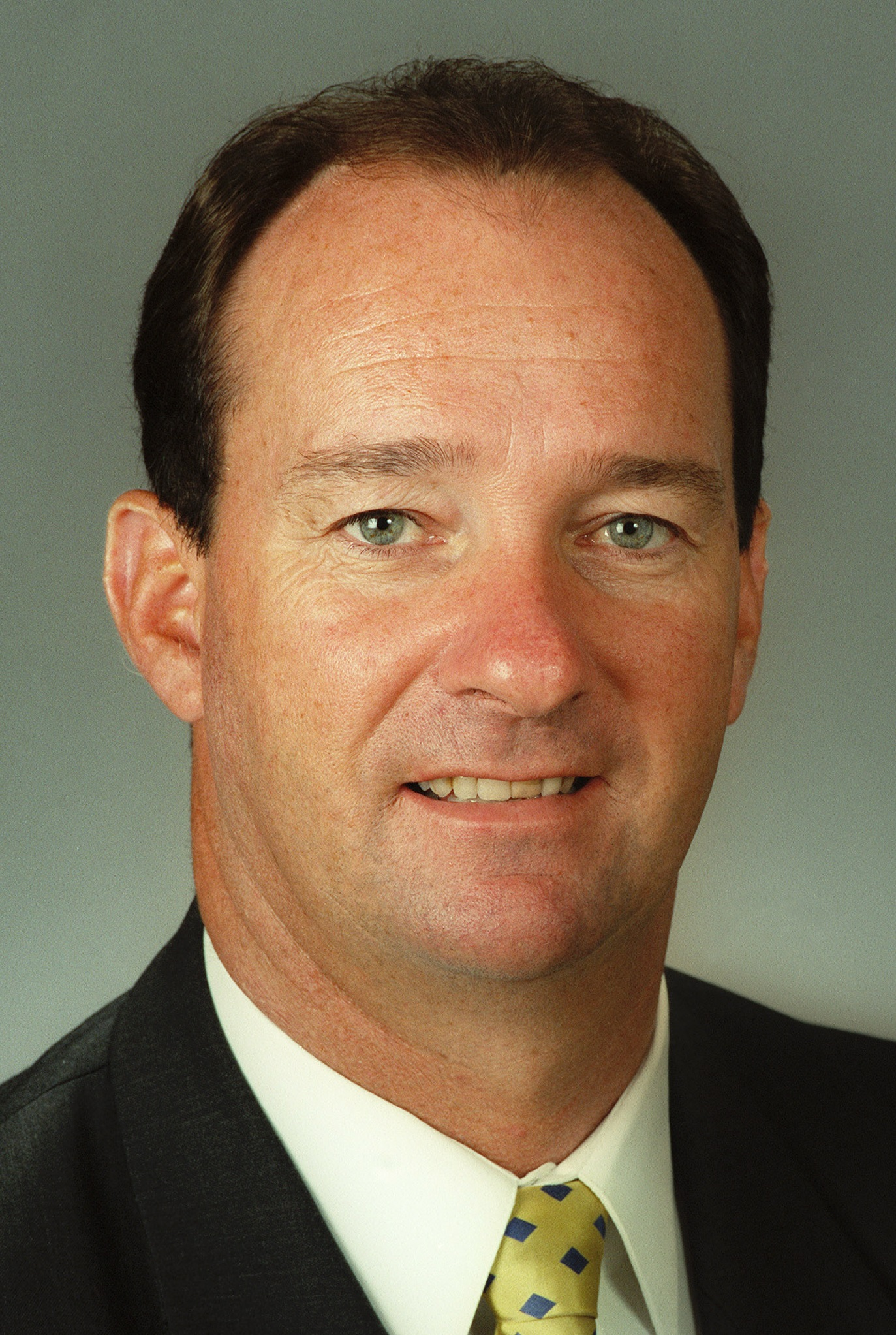
Nominee	Mark Vaile
Caucus vote	Unopposed
Seat	Lyne (NSW)
Leader before election
John Anderson
Elected Leader
Mark Vaile
- Deputy leadership election
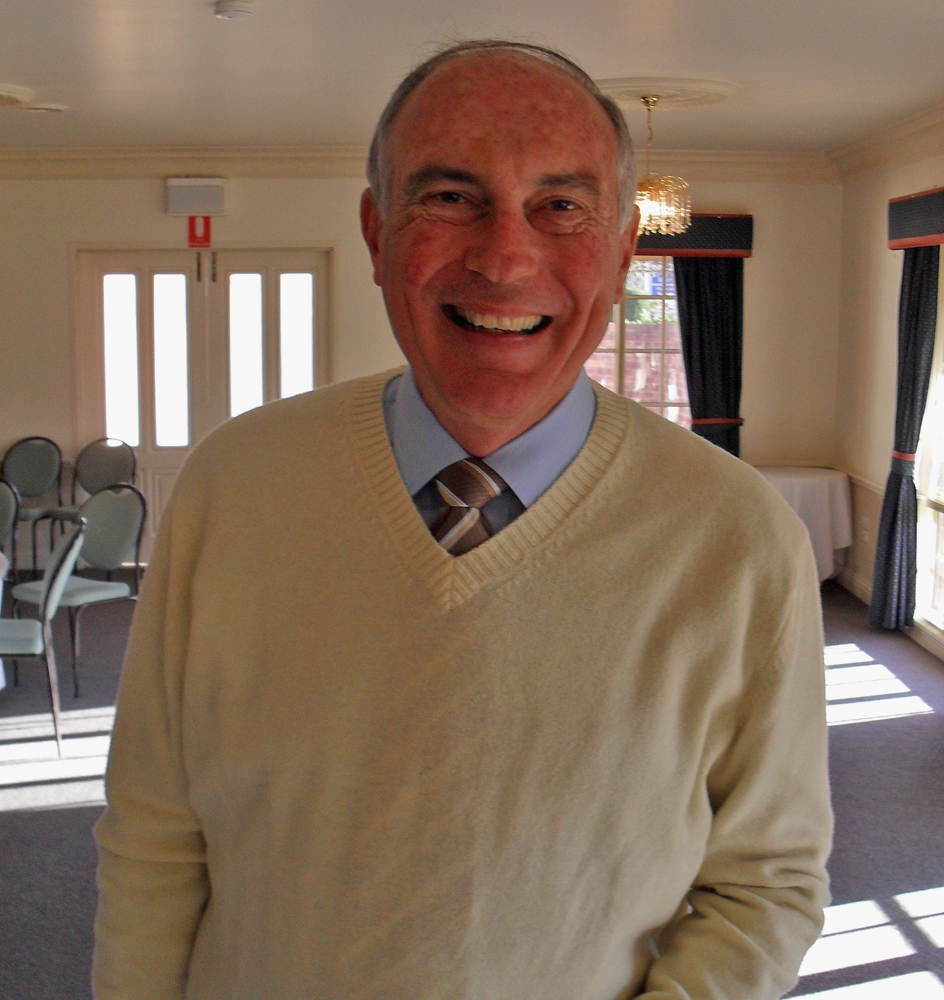

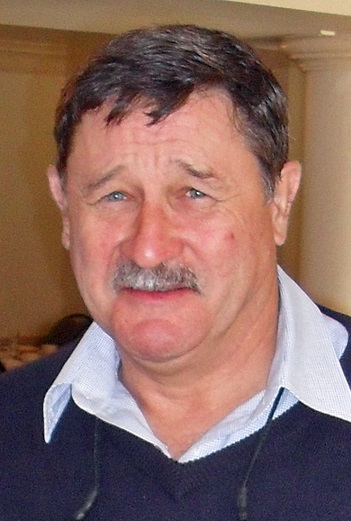

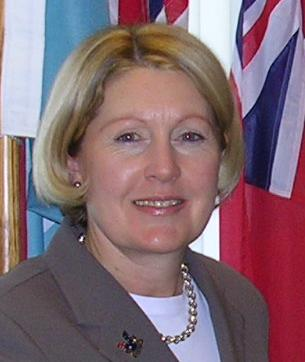
		NAT
Nominee	Warren Truss	Peter McGauran	John Cobb
Caucus vote	Majority	Minority	Minority
Seat	Wide Bay (QLD)	Gippsland (VIC)	Parkes (NSW)
	NAT
Nominee	Ian Causley	De-Anne Kelly
Caucus vote	Minority	Minority
Seat	Page (NSW)	Dawson (QLD)
Deputy Leader before election
Barnaby Joyce
Elected Deputy Leader
Fiona Nash

=== 2007 ===
A vote for the leadership and deputy leadership was held on 3 December 2007, following Mark Vaile's resignation and the Liberal-National coalition's defeat at the 2007 federal election. Warren Truss was the only announced candidate and had Vaile's support.

At the party meeting, Truss was elected as leader unanimously and Country Liberal Party senator Nigel Scullion was elected as his deputy.

2007 National Party of Australia leadership election
- 3 December 2007
- Leadership election
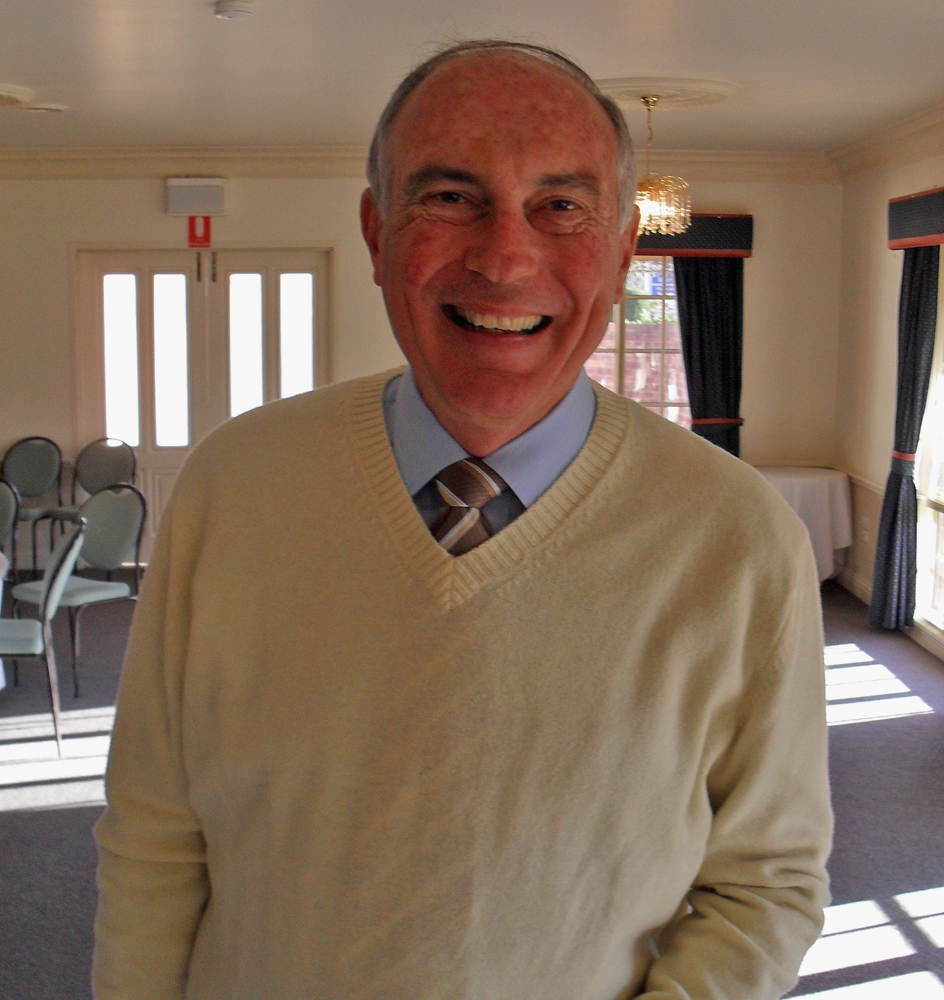
Nominee	Warren Truss
Caucus vote	Unopposed
Seat	Wide Bay (QLD)
Leader before election
Mark Vaile
Elected Leader
Warren Truss
- Deputy leadership election
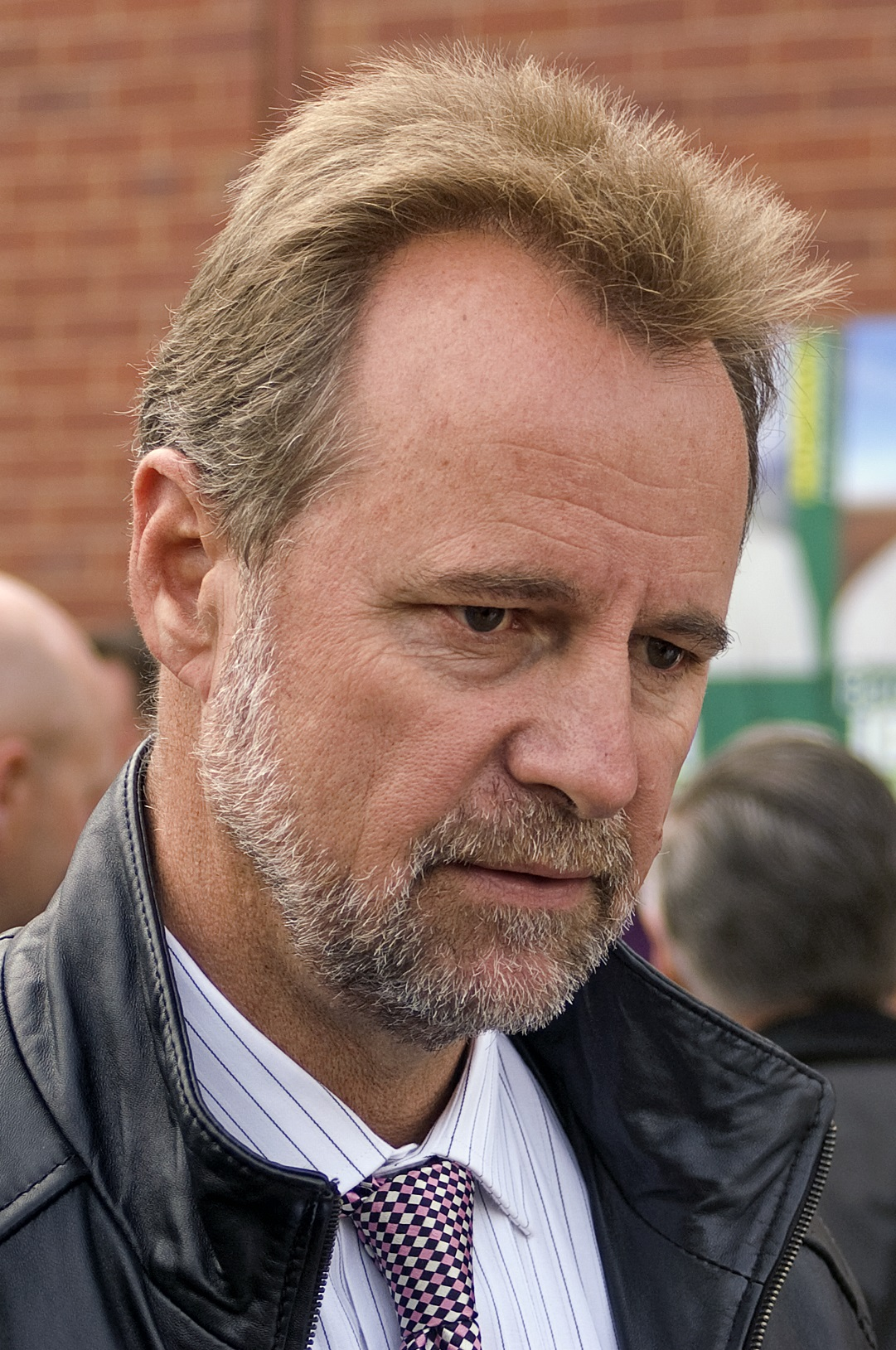
Nominee	Nigel Scullion
Caucus vote	Unopposed
Seat	Senator for the NT
Deputy Leader before election
Warren Truss
Elected Deputy Leader
Nigel Scullion

== 2010s ==
=== 2016 ===
On 11 February 2016, National Party leader, Warren Truss announced his intention to retire at the 2016 federal election would immediately stand aside as Leader of The Nationals.

Truss's deputy Barnaby Joyce, was elected unopposed as Truss' replacement, with Fiona Nash as his deputy. Consequently, Joyce was then sworn in as Deputy Prime Minister of Australia on 18 February 2016.

2016 National Party of Australia leadership election
- 11 February 2016
- Leadership election
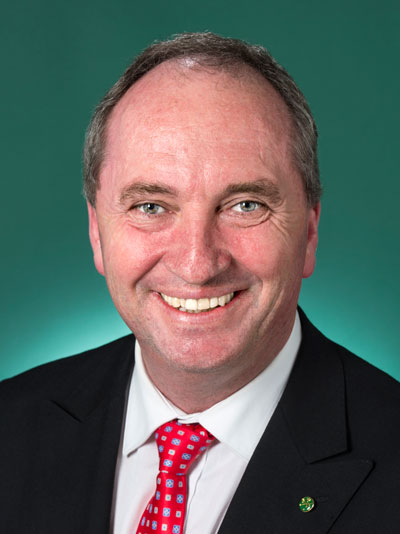
Nominee	Barnaby Joyce
Caucus vote	Unopposed
Seat	New England (NSW)
Leader before election
Warren Truss
Elected Leader
Barnaby Joyce
- Deputy leadership election
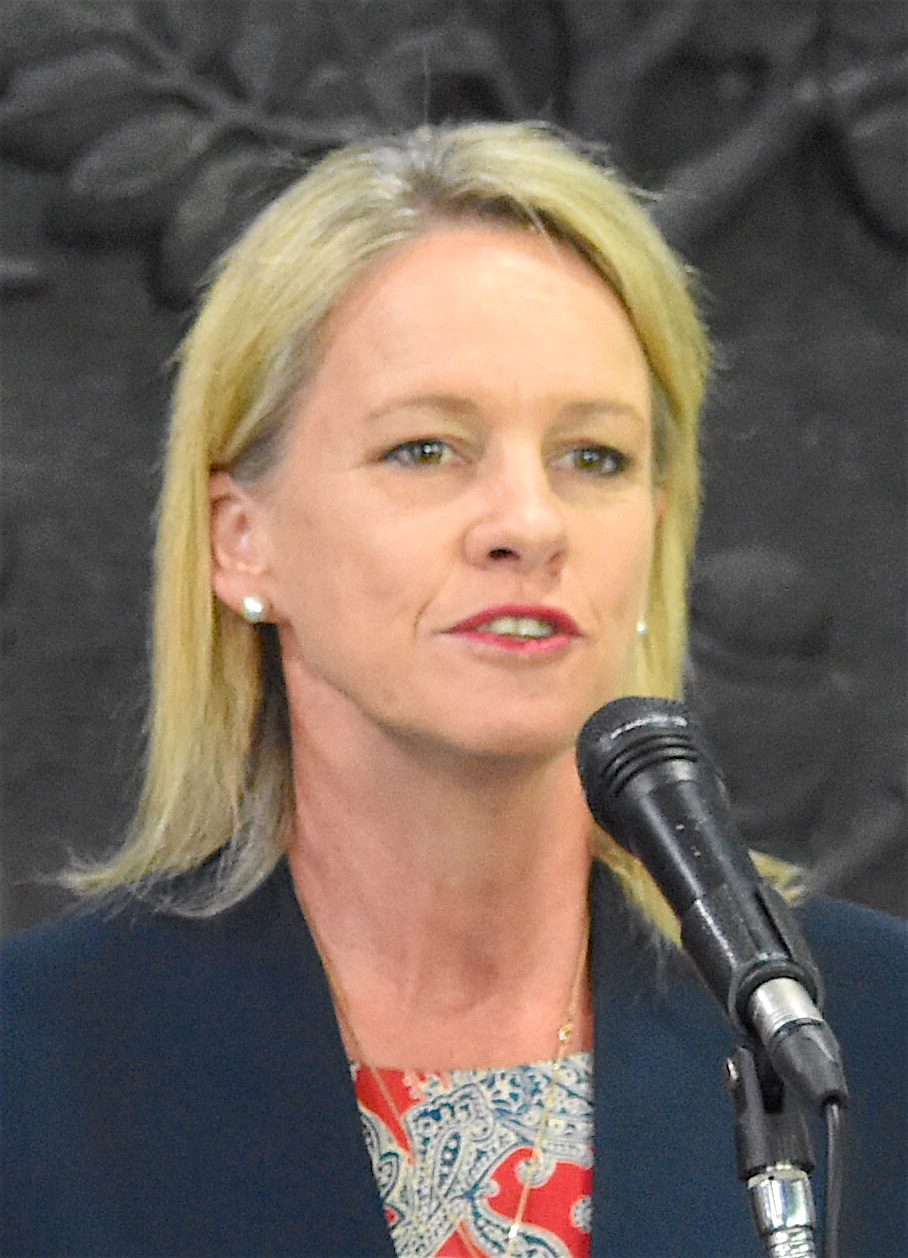
Nominee	Fiona Nash
Caucus vote	Unopposed
Seat	Senator for NSW
Deputy Leader before election
Barnaby Joyce
Elected Deputy Leader
Fiona Nash

=== 2018 ===
On 26 February 2018, the Nationals held a party room meeting at which Barnaby Joyce formally resigned to the backbench. Michael McCormack was seen as the favourite to become leader, and was the only declared candidate as at 25 February. At the meeting he secured the support of a majority of the 21 National Party parliamentarians, seeing off a last-minute challenge from Queensland MP George Christensen.
