= Results of the 2021 New South Wales local elections in Murray and Far West =

This is a list of results for the 2021 New South Wales local elections in the Murray region, including the Far West.

== Albury ==
2021 Albury City Council election
← 2016	4 December 2021	2024 →

All 9 seats on Albury City Council 5 seats needed for a majority
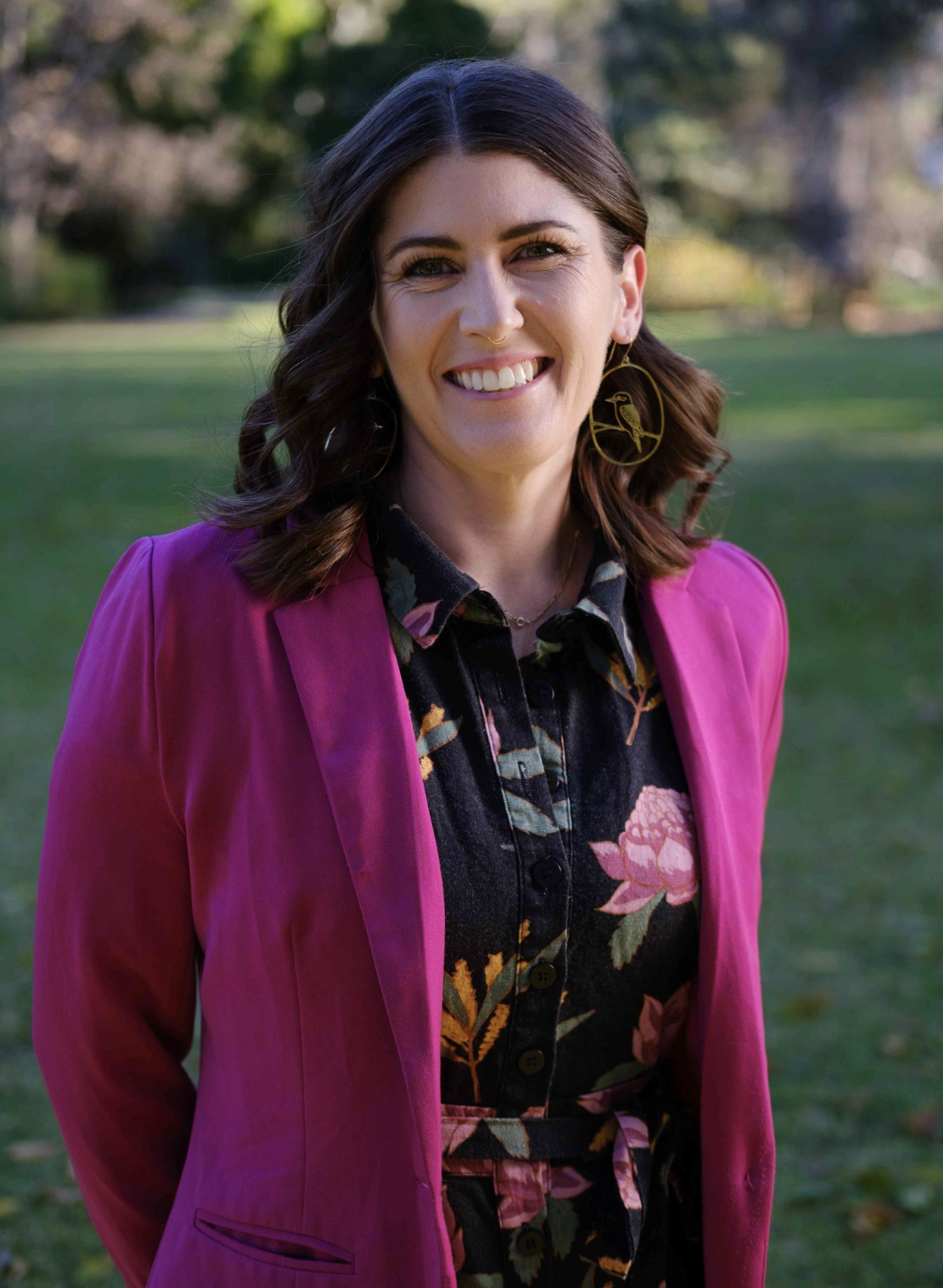

	First party	Second party	Third party
	IND
Leader	N/A	Ashley Edwards	Darren Cameron
Party	Independents (Note: Including local groups (not to be confused with locally-registered political parties).)	Greens	Labor
Last election	7 seats	1 seat	1 seat
Seats before	7	1	1
Seats won	7	1	1
Seat change	Steady	Steady	Steady
First preference vote	22,586	3,074	2,714
Percentage	79.7%	10.8%	9.5%
Swing	▲3.1	▼1.4	▼0.5
Largest party before election
Independents
Subsequent largest party
Independents

Albury City Council is composed of composed of nine councillors elected proportionally to a single ward. At the 2016 election, independents and local groups won 76.61% of the vote.

The Albury Citizens and Ratepayers Movement, which had 1.20% of the vote in 2016 and previously had an elected councillor, disbanded in 2019.

Greens councillor Amanda Cohn did not seek re-election but remained on the party's ticket for the election.

=== Albury results ===
2021 New South Wales local elections: Albury
Party	Candidate	Votes	%	±%
Team Kylie	1. Kylie King (elected); 2. Steve Bowen (elected); 3. Rhiannon Veness; 4. Aimee Chan; 5. Taneesha Smith	6,426	22.6	+22.6
Stuart Baker Team	1. Stuart Baker (elected); 2. Jessica Kellahan (elected); 3. Stephen Mamouney; 4. Danielle Cale; 5. Louise Pemberton	4,863	17.1	+17.1
Alice Glachan Ticket	1. Alice Glachan (Ind. Lib) (elected); 2. Lindsay Pearson; 3. Graham Docksey; 4. Naziya Singh; 5. Jackie Dunn	3,959	14.0	−4.2
Greens	1. Ashley Edwards (elected); 2. Kofi Isaacs; 3. Jill Pattinson; 4. Susie Monte; 5. Amanda Cohn	3,074	10.8	−1.4
Labor	1. Darren Cameron (elected); 2. Marcus Rowland; 3. Amelia Cameron; 4. Geoffrey Allen; 5. Christopher Ryan	2,714	9.5	−0.5
Independent	1. Daryl Betteridge (elected); 2. Barbara Hull; 3. Jodie Tiernan; 4. Brian Grenfell; 5. Mathew Tratz	2,661	9.4	+9.4
Hamilton Team	1. Ross Hamilton; 2. Dianne Thomas; 3. Emily Grellman; 4. Lucie Wallis; 5. Claire Hamilton	1,324	4.7	+4.7
Albury First	1. Henk Van de Ven; 2. Garry Pearce; 3. Paul Armstrong; 4. Bill Van Noordennen; 5. Christopher Martin	1,294	4.6	−8.3
Thurley	1. David Thurley (elected); 2. Mark Doyle; 3. Esther Heather; 4. John Moore; 5. Michael Machin	1,244	4.4	−4.3
Independent	1. Andrew Barber; 2. Sarah Watkins; 3. Trevor Barber; 4. C. Star; 5. Diane Harnett	768	2.7	+2.7
Independent	Peter Hood	51	0.2	+0.2
Total formal votes		28,374	94.2	+0.7
Informal votes		1,745	5.8	−0.7
Turnout		30,119	80.0	

== Berrigan ==
2021 New South Wales local elections: Berrigan
Party	Candidate	Votes	%	±%
Independent	Matthew Hannan (elected)	833	17.6	
Independent	Carly Marriott (elected)	654	13.9	
Independent	Sarah McNaught (elected)	610	12.9	
Independent	Edward (Ted) Hatty (elected)	488	10.3	
Independent	John Taylor (elected)	347	7.4	
Independent	Roger Reynoldson (elected)	313	6.6	
Independent	Julia Cornwell McKean (elected)	302	6.4	
Independent	Renee Paine (elected)	271	5.7	
Independent	Marcus Fry	195	4.1	
Independent	Mandy Bonat	185	3.9	
Independent	Clare Allan	182	3.9	
Independent	Daryll Morris	172	3.6	
Independent	Ross Bodey	168	3.6	
Total formal votes		4,720	95.0	
Informal votes		249	5.0	
Turnout		4,969	80.5	

== Broken Hill ==
2021 Broken Hill City Council election
← 2016	4 December 2021	2024 →

All 10 seats on Broken Hill City Council 6 seats needed for a majority
- Registered: 13,055
- Mayor
- Turnout: 83.1%
	First party	Second party	Third party
	BBH		TBH
Candidate	Tom Kennedy	Darriea Turley	Dave Gallagher
Party	Better Broken Hill	Labor	Team Broken Hill
Primary vote	5,868	2,533	2,411
Percentage	54.3%	23.4%	22.3%
Swing	▲30.1	▼5.8	▼6.3
TCP	80.29%	19.71%
Mayor before election
Tom Kennedy
For A Better Broken Hill
Elected Mayor
Tom Kennedy
For A Better Broken Hill
- Councillors
- Turnout: 83.4%
Party	Leader	Vote %	Seats	+/–
For A Better Broken Hill	Tom Kennedy	50.4	5	+5
Team Broken Hill	Dave Gallagher	24.5	2	0
Labor	Darriea Turley	21.8	2	−2
This lists parties that won seats. See the complete results below.

Broken Hill City Council is composed of nine councillors elected proportionally to a single ward, as well as a directly-elected mayor. At the 2016 election, Labor won a plurality with four councillors, along with Darriea Turley elected mayor.

Independent councillor Tom Kennedy formed the "For A Better Broken Hill" (FABBH) group for the election, while another independent councillor − Ron Page − joined Dave Gallagher's "Team Broken Hill" group.

The Greens, which had 4.97% of the vote in 2016, did not recontest. However, Ghislaine 'Gigi' Barbe, who ran fourth on the Greens ticket in 2016, ran as an independent.

FABBH won a majority in a landslide victory, electing all six of its candidates, including Kennedy being elected mayor.

=== Broken Hill mayor ===
2021 New South Wales mayoral elections: Broken Hill
Party	Candidate	Votes	%	±%
For A Better Broken Hill	Tom Kennedy	5,868	54.3	+30.1
Labor	Darriea Turley	2,533	23.4	−5.8
Team Broken Hill	Dave Gallagher	2,411	22.3	−6.3
Total formal votes		10,812	97.5	
Informal votes		272	2.5	
Turnout		11,084	83.1	
For A Better Broken Hill gain from Labor		Swing	N/A	

=== Broken Hill results ===
2021 New South Wales local elections: Broken Hill
Party	Candidate	Votes	%	±%
For A Better Broken Hill	1. Tom Kennedy; 2. Michael Boland (elected); 3. Bob Algate (elected); 4. Jim Hickey (elected); 5. Hayley Jewitt (elected); 6. Alan Chandler (elected)	5,237	50.4	+50.4
Team Broken Hill	1. Dave Gallagher (elected); 2. Ron Page (elected); 3. Dinny Reardon; 4. Patrick Reincke; 5. Matthew McCarthy	2,549	24.5	−1.8
Labor	1. Darriea Turley (elected); 2. Marion Browne (elected); 3. Branko Licul; 4. Ashley Byrne; 5. Blake Egdecombe; 6. Nathan Fell	2,263	21.8	−16.9
Independent	Gigi Barbe	346	3.3	+3.3
Total formal votes		10,395	93.4	
Informal votes		732	6.6	
Turnout		11,127	83.4	

== Edward River ==
2021 New South Wales local elections: Edward River
Party	Candidate	Votes	%	±%
Independent	Pat Fogarty (elected)	997	21.9	
Independent	Paul Fellows (elected)	783	17.2	
Independent National	Peta Betts (elected)	705	15.5	
Independent Liberal	Shirlee Burge (elected)	463	10.2	
Independent	Linda Fawns (elected)	398	8.7	
Independent	Harold Clapham (elected)	358	7.9	
Independent	Peter Connell (elected)	276	6.1	
Independent	Tarria Moore (elected)	211	4.6	
Independent	Marc Petersen (elected)	183	4.0	
Independent	Shannon Sampson	138	3.0	
Independent	Narelle Whitham	47	1.0	
Total formal votes		4,559	94.9	
Informal votes		245	5.1	
Turnout		4,804	75.8	

== Federation ==
Elected councillor	Party
Patrick Bourke	Independent (Group A)
David Fahey	Independent (Group A)
Andrew Kennedy	Independent (Group C)
Aaron Nicholls	Independent (Group E)
Shaun Whitechurch	Independent (Group D)
Sally Hughes	Independent (Group B)
David Longley	Independent
Rowena Black	Independent
Gail Law	Independent

2021 New South Wales local elections: Federation
Party	Candidate	Votes	%	±%
Independent (Group A)		1,616	21.8	
Independent (Group C)		1,117	15.1	
Independent (Group E)		932	12.6	
Independent	David Longley	873	11.8	
Independent (Group D)		785	10.6	
Independent (Group B)		699	9.4	
Independent	Rowena Black	497	6.7	
Independent	Gail Law	280	3.8	
Independent	David Harrison	251	3.4	
Independent	Janette Outram	249	3.4	
Independent	Mick Robson	103	1.4	
Total formal votes		7,402	94.0	
Informal votes		1,780	6.0	
Turnout		7,877	79.6	

== Greater Hume ==
2021 New South Wales local elections: Greater Hume
Party	Votes	%	Swing	Seats	Change
Independent	4,037	100.0		9	Steady
Formal votes	4,037	95.60			
Informal votes	186	4.40			
Total	4,223	100.00		9	

=== East ===
2021 New South Wales local elections: East Ward
Party	Candidate	Votes	%	±%
Independent	Lea Parker (elected)	unopposed		
Independent	Tony Quinn (elected)	unopposed		
Independent	Heather Wilton (elected)	unopposed		
Registered electors		2,554		

=== North ===
2021 New South Wales local elections: North Ward
Party	Candidate	Votes	%	±%
Independent	Doug Meyer (elected)	707	34.5	
Independent	Annette Schilg (elected)	601	29.3	
Independent	Ian Forrest (elected)	389	19.0	
Independent	Karen Schoff	351	17.1	
Total formal votes		2,048	96.1	
Informal votes		84	3.9	
Turnout		2,132	78.4	

=== West ===
2021 New South Wales local elections: West Ward
Party	Candidate	Votes	%	±%
Independent	Jenny O'Neill (elected)	633	31.8	
Independent	Ashley Linder (elected)	542	27.2	
Independent	Matt Hicks (elected)	375	18.9	
Independent	Jonathon Howard	198	10.0	
Independent	Bradley Hore	135	6.8	
Independent	Barbara Chenoweth	106	5.3	
Total formal votes		1,989	95.1	
Informal votes		102	4.9	
Turnout		2,091	84.9	

== Murray River ==
Murray River Council is composed of three wards electing three councillors each, totalling nine councillors.

The 2021 election was uncontested, with 2 seats left vacant. A by-election was scheduled to be held in 2022 to fill Greater Murray and Greater Wakool wards, however, following the close of nominations, only 1 candidate was nominated in each ward, resulting in the election of Geoff Wise for Greater Murray and Dennis Gleeson for Greater Wakool.

2021 New South Wales local elections: Murray River
Party	Votes	%	Swing	Seats	Change
Independent	unopposed			7	
Total				9	

=== Greater Murray ===
2021 New South Wales local elections: Greater Murray Ward
Party	Candidate	Votes	%	±%
Independent	Tom Weyrich	unopposed		
Independent	Kron Nicholas	unopposed		
Total formal votes				
Informal votes				
Turnout				

=== Greater Wakool ===
2021 New South Wales local elections: Greater Wakool Ward
Party	Candidate	Votes	%	±%
Independent	Neil Gorey	unopposed		
Independent	Ann-Louise Crowe	unopposed		
Total formal votes				
Informal votes				
Turnout				

=== Moama ===
2021 New South Wales local elections: Moama Ward
Party	Candidate	Votes	%	±%
Independent	Chris Bilkey	unopposed		
Independent	Nikki Cohen	unopposed		
Independent	Francis Crawley	unopposed		
Total formal votes				
Informal votes				
Turnout				

== Wentworth ==
2021 New South Wales local elections: Wentworth
Party	Candidate	Votes	%	±%
Independent	Daniel Linklater (elected)	831	25.1	
Independent National	Peter Crisp (elected)	495	14.9	
Independent	Steve Cooper (elected)	424	12.8	
Independent	Tim Elstone (elected)	393	11.8	
Independent	Susan Nichols (elected)	196	5.9	
Independent	Brian Beaumont (elected)	175	5.3	
Independent National	Bill Wheeldon (elected)	147	4.4	
Independent	Jo Rodda (elected)	135	4.1	
Independent	Greg Evans (elected)	125	3.8	
Independent	Jane MacAllister	124	3.7	
Independent	Steve Haywood (elected)	73	2.2	
Independent	Geoff Pegler	72	2.2	
Independent	Ash Beechey	49	1.5	
Independent	David Munday	34	1.0	
Independent	Kerry Roulston	24	0.7	
Independent	Colin Thiele	21	0.6	
Total formal votes		3,318	96.8	
Informal votes		108	3.2	
Turnout		3,426	79.1	
