= Noel Hicks =

Australian politician (born 1940)

Noel Hicks AM

Member of the Australian Parliament for Riverina and Riverina-Darling
- In office 18 October 1980 – 31 August 1998
- Preceded by: John FitzPatrick
- Succeeded by: Kay Hull

Personal details
- Born: 4 November 1940 (age 85) Adelaide, South Australia
- Party: National
- Spouses: Joan Carter (m. 1963; died 1988) Annie Lyle (m. 1991)
- Occupation: Plumber; Draughtsman

Noel Jeffrey Hicks AM (born 4 November 1940) is a former Australian politician. He was a member of the House of Representatives from 1980 to 1998, representing the New South Wales seats of Riverina and Riverina-Darling for the National Party. He also served as mayor of Broken Hill in the 1970s.

== Early life ==
Hicks was born in Adelaide on 4 November 1940. He was raised from the age of 15 by his uncle and aunt Dick and Edie Algate. He worked as a plumber and road design draftsman prior to entering politics. After moving to Broken Hill, New South Wales, he served on the Broken Hill City Council from 1971 to 1977, including two terms as mayor (1974–1975 and 1976–77). His term on the council concluded when he led his fellow councillors in a mass resignation over an industrial dispute between the Barrier Industrial Council and a council employee regarding the BIC's closed shop policy.

== Parliament of Australia ==
In 1980 he was elected to the Australian House of Representatives as the National Country member for Riverina, based on Broken Hill. He was the first non-Labor MP ever to represent Broken Hill in the Australian Federal Parliament, but he moved with his family to the larger town of Griffith the following year after committing to do so during the election campaign. At the Federal Election held in March 1983, despite defending a margin of only 0.5%, he retained the seat in the face of strong swings elsewhere to the eventual Hawke-Keating Labor Government.

Riverina was further enlarged in 1984, and renamed as the Division of Riverina-Darling. Hicks overcame another notional Labor majority, as well as former Country Party Member John Sullivan — now representing the Liberal Party — to win it. He was reelected for this seat in 1987 and 1990 against spirited Labor opposition in the form of his Broken Hill mayoral successor Peter Black.

Riverina-Darling was abolished in 1993, with Griffith and Wagga Wagga being combined in a recreated Riverina, while Broken Hill was transferred to the neighbouring Division of Parkes. After declining a Liberal proposal to move to the Senate, Hicks opted to contest the new Riverina, now a safe National seat. Despite some commentators' predictions that traditional Liberal voters in Wagga Wagga would hesitate to vote for a National candidate from Griffith, Hicks won the seat easily. He relegated the Liberal candidate, future-Senator Bill Heffernan, to third in the count behind the Labor candidate, former Wagga Wagga Mayor Pat Brassil.

He held this seat for two more terms until retiring in 1998.

== Other activities ==
Hicks chaired the Murrumbidgee General Practice Network Board and the Palliative Care Outcomes Collaboration Advisory Board, also serving as the Rotary Club president in Griffith. He was appointed as a Member of the Order of Australia (AM) in the 2022 Australia Day Honours for "significant service to the Parliament of Australia, and to the community of the Riverina".

== Personal life ==
Hicks married Joan Carter in 1963 and had four children. She was killed in a car accident in Tullibigeal on 10 August 1988. The couple were travelling to a school pageant at Condobolin when their vehicle struck a rough patch of road, before veering off into an embankment and colliding with a tree. He suffered a broken pelvis in the accident.

Hicks remarried in 1991 to Annie Lyle.

Civic offices
Preceded by George Dial	Mayor of Broken Hill; 1974–1975	Succeeded by Raymond Sawyers
Preceded by Raymond Sawyers	Mayor of Broken Hill; 1976–1977	Succeeded by Kevin Clarke
Parliament of Australia
Preceded by John FitzPatrick	Member for Riverina; 1980–1984	Division abolished
New division	Member for Riverina-Darling; 1984–1993	Division abolished
New division	Member for Riverina; 1993–1998	Succeeded by Kay Hull
