= Results of the 2024 New South Wales local elections in Murray and Far West =

2024 New South Wales local elections (Murray and Far West)
- 14 September 2024

This is a list of results for the 2024 New South Wales local elections in the Murray region, including the Far West.

Murray covers nine local government areas (LGAs), including the City of Albury. The Far West only has two LGAs − Broken Hill and Central Darling − as well as the Unincorporated Far West Region.

== Albury ==
2024 Albury City Council election
- 14 September 2024

All 9 seats on Albury City Council 5 seats needed for a majority
- Registered: 40,701
- Turnout: 79.6%
Party	Vote %	Seats	+/–
Team Mack	31.1	3	
Team Kylie	15.7	1	
Jessica Kellahan Team	13.2	1	
Stuart Baker Team	11.8	1	
Greens	9.6	1	
Alice Glachan's Team	8.2	1	
Labor	7.1	1	
This lists parties that won seats. See the complete results below.

Albury City Council is composed of a single ward.

Councillor Jessica Kellahan, who was elected in 2021 as part of the "Stuart Baker Team", announced in July 2024 that she had left Baker's group to run with the "Jessica Kellahan Team". Greens councillor Ashley Edwards ran in second position on her party's ticket, behind new candidate Geoff Hudson.

=== Albury results ===
2024 Albury City Council election
Party	Candidate	Votes	%	±%
Team Mack	1. Kevin Mack (elected 1); 2. Raissa Butkowski (elected 5); 3. Phillip Bullivant (elected 6); 4. Leigh McGlynn; 5. Dianne Thomas	9,415	31.1	
Team Kylie	1. Kylie King (elected 3); 2. Beth Docksey; 3. Steve Bowen; 4. Rhiannon Veness; 5. Taneesha Smith	4,769	15.7	−6.9
Jessica Kellahan Team	1. Jessica Kellahan (elected 4); 2. Michael Alexander; 3. Jodie Tiernan; 4. Jack Stean; 5. Amanda Giblin	4,011	13.2	
Stuart Baker Team	1. Stuart Baker (elected 2); 2. Stephen Mamouney; 3. Danielle Cale; 4. Lay Phommachanh; 5. Louise Pemberton	3,584	11.8	−5.3
Greens	1. Geoff Hudson (elected 8); 2. Ashley Edwards; 3. Dawn Dawson; 4. Joseph Lumanog; 5. Kofi Isaacs	2,898	9.6	−1.2
Alice Glachan's Team	1. Alice Glachan (elected 9); 2. Jane Gould; 3. Belinda Mead; 4. Naziya Singh; 5. Jackie Dunn	2,476	8.2	−5.8
Labor	1. Darren Cameron (elected 7); 2. Carolyn Hassarati; 3. David Baird; 4. Geoffrey Allen; 5. Christopher Ryan	2,160	7.1	−2.4
Independent Liberal	Isaac Eyalama	997	3.3	
Total formal votes		30,310	93.6	
Informal votes		2,084	6.4	
Turnout		32,394	79.6	

=== Albury summary ===
2024 Albury City Council election: Results summary
Party	Votes	%	Swing	Seats	Change
Team Mack	9,415	31.1		3	
Team Kylie	4,769	15.7	−6.9	1	
Jessica Kellahan Team	4,011	13.2		1	
Stuart Baker Team	3,584	11.8	−5.3	1	
Greens	2,898	9.6	−1.2	1	
Alice Glachan's Team	2,476	8.2	−5.8	1	
Labor	2,160	7.1	−2.4	1	
Independent Liberal	997	3.3		0	
Formal votes	30,310	93.6			
Informal votes	2,084	6.4			
Total	32,394	100.0		9	
Registered voters / turnout	40,701	79.6			

== Broken Hill ==
2024 Broken Hill City Council election
- 14 September 2025

All 10 seats on Broken Hill City Council 6 seats needed for a majority
- Registered: 13,055
- Mayor
	First party	Second party	Third party
	BBH		TBH
Candidate	Tom Kennedy	Darriea Turley	Dave Gallagher
Party	Better Broken Hill	Labor	Team Broken Hill
Primary vote	7,419	1,707	1,410
Percentage	70.4%	16.2%	13.4%
TCP	80.3%	19.7%
Mayor before election
Tom Kennedy
Better Broken Hill
Elected Mayor
Tom Kennedy
Better Broken Hill
- Councillors
- Turnout: 83.2% (▼0.2)
Party	Leader	Vote %	Seats	+/–
Better Broken Hill	Tom Kennedy	63.0	6	+1
Labor	Darriea Turley	22.8	2	0
Team Broken Hill	Dave Gallagher	12.6	1	−1
This lists parties that won seats. See the complete results below.

Broken Hill City Council is composed of a directly-elected mayor and a single ward.

All three groups/parties from 2021 recontested in 2024. Branco Licul, a former Labor councillor who unsuccessfully ran for re-election on the Labor ticket in 2021, contested as an ungrouped independent candidate.

=== Broken Hill mayor ===
2024 Broken Hill City Council election: Mayor
Party	Candidate	Votes	%	±%
For A Better Broken Hill	Tom Kennedy	7,419	70.4	
Labor	Darriea Turley	1,707	16.2	
Team Broken Hill	Dave Gallagher	1,410	13.4	
Total formal votes		10,536	96.8	
Informal votes		344	3.2	
Turnout		10,880		
Two-candidate-preferred result
For A Better Broken Hill	Tom Kennedy	7,841	80.3	
Labor	Darriea Turley	1,925	19.7	
For A Better Broken Hill hold		Swing		

=== Broken Hill results ===
2024 Broken Hill City Council election
Party	Candidate	Votes	%	±%
For A Better Broken Hill	1. Tom Kennedy; 2. Michael Boland (elected 3); 3. Jim Hickey (elected 4); 4. Bob Algate (elected 6); 5. Hayley Jewitt (elected 7); 6. Alan Chandler (elected 8); 7. Elaine Gillett (elected 9); 8. Thomas Kennedy; 9. James Elston	6,338	63.0	+12.6
Labor	1. Darriea Turley (elected 1); 2. Ashley Byrne (elected 5); 3. Blake Edgecombe; 4. Nathan Fell; 5. Richard Shoebridge	2,292	22.8	+1.0
Team Broken Hill	1. Dave Gallagher (elected 2); 2. Ron Page; 3. Dean Grose; 4. Matthew McCarthy; 5. Anita Hoysted	1,263	12.6	−12.0
Independent	Branko Licul	168	1.7	+1.7
Total formal votes		10,061	92.6	−0.8
Informal votes		801	7.4	+0.8
Turnout		10,862	83.2	−0.2

=== Broken Hill summary ===
2024 Broken Hill City Council election: Results summary
Party	Votes	%	Swing	Seats	Change
For A Better Broken Hill	6,338	63.0	+12.6	6	▲1
Labor	2,292	22.8	+1.0	2	Steady
Team Broken Hill	1,263	12.6	12.6	1	▼1
Independents	168	1.7		0	Steady
Formal votes	10,061	10,061	−0.8		
Informal votes	801	7.4	+0.8		
Total	10,862	100.0		9	
Registered voters / turnout	13,055	83.2	-0.2		

== Balranald ==
2024 Balranald Shire Council election
- 14 September 2024

All 8 seats on Balranald Shire Council
- Registered: 1,377
- Turnout: 76.7%
Party	Vote %	Seats	+/–
Independents	100.0	8	
This lists parties that won seats. See the complete results below.

Balranald Shire Council is composed of a single ward. No election was held in 2021 as the council was under administration.

=== Balranald results ===
2024 Balranald Shire Council election
Party	Candidate	Votes	%	±%
Independent	Dwaine Scott (elected 1)	243	23.5	
Independent	Luigi (Louie) Zaffina (elected 2)	241	23.3	
Independent	Tracy O'Halloran (elected 3)	88	8.5	
Independent	Philip Pippin (elected 4)	80	7.7	
Independent	Alison Linnett (elected 5)	78	7.5	
Independent	German Ugarte (elected 6)	73	7.1	
Independent	Iain Lindsay Field (elected 8)	72	7.0	
Independent	Patricia Winch	38	3.7	
Independent	Morgan Rasmus	36	3.5	
Independent	Leigh Byron (elected 7)	32	3.1	
Independent	Lynda Moss	24	2.3	
Independent	Ronald Mengler	22	2.1	
Independent	Brodie Rayner	7	0.7	
Total formal votes		1,034	97.9	
Informal votes		22	2.1	
Turnout		1,056	76.7	

=== Balranald summary ===
2024 Balranald Shire Council election: Results summary
Party	Votes	%	Swing	Seats	Change
Independents	1,034	100.0		8	
Formal votes	1,034	97.9			
Informal votes	22	2.1			
Total	1,056	100.0		8	
Registered voters / turnout	1,377	76.7			

== Berrigan ==
2024 Berrigan Shire Council election
- 14 September 2024

All 8 seats on Berrigan Shire Council 5 seats needed for a majority
- Turnout: 0.00% (▼80.5%)
	First party
	IND
Party	Independents
Last election	8 seats
Seats before	8
Seats won	7
Seat change	▼1
First preference vote	Unopposed
Largest party before election
Independents
Subsequent largest party
Independents

Berrigan Shire Council is composed of eight councillors elected proportionally to a single ward. 13 candidates contested the 2021 election, with Matthew Hannan receiving the highest individual first preference vote (17.6%).

The 2024 election was uncontested. A by-election will be held to fill the remaining eighth seat, with only several candidates nominating for the election.

=== Berrigan results ===
2024 New South Wales local elections: Berrigan
Party	Candidate	Votes	%	±%
Independent	Matthew Hannan (elected)	unopposed		
Independent	Catherine Healy (elected)	unopposed		
Independent	Julia Cornwell McKean (elected)	unopposed		
Independent	Renee Brooker (elected)	unopposed		
Independent	Renee Paine (elected)	unopposed		
Independent	John Stringer (elected)	unopposed		
Independent	Katie Ngatokoa (elected)	unopposed		
Registered electors				

== Edward River ==
2024 Edward River Council election
- 14 September 2024

All 9 seats on Edward River Council 5 seats needed for a majority
	First party	Second party
	IND	IND
Party	Independents	Ind. Liberal
Last election	7 seats	1 seat
Seats before	7	1
Largest party before election
Independents
Subsequent largest party
TBD

Edward River Council is composed of nine councillors elected proportionally to a single ward.

=== Edward River results ===
2024 New South Wales local elections: Edward River
Party	Candidate	Votes	%	±%
Independent	Kellie Crossley (elected)	1,002	20.2	
Independent	Ashley Hall (elected)	750	15.1	
Independent Liberal	Craig Druitt (elected)	745	15.0	
Independent	Frank Schofield (elected)	626	12.6	
Independent	Leanne Mulham (elected)	465	9.4	
Independent Liberal	Shirlee Burge (elected)	389	7.8	−2.4
Independent	Ken Bates (elected)	243	4.9	
Independent	Linda Fawns (elected)	156	3.1	−5.6
Independent	David Schoeffel	123	2.5	
Independent	Shannon Sampson (elected)	121	2.4	−0.6
Independent	Richard McDaid	111	2.2	
Independent	Airlie Circuitt	80	1.6	
Independent	Donna McFeeters	56	1.1	
Independent	Collin Sander	55	1.1	
Independent	Jeff Shand	33	0.7	
Independent	Greg Briscoe-Hough	15	0.3	
Total formal votes		4,970	95.2	
Informal votes		250	4.8	
Turnout		5,220	81.2	

== Federation ==
2024 Federation Council election
- 14 September 2024

All 9 seats on Federation Council 5 seats needed for a majority
	First party	Second party	Third party
	IND	HF	IND
Leader	N/A	Cheryl Cook	Todd Beaton
Party	Independents	Howlong First	Ind. SocAll
Last election	8 seats	Did not contest	Did not contest
Seats before	9	0	0
Largest party before election
Independents
Subsequent largest party
TBD

Federation Council is composed of nine councillors elected proportionally to a single ward. At the 2021 election, independents won eight seats, while Sally Hughes led the "For Future Federation" ticket and was elected.

Hughes is running in the 2024 election as an ungrouped independent. One group, "Howlong First", is composed entirely of residents of the town of Howlong.

=== Federation results ===
2024 New South Wales local elections: Federation
Party	Candidate	Votes	%	±%
Howlong First	1. Cheryl Cook (elected 1); 2. Susan Wearne (elected 8); 3. Michael Gardiner; 4. Damien Glass; 5. David Longley	1,419	19.0	
Independent	1. Andrew Kennedy (elected 2); 2. Chanade Seiler; 3. Nathan Parker; 4. Robert Purtle; 5. Nicole Urquhart	1,009	13.5	−1.6
Independent	1. Derek Schoen (elected 3); 2. Michael Robson; 3. Melanie Trevethan; 4. Matthew Mahon; 5. Theresea Hughes	924	12.3	
Independent	David Bott (elected 4)	762	10.2	
Independent	1. Richard Nixon (elected 6); 2. Robert Pearce; 3. Rowley Bennett; 4. Rosie Dye; 5. Susan Curran	649	8.7	
Independent	1. David Harrison (elected 7); 2. Ray McLarty; 3. Julianne Whyte; 4. Dean Druce; 5. John Crothers	613	8.2	+4.8
Independent	Rowena Black (elected 5)	604	8.1	+1.4
Independent	1. Patrick Bourke (elected 9); 2. David Fahey; 3. Leeanne Dalitz; 4. John Doyle; 5. Mareeta Corcoran	579	7.7	−14.1
Independent	1. Shaun Whitechurch; 2. Norman Wales; 3. Daniel Webb; 4. Brooke Ollington; 5. Katrina Whitechurch	455	6.1	−4.5
Independent	Sally Hughes	303	4.1	−5.3
Independent	Frederick Longmire	168	2.2	
Ind. Socialist Alliance	Todd Beaton	4	0.1	
Total formal votes		7,489	93.5	−0.5
Informal votes		522	6.5	+0.5
Turnout		8,011	80.4	+0.8

== Greater Hume ==
2024 Greater Hume Shire Council election
- 14 September 2024

All 9 seats on Greater Hume Shire Council 5 seats needed for a majority
	First party	Second party
	IND	IND
Party	Independents	Ind. Liberal
Last election	9 seats	Did not contest
Seats before	9	0
Largest party before election
Independents
Subsequent largest party
TBD

Greater Hume Shire Council is composed of three wards electing three councillors each, totalling nine councillors.

=== Greater Hume results ===
2024 New South Wales local elections: Greater Hume
Party	Votes	%	Swing	Seats	Change
Independent					
Independent Liberal					
Formal votes					
Informal votes					
Total				9	

=== East ===
2024 New South Wales local elections: East Ward
Party	Candidate	Votes	%	±%
Independent	Lea Parker (elected)	unopposed		
Independent	Tony Quinn (elected)	unopposed		
Independent	Kerry Morton (elected)	unopposed		
Registered electors				

=== North ===
2024 New South Wales local elections: North Ward
Party	Candidate	Votes	%	±%
Independent	Brian Liston (elected)	754	34.0	
Independent	Annette Schilg (elected)	521	23.5	−5.9
Independent	Benjamin Hooper (elected)	397	17.9	
Independent	Ian Forrest	330	14.9	−4.1
Independent	Rodney Knight	218	9.8	
Total formal votes		2,220	93.6	
Informal votes		152	6.4	
Turnout		2,372	84.9	

=== West ===
2024 New South Wales local elections: West Ward
Party	Candidate	Votes	%	±%
Independent	Ashley Lindner (elected)	711	32.0	+4.7
Independent	Jenny O'Neill (elected)	660	29.7	−2.1
Independent	Matt Hicks (elected)	370	16.6	−2.2
Independent Liberal	Andrew Garratt	337	15.2	
Independent	Talia Mitchell	145	6.5	
Total formal votes		2,223	93.2	
Informal votes		163	6.8	
Turnout		2,386	83.6	

== Murray River ==
2024 Murray River Council election
- 14 September 2024

All 9 seats on Murray River Council 5 seats needed for a majority
- Turnout: 0.00% (▼85.0%)
	First party	Second party
	IND	IND
Party	Independents	Ind. Liberal
Last election	9 seats	Did not contest
Seats before	9	0
Largest party before election
Independents
Subsequent largest party
TBD

Murray River Council is composed of three wards electing three councillors each, totalling nine councillors.

=== Murray River results ===
2024 New South Wales local elections: Murray River
Party	Votes	%	Swing	Seats	Change
Independent					
Independent Liberal					
Formal votes					
Informal votes					
Total				9	

=== Greater Murray ===
2024 New South Wales local elections: Greater Murray Ward
Party	Candidate	Votes	%	±%
Independent	Kylie Berryman (elected)	656	29.9	
Independent	Geoffrey Wise (elected)	560	25.6	
Independent Liberal	Lorraine Allan (elected)	305	13.9	
Independent	Norman Berger	305	13.9	
Independent	Tom Weyrich	257	11.7	
Independent	Kronrod Nicholas	108	4.9	
Total formal votes		2,191	94.9	
Informal votes		117	5.1	
Turnout		2,308	73.6	

=== Greater Wakool ===
2024 New South Wales local elections: Greater Wakool Ward
Party	Candidate	Votes	%	±%
Independent	Gary Pappin (elected)	unopposed		
Independent	Neil Gorey (elected)	unopposed		
Independent	Dennis Gleeson (elected)	unopposed		
Total formal votes				
Informal votes				
Turnout				

=== Moama ===
2024 New South Wales local elections: Moama Ward
Party	Candidate	Votes	%	±%
Independent Liberal	John Harvie	446	20.3	
Independent	Graeme Blow	254	11.5	
Independent	Christopher Bilkey	313	14.2	
Independent	Francis Crawley	154	7.0	
Independent	Gen Campbell	460	20.9	
Independent	Michael John Ludeman	145	6.6	
Independent	Bianca Hurn	431	19.6	
Total formal votes		2,202	94.1	
Informal votes		139	5.9	
Turnout		2,341	74.8	

== Wentworth ==
2024 Wentworth Shire Council election
- 14 September 2024

All 9 seats on Wentworth Shire Council 5 seats needed for a majority
	First party	Second party
	IND	IND
Party	Independents	Ind. National
Last election	7 seats	2 seats
Seats before	6	2
Largest party before election
Independents
Subsequent largest party
TBD

=== Wentworth results ===
2024 New South Wales local elections: Wentworth
Party	Candidate	Votes	%	±%
Independent National	Daniel Linklater (elected)	1,496	44.9	+19.8
Independent National	Peter Crisp (elected)	416	12.5	−2.4
Independent	Tim Elstone (elected)	384	11.5	−0.3
Independent	Jo Rodda (elected)	170	5.1	+1.0
Independent	Susan Nichols (elected)	151	4.5	−1.4
Independent	Michael Weeding (elected)	130	3.9	
Independent	Brian Beaumont	114	3.4	−1.9
Independent National	Bill Wheeldon	111	3.3	−1.0
Independent National	Jon Armstrong (elected)	105	3.2	
Independent	Greg Evans (elected)	103	3.1	−0.7
Independent	Jody Starick (elected)	78	2.3	
Independent	Ivan Behsmann	76	2.3	
Total formal votes		3,334	96.3	
Informal votes		127	3.7	
Turnout		3,461	73.7	
