= List of mayors of Broken Hill =

Mayor of Broken Hill
- Incumbent; Tom Kennedy since 4 December 2021
- Appointer: Broken Hill City Council
- Term length: 4 years
- Inaugural holder: Richard Piper
- Formation: 3 December 1888

This is a list of the mayors and lord mayors of the City of Broken Hill, a local government area of New South Wales, Australia.

The current mayor is Tom Kennedy, who was elected in December 2021.

== Mayors ==
Mayor	Party	Term	Notes
Richard Piper	Independent	3 December 1888 – 11 February 1889	
Zebina Lane	Independent	11 February 1889 – 12 February 1890	
Thomas Coombe	Independent	12 February 1890 – 10 February 1891	
George John Morgan	Independent	10 February 1891 – 18 February 1892	
August Carl Töpperwien	Independent	18 February 1892 – 16 February 1893	
Arthur Evans Martin	Independent	16 February 1893 – 21 December 1893	
Dennis Creedon	Independent	22 December 1893 – 16 February 1894	
Patrick McMahon	Independent	16 February 1894 – 13 February 1895	
George Thomas Lambert	Independent	13 February 1895 – 10 February 1896	
John Souter	Independent	10 February 1896 – 10 February 1897	
Robert F. Holdsworth	Independent	10 February 1897 – 14 February 1898	
George Strachan	Independent	14 February 1898 – 21 February 1899	
John Dunstan	Independent	21 February 1899 – 16 February 1900	
Jabez Wright	Labor	16 February 1900 – 14 February 1901	
William John Retallick	Labor	14 February 1901 – 13 February 1902	
Thomas Jackson	Labor	13 February 1902 – 12 February 1903	
Alexander Hendry	Independent	12 February 1903 – 12 February 1904	
John Henry Ivey	Labor	12 February 1904 – 16 February 1905	
Francis Richard Harvey	Labor	16 February 1905 – 16 February 1906	
Thomas Ivey	Labor	16 February 1906 – 12 February 1907	
Calvin Chester	Labor	12 February 1907 – 6 February 1908	
John Henry Ivey	Labor	6 February 1908 – 9 February 1909	
John Long	Labor	9 February 1909 – 14 February 1910	
Francis Richard Harvey	Labor	14 February 1910 – 3 February 1911	
Thomas Glover Marks	Labor	3 February 1911 – 5 March 1912	
Bernard Brady	Labor	5 March 1912 – 1 March 1913	
Thomas Francis Hynes	Labor	1 March 1913 – 5 February 1914	
William Bernard Driscoll	Labor	5 February 1914 – 11 February 1915	
George Wilson Carroll	Labor	11 February 1915 – 14 February 1916	
William Bernard Driscoll	Labor	14 February 1916 – 12 July 1917	
Thomas Francis Hynes	Labor	12 July 1917 – 28 February 1919	
John H. Wicks	Independent	1 March 1919 – 23 December 1920	
S. R. Gray	Independent	23 December 1920 – 22 December 1921	
John H. Wicks	Independent	22 December 1921 – 18 December 1922	
Samuel Townsend	Independent	18 December 1922 – December 1924	
Alfred Stanley Rawling	Independent	December 1924 – December 1925	
Richard Dennis	Labor	December 1925 – December 1928	
William Shoobridge	Independent	December 1928 – December 1929	
Richard Dennis	Labor	December 1929 – 17 December 1931	
H. C. Cleeland	Labor	17 December 1931 – 21 December 1933	
E. J. Barnes	Labor	21 December 1933 – 5 December 1937	
George Lambert	Labor	16 December 1937 – 5 July 1939	
Percy John Francis Rowe	Labor	18 July 1939 – 20 July 1948	
Walter Riddiford	Labor	3 August 1948 – December 1962	
George Dial	Labor	December 1962 – September 1974	
Noel Hicks	Independent	September 1974 – September 1975	
Raymond Sawyers	Independent	September 1975 – September 1976	
Noel Hicks	Independent	September 1976 – September 1977	
Kevin Clarke	Labor	September 1977 – September 1980	
Peter Black	Labor	September 1980 – September 1999	
Ron Page	Broken Hill First	September 1999 – 10 January 2007	
Ken Boyle (Administrator)		10 January 2007 – 5 December 2009	
Wincen Cuy	Independent	5 December 2009 – 10 September 2016	
Darriea Turley AM	Country Labor	10 September 2016 – 4 December 2021	
Tom Kennedy	For A Better Broken Hill	4 December 2021 – present	

== Election results ==
=== 2024 ===
2024 Broken Hill City Council election: Mayor
Party	Candidate	Votes	%	±%
For A Better Broken Hill	Tom Kennedy	7,419	70.4	
Labor	Darriea Turley	1,707	16.2	
Team Broken Hill	Dave Gallagher	1,410	13.4	
Total formal votes		10,536	96.8	
Informal votes		344	3.2	
Turnout		10,880		
Two-candidate-preferred result
For A Better Broken Hill	Tom Kennedy	7,841	80.3	
Labor	Darriea Turley	1,925	19.7	
For A Better Broken Hill hold		Swing		

=== 2021 ===
2021 New South Wales mayoral elections: Broken Hill
Party	Candidate	Votes	%	±%
For A Better Broken Hill	Tom Kennedy	5,868	54.3	+30.1
Labor	Darriea Turley	2,533	23.4	−5.8
Team Broken Hill	Dave Gallagher	2,411	22.3	−6.3
Total formal votes		10,812	97.5	
Informal votes		272	2.5	
Turnout		11,084	83.1	
For A Better Broken Hill gain from Labor		Swing	N/A	
