= Division of Riverina-Darling =

Former Australian federal electoral division

Riverina-Darling Australian House of Representatives Division
- Created: 1984
- Abolished: 1993
- Namesake: Riverina, Darling River

The Division of Riverina-Darling was an Australian electoral division in the state of New South Wales. It was located in south-west rural New South Wales, and included the towns of Broken Hill, Griffith, Hay and Narrandera. The Division was created in 1984, largely replacing the abolished Division of Riverina. Its name indicated its relationship with Riverina and the seat of Darling, abolished in 1977. The new division covered areas that were covered by Darling until 1977, and Riverina between 1977 and 1984.

Riverina-Darling had a notional Labor majority on its creation. However, it included most of the old Riverina, and was thus a natural choice for that seat's member, Noel Hicks of the National Party, to transfer for the 1984 election. Hicks overcame the Labor majority to win in 1984, and continued to fend off spirited challenges from Labor until it was abolished in 1993. Broken Hill was transferred to Parkes, while most of its remaining territory became a recreated Riverina, which became a safe National seat as a result.

During its existence, Riverina-Darling covered the north-west corner of the state, including Cameron Corner. As of 2026, the majority of Riverina-Darling is now covered by Parkes.

== Members ==
| Image | Member | Party | Term | Notes |
|---|---|---|---|---|
| | Noel Hicks (1940–) | Nationals | 1 December 1984 – 13 March 1993 | Previously held the Division of Riverina. Transferred to the Division of Riverina after Riverina-Darling was abolished in 1993 |
