= City of Broken Hill =

- Local government area
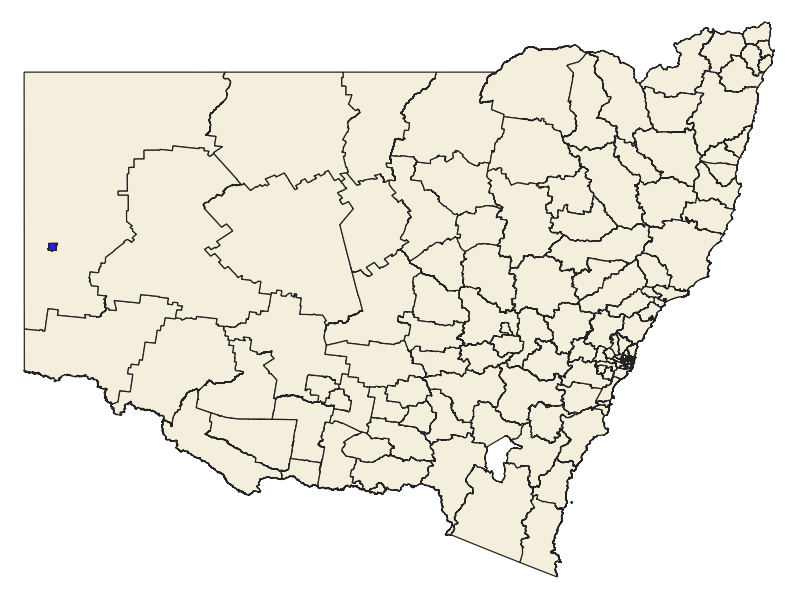
- Location in New South Wales
- Interactive map of City of Broken Hill
- Coordinates: 31°57′S 141°27′E
- Country: Australia
- State: New South Wales
- Region: Far West
- Established: 22 September 1888
- Council seat: Council Chambers, Broken Hill

Government
  - Mayor: Tom Kennedy (Independent)
  - State electorate: Barwon
  - Federal division: Parkes

Area
  - Total: 170 km^{2} (66 sq mi)

Population
  - Totals: 17,588 (2021 census); 17,479 (2019 est.)
  - Density: 103.5/km^{2} (268/sq mi)
- Time zone: UTC+9:30 (ACST)
  - Summer (DST): UTC+10:30 (ACDT)
- County: Yancowinna
- Website: City of Broken Hill
LGAs around City of Broken Hill
	Unincorporated Far West
Unincorporated Far West	City of Broken Hill	Unincorporated Far West
	Unincorporated Far West

The City of Broken Hill is a local government area in the Far West region of New South Wales, Australia. The area contains an isolated mining city, Broken Hill, located in the outback of New South Wales and is surrounded by the Unincorporated Far West Region. The city is located adjacent to the Silver City and Barrier Highways and the Broken Hill railway line.

As of 2021 the mayor of the City of Broken Hill Council is Tom Kennedy, an independent politician.

== Council history ==
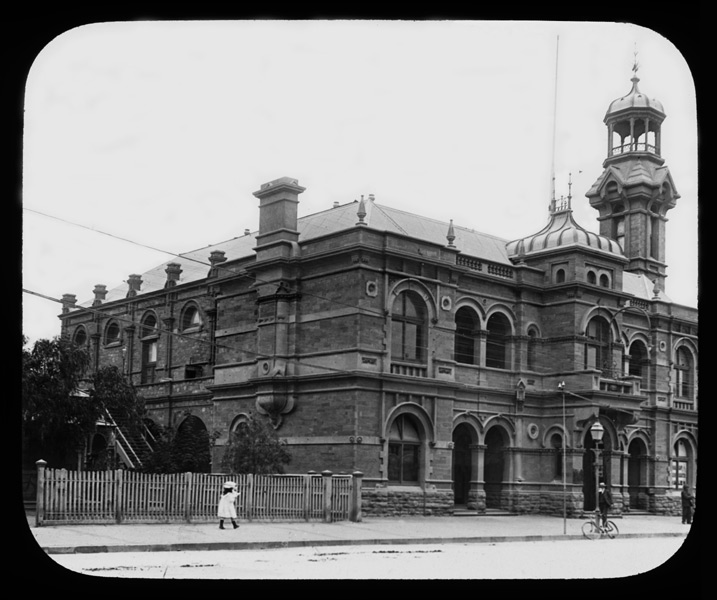
The Broken Hill Town Hall, completed in 1890, was the council seat until 1968.

Following a petition submitted by residents to the Colonial Secretary on 2 May 1888, the Municipal District of Broken Hill was first incorporated on 22 September 1888. The incorporation occurred during a typhoid epidemic, which killed 128 people, and the need for public health and water supply provisions was one of the main driving forces behind incorporation, and one of the biggest issues for the new municipality. One contemporary report commented that "The town is in a terrible state owing to defective sanitary arrangements. People continue to leave by trains daily in hundreds in view of the impending drought." As a consequence, in 1892 the private Broken Hill Water Supply Company completed construction on the Stephens Creek Reservoir, which provided the first reliable clean water supply to the town.

The first council was divided into four wards: Burke, Wills, Sturt and King, each returning three aldermen, and the first election, conducted by Charles George Gibson as Returning Officer, was held at the Broken Hill Court House on 24 November 1888. The ward system remained in place until early 1909 when the council requested that the state government abolish the wards and elect the aldermen proportionally, which was proclaimed on 24 May 1909. By 1891 the population had passed 23,000, making Broken Hill the third largest town in New South Wales, and that number continued to grow, reaching 25,000 by 1897. Civic improvements, spurred on by silver mining profits, continued during the 1890s with the construction of schools, a technical college, town hall, post offices and jail. Timber and temporary structures gave way to brick and stone, the town's streets were paved and recreation reserves were planted with trees. The council commissioned the Town Hall, designed in the Italianate style by Whittall & Wells of Adelaide, with the foundation stone laid by Sir Henry Parkes on 3 April 1890. The hall was officially opened by the Governor of New South Wales, Lord Jersey, with the Governor of South Australia, Lord Kintore, in attendance, on 6 August 1891.

The council was renamed the Municipality of Broken Hill following the passage of the Municipalities Act, 1897 on 6 December 1897. The council's population continue to grow in this period and by 1906, the council resolved to apply for City status, being able to fulfil the city conditions set in Local Government Act, 1906, and the City of Broken Hill was proclaimed on 17 July 1907, the only municipality to do so under the 1906 act.

=== Later history ===
Following the release of the report of public inquiry that detailed ongoing infighting among councillors and their conflicts with staff and councillor interference in operational matters, on 10 January 2007 the council was dismissed by the Minister for Local Government, Kerry Hickey. The elected council was replaced by a single Administrator, with the former Broken Hill General Manager, Ken Boyle, appointed. Elections originally scheduled for September 2008 were deferred and the council remained under administration until a special election held on 5 December 2009.

In 2015, Broken Hill became the first city in Australia to be included on the National Heritage List.

== Demography ==
Selected historical census data for Broken Hill local government area
Census year		2001	2006	2011	2016
Population	Estimated residents on census night	20,274	▼19,361	▼18,517	▼17,708
Population	LGA rank in terms of size within New South Wales			72nd	72nd
Population	% of New South Wales population				
Population	% of Australian population				
Cultural and language diversity
Ancestry, top responses	English				6,782
Ancestry, top responses	Australian				8,424
Ancestry, top responses	Italian				
Ancestry, top responses	Scottish				1,476
Ancestry, top responses	Irish				1,667
Language, top responses (other than English)	Italian				45
Language, top responses (other than English)	Mandarin				
Language, top responses (other than English)	Cantonese				
Language, top responses (other than English)	Korean				
Language, top responses (other than English)	Maltese				19
Religious affiliation
Religious affiliation, top responses	Catholic				
Religious affiliation, top responses	No religion				
Religious affiliation, top responses	Anglican				
Religious affiliation, top responses	Eastern Orthodox				
Religious affiliation, top responses	Buddhism				
Median weekly incomes
Personal income	Median weekly personal income			A$	
Personal income	% of Australian median income				
Family income	Median weekly family income				
Family income	% of Australian median income				
Household income	Median weekly household income				
Household income	% of Australian median income				

== Council ==
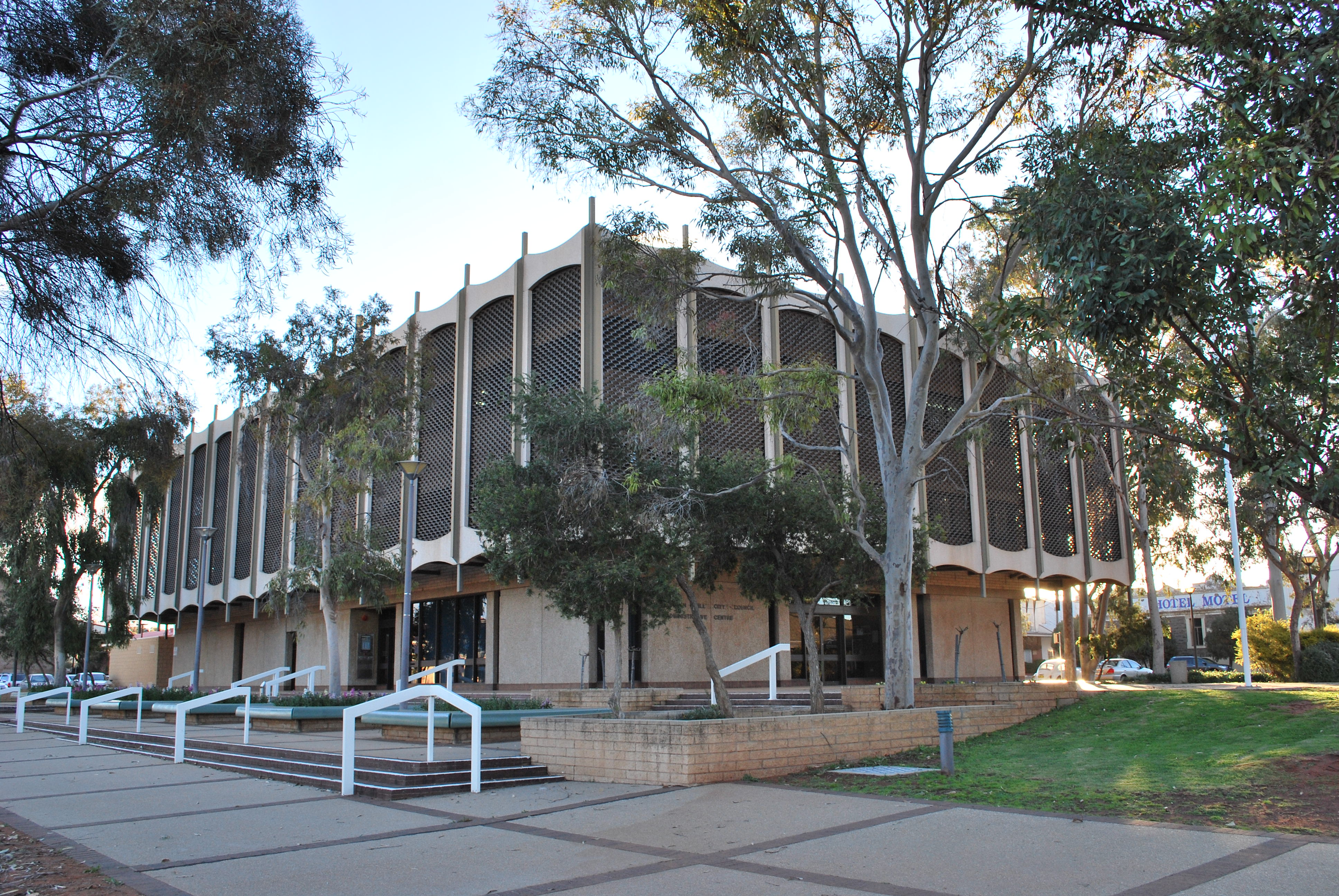
Broken Hill Administration Centre and Council Chambers has been the council seat since 1968.

=== Current composition and election method ===
Broken Hill City Council is composed of nine councillors elected proportionally as a single ward. All councillors are elected for a fixed four-year term of office. The mayor is elected directly by a popular vote. The most recent election was held on 4 December 2021 and the makeup of the council is as follows:

Party	Councillors
For A Better Broken Hill	6
Team Broken Hill	2
Labor	2
Total	10

The current Council, elected in 2021, in order of election, is:

Mayor	Party	Notes
Tom Kennedy	Better Broken Hill	Mayor 2021–date
Councillor	Party	Notes
Dave Gallagher	Team Broken Hill	Deputy Mayor 2014–2017
Michael Boland	Better Broken Hill	
Darriea Turley	Country Labor	Mayor 2016–2021, Deputy Mayor 1997–1998, 2001–2002, 2012–2014
Bob Algate	Better Broken Hill	
Ronald Page	Team Broken Hill	
Marion Browne	Labor	Deputy Mayor 2017–2021
Jim Hickey	Better Broken Hill	Deputy Mayor 2021–date
Hayley Jewitt	Better Broken Hill	
Alan Chandler	Better Broken Hill	

== Election results ==
=== 2024 ===
2024 Broken Hill City Council election: Results summary
Party	Votes	%	Swing	Seats	Change
For A Better Broken Hill	6,338	63.0	+12.6	6	▲1
Labor	2,292	22.8	+1.0	2	Steady
Team Broken Hill	1,263	12.6	12.6	1	▼1
Independents	168	1.7		0	Steady
Formal votes	10,061	10,061	−0.8		
Informal votes	801	7.4	+0.8		
Total	10,862	100.0		9	
Registered voters / turnout	13,055	83.2	-0.2		

=== 2021 ===
2021 New South Wales local elections: Broken Hill
Party	Candidate	Votes	%	±%
For A Better Broken Hill	1. Tom Kennedy; 2. Michael Boland (elected); 3. Bob Algate (elected); 4. Jim Hickey (elected); 5. Hayley Jewitt (elected); 6. Alan Chandler (elected)	5,237	50.4	+50.4
Team Broken Hill	1. Dave Gallagher (elected); 2. Ron Page (elected); 3. Dinny Reardon; 4. Patrick Reincke; 5. Matthew McCarthy	2,549	24.5	−1.8
Labor	1. Darriea Turley (elected); 2. Marion Browne (elected); 3. Branko Licul; 4. Ashley Byrne; 5. Blake Egdecombe; 6. Nathan Fell	2,263	21.8	−16.9
Independent	Gigi Barbe	346	3.3	+3.3
Total formal votes		10,395	93.4	
Informal votes		732	6.6	
Turnout		11,127	83.4	

== See also ==
- List of local government areas in New South Wales
