= Electoral results for the district of Cabramatta =

Election results for Cabramatta, New South Wales, Australia

Cabramatta, an electoral district of the Legislative Assembly in the Australian state of New South Wales, was created in 1981 and has always been held by the Labor party.

== Members for Cabramatta ==
Election	Member	Party
1981	Eric Bedford	Labor
1984	Eric Bedford	Labor
1986 by	John Newman	Labor
1988	John Newman	Labor
1991	John Newman	Labor
1994 by	Reba Meagher	Labor
1995	Reba Meagher	Labor
1999	Reba Meagher	Labor
2003	Reba Meagher	Labor
2007	Reba Meagher	Labor
2008 by	Nick Lalich	Labor
2011	Nick Lalich	Labor
2015	Nick Lalich	Labor
2019	Nick Lalich	Labor
2023	Tri Vo	Labor

== Election results ==
=== Elections in the 2020s ===
2023 New South Wales state election: Cabramatta
Party	Candidate	Votes	%	±%
Labor	Tri Vo	21,213	41.3	−7.2
Liberal	Courtney Nguyen	11,604	22.6	+1.6
Independent	Kate Hoang	8,522	16.6	+16.6
Liberal Democrats	Mark Smaling	5,046	9.8	+9.8
Greens	Roz Chia Davis	2,645	5.2	−0.1
Animal Justice	Randa Moussa	2,299	4.5	+3.9
Total formal votes		51,329	94.5	−1.1
Informal votes		3,005	5.5	+1.1
Turnout		54,334	88.4	−3.0
Two-party-preferred result
Labor	Tri Vo	24,460	61.8	−7.5
Liberal	Courtney Nguyen	15,117	38.2	+7.5
Labor hold		Swing	−7.5	

=== Elections in the 2010s ===
==== 2019 ====
2019 New South Wales state election: Cabramatta
Party	Candidate	Votes	%	±%
Labor	Nick Lalich	23,616	49.88	−10.01
Independent	Dai Le	12,250	25.88	+25.87
Liberal	Austin Le	7,018	14.82	−13.42
Greens	Christopher James	2,384	5.04	−0.13
Independent	Phuoc Vo	2,075	4.38	+4.38
Total formal votes		47,343	95.75	+0.24
Informal votes		2,102	4.25	−0.24
Turnout		49,445	89.91	−0.76
Two-party-preferred result
Labor	Nick Lalich	27,375	75.53	+8.33
Liberal	Austin Le	8,871	24.47	−8.33
Two-candidate-preferred result
Labor	Nick Lalich	25,089	62.87	−4.33
Independent	Dai Le	14,818	37.13	+4.33
Labor hold		Swing	−4.33	

==== 2015 ====
2015 New South Wales state election: Cabramatta
Party	Candidate	Votes	%	±%
Labor	Nick Lalich	28,568	59.9	+14.5
Liberal	Maria Diep	13,472	28.2	−13.6
Greens	Bill Cashman	2,466	5.2	−2.6
Christian Democrats	Don Modarelli	1,959	4.1	−0.3
No Land Tax	Eddie Canto	1,233	2.6	+2.6
Total formal votes		47,698	95.5	+1.0
Informal votes		2,243	4.5	−1.0
Turnout		49,941	90.7	−1.3
Two-party-preferred result
Labor	Nick Lalich	29,745	67.2	+15.3
Liberal	Maria Diep	14,519	32.8	−15.3
Labor hold		Swing	+15.3	

==== 2011 ====
2011 New South Wales state election: Cabramatta
Party	Candidate	Votes	%	±%
Labor	Nick Lalich	20,924	46.7	−22.3
Liberal	Dai Le	18,990	42.4	+26.1
Greens	Daniel Griffiths	3,385	7.6	+0.7
Christian Democrats	Peter Tadros	1,467	3.3	+3.3
Total formal votes		44,766	96.1	0.0
Informal votes		1,839	3.9	0.0
Turnout		46,605	93.0	
Two-party-preferred result
Labor	Nick Lalich	21,702	52.1	−26.9
Liberal	Dai Le	19,934	47.9	+26.9
Labor hold		Swing	−26.9	

=== Elections in the 2000s ===
==== 2008 by-election ====
2008 Cabramatta state by-election
Party	Candidate	Votes	%	±%
Labor	Nick Lalich	21,423	50.96	−18.11
Liberal	Dai Le	15,347	36.51	+20.18
Greens	Lindsay Langlands	3,775	8.98	+2.09
Christian Democrats	Doug Morrison	673	1.60	+1.60
Business	Joseph Adams	650	1.55	+1.55
Communist League	Alasdair Macdonald	168	0.40	+0.40
Total formal votes		42,036	96.95	+0.87
Informal votes		1,321	3.05	−0.87
Turnout		43,357	86.05	−6.53
Two-party-preferred result
Labor	Nick Lalich	21,933	57.22	−21.82
Liberal	Dai Le	16,396	42.78	+21.82
Labor hold		Swing	−21.82	

==== 2007 ====
2007 New South Wales state election: Cabramatta
Party	Candidate	Votes	%	±%
Labor	Reba Meagher	29,962	69.1	+3.1
Liberal	Victor Smith	7,082	16.3	+4.7
Unity	Andrew Su	3,343	7.7	+0.1
Greens	Rodrigo Gutierrez	2,988	6.9	+3.8
Total formal votes		43,375	96.1	−0.3
Informal votes		1,770	3.9	+0.3
Turnout		45,145	92.6	
Two-party-preferred result
Labor	Reba Meagher	31,584	79.0	−2.4
Liberal	Victor Smith	8,373	21.0	+2.4
Labor hold		Swing	−2.4	

==== 2003 ====
2003 New South Wales state election: Cabramatta
Party	Candidate	Votes	%	±%
Labor	Reba Meagher	25,374	66.5	+17.3
Liberal	Paul Newton	4,245	11.1	+2.9
Independent	Ross Treyvaud	3,830	10.0	+10.0
Unity	Christopher Wong	2,608	6.8	−7.0
Greens	Lee Grant	1,097	2.9	+1.7
Christian Democrats	Sean Hampsey	647	1.7	+0.0
One Nation	David Taunton-Webb	337	0.9	−4.2
Total formal votes		38,138	96.6	+0.7
Informal votes		1,356	3.4	−0.7
Turnout		39,494	92.2	
Two-party-preferred result
Labor	Reba Meagher	27,328	81.7	+12.8
Liberal	Paul Newton	6,115	18.3	+18.3
Labor hold		Swing	+12.8	

=== Elections in the 1990s ===
==== 1999 ====
1999 New South Wales state election: Cabramatta
Party	Candidate	Votes	%	±%
Labor	Reba Meagher	18,859	49.3	−16.7
Independent	Markus Lambert	5,706	14.9	+14.9
Unity	Andrew Su	5,286	13.8	+13.8
Liberal	Glenn Watson	3,141	8.2	−15.7
One Nation	Peter Cornish	1,954	5.1	+5.1
Independent	Ken Chapman	1,492	3.9	+3.9
Christian Democrats	Jodi Luke	634	1.7	+1.7
Democrats	Matthew Hua	505	1.3	−2.9
Greens	Lee Grant	461	1.2	+1.2
AAFI	Michael Kremec	241	0.6	+0.6
Total formal votes		38,279	95.9	+5.6
Informal votes		1,652	4.1	−5.6
Turnout		39,931	92.2	
Notional two-party-preferred count
Labor	Reba Meagher	22,211	79.9	+8.0
Liberal	Glenn Watson	5,586	20.1	−8.0
Two-candidate-preferred result
Labor	Reba Meagher	21,144	68.9	−3.0
Independent	Markus Lambert	9,555	31.1	+31.1
Labor hold		Swing	−3.0	

==== 1995 ====
1995 New South Wales state election: Cabramatta
Party	Candidate	Votes	%	±%
Labor	Reba Meagher	23,058	65.4	+13.7
Liberal	Rocky Gattellari	8,636	24.5	+2.7
Democrats	Dianela Reverberi	1,505	4.3	+2.6
Independent	Bob Aiken	1,151	3.3	+3.3
Citizen Opinion Law Order	Mick Horgan	907	2.6	+2.6
Total formal votes		35,257	90.3	+8.1
Informal votes		3,796	9.7	−8.1
Turnout		39,053	93.6	
Two-party-preferred result
Labor	Reba Meagher	24,174	71.2	+5.2
Liberal	Rocky Gattellari	9,755	28.8	−5.2
Labor hold		Swing	+5.2	

==== 1994 by-election ====
1994 Cabramatta by-election Saturday 22 October
Party	Candidate	Votes	%	±%
Labor	Reba Meagher	22,701	72.65	+21.0
Independent	Nghiep Nguyen	3,646	11.67	
Call to Australia	Brian Grigg	1,498	4.79	
Independent	Chris Moore	1,361	4.36	
Daylight Saving Extension	Tony de Govrik	865	2.77	
Independent	Mark Stevens	680	2.18	
No Party Affiliation	Ted Oldfield	497	1.59	
Total formal votes		27,172	95.11	
Informal votes		1,398	4.89	
Turnout		28,570	76.97	
Two-candidate-preferred result
Labor	Reba Meagher	24,367	83.94	+17.94
Independent	Nghiep Nguyen	4,663	16.06	
Labor hold		Swing		

John Newman (Labor) was murdered.

==== 1991 ====
1991 New South Wales state election: Cabramatta
Party	Candidate	Votes	%	±%
Labor	John Newman	14,431	51.7	+0.1
Liberal	Bill Karagiannis	6,096	21.8	−19.1
Independent	Phuong Ngo	3,320	11.9	+11.9
Independent	Maria Heggie	2,486	8.9	+8.9
Independent	Anthony Thai	625	2.2	+2.2
Independent	Albert Ranse	487	1.7	+1.7
Democrats	Sam McLeod	473	1.7	+0.5
Total formal votes		27,918	82.2	−12.0
Informal votes		6,047	17.8	+12.0
Turnout		33,965	93.9	
Two-party-preferred result
Labor	John Newman	16,171	66.0	+10.5
Liberal	Bill Karagiannis	8,319	34.0	−10.5
Labor hold		Swing	+10.5	

=== Elections in the 1980s ===
==== 1988 ====
1988 New South Wales state election: Cabramatta
Party	Candidate	Votes	%	±%
Labor	John Newman	14,548	52.9	−12.0
Liberal	Maria Heggie	11,084	40.3	+5.8
Independent	Duy Nguyen-Quang	963	3.5	+3.5
Independent	Ted Oldfield	924	3.4	+3.4
Total formal votes		27,519	94.4	−1.3
Informal votes		1,639	5.6	+1.3
Turnout		29,158	93.1	
Two-party-preferred result
Labor	John Newman	15,015	56.6	−8.6
Liberal	Maria Heggie	11,503	43.4	+8.6
Labor hold		Swing	−8.6	

==== 1986 by-election ====
1986 Cabramatta by-election Saturday 1 February
Party	Candidate	Votes	%	±%
Labor	John Newman	13,411	49.36	−15.7
Liberal	Maria Heggie	9,020	33.20	−1.7
Nuclear Disarmament	Virginia Rigney	1,735	6.39	
Call to Australia	Alan Byers	1,408	5.18	
Democrats	Robert Neesam	1,257	4.63	
Independent	Stephen Biscoe	276	1.02	
Small Business and Enterprise Party	Kusala Fitzroy-Mendis	65	0.24	
Total formal votes		27,172	95.11	
Informal votes		1,398	4.89	
Turnout		28,570	76.97	
Two-party-preferred result
Labor	John Newman		58.8	
Liberal	Maria Heggie		41.2	
Labor hold		Swing	−6.3	

Labor MP Eric Bedford resigned.

==== 1984 ====
1984 New South Wales state election: Cabramatta
Party	Candidate	Votes	%	±%
Labor	Eric Bedford	19,159	65.1	−8.9
Liberal	Maria Heggie	10,289	34.9	+8.9
Total formal votes		29,448	95.8	+0.8
Informal votes		1,286	4.2	−0.8
Turnout		30,734	91.8	+1.9
Labor hold		Swing	−8.9	

==== 1981 ====
1981 New South Wales state election: Cabramatta
Party	Candidate	Votes	%	±%
Labor	Eric Bedford	19,137	74.0	−4.2
Liberal	Kerry Chikarovski	6,725	26.0	+4.2
Total formal votes		25,862	95.0	
Informal votes		1,367	5.0	
Turnout		27,229	89.9	
Labor notional hold		Swing	−4.2	
