= 2024 Fairfield City Council election =

- 14 September 2024

All 13 seats on Fairfield City Council 7 seats needed for a majority
- Mayor
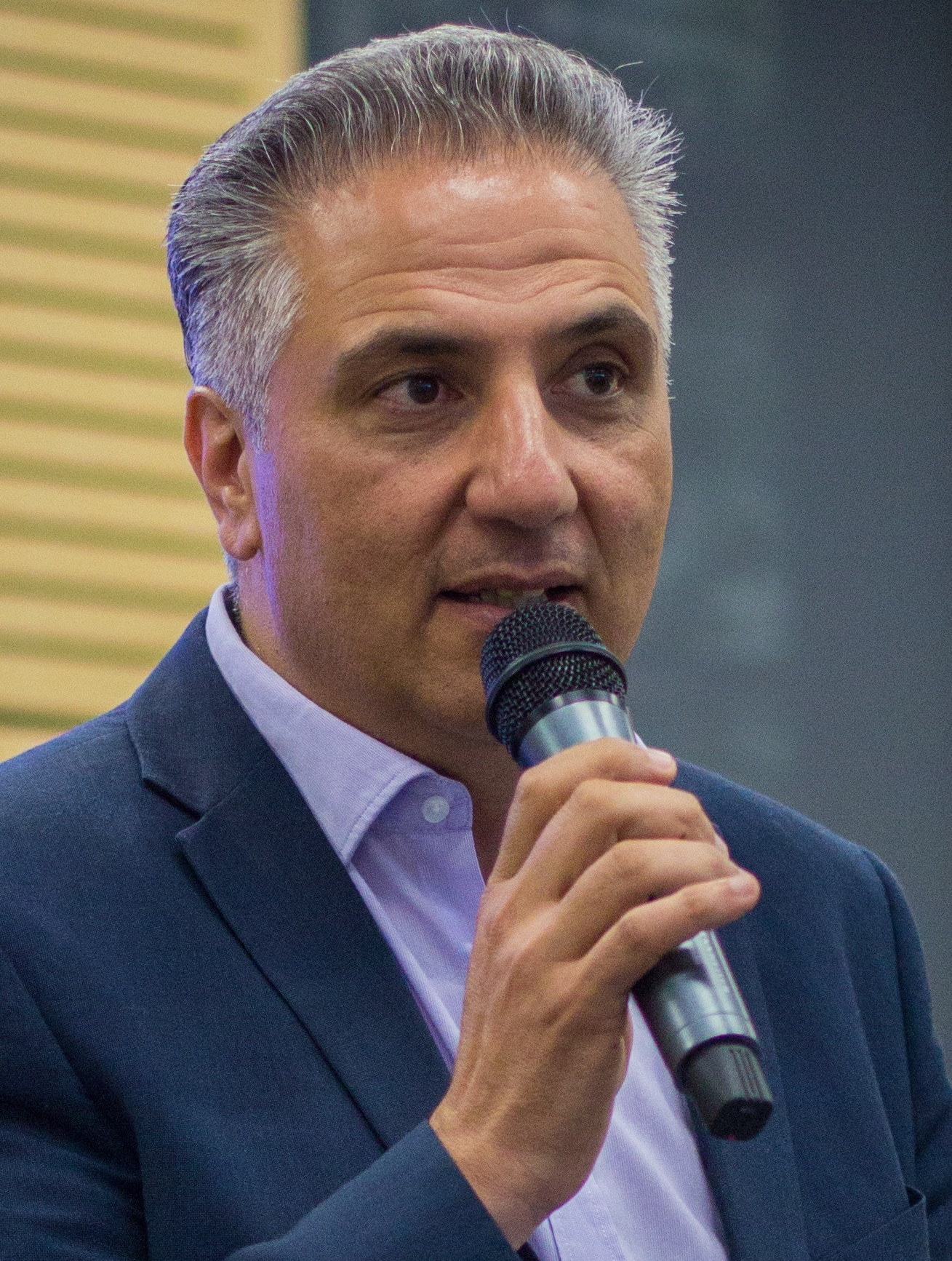

	First party	Second party
Candidate	Frank Carbone	Basim Shamaon
Party	Frank Carbone	Labor
Primary vote	89,562	20,512
Percentage	81.4%	18.6%
Swing	▲7.9	▼7.9
Mayor before election
Frank Carbone
Frank Carbone
Elected Mayor
Frank Carbone
Frank Carbone
- Councillors
Party	Leader	Vote %	Seats	+/–
Frank Carbone	Frank Carbone	44.1	6	0
Dai Le	Dai Le	29.5	3	0
Labor	Basim Shamaon	16.1	2	−1
Independents	—N/a	10.1	1	+1
This lists parties that won seats. See the complete results below.
Results by ward

The 2024 Fairfield City Council election was held on 14 September 2024 to elect a mayor and twelve councillors to the Fairfield City Council. The election was held as part of the statewide local government elections in New South Wales.

Frank Carbone was re-elected to a fourth term as mayor with 81.4% of the vote. The Carbone-Le Alliance retained its majority, while the Labor Party was reduced to two seats.

== Background ==
Fairfield, located in the west of Sydney, has often been considered a safe area for the Labor Party. In 2016, incumbent mayor Frank Carbone lost Labor preselection but was narrowly re-elected as an independent.

In 2021, Carbone was re-elected mayor in a landslide with 73.5% of the vote. At the same election, Carbone's eponymous ticket won six councillor positions, while another eponymous ticket led by Dai Le (also registered as the Australian Women's Party) won three seats.

Le was elected to the House of Representatives at the 2022 federal election after winning the Division of Fowler, becoming the first non-Labor MP to represent the seat. She continued serving as a Fairfield councillor.

== Electoral system ==
Like in all other New South Wales local government areas (LGAs), Fairfield City Council elections use optional preferential voting. Under this system, voters are only required to vote for one candidate or group, although they can choose to preference other candidates. Fairfield was one of 37 LGAs to have a direct mayoral election in 2024.

All elections for councillor positions are elected using proportional representation. Fairfield has an Australian Senate-style ballot paper with above-the-line and below-the-line voting. The council is divided into two wards, each electing six councillors.

Fairfield was one of two LGAs (the other being Liverpool) to use the Australian Election Company to conduct its election in 2024. This was possible because of legislation implemented by the O'Farrell Liberal–National government in 2011, which allowed councils to choose private election providers instead of the New South Wales Electoral Commission (NSWEC). Following the 2024 local elections, the Minns Labor government introduced legislation which would see the NSWEC conduct all local elections.

== Retiring councillors ==
=== Labor ===
- George Barcha (Parks)
- Carmen Lazar (Fairfield/Cabravale)

== Candidates ==
=== Mayoral candidates ===
Candidates are listed in the order they appeared on the ballot.

Party	Candidate	Background
Labor	Basim Shamaon	Candidate for Fairfield/Cabravale Ward in 2021
Frank Carbone	Frank Carbone	Fairfield mayor since 2012

=== Ward candidates ===
==== Fairfield/Cabravale ====
Independent (Group A)	Frank Carbone (Group B)	Independent (Group C)	Dai Le (Group D)	Labor (Group E)
1. Kate Hoang; 2. Tien Nguyen; 3. Minh Hoang; 4. David Cao; 5. Van Le; 6. Tony Nguyen	1. Charbel Saliba; 2. Sam Yousif; 3. Jennifer Shahin; 4. Helen Nguyen; 5. Gina Carbone; 6. Antonia Carbone	1. Nguyen Khang Phan; 2. Van Dong Pham; 3. Thanh Dan Huynh; 4. Duc Thang Tran; 5. Van Sai Truong; 6. Kim Khanh Vo	1. Dai Le; 2. Marie Rose Saliba; 3. Dennis Suro; 4. Leonie Le; 5. Emma Tran; 6. Ngoc My Tang	1. Kien Ly; 2. Stella Kina; 3. Mickey Ngo; 4. Michal Walczak; 5. Joseph Huan; 6. Ngoc Trinh

==== Parks ====
Frank Carbone (Group A)	Dai Le (Group B)	Labor (Group C)	Ungrouped
1. Frank Carbone; 2. Reni Barkho; 3. Hugo Morvillo; 4. Milovan Karajcic; 5. Michael Mijatovic; 6. Martina Hanna	1. Kevin Lam; 2. Andrew Rohan; 3. Marsha Kozlova-Gao; 4. Monica Falco; 5. Valentina Prkic; 6. Jose Luis Miranda Garcia	1. Ninos Khoshaba; 2. Basim Shamaon; 3. Peter Pavisic; 4. Abrahem Wannous; 5. Jarrod Hawkins; 6. Innocenta Janina Marc	Nathan Athavle (FFP); Huu Tam Luong (Ind)

== Campaign ==
Labor campaigned on "[wanting] a more secure and clean LGA for residents to live in, feel comfortable in their surroundings and be proud of the area they live in". Carbone said his focus was "cost of living pressures and making Fairfield a great place to live".

== Endorsements ==
List of endorsements at the 2024 Fairfield City Council election

Nathan Athavle (Family First)

- Armenian National Committee of Australia

== Results ==
=== Mayoral results ===
2024 Fairfield City Council election: Mayor
Party	Candidate	Votes	%	±%
Frank Carbone	Frank Carbone	89,562	81.4	+7.9
Labor	Basim Shamaon	20,512	18.6	−7.9
Total formal votes		110,074	95.1	
Informal votes		5,705	4.9	
Turnout		115,779		
Frank Carbone hold		Swing	+7.9	

=== Ward results ===
2024 Fairfield City Council election: Ward results
Party	Votes	%	Swing	Seats	Change
Frank Carbone	45,695	44.1	+1.6	6	Steady
Dai Le	29,455	29.5	+9.3	3	Steady
Labor	16,160	16.1	−8.8	2	▼1
Independents	10,231	10.1	+6.9	1	▲1
Family First	216	0.2		0	Steady
Formal votes	101,757	88.1			
Informal votes	13,722	11.9			
Turnout	115,479				

=== Fairfield/Cabravale ===
2024 Fairfield City Council election: Fairfield/Cabravale Ward
Party	Candidate	Votes	%	±%
Dai Le	1. Dai Le (elected 1); 2. Marie Rose Saliba (elected 4); 3. Dennis Suro; 4. Leonie Le; 5. Emma Tran; 6. Ngoc My Tang	16,975	34.6	+7.1
Frank Carbone	1. Charbel Saliba (elected 2); 2. Sam Yousif (elected 5); 3. Jennifer Shahin; 4. Helen Nguyen; 5. Gina Carbone; 6. Antonia Carbone	13,830	28.2	−3.3
Labor	1. Kien Ly (elected 3); 2. Stella Kina; 3. Mickey Ngo; 4. Michal Walczak; 5. Joseph Huan; 6. Ngoc Trinh	8,036	16.4	−10.6
Independent	1. Kate Hoang (elected 6); 2. Tien Nguyen; 3. Minh Hoang; 4. David Cao; 5. Van Le; 6. Tony Nguyen	6,018	12.3	+12.3
Independent	1. Nguyen Khang Phan; 2. Van Dong Pham; 3. Thanh Dan Huynh; 4. Duc Thang Tran; 5. Van Sai Truong; 6. Kim Khanh Vo	4,136	8.4	+8.4
Total formal votes		48,995	88.2	
Informal votes		6,571	11.8	
Turnout		55,566		

=== Parks ===
2024 Fairfield City Council election: Parks Ward
Party	Candidate	Votes	%	±%
Frank Carbone	1. Frank Carbone; 2. Reni Barkho (elected 1); 3. Hugo Morvillo (elected 4); 4. Milovan Karajcic (elected 5); 5. Michael Mijatovic (elected 6); 6. Martina Hanna	31,865	60.4	+6.5
Dai Le	1. Kevin Lam (elected 2); 2. Andrew Rohan; 3. Marsha Kozlova-Gao; 4. Monica Falco; 5. Valentina Prkic; 6. Jose Luis Miranda Garcia	12,480	23.6	+11.0
Labor	1. Ninos Khoshaba (elected 3); 2. Basim Shamaon; 3. Peter Pavisic; 4. Abrahem Wannous; 5. Jarrod Hawkins; 6. Inocenta Janina Marc	8,124	15.4	−7.2
Family First	Nathan Athavle	216	0.4	
Independent	Huu Tam Luong	77	0.2	
Total formal votes		52,762	88.1	
Informal votes		7,151	11.9	
Turnout		59,913		
