= 2008 Cabramatta state by-election =

- 18 October 2008

Electoral district of Cabramatta in the New South Wales Legislative Assembly
- Registered: 50,383
- Turnout: 86.05% (▼6.53)
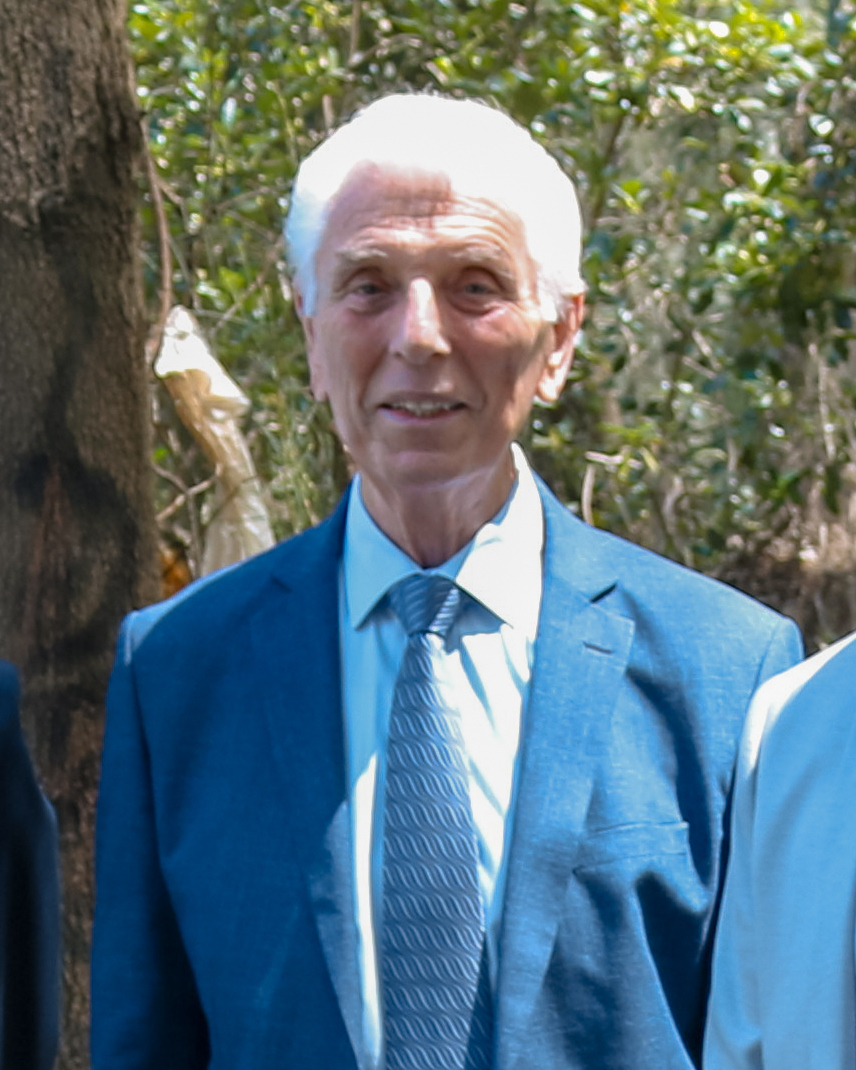

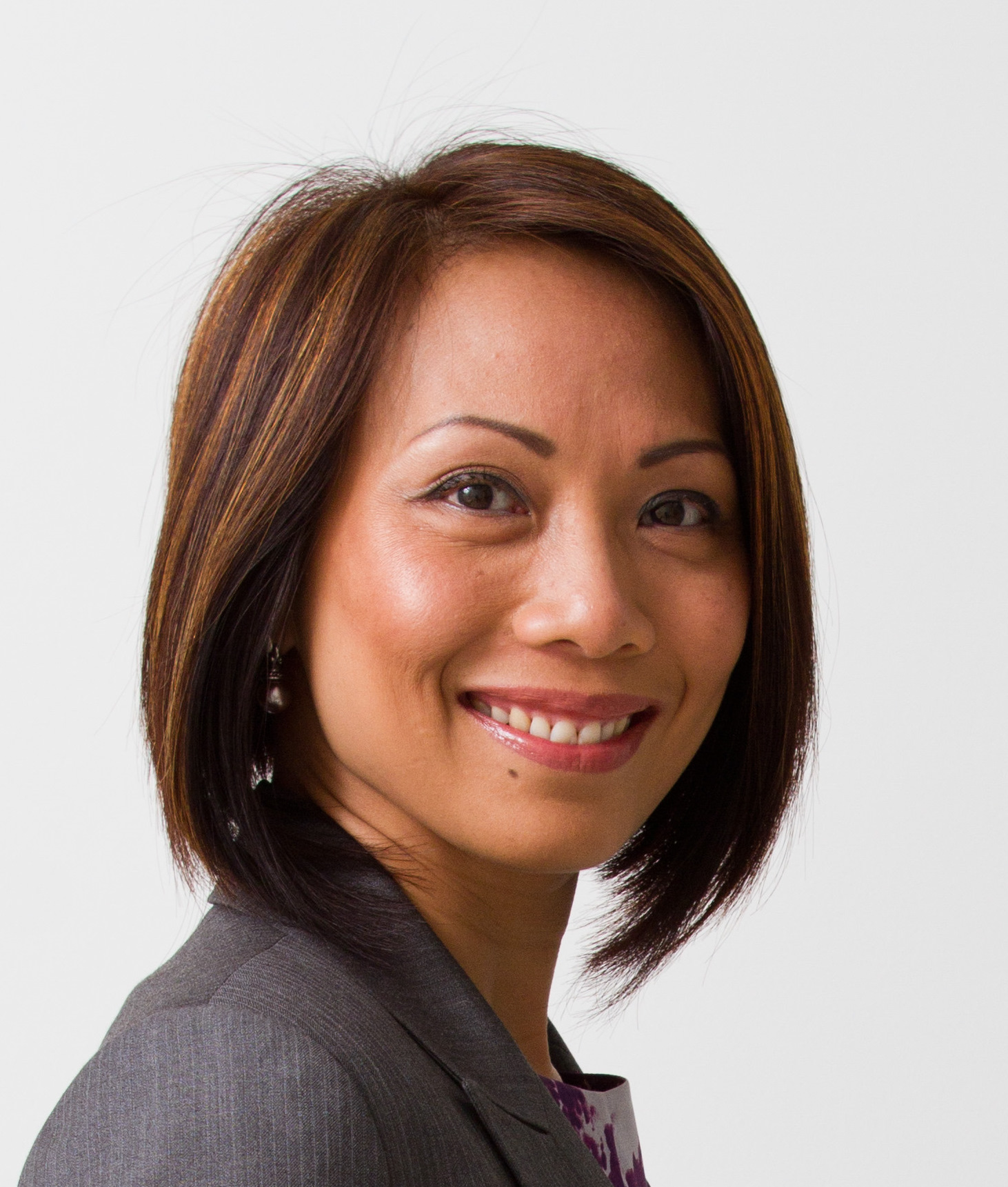
	First party	Second party
Candidate	Nick Lalich	Dai Le
Party	Labor	Liberal
Primary vote	21,423	15,347
Percentage	50.96%	36.51%
Swing	▼18.11	▲20.18
TPP	57.22%	42.78%
TPP swing	▼21.82	▲21.82
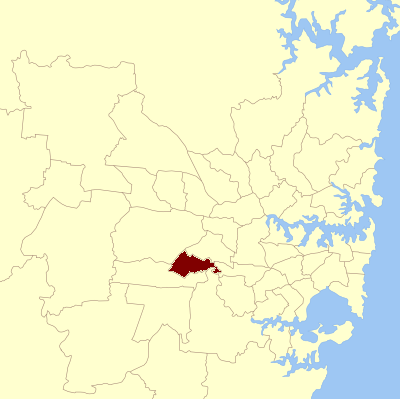
- Location of the electoral district of Cabramatta
MP before election
Reba Meagher
Labor
Elected MP
Nick Lalich
Labor

The 2008 Cabramatta state by-election was held on 18 October 2008 to elect the member for Cabramatta in the New South Wales Legislative Assembly, following the resignation of Labor Party MP Reba Meagher. It took place alongside by-elections in Lakemba, Port Macquarie and Ryde.

The seat was retained by Labor at the by-election despite a swing against the party, which lost more than 18% of the primary vote and more than 21% of the two-party-preferred vote compared to the 2007 state election.

== Candidates ==
Candidates are listed in the order they appeared on the ballot.

Party	Candidate	Background
Greens	Lindsay Langlands	Candidate for Fairfield City Council in September 2008
Business	Joseph Adams	President of the Australian Business Party
Liberal	Dai Le	Australian Broadcasting Corporation journalist
Labor	Nick Lalich	Mayor of Fairfield
Communist League	Alasdair Macdonald	Candidate for Marrickville in 2005
Christian Democrats	Doug Morrison	Candidate for Parramatta in 2007

== Results ==
2008 Cabramatta state by-election
Party	Candidate	Votes	%	±%
Labor	Nick Lalich	21,423	50.96	−18.11
Liberal	Dai Le	15,347	36.51	+20.18
Greens	Lindsay Langlands	3,775	8.98	+2.09
Christian Democrats	Doug Morrison	673	1.60	+1.60
Business	Joseph Adams	650	1.55	+1.55
Communist League	Alasdair Macdonald	168	0.40	+0.40
Total formal votes		42,036	96.95	+0.87
Informal votes		1,321	3.05	−0.87
Turnout		43,357	86.05	−6.53
Two-party-preferred result
Labor	Nick Lalich	21,933	57.22	−21.82
Liberal	Dai Le	16,396	42.78	+21.82
Labor hold		Swing	−21.82	

== See also ==
- Electoral results for the district of Cabramatta
