= 1994 Cabramatta state by-election =

- 22 October 1994

Electoral district of Cabramatta in the New South Wales Legislative Assembly
	First party	Second party
		IND
Candidate	Reba Meagher	Nghiep Nguyen
Party	Labor	Independent
Primary vote	22,701	3,646
Percentage	72.65%	11.67%
Swing	▲21.00	▲11.67
TCP	83.94%	16.06%
TCP swing	▲17.94	▲16.06
MP before election
John Newman
Labor
Elected MP
Reba Meagher
Labor

A by-election was held in the state electoral district of Cabramatta on 22 October 1994. The by-election was triggered by the murder of anti-drugs and anti-crime campaigner John Newman (Labor). The election was held only five months before the 1995 election.

== Dates ==
Date	Event
5 September 1994	Death of John Newman.
19 September 1994	Writ of election issued by the Speaker of the Legislative Assembly and close of electoral rolls.
28 September 1994	Day of nomination
22 October 1994	Polling day
11 November 1994	Return of writ

== Results ==
1994 Cabramatta by-election Saturday 22 October
Party	Candidate	Votes	%	±%
Labor	Reba Meagher	22,701	72.65	+21.00
Independent	Nghiep Nguyen	3,646	11.67	
Call to Australia	Brian Grigg	1,498	4.79	
Independent	Chris Moore	1,361	4.36	
Daylight Saving Extension	Tony de Govrik	865	2.77	
Independent	Mark Stevens	680	2.18	
No Party Affiliation	Ted Oldfield	497	1.59	
Total formal votes		27,172	95.11	
Informal votes		1,398	4.89	
Turnout		28,570	76.97	
Two-candidate-preferred result
Labor	Reba Meagher	24,367	83.94	+17.94
Independent	Nghiep Nguyen	4,663	16.06	+16.06
Labor hold				

The Liberal Party did not nominate a candidate.

== See also ==
- Electoral results for the district of Cabramatta
- List of New South Wales state by-elections
