= List of mayors of Liverpool =

List of mayors of Liverpool may refer to:

- List of mayors of the Liverpool City Region in Britain
  - List of mayors of Liverpool (2012-2023)
  - List of Lord Mayors of Liverpool (historical position, ceremonial since 2012)
- List of mayors of Liverpool (New South Wales) in Australia
