= 2024 Liverpool City Council (Australia) election =

2024 Liverpool City Council election
- 14 September 2024

All 11 seats on Liverpool City Council 6 seats needed for a majority
- Mayor

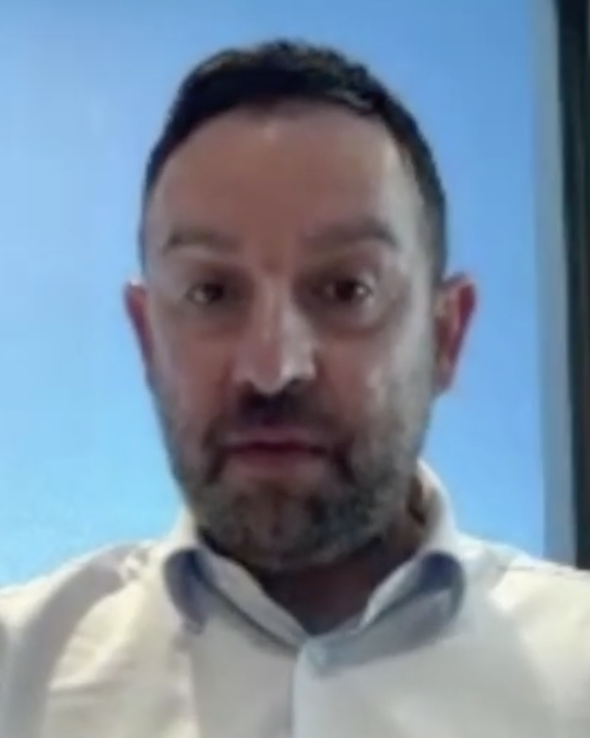
	First party	Second party	Third party
Candidate	Ned Mannoun	Betty Green	Peter Ristevski
Party	Liberal	Labor	OLC
Primary vote	49,384	30,019	10,959
Percentage	42.1%	25.6%	9.3%
Swing	▲0.3	▼12.5	▲9.3
After preferences	53.4%	32.9%	13.7%
Mayor before election
Ned Mannoun
Liberal
Elected Mayor
Ned Mannoun
Liberal
- Councillors
Party	Leader	Vote %	Seats	+/–
Liberal	Ned Mannoun	41.0	4	0
Labor	Betty Green	31.4	4	0
OLC	Peter Ristevski	8.7	1	+1
LCIT	Peter Harle	6.8	1	−1
This lists parties that won seats. See the complete results below.

The 2024 Liverpool City Council election was held on 14 September 2024 to elect a mayor and twelve councillors to the Liverpool City Council. The election was held as part of the statewide local government elections in New South Wales.

Incumbent mayor Ned Mannoun was re-elected against nine candidates. The Liberal Party and Labor Party both won four ward seats, while Our Local Community and the Liverpool Community Independents Team also won a single seat each.

== Background ==
In April 2022, South Ward councillor Karress Rhodes resigned from the Liverpool Community Independents Team.

== Electoral system ==
Like in all other New South Wales local government areas (LGAs), Liverpool City Council elections use optional preferential voting. Under this system, voters are only required to vote for one candidate or group, although they can choose to preference other candidates. Liverpool was one of 37 LGAs to have a direct mayoral election in 2024.

All elections for councillor positions are elected using proportional representation. Liverpool has an Australian Senate-style ballot paper with above-the-line and below-the-line voting. The council is divided into two wards, each electing five councillors.

Liverpool was one of two LGAs (the other being Fairfield) to use the Australian Election Company to conduct its election in 2024. This was possible because of legislation implemented by the O'Farrell Liberal–National government in 2011, which allowed councils to choose private election providers instead of the New South Wales Electoral Commission (NSWEC). Following the 2024 local elections, the Minns Labor government introduced legislation which would see the NSWEC conduct all local elections.

== Retiring councillors ==
=== Liberal ===
- Mazhar Hadid (North)

=== Labor ===
- Nathan Hagarty (North) – elected to parliament in 2023
- Charishma Kaliyanda (South) – elected to parliament in 2023
- Ali Karnib (North)

== Candidates ==
=== Mayoral candidates ===
Candidates are listed in the order they appeared on the ballot.

Party	Candidate	Background
Libertarian	Gemma Noiosi	Candidate for Macquarie Fields at the 2023 state election
Independent	Michael Tierney	
Independent	Michael Andjelkovic	Candidate for Liverpool mayor in 2021
Liberal	Ned Mannoun	Mayor of Liverpool since 2021
Our Local Community	Peter Ristevski	Former Liberal councillor
Labor	Betty Green	Councillor for South Ward since 2021
Community Voice	Deb Gurung	Former British Army and ADF serviceman
Liverpool Independents	Karress Rhodes	Councillor for South Ward since 2016
Community Independents	Peter Harle	Councillor for North Ward since 2008
Independent	Robert Aiken	

=== Ward candidates ===
Liberal councillor Richard Ammoun switched from South Ward to North Ward at this election, while fellow Liberal councillor Melhem Goodman contested the unwinnable fifth position on the South Ward ticket.

Rhodes led the "Liverpool Independents" ticket across both wards.

==== North ====
Liberal (Group A)	Labor (Group B)	LCIT (Group C)
1. Richard Ammoun; 2. Matthew Harte; 3. Milica Alavanja; 4. Jane Colley; 5. Wael Manoun	1. Sam Karnib; 2. Mira Ibrahim; 3. Chris Stanley; 4. Francis Mawule; 5. Kamellah Miankhel	1. Peter Harle; 2. Daniel Francis Kneipp; 3. Mikaela Conners; 4. Rayman Solagna; 5. Marc Connors
Libertarian (Group D)	Our Local Community (Group E)	Liverpool Inds (Group F)
1. Gemma Noiosi; 2. Caleb Cochrane; 3. Adam Osman; 4. Donald Brooke; 5. Jennilee Cochrane	1. Florina Nero; 2. Jay Matthews; 3. Dejana Miric; 4. Bruce Missen; 5. Charlie Ristevski	1. Tony Estephen; 2. Lela Panich; 3. Christopher Sparrow; 4. Eric North; 5. Diane Wills

==== South ====
Libertarian (Group A)	Our Local Community (Group B)	Community Voice (Group C)	Labor (Group D)	Independent (Group E)
1. Victor Tey; 2. Peter Runge; 3. Anthony Noiosi; 4. Carmel Corigliano; 5. John Breakspear	1. Peter Ristevski; 2. Dhurgham Al-Sulaimawi; 3. Shalini Nadan; 4. Sonia Hussein; 5. Mary Ristevski	1. Deb Gurung; 2. Fia Pesa; 3. Afzal Chowdhury; 4. Bhabana Parajuli Bastakoti; 5. Bijay Shrestha	1. Betty Green; 2. Ethan Monaghan; 3. Mohan Dev Bhatt; 4. Alaa Ahmad; 5. Rajesh Kumar	1. Michael Tierney; 2. Alice Tierney; 3. Emily-Claire Khemananta
Liberal (Group F)	LCIT (Group G)	Liverpool Inds (Group H)	Ungrouped	
1. Ned Mannoun; 2. Fiona Macnaught; 3. Emmanuel Adjei; 4. Sid Shaheed; 5. Melhem Goodman	1. Criss Moore; 2. Susie Kneipp; 3. June Young; 4. Michael Russell; 5. Kevin James Moore	1. Karress Rhodes; 2. Tarkan Fahri; 3. Carla Filipakis; 4. Robert Kadir; 5. Jody Reeks	Michael Andjelkovic (Ind); Margarida Boa Morte (Ind)	

== Results ==
=== Mayoral results ===
2024 Liverpool City Council election: Mayor
Party	Candidate	Votes	%	±%
Liberal	Ned Mannoun	49,384	42.1	+0.3
Labor	Betty Green	30,019	25.6	−12.5
Our Local Community	Peter Ristevski	10,959	9.3	+9.3
Libertarian	Gemma Noiosi	8,809	7.5	+7.5
Independent	Michael Andjelkovic	4,819	4.1	−4.4
Community Independents	Peter Harle	4,280	3.6	−3.6
Community Voice	Deb Gurung	3,203	2.7	+2.7
Liverpool Independents	Karress Rhodes	2,664	2.3	+2.3
Independent	Michael Tierney	2,472	2.1	+2.1
Independent	Robert Aiken	773	0.7	+0.7
Total formal votes		117,382	91.5	−4.0
Informal votes		9,931	8.5	+4.0
Turnout		127,313		
After distribution of preferences
Liberal	Ned Mannoun	52,369	53.4	
Labor	Betty Green	32,235	32.9	
Our Local Community	Peter Ristevski	13,469	13.7	
Liberal hold				

=== Ward results ===
2024 Liverpool City Council election: Ward results
Party	Votes	%	Swing	Seats	Change
Liberal	45,796	41.2	+2.8	4	Steady
Labor	34,772	31.3	−6.8	4	Steady
Our Local Community	9,563	8.6	+8.6	1	▲1
Community Independents	7,529	6.8	−3.1	1	▼1
Libertarian	7,291	6.6	+6.6	0	Steady
Liverpool Independents	3,262	2.9	+2.9	0	Steady
Community Voice	2,055	1.8	+1.8	0	Steady
Independents	708	0.6	−6.2	0	Steady
Formal votes	110,976	87.1			
Informal votes	16,461	12.9			
Total	127,437	100.0		10	
Registered voters / turnout					

=== North ===
2024 Liverpool City Council election: North Ward
Party	Candidate	Votes	%	±%
Liberal	1. Richard Ammoun (elected 1); 2. Matthew Harte (elected 3); 3. Milica Alavanja; 4. Jane Colley; 5. Wael Manoun	22,152	42.4	
Labor	1. Sam Karnib (elected 2); 2. Mira Ibrahim (elected 4); 3. Chris Stanley; 4. Francis Mawule; 5. Kamellah Miankhel	17,049	32.7	
Community Independents	1. Peter Harle (elected 5); 2. Daniel Francis Kneipp; 3. Mikaela Conners; 4. Rayman Solagna; 5. Marc Connors	4,499	8.6	
Our Local Community	1. Florina Nero; 2. Jay Matthews; 3. Dejana Miric; 4. Bruce Missen; 5. Charlie Ristevski	4,041	7.7	
Libertarian	1. Gemma Noiosi; 2. Caleb Cochrane; 3. Adam Osman; 4. Donald Brooke; 5. Jennilee Cochrane	2,780	5.3	
Liverpool Independents	1. Tony Estephen; 2. Lela Panich; 3. Christopher Sparrow; 4. Eric North; 5. Diane Wills	1,674	3.2	
Total formal votes		52,195	87.0	−3.3
Informal votes		7,804	13.0	+3.3
Turnout		59,999		

=== South ===
2024 Liverpool City Council election: South Ward
Party	Candidate	Votes	%	±%
Liberal	1. Ned Mannoun; 2. Fiona Macnaught (elected 1); 3. Emmanuel Adjei (elected 3); 4. Sid Shaheed; 5. Melhem Goodman	23,644	40.2	
Labor	1. Betty Green (elected 2); 2. Ethan Monaghan (elected 4); 3. Mohan Dev Bhatt; 4. Alaa Ahmad; 5. Rajesh Kumar	17,723	30.1	
Our Local Community	1. Peter Ristevski (elected 5); 2. Dhurgham Al-Sulaimawi; 3. Shalini Nadan; 4. Sonia Hussein; 5. Mary Ristevski	5,522	9.4	
Libertarian	1. Victor Tey; 2. Peter Runge; 3. Anthony Noiosi; 4. Carmel Corigliano; 5. John Breakspear	4,511	7.7	
Community Independents	1. Criss Moore; 2. Susie Kneipp; 3. June Young; 4. Michael Russell; 5. Kevin James Moore	3,030	5.1	
Community Voice	1. Deb Gurung; 2. Fia Pesa; 3. Afzal Chowdhury; 4. Bhabana Parajuli Bastakoti; 5. Bijay Shrestha	2,055	3.5	
Liverpool Independents	1. Karress Rhodes; 2. Tarkan Fahri; 3. Carla Filipakis; 4. Robert Kadir; 5. Jody Reeks	1,588	2.7	
Independent	Michael Andjelkovic	497	0.8	
Independent	1. Michael Tierney; 2. Alice Tierney; 3. Emily-Claire Khemananta	196	0.3	
Independent	Margarida Boa Morte	15	0.0	
Total formal votes		58,781	87.2	
Informal votes		8,657	12.8	
Turnout		67,438		
