= Phuong Ngo =

Vietnamese murderer, former businessman, and politician

Phuong Canh Ngo
- Born: 1958 (age 67–68); South Vietnam
- Occupations: Businessman, politician
- Status: Incarcerated
- Motive: Political gain
- Conviction: Murder
- Penalty: Life sentence without the possibility of parole

Deputy Mayor of Fairfield
- In office September 1990 – September 1991
- Mayor: Lawrence Wright

Alderman of Fairfield City Council for Cabramatta Ward
- In office 26 September 1987 – 30 June 1993

Councillor of Fairfield City Council for Cabramatta Ward
- In office 1 July 1993 – March 1998

Personal details
- Party: Independent (1987–1993); Australian Labor Party (1993–1998)

Phuong Canh Ngo (Vietnamese: Ngô Cảnh Phương, Vietnamese pronunciation: [ŋow˧˧ kan˨˩˦ fɨəŋ˧˧]; born 1958) is an Australian former businessman and politician who was convicted of ordering the assassination of Australian MP John Newman on 5 September 1994.

== Biography ==
Phuong Ngo was born in South Vietnam to wealthy parents and following university became a schoolteacher. Following the fall of Saigon and the end of the Vietnam War, his family had their assets confiscated. Ngo made several unsuccessful attempts to flee the country and was jailed several times. In January 1981, he made his thirteenth attempt, which was successful, and he arrived in Australia via Malaysia as a refugee in 1982.

Ngo rose rapidly in local politics. On 26 September 1987, he was elected to the Cabramatta Ward of Fairfield City Council, New South Wales, making him the first Vietnamese-born Australian to enter local government; on his election, Ngo expressed to The Sydney Morning Herald: "I think we are welcome here. But we need a mutual understanding. Most people I talked to said we needed a Vietnamese on the council." The following year he partnered Rodney Adler to set up Asia Press Pty Ltd, which published Dan Viet, a Vietnamese language newspaper. As a city councillor, Ngo worked to help members of the Vietnamese Australian community and, after arranging for Adler to invest $1 million, led the redevelopment of the local community centre, the Mekong Club. He was subsequently asked to be the club's president. From July 1990 to June 1993, Ngo served as a Commissioner of the NSW Ethnic Affairs Commission. In 1990, he was elected deputy mayor of Fairfield. The following year, Ngo was re-elected to Fairfield City Council at the September 1991 election and stood as an independent for the seat of Cabramatta in the May 1991 state election, which he lost to Labor's John Newman.

After his friend and council ally, Nick Lalich, approached Federal MP Ted Grace for Ngo to join Labor, Grace arranged a meeting with Senator Graham Richardson and Leo McLeay, Federal MP for Watson and Speaker of the House of Representatives. They decided that if Ngo was promoted to the Legislative Council (MLC), he could be a potential "counter" to the Liberal Party's Asian MLC Helen Sham-Ho. Ngo was invited to join Labor and run the party's re-activated Canley Vale branch. This put him in direct competition with Newman, who ran the Canley Heights branch, despite previously agreeing not to challenge Newman for preselection.

== Political conflict ==
Newman had been elected to the Fairfield council in 1977 and was known for his campaigns against Asian criminal gangs that were then a problem. Newman suspected Ngo took part in criminal dealings due to his involvement with the Mekong Club, which many believed to be laundering money for the Cabramatta gangs.

In 1990, the local Fairfield Champion newspaper published an article regarding a proposal to add an inscription commemorating the Chinese Communist Revolution to the Pai Lau gate (Freedom Gate) in Cabramatta's Freedom Square. Ngo, then deputy mayor of Fairfield and an ardent anti-communist, blamed Newman for the proposal and sued the newspaper. The case was settled out of court. In 1991, Ngo stood as an independent for the seat of Cabramatta and Newman, who was the sitting member, issued a press release questioning Ngo's refugee status. Ngo received only 11.7% of the vote, a result he blamed on his being Asian.

Following the election, Ngo joined Labor with the help of the Labor Right, led by Grace and his new Canley Vale branch, now directly competing with the Newman's Canley Heights branch. Ngo and Newman vied for new members, which led to considerable infighting over branch stacking. The ALP general secretary, John Della Bosca, arranged a meeting to resolve the dispute, during which Ngo agreed not to challenge Newman for pre-selection in exchange for Newman not challenging the credentials of members who joined Ngo's branch. At this time Newman was being targeted: his car had been paint bombed three times and he was receiving death threats. Publicly he blamed a gang, but privately he confided in acquaintances that he believed it was Ngo "and that gang of hooligans" at the Mekong Club.

In 1994, Fairfield wanted a sister city. Ngo advocated a city from Taiwan, which was endorsed by councillors Lalich and Anwar Khoshaba; Newman, in line with official party policy, pushed for a city in China. A Taiwan relationship was against Australian Federal government policy, as Taiwan was not diplomatically recognised as a nation. According to former Cabramatta detective Tim Priest, Ngo had received a $117,000 cheque from Jin-Gou Chang of the Taipei Cultural Office in 1994. Newman learned of the transaction and accused Ngo, Lalich and Khoshaba of accepting funding from the Taiwanese government and stated that they should not be re-elected to the council, a position for which he received considerable support. The Hsinchu City sister city relationship was accepted despite only 100 Cabramatta citizens having Taiwanese ancestry. On 1 June, the Labor State Electoral Council condemned Ngo and Lalich, stating that if they continued to breach Labor policy regarding China, they would both be expelled. Ngo was furious and began openly approaching people who were not criminals for advice on acquiring guns and hiring a hitman.

== Assassination of John Newman ==
John Newman, member of the New South Wales Legislative Assembly, was shot dead on 5 September 1994. Within days, the leader of a gang, 19-year-old Tri Minh Tran, became the prime suspect. Ngo's conflict with Newman and his close ties to Tran led to widespread rumours in the community that he was involved which were repeated by the media. Ngo became the focus of police attention after one of Tran's relatives made a statement to police that he had rejected an offer of $10,000 from Ngo to kill Newman. The case against Ngo was weak and, after Ngo provided information to police that led to the arrest of the informant, the task force investigating the Newman murder was disbanded.

It was not the first murder of a parliamentarian. In 1921 another Labor MP in the NSW Legislative Assembly, Percy Brookfield, was slain in Riverton, by a psychotic man.

== Trial ==
Ngo was arrested for Newman's murder on 13 March 1998, and following two mistrials, a Coronial Inquest, three Supreme Court trials and a Judicial Inquiry. After seven years since Newman’s death, he was found guilty and was convicted by a jury on 29 June 2001. He was sentenced to life in prison without the possibility of parole.

== Aftermath ==
In June 2003, evidence was found that Ngo was a member of the W2K (Willing To Kill) prison gang, leading to his transfer to the Goulburn Correctional Centre, a supermax prison. The High Court of Australia refused special leave to hear an appeal in May 2004. Two of Ngo's co-accused conspirators, David Dinh and Tu Quang Dao were acquitted by the same jury. The identity of the shooter and the getaway driver remains unknown.

A number of Ngo's supporters have stated that he was convicted on flimsy evidence. He was a prominent leader in the Vietnamese Catholic community, which held prayer services for him in the hope that he would be acquitted of the murder. However, almost 300 leaders in the Vietnamese community signed a petition to the Supreme Court requesting that Ngo be denied bail.

In an enquiry after Newman's death, but prior to charges being laid, evidence was heard that Newman considered the Mekong Club to be a "gambling den". The prosecution in Ngo's case claimed that Ngo and Newman were political rivals who competed for the same seat in Parliament. However, senior Labor figures, including Bosca, swore on oath that Ngo was not interested in Newman's seat but rather in a seat in the Legislative Council.

In April 2005, China sponsored five Fairfield Council members to visit the country in order to improve the relationship that had deteriorated due to Ngo's support of Taiwan.

An inquiry was launched into Ngo's conviction on 6 June 2008, by order of Chief Justice James Spigelman of the New South Wales Supreme Court. The inquiry was overseen by former and Acting District Court judge, David Patten, and addressed several concerns raised as to the validity of the original conviction. On 17 April 2009, Patten ruled that the original conviction was sound.

Following the inquiry, calls were made to have Ngo's name removed from monuments in Cabramatta. A former mayor and friend of Newman, Ken Chapman, claimed that this was unlikely to happen as Ngo had supporters on the council who had visited him in jail. Calls for the council to name a landmark in honour of Newman have not proceeded so far, although a swimming pool in Prairiewood bears his name.

== See also ==
- Murder of George Duncan
