= 1986 Cabramatta state by-election =

Election result for Cabramatta, New South Wales, Australia

A by-election was held in the state electoral district of Cabramatta on 1 February 1986. The by-election was triggered by the resignation of Labor MP Eric Bedford, who had served as Minister for Education and Minister for Planning in the Wran Labor government.

By-elections for the seats of Canterbury and Kiama were held on the same day.

== Results ==
1986 Cabramatta by-election Saturday 1 February
| Party | Candidate | Votes | % | ±% |
|---|---|---|---|---|
| Labor | John Newman | 13,411 | 49.36 | −15.7 |
| Liberal | Maria Heggie | 9,020 | 33.20 | −1.7 |
| Nuclear Disarmament | Virginia Rigney | 1,735 | 6.39 | |
| Call to Australia | Alan Byers | 1,408 | 5.18 | |
| Democrats | Robert Neesam | 1,257 | 4.63 | |
| Independent | Stephen Biscoe | 276 | 1.02 | |
| Small Business and Enterprise Party | Kusala Fitzroy-Mendis | 65 | 0.24 | |
| Total formal votes | | 27,172 | 95.11 | |
| Informal votes | | 1,398 | 4.89 | |
| Turnout | | 28,570 | 76.97 | |
Two-party-preferred result
| Labor | John Newman | | 58.8 | |
| Liberal | Maria Heggie | | 41.2 | |
| Labor hold | | Swing | −6.3 | |

Labor MP Eric Bedford resigned.

== See also ==
- Electoral results for the district of Cabramatta
- List of New South Wales state by-elections
