= Frank Carbone (politician) =

Australian politician (born 1970)

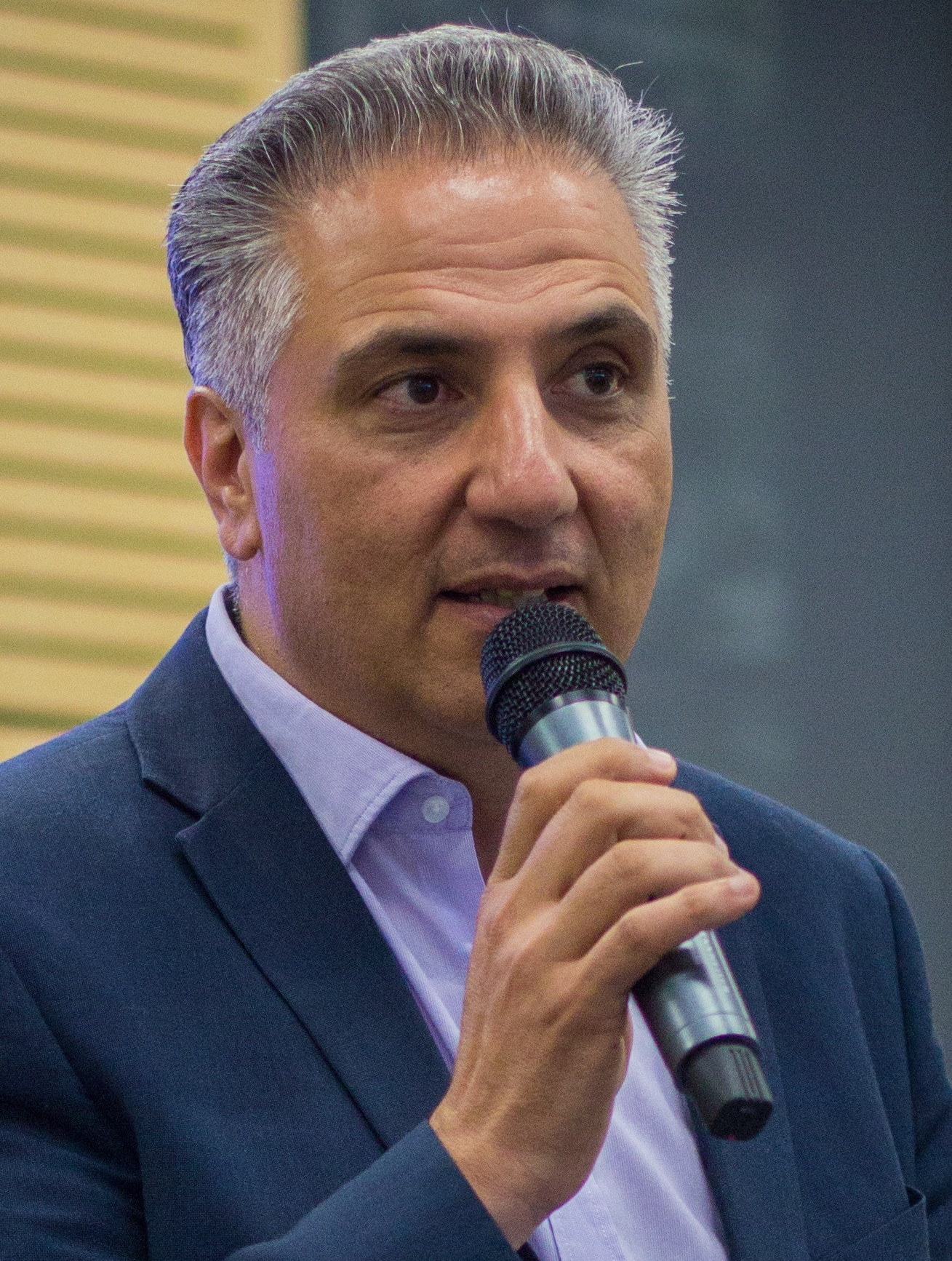

Mayor of Fairfield
- Incumbent
- Assumed office 21 March 2012
- Preceded by: Nick Lalich

Councillor of the Fairfield City Council for Fairfield Ward
- In office 13 September 2008 – 8 September 2012
- Preceded by: Robert Watkins
- Succeeded by: Charbel Saliba

Personal details
- Born: Francesco Giuseppe Carbone; 26 March 1970 (age 56) Prairiewood, New South Wales, Australia
- Party: Western Sydney Community (since 2023)
- Other political affiliations: Independent (2016–2023); Labor (until 2016)
- Children: 2
- Occupation: Businessman; Politician
- Website: mayorfrankcarbone.com.au

Francesco Giuseppe Carbone (born 26 March 1970) is an Australian politician. He has served as mayor of Fairfield in New South Wales since 2012.

Prior to being elected mayor, he served as a councillor for the Fairfield Ward between 2008 and 2012.

Carbone has been re-elected as mayor in 2016, and 2021 NSW local government elections.

== Early life ==
Carbone was born at Fairfield Hospital on 26 March 1970. He attended Harrington Street Public School in Cabramatta West, and later Bonnyrigg High School, where he completed his Higher School Certificate.

Prior to entering politics, Carbone owned and operated a jewellery business in Canley Heights with his brother Pasquale.

== Political career ==
In 2008, Carbone was preselected by the Labor Party to stand on their ticket in the Fairfield Ward for the NSW local government election held on 13 September. During his first term on the Fairfield City Council, Carbone attracted media attention when it was revealed that part of a public park in Canley Vale would be rezoned and turned into a cul-de-sac to serve a number of residential and commercial properties in which he and his brother owned shares.

Owing to changes in NSW Government legislation, preventing state parliamentarians serving on local councils, former mayor Nick Lalich announced his intention to step down from Fairfield City Council to focus his efforts on being MP for Cabramatta. That allowed Carbone to become mayor of Fairfield City on 21 March 2012.

Six months later, at the 2012 NSW local government elections, Carbone was elected mayor with 71.3% of the vote after preferences. During his first term as mayor, Carbone oversaw major projects, including the Fairfield Showground redevelopment, Fairfield Adventure Park, Aquatopia Water Park, and the Fairfield Youth and Community Centre.

Leading up to the 2016 NSW local government elections, Carbone came under pressure from colleagues in the Labor Party, with state parliamentarians Nick Lalich (Cabramatta MP), Hugh McDermott (Prospect MP) and Guy Zangari (Fairfield MP) writing to ALP head office asking that Carbone be disendorsed, claiming that his property interests conflicted with his civic duties. Carbone was cleared by a candidate review panel, but the Labor Party still decided to dump him as its mayoral candidate for Fairfield City, opting instead for Lalich's partner, Del Bennett, which led to Carbone standing for mayor without ALP endorsement. His decision to stand as an independent saw him expelled from the Labor Party for running against their endorsed candidate.

During the 2016 mayoral election, Carbone found an ally in former Liberal Party member Dai Le, who had also been suspended from her party over standing against endorsed candidates. The combined Carbone–Le independent ticket also ran candidates in all Fairfield City Council wards and appealed to disenfranchised voters.

Carbone was ultimately successful in retaining mayoralty of the City of Fairfield and becoming the first popularly elected independent mayor in Fairfield's history, claiming victory over Labor's Del Bennett by just 135 votes. A recount was ordered by the returning officer which increased Carbone's margin of victory to 233 votes.

Throughout Carbone's second term as mayor, he continued the transformation of Fairfield City, signing up to the Western Sydney City Deal between the Australian and NSW Governments, allowing the fast-tracking of projects such as the Fairfield Showground redevelopment, Deerbrush Park all-abilities playground, and Aquatopia Water Park upgrade.

During the COVID-19 pandemic, Carbone was vocal in opposing NSW Government restrictions, including curfews, mandatory 'surveillance testing', permits for authorized workers, and limiting exercise to one hour a day no more than 5 km from a person's home. The restrictions were applied to "LGAs of Concern", which initially included Canterbury-Bankstown, Fairfield, and Liverpool, but were later expanded to also include Bayside, Blacktown, Burwood, Campbelltown, Cumberland, Georges River, Parramatta, and Strathfield). During that period, Carbone and other mayors regularly locked horns with NSW Premier Gladys Berejiklian over her handling of restrictions for their communities, given that Sydney's affluent eastern and northern suburbs came under a separate set of rules, which prompted accusations of a double standard designed to segregate Sydney.

At the 2021 NSW local government elections, Carbone was re-elected mayor with 73.5% of the vote. He also teamed up again with Dai Le fielding candidates in all Fairfield City Council wards, and between them their team won 10 of the available 12 seats on Fairfield City Council.

In 2022, Carbone flirted with the idea of running for the federal electorate of Fowler against Labor frontbencher Kristina Keneally. Ultimately he did not stand for election but instead supported his Deputy Mayor Dai Le, who went on to win the seat with a swing of 16%, becoming the first refugee and Vietnamese Australian to be elected to the Australian House of Representatives.

At the 2024 NSW local government elections, Carbone was re-elected mayor with a 10% swing capturing 81.4% of the vote.

== Personal life ==
Carbone is married to Gina and has two children.

Civic offices
| Preceded by Nick Lalich | Mayor of Fairfield; 2012–present | Incumbent |
