= Western Sydney Community =

Western Sydney Community Dai Le & Frank Carbone W.S.C.
- Abbreviation: WSC
- Founders: Dai Le; Frank Carbone
- Founded: 8 May 2023; 3 years ago
- Registered: 8 August 2023; 3 years ago
- Headquarters: Canley Vale, New South Wales, Australia
- Ideology: Western Sydney localism
- Colours: Pink
- House of Representatives (Note: Le continues to sit as an independent despite being a member of the party.): 1 / 47 (NSW seats)
- Senate: 0 / 12 (NSW seats)
- Fairfield City Council: 10 / 13

Western Sydney Community (WSC), officially known as Dai Le & Frank Carbone W.S.C., is an Australian political party founded in 2023 by independent MP Dai Le and Fairfield mayor Frank Carbone. The party had planned to contest electorates in the Greater Western Sydney region at the 2025 federal election. However, this did not eventuate.

The party was known as the Dai Le & Frank Carbone Network (DLFCN) from its formation in May 2023 until July 2024. Before its establishment, Carbone said that he thought of naming the party "A Western Voice".

== History ==
=== Formation ===
Le was formerly a member of the New South Wales Liberal Party until 2016, when she was suspended for 10 years by the party for running against the endorsed liberal candidate for Mayor of Fairfield City, Joe Molluso. She was elected as a federal Independent member for Fowler in 2022. She also formed the Australian Women's Party in 2019. As of July 2024, Le is also concurrently a councillor of Fairfield City Council, having been first elected in 2012.

Carbone was formerly a member of the New South Wales Labor Party until 2016. He was a Councillor of Fairfield City Council between 2008 and 2012, before he was popularly elected as Mayor and has served in this position ever since. Like Le, he was also expelled from his party, for running against their endorsed candidate in the local election.

The party's federal registration was approved by the Australian Electoral Commission (AEC) on 8 August 2023, with the abbreviation "Frank Carbone".

=== Name change ===
On 3 July 2024, the party announced it would change its name to "Western Sydney Community". Two days later on 5 July, the party officially applied with the AEC to change its name to "Dai Le & Frank Carbone W.S.C.", proposing the abbreviation "Frank Carbone Western Sydney Community".

== Local government ==
Australian Women's Party
- Abbreviation: AWP; Dai Le
- Founder: Dai Le
- Founded: 29 April 2019
- Membership (2021): 200

Carbone and Le both have their own groups at Fairfield City Council elections, with Le forming a registered party (the Australian Women's Party, abbreviated on the ballot as "Dai Le") in April 2019. However, they have formed an alliance on council.

At the 2021 election, Frank Carbone's ticket received 42.5% of the vote and the Women's Party received 20.2% of the vote.

== Ideals ==
Since the party's founding, the ideals espoused by Le and Carbone have had an emphasis on the Western Sydney region, a majority Labor-aligned area. Le stated to the Guardian Australia in May, following the party's creation, "Our people... pay tolls and taxes, and yet the money doesn't come back into building services and infrastructure for our community, we need to come together and build a stronger western Sydney voice for our community." Further adding: "The end goal is to have representation for western Sydney, from people who are actually from western Sydney, live in western Sydney, understand the issues of western Sydney".

Party co-founder Frank Carbone, in an interview with Sydney's 2GB, said: "Ultimately we're here for the people in the western suburbs, and, you know, the western suburbs is one of the largest economies in Australia and we just feel that a lot more needs to be done to actually improve the quality of life of people who live out here..."
