= Tri Vo =

Australian politician

Tri Vo MP

Member of the New South Wales Assembly for Cabramatta
- Incumbent
- Assumed office 25 March 2023
- Preceded by: Nick Lalich

Personal details
- Party: Labor

Tri Dung Vo (Vietnamese: Võ Trí Dũng) is an Australian politician. He was elected a member of the New South Wales Legislative Assembly representing Cabramatta for the Labor Party in 2023.

== Career ==
A lawyer by profession, Vo was a Labor candidate for the Legislative Council at the 2019 New South Wales state election. He was not elected.

Vo gained 39 out of 61 votes in the Labor preselection for Cabramatta for the 2023 state election. He retained Cabramatta at the general election despite a 7.2-point swing away from Labor.

== Personal life ==
Vo is of Vietnamese descent. He lives in Wakeley with his wife and three children.
