= Nick Lalich =

Australian politician (1945–2025)

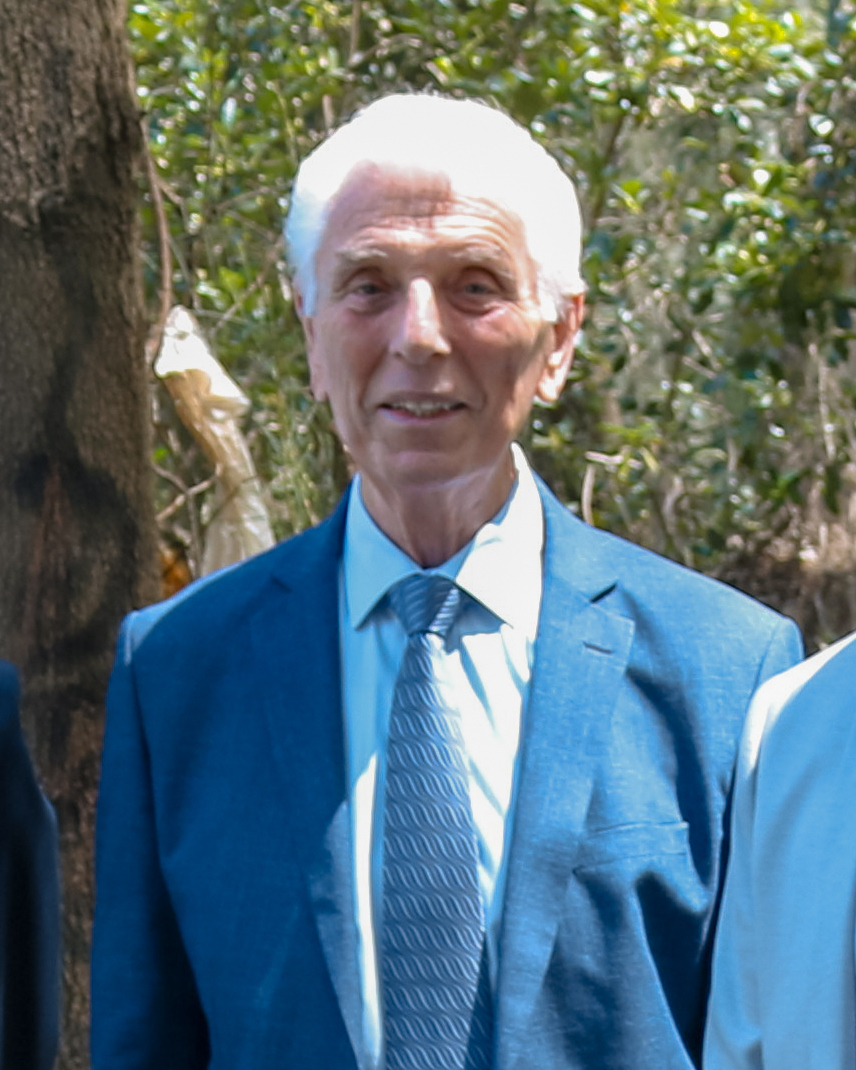

Member of the New South Wales Legislative Assembly for Cabramatta
- In office 18 October 2008 – 26 March 2023
- Preceded by: Reba Meagher
- Succeeded by: Tri Vo

Mayor of Fairfield
- In office September 2002 – 21 March 2012
- Preceded by: Anwar Khoshaba
- Succeeded by: Frank Carbone

Personal details
- Born: Nickola Lalich; 22 May 1945 El Shatt, Egypt
- Died: 26 March 2025 (aged 79) Sydney, New South Wales, Australia
- Party: Labor

Nickola "Nick" Lalich (22 May 1945 – 26 March 2025) was an Australian politician. He was a Labor Party member of the New South Wales Legislative Assembly from October 2008 until 26 March 2023, representing the electorate of Cabramatta. He also served as mayor of Fairfield from 2004 until March 2012.

== Early life and career ==
Lalich was born in the Kingdom of Egypt to refugee parents who had fled the war in Yugoslavia. His family migrated to Australia when he was three and spent time in resettlement camps at Uranquinty and Bonegilla. They eventually settled in the Bonnyrigg area, where Lalich's father worked for the Postmaster-General's Department and ran a farm.

Lalich remained in the Bonnyrigg area, where he worked as an electrician for Prospect Electricity before his election to the City of Fairfield council as a Labor candidate in 1987. He was elected by his colleagues as mayor in 1993–1994, and was a candidate for preselection for the seat of Cabramatta in 1994, losing to Reba Meagher. Lalich remained on council, was again elected mayor by his colleagues in 2002, and ran and won as the first popularly elected mayor of Fairfield in 2004. He was easily re-elected as mayor in late 2008, only weeks before his election to parliament in October 2008.

== Election to parliament ==
In September 2008, Reba Meagher, the embattled state Health Minister, resigned from politics after it became clear that she would likely be dumped from Cabinet in a forthcoming ministerial reshuffle. This resulted in a by-election for her seat, and Lalich, who had lost a preselection vote to her in 1994, was immediately touted as her replacement, duly winning preselection. He faced a strong challenge in the usually safe seat due to an unpopular government and a strong Liberal candidate in Australian Broadcasting Corporation journalist Dai Le, but withstood a 20-point swing against Labor to hold the seat for the party. Lalich was sworn in as a member of the Legislative Assembly on 18 October, and appointed to the Public Bodies Review Committee on 30 October. He also vowed to continue as Fairfield mayor in addition to his parliamentary responsibilities.

=== March 2011 election ===
Lalich was able to retain the seat of Cabramatta for the ALP at the March 2011 election against Dai Le, who failed previously at the 2008 by-election. Controversy arose when leaflets were distributed during the campaign, stating Le supported her colleague Chris Spence, the Liberal candidate for The Entrance and former leader of Pauline Hanson One Nation. Both sides campaigned heavily in the local area, with the Liberal Party taking an unprecedented interest in Cabramatta.

In early 2012, Lalich announced his intention to step down as Mayor of the City of Fairfield to focus his efforts on being MP for Cabramatta. This decision was made owing to changes in NSW Government legislation preventing state parliamentarians serving on local councils. This allowed Frank Carbone to become mayor of Fairfield City on 21 March 2012.

On 24 December 2022, Lalich announced that he would be retiring at the 2023 state election.

== Death ==
On 26 March 2025, 2 years after retiring from NSW Parliament, Lalich died at the age of 79, after a battle with throat cancer.

Civic offices
Preceded by	Mayor of Fairfield; 1993–1994	Succeeded by
Preceded by Anwar Khoshaba	Mayor of Fairfield; 2002–2012	Succeeded by Frank Carbone
New South Wales Legislative Assembly
Preceded by Reba Meagher	Member for Cabramatta; 2008–2023	Succeeded by Tri Vo
