= Dai Le =

Australian politician (born 1968)

Councillor Dai Le MP
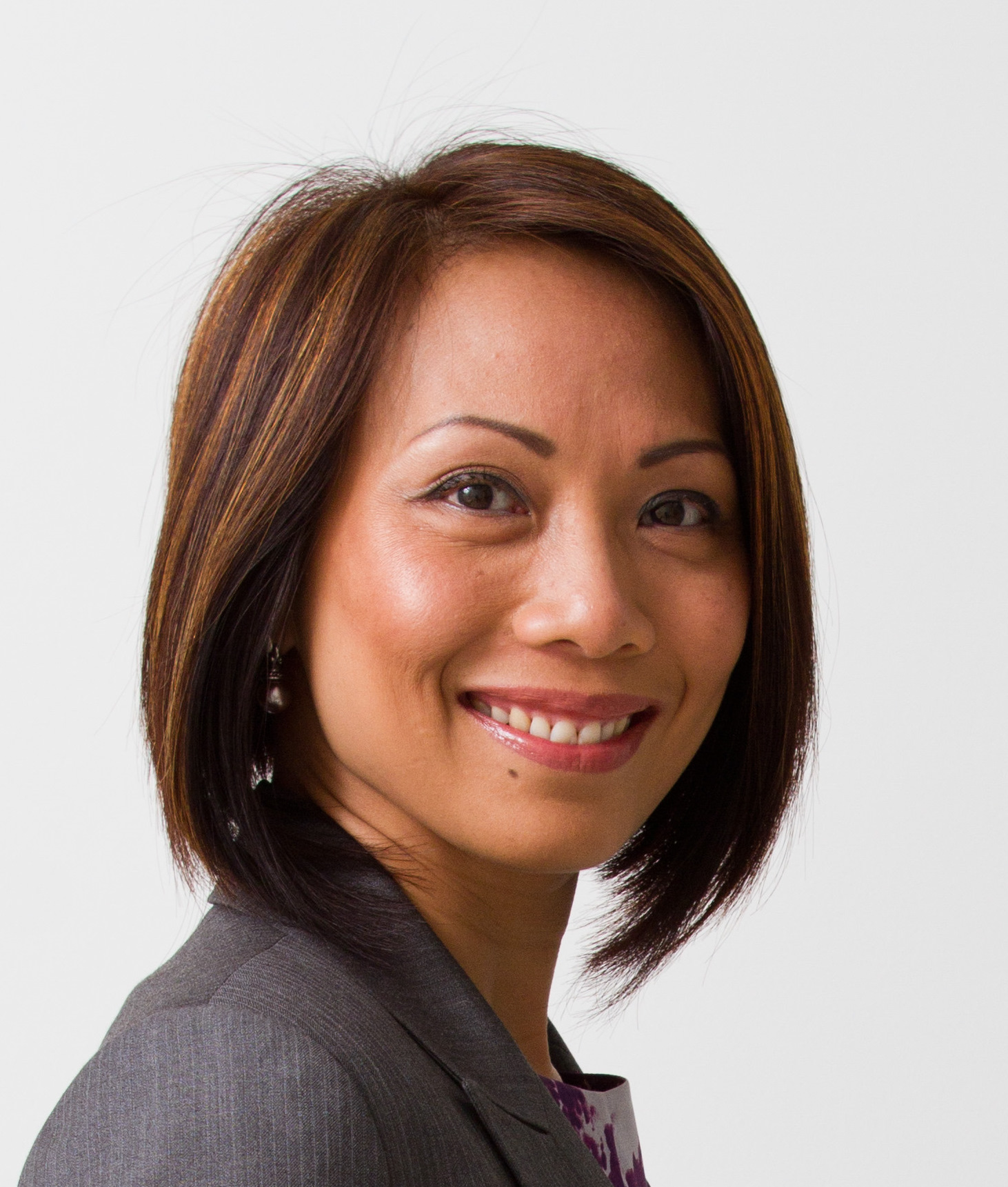
- Le in 2011

Member of the Australian Parliament for Fowler
- Incumbent
- Assumed office 21 May 2022
- Preceded by: Chris Hayes

Deputy Mayor of Fairfield
- Incumbent
- Assumed office 8 October 2024
- Mayor: Frank Carbone
- Preceded by: Charbel Saliba
- In office 21 December 2021 – 27 September 2022
- Mayor: Frank Carbone
- Preceded by: Peter Grippaudo
- Succeeded by: Reni Barkho

Councillor of the City of Fairfield for Fairfield/Cabravale Ward
- Incumbent
- Assumed office 4 December 2021
- Preceded by: New ward

Councillor of the City of Fairfield for Cabravale Ward
- In office 9 September 2012 – 4 December 2021
- Succeeded by: Ward abolished

Personal details
- Born: 1 April 1968 (age 58) Saigon, South Vietnam (now Ho Chi Minh City, Vietnam)
- Party: Independent (since 2016) (Note: Local affiliations: Western Sydney Community (since 2023); Australian Women's Party (since 2019))
- Other political affiliations: Liberal (until 2016)
- Spouse: Markus Lambert
- Children: 1
- Education: Macquarie University
- Website: daile.com.au

Dai Trang Le (Vietnamese: Lê Thị Trang Đài, pronounced [lej˧˧ ʈaːŋ˧˧ ʔɗaːj˨˩]; born 1 April 1968) is a Vietnamese-born Australian politician concurrently serving as the federal member for Fowler, councillor for Fairfield/Cabravale Ward at City of Fairfield, and deputy mayor at Fairfield City Council.

Le arrived in Australia in 1979 as a refugee of the Vietnam War after fleeing Saigon in April 1975 and spending four years with her family in refugee camps in the Philippines and Hong Kong. She became an ABC journalist and politician. She was named as one of the 100 most influential Australian women in 2014.

In 2012 she was elected as an independent councillor for the City of Fairfield in New South Wales and was the deputy mayor between 2021–2022 and since 2024. At the 2022 federal election, she successfully ran as an independent candidate in the Division of Fowler in Western Sydney. Le is the first refugee and Vietnamese Australian to be elected to the Australian House of Representatives. Le was re-elected for a second parliamentary term at the 2025 federal election.

== Early life ==
Le was born in wartime Saigon in 1968. Her family was "closely linked with the Americans" during the Vietnam War. On 30 April 1975, the day that North Vietnam captured Saigon, Le was taken to a port with her family by "military dressed men" and put on a boat to the Philippines. Her family initially believed they would be resettled in the United States and were told their father would join them – he was a Vietnamese lawyer working with the American Embassy – however he did not make it in time to board the boat. Neither Le nor her family ever saw him again.

She lived in a refugee camp in the Philippines for three years until 1979, when her mother decided to smuggle the family aboard another boat to Hong Kong. Her family lived in a refugee camp in Hong Kong for nine months until they were processed by the United Nations High Commissioner for Refugees and accepted for resettlement to Australia. She arrived in Australia by plane in December 1979. Her family lived briefly in the Fairy Meadow Migrant Hostel after arriving before eventually being resettled in Bossley Park, a suburb in Sydney's west.

Le attended St Mary Star of the Sea College in Wollongong and later Cerdon College in Merrylands where she completed her Higher School Certificate. She then completed a Bachelor of Arts at Macquarie University, majoring in political science.

== Journalism career ==
Le began her career in 1990 as a cadet journalist at the Liverpool City Champion newspaper, and later helped establish the Fairfield City Champion newspaper with both being part of the Fairfax Community Media Network (now Australian Community Media).

In 1996, Le was one of 15 Australians awarded with the Vincent Fairfax Ethics and Leadership Fellowship Program. The 1996–1997 program allowed Le to travel across Australia and within the Asia/Pacific region to meet and engage with different levels of government, leaders and community groups.

Le also worked for the Australian Broadcasting Corporation between 1994 and 2008 in a number of roles across TV and radio for programs such as Four Corners, Foreign Correspondent, Lateline, AM, PM, The World Today, and as a producer of Saturday Extra with Geraldine Doogue.

== Political career ==
=== Attempts to enter state politics ===
Le entered the political scene in 2008 as the Liberal Party candidate for the New South Wales state electoral district of Cabramatta in the 2008 by-election following the resignation of sitting MP and former NSW Health Minister Reba Meagher. During this campaign, Le achieved a 20.18-point swing against Labor but was unsuccessful in winning the seat.

At the 2011 NSW state election, Le stood again as the Liberal Party candidate for Cabramatta achieving a further 5-point swing to the Liberal Party turning the once safe Labor seat into a marginal seat. Le again was unsuccessful, losing the seat by 1,768 votes after preferences, reducing the overall margin for the seat to 2 points.

Le was a close friend to Liberal Legislative Council member Charlie Lynn. Following Lynn's announcement in early 2014 that he would retire from politics and would not contest 2015 state election, Le was considered "a strong contender" for Lynn's replacement and had the support from Lynn himself. The state premier and party leader Mike Baird was also "very keen" to have Le join the state parliament. However, Le did not nominate, with media reports stating that she and another woman were "persuaded" not to run by powerbroker and state minister Jai Rowell, who convinced her "she did not have the local support to win". It was also reported that Rowell would "support her in the later 'at large' preselection for a spot not so high on the ticket", which do not have direct responsibility for geographical areas. In the end, Lou Amato was selected as Lynn's replacement with Rowell's backing.

Following this, in October 2014, Le nominated in the general pre-selection to be in the Liberal Party's Legislative Council ticket for the 2015 election. However, she was again unsuccessful in the pre-selection.

=== Fairfield City Council ===
In 2012, while still a member of the Liberal Party, Le was elected as an independent candidate to Fairfield City Council's Cabravale Ward in the NSW Local Government Election.

In 2016, her bid to become mayor over the endorsed Liberal candidate resulted in her suspension from the Liberal Party for 10 years. She subsequently teamed up with mayor Frank Carbone, who resigned from the Labor Party, to lead a majority-independent council in the Local Government Election later that year.

Le represented Cabravale Ward between 2012 and 2021 before changes to ward boundaries led her to contest the newly created Fairfield/Cabravale Ward since the 2021 NSW local government election. Le was again elected to Fairfield City Council in 2024. She later explained that having the role in Council allowed her to "keep in touch with the real community needs", which she could elevate to the federal parliament in Canberra.

Le was elected as deputy mayor in December 2021. In September 2022, at the conclusion of her deputy mayor term, she stepped down as deputy mayor but remained as a councillor. This was to focus on her role as the newly-elected member for Fowler in the federal parliament. Le became the deputy mayor again in October 2024 following the local government election.

In 2023, Le and Carbone founded the Dai Le & Frank Carbone Network party, later registered with the Australian Electoral Commission as the Western Sydney Community.

=== Federal politics ===
Le stood as an independent candidate for the seat of Fowler at the 2022 federal election, in response to Labor candidate Kristina Keneally being parachuted into the seat. Le won the seat, with an 18-point swing against the Australian Labor Party, who had previously held it since its creation in 1984. She became the first refugee and Vietnamese Australian to be elected to the Australian House of Representatives.

After her election win, some had questions over her eligibility to serve as representative, due to questions on her foreign citizenship status. She dismissed these questions.

In early August 2022, as one of her first duties in Parliament Le abstained from the Climate Change Bill, tweeting:

"I will be abstaining from voting on the Climate Change Bill. I can’t justify voting yes on a bill that’s been rushed through parliament when we haven’t been given any specific details of the immediate impact on communities like Fowler and no guarantees that this initiative will not drive up electricity bills for locals and businesses. I support a cleaner and greener environment, but my main priority is making sure the high cost of living and unemployment rates in our area are stabilised – especially in these very tough economic times. I will consider supporting future climate policies only if they have a positive outcome for low-income families who are already struggling with high food, fuel and energy prices."

Le was re-elected at the 2025 federal election, defeating Labor candidate Tu Le (no relation). Her primary vote increased by about 5,000 and had a small two-candidate swing of 0.6% (against Labor) towards her.

== Personal life ==
Le is married to Markus Lambert and has one son.

In August 2012, Le was appointed to the Advisory Board of Multicultural NSW (formerly the NSW Community Relations Commission) providing advice to Government ministers and agencies.

In October 2014, Le discovered she had breast cancer and undertook intensive chemotherapy and radiation treatment. She later recovered from her breast cancer in 2015 and was appointed a Cancer Council ambassador for Greater Western Sydney.

Le is also the founder of the Diverse Australian Women's Network, which aims to empower women from diverse backgrounds through conversation and advocacy. She also founded the South West Entrepreneurial Hub, a platform for business owners, start-ups and entrepreneurs living in Sydney’s South West, to meet, collaborate and share their experiences and learn from one another.

Le is a lapsed Catholic, but has stated she “still believes in God and prays to the Virgin Mary”. She credits her election win to the intercession of the Blessed Virgin Mary.

Although her surname (Lê) is pronounced /lej˧˧/ in the Saigon dialect ("lay"), she has taken to use the pronunciation /liː/ ("lee") which the Australian public generally uses.

== Notes ==
Civic offices
Preceded by Peter Grippaudo	Deputy Mayor of Fairfield; 2021–2022	Succeeded by Reni Barkho
Parliament of Australia
Preceded by Chris Hayes	Member of Parliament for Fowler; 2022–present	Incumbent
