= List of mayors of Liverpool (New South Wales) =

Mayor of Liverpool
- Incumbent; Ned Mannoun since 4 December 2021
- Appointer: Liverpool City Council
- Term length: 4 years

This is a list of the mayors of the City of Liverpool, a local government area of New South Wales, Australia.

The current mayor is Ned Mannoun, who was elected in December 2021.

== Mayors ==
Mayor	Party	Term	Notes
Ron Dunbier	Labor	December 1948 – 9 December 1952	
Alex Grimson	Labor	9 December 1952 – 14 January 1953	
Alex Grimson	Independent	14 January 1953 – December 1954	
John Macdonald		December 1954 – December 1955	
Bill Rynan		December 1955 – December 1956	
Ron Dunbier	Independent	December 1956 – December 1959	
Joseph Bradshaw	Independent	December 1959 – December 1960	
Ernie Smith		December 1960 – December 1961	
Ron Dunbier	Independent	December 1961 – December 1962	
Joseph Bradshaw	Independent	December 1962 – December 1963	
Ernie Smith		December 1963 – December 1967	
George Paciullo	Labor	December 1967 – December 1969	
Joseph Bradshaw	Independent	December 1969 – September 1971	
Kevin Napier	Labor	September 1971 – September 1972	
Noel Short	Labor	September 1972 – September 1973	
Joe Durrant	Labor	September 1973 – September 1974	
Frank Oliveri	Independent	September 1974 – September 1975	
Joseph Bradshaw	Independent	September 1975 – 31 March 1976	
Allen Henderson (Administrator)		31 March 1976 – 17 September 1977	
Frank Oliveri	Independent	September 1977 – September 1978	
Noel Short	Labor	September 1978 – September 1979	
Ronald John Hollands	Labor	September 1979 – September 1980	
Noel Short	Labor	September 1980 – September 1983	
Frank Oliveri OAM	Independent	September 1983 – September 1984	
Casey Conway	Labor	September 1984 – September 1986	
Craig Knowles	Labor	September 1986 – September 1987	
Casey Conway	Labor	September 1987 – September 1988	
Gary Lucas	Independent	September 1988 – September 1989	
Ronald John Hollands	Labor	September 1989 – September 1990	
Colin Harrington	Independent	September 1990 – September 1991	
Mark Latham	Labor	September 1991 – September 1994	
George Paciullo	Labor	September 1994 – 16 March 2004	
Gabrielle Kibble AO (Administrator)		16 March 2004 – 13 September 2008	
Wendy Waller	Labor	13 September 2008 – 8 September 2012	
Ned Mannoun	Liberal	8 September 2012 – 10 September 2016	
Wendy Waller	Labor	10 September 2016 – 4 December 2021	
Ned Mannoun	Liberal	4 December 2021 – present	

== Election results ==
=== 2024 ===
2024 Liverpool City Council election: Mayor
Party	Candidate	Votes	%	±%
Liberal	Ned Mannoun	49,384	42.1	+0.3
Labor	Betty Green	30,019	25.6	−12.5
Our Local Community	Peter Ristevski	10,959	9.3	+9.3
Libertarian	Gemma Noiosi	8,809	7.5	+7.5
Independent	Michael Andjelkovic	4,819	4.1	−4.4
Community Independents	Peter Harle	4,280	3.6	−3.6
Community Voice	Deb Gurung	3,203	2.7	+2.7
Liverpool Independents	Karress Rhodes	2,664	2.3	+2.3
Independent	Michael Tierney	2,472	2.1	+2.1
Independent	Robert Aiken	773	0.7	+0.7
Total formal votes		117,382	91.5	−4.0
Informal votes		9,931	8.5	+4.0
Turnout		127,313		
Liberal	Ned Mannoun	52,369	53.4	
Labor	Betty Green	32,235	32.9	
Our Local Community	Peter Ristevski	13,469	13.7	
Liberal hold				

=== 2021 ===
2021 New South Wales mayoral elections: Liverpool
Party	Candidate	Votes	%	±%
Liberal	Ned Mannoun	48,112	41.8	+9.1
Labor	Nathan Hagarty	43,870	38.1	+0.0
Independent	Michael Andjelkovic	9,770	8.5	+8.5
Community Independents	Peter Harle	8,254	7.2	−2.7
Greens	Asm Morshed	5,171	4.5	+0.4
Total formal votes		115,177	95.5	
Informal votes		5,479	4.5	
Turnout		120,656	84.1	
Two-party-preferred result
Liberal	Ned Mannoun	51,277	51.3	
Labor	Nathan Hagarty	48,741	48.7	
Liberal gain from Labor		Swing		
