= List of mayors of Fairfield =

Mayor of Fairfield
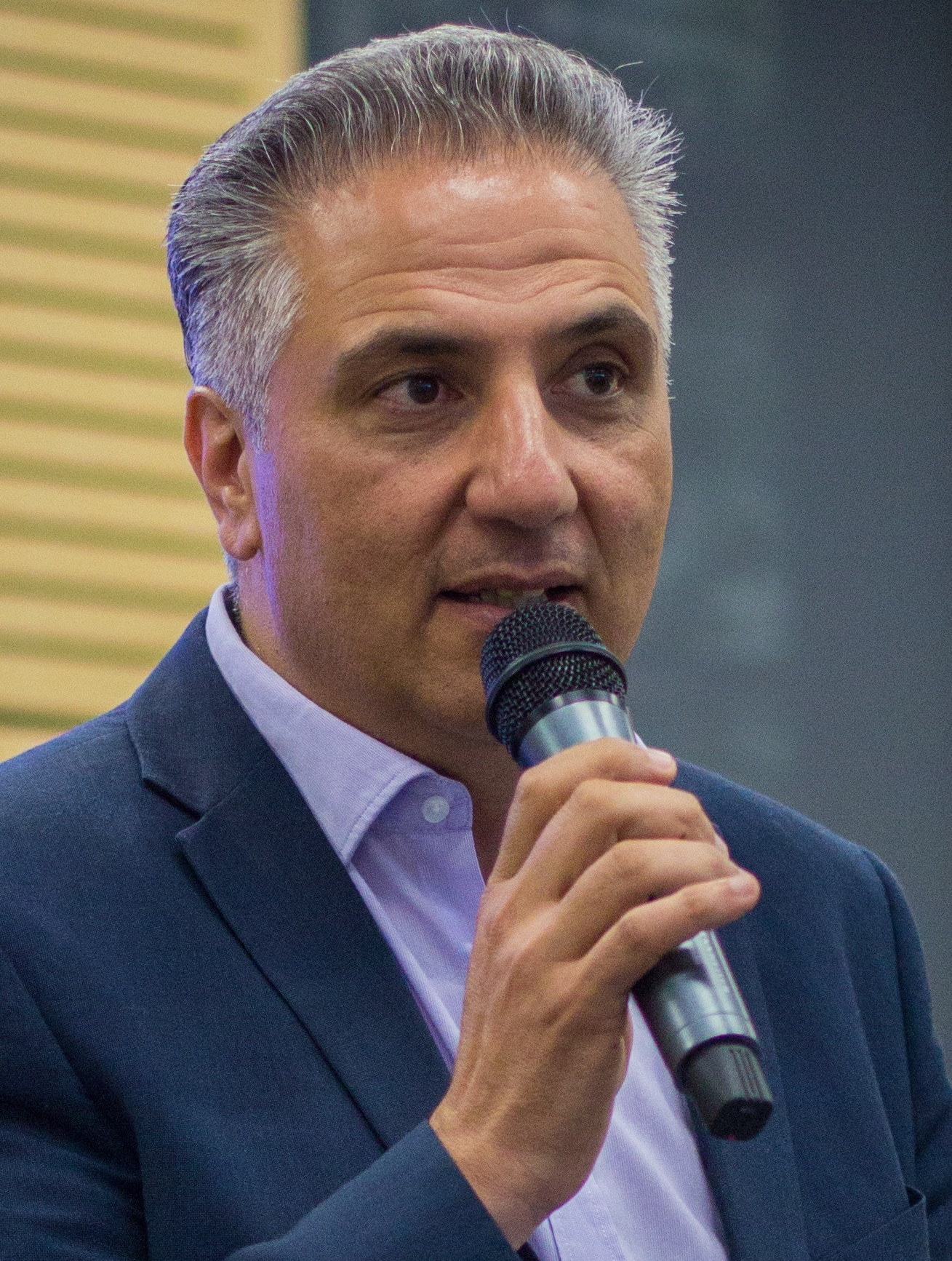
- Incumbent; Frank Carbone since 21 March 2012
- Appointer: Fairfield City Council
- Term length: 4 years
- Inaugural holder: Francis Atkin Kenyon
- Formation: 22 February 1889
- Deputy: Charbel Saliba

This is a list of the mayors and lord mayors of the City of Fairfield, a local government area of New South Wales, Australia.

The current mayor is Frank Carbone, who was elected in 2012 and most recently re-elected in 2024.

== Mayors ==
=== 1889–present ===
No.	Portrait	Mayor	Party	Term start	Term end
1		Francis Atkin Kenyon	Independent	22 February 1889	13 February 1891
2		John Lackey	Independent	13 February 1891	15 February 1893
3		Thomas Downey	Independent	15 February 1893	17 February 1894
4		William Stimson	Independent	17 February 1894	14 February 1896
5		Adam Vallance	Independent	14 February 1896	12 February 1898
6		Bruce Sofala Ephraim Hall	Independent	12 February 1898	14 February 1899
7		George Paine	Independent	14 February 1899	14 February 1900
8		Adam Craig Bell	Independent	14 February 1900	14 February 1901
9		John Edwards Anthony	Independent	14 February 1901	8 February 1902
10		James Robert Anderson	Independent	8 February 1902	February 1903
11		Walter Stimson	Independent	February 1903	11 February 1904
12		Samuel Critchley	Independent	11 February 1904	February 1905
13		John Downey	Independent	February 1905	15 February 1907
14		John Edwards Anthony	Independent	15 February 1907	6 July 1917
(11)		Walter Stimson	Independent	6 July 1917	11 February 1919
(14)		John Edwards Anthony	Independent	11 February 1919	4 February 1920
15		Thomas Miles	Independent	4 February 1920	6 December 1921
16		Amos Robert Coleman	Independent	6 December 1921	12 December 1922
(11)		Walter Stimson	Independent	12 December 1922	18 December 1923
17		Harold William Stein	Independent	18 December 1923	8 December 1925
18		Augustus Morris Jentsch	Independent	4 December 1928	8 December 1925
19		Henry Alfred Clancy	Independent	4 December 1928	5 January 1932
20		Robert Towers Gillies	Independent	5 January 1932	December 1932
(11)		Walter Stimson	Independent	December 1932	4 December 1934
21		Thomas Fishpool	Independent	4 December 1934	14 December 1937
22		Samuel Foster Money	Labor	14 December 1937	December 1938
23		John Burleigh, Snr.	Labor	December 1938	10 December 1941
(19)		Henry Alfred Clancy	Independent	10 December 1941	15 December 1943
24		Clifford Green	Independent	15 December 1943	December 1945
(19)		Henry Alfred Clancy	Independent	December 1945	December 1947
(24)		Clifford Green	Independent	December 1947	December 1948
25		Jack Henshaw	Labor	December 1948	6 December 1949
26		Jack McBurney	Citizens' Representative Party	6 December 1949	December 1950
27		Samuel Austin Seaman	Labor	December 1950	3 December 1951
28		Philip Bartholomew Ryan	Labor	3 December 1951	8 December 1952
29		William Leonard Wolfenden	Labor	8 December 1952	10 December 1953
30		Leslie Charles Hale	Progress Association	10 December 1953	12 December 1955
31		Les Powell	Labor	12 December 1955	2 December 1957
32		Keith Makepeace	Labor	2 December 1957	11 December 1958
33		Keith Howick	Labor	11 December 1958	10 December 1959
34		Vic Wenban	Labor	10 December 1959	December 1962
35		A. E. Harvey	Labor	December 1962	December 1963
36		Lawrence Fraser	Labor	December 1963	December 1964
(34)		Vic Wenban	Independent	December 1964	December 1965
37		Frank Calabro	Independent	December 1965	20 December 1966
(32)		Keith Makepeace	Independent	20 December 1966	December 1967
38		Harold Schofield	Independent	December 1967	September 1968
(37)		Frank Calabro	Independent	September 1968	September 1969
(35)		A. E. Harvey	Labor	September 1969	September 1970
(38)		Harold Schofield	Independent	September 1970 – September 1971	
39		Ian Thorley	Labor	September 1971	September 1973
40		Don Turtle	Labor	September 1972	September 1973
(31)		Les Powell	Labor	September 1973	September 1974
41		Janice Crosio	Labor	September 1974	September 1975
42		Ernest Loveday	Independent	September 1975	September 1976
43		Warren Colless	Independent	September 1976	September 1977
(41)		Janice Crosio	Labor	September 1977	September 1980
		Maria Heggie	Independent	September 1987	September 1988
		unknown		September 1988	September 1989
		Lawrence White	Labor	September 1989	September 1990
		unknown		September 1990	September 1991
		Dennis Donovan	Labor	September 1991	September 1992
		Toni Lord	Independent	September 1992	September 1993
		Nick Lalich	Labor	September 1993	September 1994
		unknown		September 1994	September 1995
		Maria Heggie	Independent	September 1995	September 1996
		Ken Chapman	Labor	September 1996	September 1997
		Anwar Khoshaba	Labor	September 1997	September 1998
		Chris Bowen	Labor	September 1998	September 1999
		Anwar Khoshaba	Labor	September 1999	September 2000
		Robert Watkins	Labor	September 2000	September 2001
		Anwar Khoshaba OAM	Labor	September 2001	September 2002
		Nick Lalich	Labor	September 2002	21 March 2012
		Frank Carbone	Labor	21 March 2012	29 August 2016
		Frank Carbone	Independent	29 August 2016	2021
		Frank Carbone	Frank Carbone	2021	9 May 2023
		Frank Carbone	Dai Le & Frank Carbone	9 May 2023	3 July 2024
		Frank Carbone	Western Sydney Community	3 July 2024	incumbent

== Deputy mayors ==
No.	Portrait	Deputy Mayor (Ward)	Party	Term start	Term end	Mayor
		Paul Azzo		22 September 2020	28 September 2021	Carbone (Frank Carbone/WSC)
		Peter Grippaudo		28 September 2021	21 December 2021	Carbone (Frank Carbone/WSC)
		Dai Le (Fairfield/Cabravale)	Women's Party	21 December 2021	27 September 2022	Carbone (Frank Carbone/WSC)
		Reni Barkho (Fairfield/Cabravale)	Dai Le & Frank Carbone	27 September 2022	28 September 2023	Carbone (Frank Carbone/WSC)
		Charbel Saliba (Parks)	Dai Le & Frank Carbone	28 September 2023	27 September 2024	Carbone (Frank Carbone/WSC)
		Dai Le (Fairfield/Cabravale)	Dai Le & Frank Carbone	8 October 2024	incumbent	Carbone (Frank Carbone/WSC)

== Election results ==
=== 2024 ===
2024 Fairfield City Council election: Mayor
Party	Candidate	Votes	%	±%
Frank Carbone	Frank Carbone	89,562	81.4	+7.9
Labor	Basim Shamaon	20,512	18.6	−7.9
Total formal votes		110,074	95.1	
Informal votes		5,705	4.9	
Turnout		115,779		
Frank Carbone hold		Swing	+7.9	

=== 2021 ===
2021 New South Wales mayoral elections: Fairfield
Party	Candidate	Votes	%	±%
Frank Carbone	Frank Carbone	66,455	73.5	+23.3
Labor	George Barcha	23,974	26.5	−23.3
Total formal votes		90,429	95.1	
Informal votes		4,688	4.9	
Turnout		95,117	73.3	
Frank Carbone hold		Swing	+23.3	

=== 2016 ===
2016 New South Wales mayoral elections: Fairfield
Party	Candidate	Votes	%	±%
Labor	Del Bennett	32,004	31.31	
Independent	Frank Carbone	29,683	29.04	
Independent	Dai Le	17,319	16.95	
Liberal	Joe Molluso	13,018	12.74	
Christian Democrats	Milan Maksimovic	6,944	6.79	
Greens	Bill Cashman	3,234	3.16	
Total formal votes		102,202	94.17	
Informal votes		6,331	5.83	
Turnout		108,533		
Independent	Frank Carbone			
Labor	Del Bennett			
Mayor changed to Independent from Labor		Swing	N/A	

=== 2012 ===
2012 New South Wales mayoral elections: Fairfield
Party	Candidate	Votes	%	±%
Labor	Frank Carbone	44,641	45.4	−15.0
Independent	Nhan Tran	15,833	16.1	+16.1
Independent Liberal	Zaya Toma	8,773	8.9	−24.6
Greens	Bill Cashman	8,371	8.5	+8.5
Independent	Sam Yousif	7,918	8.1	+8.1
Christian Democrats	Juliat Nasr	7,237	7.4	+7.4
Unity	Ken Yeung	5,647	5.7	+5.7
Total formal votes		98,450	90.8	
Informal votes			9.2	
Turnout			85.4	
Two-candidate-preferred result
Labor	Frank Carbone	49,041	71.3	+10.9
Independent	Nhan Tran	19,727	28.7	+28.7
Labor hold		Swing	N/A	
