= John Newman (Australian politician) =

Australian politician (1946–1994)

- Newman c. 1990s

Member of the New South Wales Legislative Assembly for Cabramatta
- In office 1 February 1986 – 5 September 1994
- Preceded by: Eric Bedford
- Succeeded by: Reba Meagher

Personal details
- Born: Johann Grauenig; 8 December 1946 Villach, Austria
- Died: 5 September 1994 (aged 47) Cabramatta, New South Wales, Australia
- Cause of death: Assassination (gunshot wounds)
- Party: Labor

John Paul Newman (born Johann Grauenig, formerly Naumenko; 8 December 1946 – 5 September 1994) was an Australian politician who served as a member of the New South Wales Legislative Assembly from 1986 until his assassination in 1994.

== Early life ==
Johann Grauenig was born in Villach, Austria, on 8 December 1946, the son of John Arch and Helene Grauenig. His mother later married Peter Naumenko, and changed her son's surname accordingly. He later anglicised his surname to "Newman" by deed poll on 17 March 1972. Newman arrived in Australia in 1950, aged four, and his family settled in Cabramatta in the western suburbs of Sydney. He attended Cabramatta Public School and Liverpool Boys High School.

== Political career ==
Newman had a long history of involvement with the labour movement and with the Labor Party, spending much of his working life as a union official. He was a State union organiser with the Federated Clerks' Union from 1970 to 1986. Newman completed post-graduate studies in industrial law at the University of Sydney and undertook a variety of Trade Union Training Authority education programmes. Newman was elected as an alderman of the Fairfield City Council in 1977 and remained on the council for 10 years. He was deputy mayor in 1985–86 and also served as acting mayor in 1986. In December 1979 Newman's pregnant wife, Mary, and five-year-old son, David, were killed in an automobile accident at Bossley Park.

Following a by-election in the seat of Cabramatta, Newman was elected to the New South Wales Legislative Assembly on 1 February 1986. He was easily re-elected at the 1988 and 1991 state elections. Since the 1970s, Cabramatta has been a centre for immigrants and refugees from Asian backgrounds, particularly Vietnam, China, Laos, Cambodia and Thailand. Prior to his assassination, Newman had waged a campaign (by helping to form Task Force Oak) to combat Asian organised crime. and fight the corruption, drugs, crime (particularly home invasions), and prostitution that had plagued the Cabramatta area.

== Death ==
At 9:30 pm on the night of 5 September 1994, Newman was shot twice in the chest in the car-park of his Woods Avenue, Cabramatta home. He was pronounced dead at the scene. His fiancée, Lucy Wang, was with him at the time (helping to put a car cover on his vehicle) as she witnessed the attack and was unharmed. She reported seeing a hooded man in an army style jacket, who fired four shots, then fled in a waiting car. Newman was later given a state funeral.

== Investigation ==
Within days, the leader of a gang, 21-year-old Tri Minh Tran became the prime suspect. A local club owner, Phuong Ngo's conflict with Newman and his close ties to Tran led to widespread rumours in the community that he was involved and the media repeated the allegations. Tran, who had led the gang since the age of 14, was assassinated on 7 August 1995. Ngo attended the funeral and then became the focus of police attention after one of Tran's relatives made a statement to police that Tran had rejected an offer of $10,000 from Ngo to kill Newman.

The case against Ngo was weak and after Ngo provided information to police that led to the arrest of the informant, the task force investigating the Newman murder was disbanded. Ngo who had previously attempted to secure Labor Party pre-selection for the seat of Cabramatta and had run against him as an independent in 1991, was convicted of the killing in 2001. Two of Ngo's alleged associates were acquitted. Ngo has never confessed to the murder and continues to protest his innocence, claiming he had no motive to kill Newman because he was offered the Cabramatta seat about eight hours before the MP was shot.

Ngo had been tried on three occasions for the murder of Newman. The first trial was aborted for legal reasons, and, in the second trial, the jury could not reach a verdict. In the third trial, held from 7 March 29 June 2001, Ngo was convicted of murdering Newman and was sentenced to life imprisonment.

In 2003, an appeal by Ngo against the conviction failed. A judicial inquiry was launched into his conviction on 6 June 2008, by order of Chief Justice James Spigelman of the Supreme Court of New South Wales. The inquiry was overseen by former and Acting District Court judge, David Patten, and addressed several concerns raised as to the validity of the original conviction. On 17 April 2009 Patten ruled that the original conviction was sound. Following the inquiry, calls were made to have Ngo's name removed from monuments in Cabramatta. Calls for the council to name a landmark in honour of Newman have not proceeded so far, although a swimming pool in Prairiewood bears his name.

== See also ==
- Frederick McDonald, whose disappearance in April 1926 may have been at the ends of political rival Thomas Ley, following a bribery scandal and attempt to overturn Ley's election to Parliament in the 1925 Australian federal election.

New South Wales Legislative Assembly
Preceded by Eric Bedford	Member for Cabramatta; 1986–1994	Succeeded by Reba Meagher
