= Reba Meagher =

Australian politician (born 1967)

The Honourable Reba Meagher

Minister for Health
- In office 2 April 2007 – 5 September 2008
- Premier: Morris Iemma
- Preceded by: John Hatzistergos
- Succeeded by: John Della Bosca

Minister for Community Services Minister for Youth
- In office 21 January 2005 – 2 April 2007
- Premier: Bob Carr; Morris Iemma
- Preceded by: Carmel Tebbutt
- Succeeded by: Kevin Greene (Community Services); Linda Burney (Youth)

Minister for Aboriginal Affairs Minister Assisting the Premier on Citizenship
- In office 8 November 2006 – 2 April 2007
- Premier: Morris Iemma
- Preceded by: Milton Orkopoulos
- Succeeded by: Paul Lynch (Aboriginal Affairs); Graham West (Assisting on Citizenship)

Minister for Fair Trading Minister Assisting the Minister for Commerce
- In office 2 April 2003 – 21 January 2005
- Minister: John Della Bosca
- Premier: Bob Carr
- Preceded by: John Aquilina
- Succeeded by: John Hatzistergos

Member of the New South Wales Legislative Assembly for Cabramatta
- In office 22 October 1994 – 17 September 2008
- Preceded by: John Newman
- Succeeded by: Nick Lalich

Personal details
- Born: 11 September 1967 (age 59) Caringbah, New South Wales, Australia
- Party: Labor
- Education: University of Sydney
- Occupation: Trade unionist

Reba Paige Meagher (born 11 September 1967) is an Australian former politician who was a member of the New South Wales Legislative Assembly, representing the electoral district of Cabramatta. She was a minister in various portfolios from 2003 to 2008, including Minister for Health. On 6 September 2008 Meagher announced that she would not be seeking a ministerial appointment from new Premier Nathan Rees. On 13 September 2008 she announced her retirement from politics. She formally resigned on 17 September 2008.

== Early life ==
Meagher was born in 1967 in Caringbah, New South Wales, the daughter of Les Meagher, a printer for the Sydney Morning Herald. She received her Higher School Certificate from Endeavour High School in 1985. She graduated with a Bachelor of Arts from the University of Sydney in 1989, and a Master of Labour Law and Relations in 1992.

== Political career ==
Meagher declared on 7 November 2008 at an inquiry that, just over an hour after the Cabramatta MP John Newman had been shot in front of his fiancée on 5 September 1994, the then Labor Party head John Della Bosca, offered the seat to Reba Meagher, confirming an offer he had first made hours before the killing.

While in Parliament, Meagher served in a number of ministerial and sub-ministerial positions:

- Parliamentary Secretary Assisting the Minister for Transport and Minister for Roads on matters concerning Roads (April 1999 to March 2002)
- Parliamentary Secretary Assisting the Minister for Police (March 2003 to April 2003)
- Minister for Fair Trading (April 2003 to January 2005)
- Minister Assisting the Minister for Commerce (April 2003 to January 2005)
- Minister for Youth (January 2005 to April 2007)
- Minister for Community Services (January 2005 to April 2007)
- Minister for Aboriginal Affairs (November 2006 to April 2007)
- Minister Assisting the Premier on Citizenship (November 2006 to April 2007)
- Minister for Health (April 2007 to September 2008)

She also served on a number of Parliamentary Committees:

- Member, Committee on the Office of the Ombudsman and the Police Integrity Commission (May 1995 to April 1998)
- Member, Legislative Assembly Standing Ethics Committee (May 1995 to March 1999)
- Member, Committee on the Independent Commission Against Corruption (May 1995 to March 1999)
- Member, Joint Standing Committee upon Small Business (November 1996 to March 1999)
- Member, Joint Select Committee into Injecting Rooms (June 1997 to February 1998)

Political offices
Preceded by John Aquilina	Minister for Fair Trading; 2003–2005	Succeeded by John Hatzistergos
New title	Minister Assisting the Minister for Commerce; 2003–2005	Succeeded by John Hatzistergos
Preceded by Carmel Tebbutt	Minister for Community Services; 2005–2007	Succeeded by Kevin Greene
Preceded by Carmel Tebbutt	Minister for Youth; 2005–2007	Succeeded by Linda Burney
Preceded by Milton Orkopoulos	Minister for Aboriginal Affairs; 2006–2007	Succeeded by Paul Lynch
Preceded by Milton Orkopoulos	Minister Assisting the Premier for Citizenship; 2006–2007	Succeeded by Graham West
Preceded by John Hatzistergos	Minister for Health; 2007–2008	Succeeded by John Della Bosca
New South Wales Legislative Assembly
Preceded by John Newman	Member for Cabramatta; 1994–2008	Succeeded by Nick Lalich
