= Electoral district of Cabramatta =

State electoral district of New South Wales, Australia

Cabramatta New South Wales—Legislative Assembly
- Interactive map of district boundaries from the 2023 state election
- State: New South Wales
- Created: 1981
- MP: Tri Vo
- Party: Labor Party
- Namesake: Cabramatta
- Electors: 54,991 (2019)
- Area: 26 km^{2} (10.0 sq mi)
- Demographic: Outer metropolitan
Electorates around Cabramatta:
Badgerys Creek	Prospect	Fairfield
Badgerys Creek	Cabramatta	Fairfield
Liverpool	Liverpool	East Hills; Holsworthy

Cabramatta is an electoral district of the Legislative Assembly in the Australian state of New South Wales. It is currently represented by Tri Vo of the Labor Party.

Cabramatta is a 25.73 km^{2} urban electorate in Greater Western Sydney, centred on the suburb of Cabramatta from which it takes its name.

== Geography ==
On its current boundaries, Cabramatta includes the suburbs of Bonnyrigg, Bonnyrigg Heights, Cabramatta, Cabramatta West, Canley Vale, Edensor Park, Greenfield Park, Lansvale, Mount Pritchard and St Johns Park.

== History ==
The Cabramatta electorate was created in 1981, and has overwhelmingly voted Labor ever since its inception. It remains one of the party's safest seats in New South Wales, and the conservative Liberal Party barely polls at all in the electorate. The Unity Party polled well in the electorate, beating the Liberal Party by more than two thousand votes in 1999, though it slipped back to fourth in 2003.

The seat was held from 1981 to 1985 by inaugural member Eric Bedford, who served as Minister for Education and Minister for Planning in the Wran Labor government. He resigned on 1 December 1985, and was replaced by John Newman at the resulting by-election. Newman represented the electorate until he was assassinated in 1994.

Reba Meagher was elected to replace Newman in the subsequent by-election and was the member for Cabramatta until her resignation in 2008. Meagher served as a minister in the Carr and Iemma governments, and polled more than 67% of the vote at the 2003 election. She resigned her seat on 16 September 2008, with the by-election following on 18 October.

Nick Lalich was representative from 2008 until 2023 when he announced retirement by the end of 2022. Nick Lalich was succeeded by Tri Vo at the 2023 state election.

== Members for Cabramatta ==
Member	Party	Period
Eric Bedford	Labor	1981–1985
John Newman	Labor	1986–1994
Reba Meagher	Labor	1994–2008
Nick Lalich	Labor	2008–2023
Tri Vo	Labor	2023–present

== Election results ==
2023 New South Wales state election: Cabramatta
Party	Candidate	Votes	%	±%
Labor	Tri Vo	21,213	41.3	−7.2
Liberal	Courtney Nguyen	11,604	22.6	+1.6
Independent	Kate Hoang	8,522	16.6	+16.6
Liberal Democrats	Mark Smaling	5,046	9.8	+9.8
Greens	Roz Chia Davis	2,645	5.2	−0.1
Animal Justice	Randa Moussa	2,299	4.5	+3.9
Total formal votes		51,329	94.5	−1.1
Informal votes		3,005	5.5	+1.1
Turnout		54,334	88.4	−3.0
Two-party-preferred result
Labor	Tri Vo	24,460	61.8	−7.5
Liberal	Courtney Nguyen	15,117	38.2	+7.5
Labor hold		Swing	−7.5	
