= Electoral results for the district of Parramatta =

Election results for Parramatta, New South Wales, Australia

Parramatta, an electoral district of the Legislative Assembly in the Australian state of New South Wales, has continuously existed since the establishment of the Legislative Assembly in 1855.

== Members ==
Election	Member	Party	Member	Party		
1856	Henry Parker	None	George Oakes	None		
1856 by	Henry Parker	None	George Oakes	None		
1858	James Byrnes	None	George Oakes	None		
1859	James Byrnes	None	George Oakes	None		
1860	James Byrnes	None	John Lackey	None		
1861 by	Arthur Holroyd	None	John Lackey	None		
1864	James Byrnes	None	James Farnell	None		
1869	James Byrnes	None	James Farnell	None		
1872	Hugh Taylor	None	James Farnell	None		
1972 by	Hugh Taylor	None	James Farnell	None		
1874	Hugh Taylor	None	Charles Byrnes	None		
1876 by	Hugh Taylor	None	Charles Byrnes	None		
1877	Hugh Taylor	None	William Long	None		
1880	Charles Byrnes	None				
1882	Hugh Taylor	None				
1885	Hugh Taylor	None				
1887	Hugh Taylor	Free Trade				
1889	Hugh Taylor	Free Trade				
1891	Hugh Taylor	Free Trade				
1894	Dowell O'Reilly	Ind. Free Trade				
1895	Dowell O'Reilly	Free Trade				
1898	William Ferris	Independent Federalist				
1898 by	William Ferris	Protectionist				
1901	Tom Moxham	Liberal Reform				
1904	Tom Moxham	Liberal Reform				
1907	Tom Moxham	Liberal Reform				
1910	Tom Moxham	Liberal Reform				
1913	Tom Moxham	Liberal Reform				
1916 by	Albert Bruntnell	Liberal Reform				
1917	Albert Bruntnell	Nationalist	Member	Party	Member	Party
1920	Albert Bruntnell	Nationalist	Bill Ely	Labor	Jack Lang	Labor
1922	Albert Bruntnell	Nationalist	Thomas Morrow	Nationalist	Jack Lang	Labor
1925	Albert Bruntnell	Nationalist	Bill Ely	Labor	Jack Lang	Labor
1927	Albert Bruntnell	Nationalist				
1929 by	Herbert Lloyd	Nationalist				
1930	Joseph Byrne	Labor				
1932	George Gollan	United Australia				
1935	George Gollan	United Australia				
1938	George Gollan	United Australia				
1941	George Gollan	United Australia				
1944	George Gollan	Democratic				
1947	George Gollan	Liberal				
1950	George Gollan	Liberal				
1953	Kevin Morgan	Labor				
1956	Jim Clough	Liberal				
1959	Dan Mahoney	Labor				
1962	Dan Mahoney	Labor				
1965	Dan Mahoney	Labor				
1968	Dan Mahoney	Labor				
1971	Dan Mahoney	Labor				
1973	Dan Mahoney	Labor				
1976	Barry Wilde	Labor				
1978	Barry Wilde	Labor				
1981	Barry Wilde	Labor				
1984	Barry Wilde	Labor				
1988	John Books	Liberal				
1991	Andrew Ziolkowski	Labor				
1994 by	Gabrielle Harrison	Labor				
1995	Gabrielle Harrison	Labor				
1999	Gabrielle Harrison	Labor				
2003	Tanya Gadiel	Labor				
2007	Tanya Gadiel	Labor				
2011	Geoff Lee	Liberal				
2015	Geoff Lee	Liberal				
2019	Geoff Lee	Liberal				
2023	Donna Davis	Labor				

== Election results ==
=== Elections in the 2020s ===
==== 2023 ====
2023 New South Wales state election: Parramatta
Party	Candidate	Votes	%	±%
Labor	Donna Davis	22,704	47.0	+13.0
Liberal	Katie Mullens	17,152	35.5	−14.5
Greens	Ben Hammond	4,852	10.0	+2.1
One Nation	Mritunjay Singh	2,464	5.1	+5.1
Sustainable Australia	David Moll	1,109	2.3	+1.2
Total formal votes		48,281	96.9	+0.2
Informal votes		1,519	3.1	−0.2
Turnout		49,800	85.9	+2.4
Two-party-preferred result
Labor	Donna Davis	26,355	58.6	+15.0
Liberal	Katie Mullens	18,655	41.4	−15.0
Labor gain from Liberal		Swing	+15.0	

=== Elections in the 2010s ===
==== 2019 ====
2019 New South Wales state election: Parramatta
Party	Candidate	Votes	%	±%
Liberal	Geoff Lee	26,322	54.02	+0.18
Labor	Liz Scully	14,736	30.24	+1.49
Greens	Phil Bradley	3,637	7.46	−0.92
Independent OLC	Michelle Garrard	1,955	4.01	+0.81
Keep Sydney Open	Samuel Bellwood	1,023	2.10	+2.10
Sustainable Australia	Jasmina Moltter	701	1.44	+1.44
Socialist Alliance	Susan Price	354	0.73	+0.73
Total formal votes		48,728	96.78	+0.46
Informal votes		1,621	3.22	−0.46
Turnout		50,349	88.30	−1.03
Two-party-preferred result
Liberal	Geoff Lee	27,330	60.65	−2.21
Labor	Liz Scully	17,733	39.35	+2.21
Liberal hold		Swing	−2.21	

==== 2015 ====
2015 New South Wales state election: Parramatta
Party	Candidate	Votes	%	±%
Liberal	Geoff Lee	25,559	53.8	+5.3
Labor	James Shaw	13,649	28.8	+1.4
Greens	Phil Bradley	3,978	8.4	−0.3
Christian Democrats	Kamal Boutros	1,603	3.4	−0.7
Independent OLC	Michelle Garrard	1,519	3.2	+3.2
No Land Tax	Frank Arduca	672	1.4	+1.4
Communist League	Joanne Kuniansky	490	1.0	+0.7
Total formal votes		47,470	96.3	+0.8
Informal votes		1,812	3.7	−0.8
Turnout		49,282	89.3	+5.1
Two-party-preferred result
Liberal	Geoff Lee	26,932	62.9	+0.3
Labor	James Shaw	15,910	37.1	−0.3
Liberal hold		Swing	+0.3	

==== 2011 ====
2011 New South Wales state election: Parramatta
Party	Candidate	Votes	%	±%
Liberal	Geoff Lee	21,673	48.4	+19.6
Labor	Pierre Esber	12,425	27.7	−23.6
Greens	Phil Bradley	3,806	8.5	+1.8
Hatton's Independent Team	Michael McDermott	3,282	7.3	+7.3
Christian Democrats	Peter Magee	1,674	3.7	−1.7
Socialist Alliance	Duncan Roden	706	1.6	+1.6
Family First	Thomas Katsoulas	622	1.4	+1.4
Independent	Kon Paraskevopoulos	438	1.0	+1.0
Communist League	Robert Aiken	152	0.3	+0.3
Total formal votes		44,778	96.2	−0.7
Informal votes		1,753	3.8	+0.7
Turnout		46,531	90.7	
Two-party-preferred result
Liberal	Geoff Lee	23,669	62.1	+25.8
Labor	Pierre Esber	14,464	37.9	−25.8
Liberal gain from Labor		Swing	+25.8	

=== Elections in the 2000s ===
==== 2007 ====
2007 New South Wales state election: Parramatta
Party	Candidate	Votes	%	±%
Labor	Tanya Gadiel	21,110	51.4	+1.2
Liberal	John Chedid	11,844	28.8	+0.9
Greens	Tim Hendry	2,742	6.7	−0.3
Christian Democrats	Doug Morrison	2,220	5.4	+2.2
Unity	Ada Wong	1,625	4.0	+0.2
AAFI	John Mansfield	797	1.9	+1.6
Democrats	Robert McFarlane	750	1.8	+0.3
Total formal votes		41,088	96.9	−0.3
Informal votes		1,296	3.1	+0.3
Turnout		42,384	91.5	
Two-party-preferred result
Labor	Tanya Gadiel	23,537	63.7	+0.1
Liberal	John Chedid	13,399	36.3	−0.1
Labor hold		Swing	+0.1	

==== 2003 ====
2003 New South Wales state election: Parramatta
Party	Candidate	Votes	%	±%
Labor	Tanya Gadiel	19,761	49.9	−3.7
Liberal	Chiang Lim	11,049	27.9	−2.1
Greens	Doug Williamson	2,836	7.2	+4.5
Independent	Lorraine Wearne	1,688	4.3	+4.3
Unity	Ernest Chan	1,502	3.8	+0.2
Christian Democrats	Michael Horgan	1,266	3.2	+3.2
One Nation	Daniel Mullins	597	1.5	−3.4
Democrats	Tony Yoo	593	1.5	−1.7
Independent	Les Vance	313	0.8	+0.8
Total formal votes		39,605	97.2	−0.2
Informal votes		1,152	2.8	+0.2
Turnout		40,757	90.3	
Two-party-preferred result
Labor	Tanya Gadiel	21,996	63.4	−1.1
Liberal	Chiang Lim	12,682	36.6	+1.1
Labor hold		Swing	−1.1	

=== Elections in the 1990s ===
==== 1999 ====
1999 New South Wales state election: Parramatta
Party	Candidate	Votes	%	±%
Labor	Gabrielle Harrison	21,466	53.6	+5.6
Liberal	Moira Copping	12,023	30.0	−10.9
One Nation	Terry Cooksley	1,953	4.9	+4.9
Unity	Rodney McCarthy	1,426	3.6	+3.6
Democrats	Peter Byrne	1,280	3.2	−1.4
Greens	Peter Wright	1,063	2.7	+2.7
AAFI	Lindsay Butler	360	0.9	+0.9
Democratic Socialist	Kylie Moon	257	0.6	+0.6
Natural Law	John Cogger	101	0.3	−0.3
Non-Custodial Parents	Michael McMahon	84	0.2	+0.2
Total formal votes		40,013	97.3	+2.8
Informal votes		1,094	2.7	−2.8
Turnout		41,107	91.0	
Two-party-preferred result
Labor	Gabrielle Harrison	23,472	64.5	+11.0
Liberal	Moira Copping	12,915	35.5	−11.0
Labor hold		Swing	+11.0	

==== 1995 ====
1995 New South Wales state election: Parramatta
Party	Candidate	Votes	%	±%
Labor	Gabrielle Harrison	18,340	54.7	+10.4
Liberal	Damon Beck	12,089	36.0	−6.6
Call to Australia	Dee Jonsson	1,657	4.9	+4.9
Democrats	Eduardo Avila	1,097	3.3	−1.3
Natural Law	John Cogger	365	1.1	+1.1
Total formal votes		33,548	94.7	+4.5
Informal votes		1,863	5.3	−4.5
Turnout		35,411	93.9	
Two-party-preferred result
Labor	Gabrielle Harrison	19,275	59.2	+6.6
Liberal	Damon Beck	13,285	40.8	−6.6
Labor hold		Swing	+6.6	

==== 1994 by-election ====
1994 Parramatta state by-election Saturday 27 August
Party	Candidate	Votes	%	±%
Labor	Gabrielle Harrison	16,527	54.9	+10.6
Liberal	Wendy Jones	9,523	31.7	−10.9
Independent	Tony Issa	811	2.7	+2.7
Greens	Miranda Fitzgerald	798	2.6	+2.6
Call to Australia	Bruce Coleman	724	2.4	+2.4
Grey Power	John Verheyen	665	2.2	+2.2
Independent	Charles Malkoun	593	2.0	+2.0
Daylight Saving Extension	Tony de Govrik	324	1.1	+1.1
Independent	John Cogger	125	0.4	+0.4
Total formal votes		30,090	96.3	+6.1
Informal votes		1,169	3.7	−6.1
Turnout		31,259	79.0	−14.9
Two-party-preferred result
Labor	Gabrielle Harrison	18,013	62.0	+9.4
Liberal	Wendy Jones	11,025	38.0	−9.4
Labor hold		Swing	+9.4	

Andrew Ziolkowski (Labor) died.

==== 1991 ====
1991 New South Wales state election: Parramatta
Party	Candidate	Votes	%	±%
Labor	Andrew Ziolkowski	13,984	44.3	−3.0
Liberal	John Books	13,467	42.6	−1.8
Independent	John Brown	2,407	7.6	+7.6
Democrats	Gail Kerr	1,443	4.6	+0.4
Independent	Cherie Loel	280	0.9	+0.9
Total formal votes		31,581	90.2	−6.4
Informal votes		3,434	9.8	+6.4
Turnout		35,015	93.9	
Two-party-preferred result
Labor	Andrew Ziolkowski	15,914	52.6	+2.1
Liberal	John Books	14,352	47.4	−2.1
Labor notional hold		Swing	+2.1	

The sitting member was John Books (Liberal) however Parramatta became a notional Labor seat as a result of the 1990 redistribution.

=== Elections in the 1980s ===
==== 1988 ====
1988 New South Wales state election: Parramatta
Party	Candidate	Votes	%	±%
Liberal	John Books	12,972	47.1	+10.7
Labor	Barry Wilde	12,807	46.5	−3.2
Democrats	Rodney Levett	1,777	6.4	+3.9
Total formal votes		27,556	96.8	+0.1
Informal votes		897	3.2	−0.1
Turnout		28,453	93.4	
Two-party-preferred result
Liberal	John Books	13,743	50.5	+5.9
Labor	Barry Wilde	13,475	49.5	−5.9
Liberal gain from Labor		Swing	+5.9	

==== 1984 ====
1984 New South Wales state election: Parramatta
Party	Candidate	Votes	%	±%
Labor	Barry Wilde	14,392	49.5	−7.2
Liberal	John Worthington	10,558	36.3	+10.2
Independent	Kenneth Hale	3,385	11.6	+11.6
Democrats	John Macrae	752	2.6	0.0
Total formal votes		29,087	96.8	+0.5
Informal votes		960	3.2	−0.5
Turnout		30,047	90.9	+1.7
Two-party-preferred result
Labor	Barry Wilde		55.3	−10.4
Liberal	John Worthington		44.7	+10.4
Labor hold		Swing	−10.4	

==== 1981 ====
1981 New South Wales state election: Parramatta
Party	Candidate	Votes	%	±%
Labor	Barry Wilde	15,517	56.7	
Liberal	Paul Zammit	7,131	26.1	
Independent	Anthony Buhagiar	4,008	14.6	
Democrats	Barry Jacques	713	2.6	
Total formal votes		27,369	96.3	
Informal votes		1,054	3.7	
Turnout		28,423	89.2	
Two-party-preferred result
Labor	Barry Wilde	17,517	65.7	−0.6
Liberal	Paul Zammit	9,131	34.3	+0.6
Labor hold		Swing	−0.6	

=== Elections in the 1970s ===
==== 1978 ====
1978 New South Wales state election: Parramatta
Party	Candidate	Votes	%	±%
Labor	Barry Wilde	20,340	67.4	+11.1
Liberal	Roy McAuley	8,885	29.5	−11.1
Democrats	Stephen Mason	936	3.1	+3.1
Total formal votes		30,161	97.6	−0.7
Informal votes		744	2.4	+0.7
Turnout		30,905	91.7	−0.3
Two-party-preferred result
Labor	Barry Wilde	20,809	69.0	+11.8
Liberal	Roy McAuley	9,352	31.0	−11.8
Labor hold		Swing	+11.8	

==== 1976 ====
1976 New South Wales state election: Parramatta
Party	Candidate	Votes	%	±%
Labor	Barry Wilde	17,383	56.3	+0.7
Liberal	James Brown	12,553	40.6	+1.2
Workers	Barrie Sharpe	953	3.1	+3.1
Total formal votes		30,889	98.3	+0.4
Informal votes		537	1.7	−0.4
Turnout		31,426	92.0	+1.6
Two-party-preferred result
Labor	Barry Wilde	17,669	57.2	+0.6
Liberal	James Brown	13,220	42.8	−0.6
Labor hold		Swing	+0.6	

==== 1973 ====
1973 New South Wales state election: Parramatta
Party	Candidate	Votes	%	±%
Labor	Dan Mahoney	16,524	55.6	−1.6
Liberal	Hilton Robinson	11,719	39.5	−0.3
Democratic Labor	Mary Woodbury	1,464	4.9	+4.9
Total formal votes		29,707	97.9	
Informal votes		643	2.1	
Turnout		30,350	90.4	
Two-party-preferred result
Labor	Dan Mahoney	16,817	56.6	−3.1
Liberal	Hilton Robinson	12,890	43.4	+3.1
Labor hold		Swing	−3.1	

==== 1971 ====
1971 New South Wales state election: Parramatta
Party	Candidate	Votes	%	±%
Labor	Dan Mahoney	16,691	57.2	+4.8
Liberal	Alaric Kellett	11,621	39.8	−0.3
Independent	Leonard Kiernan	891	3.0	+3.0
Total formal votes		29,203	98.3	
Informal votes		507	1.7	
Turnout		29,710	93.7	
Two-party-preferred result
Labor	Dan Mahoney	17,137	58.7	+3.2
Liberal	Alaric Kellett	12,066	41.3	−3.2
Labor hold		Swing	+3.2	

=== Elections in the 1960s ===
==== 1968 ====
1968 New South Wales state election: Parramatta
Party	Candidate	Votes	%	±%
Labor	Dan Mahoney	14,501	52.4	−0.1
Liberal	Hilton Robinson	11,109	40.1	−3.7
Rates and Taxpayers	Leonard Kiernan	909	3.3	+3.3
Democratic Labor	John Stewart	615	2.2	−1.5
Independent	Wayne Merton	550	2.0	+2.0
Total formal votes		27,684	96.8	
Informal votes		905	3.2	
Turnout		28,589	94.2	
Two-party-preferred result
Labor	Dan Mahoney	15,354	55.5	+2.3
Liberal	Hilton Robinson	12,330	44.5	−2.3
Labor hold		Swing	+2.3	

==== 1965 ====
1965 New South Wales state election: Parramatta
Party	Candidate	Votes	%	±%
Labor	Dan Mahoney	14,078	52.5	−5.3
Liberal	Paul Bland	11,754	43.8	+1.6
Democratic Labor	Hans Andreasson	981	3.7	+3.7
Total formal votes		26,813	98.5	−0.3
Informal votes		404	1.5	+0.3
Turnout		27,217	94.4	−0.3
Two-party-preferred result
Labor	Dan Mahoney	14,274	53.2	−4.6
Liberal	Paul Bland	12,539	46.8	+4.6
Labor hold		Swing	−4.6	

==== 1962 ====
1962 New South Wales state election: Parramatta
Party	Candidate	Votes	%	±%
Labor	Dan Mahoney	14,373	57.8	+3.9
Liberal	Marion Hearnshaw	10,479	42.2	−0.6
Total formal votes		24,852	98.8	
Informal votes		297	1.2	
Turnout		25,149	94.7	
Labor hold		Swing	+3.3	

=== Elections in the 1950s ===
==== 1959 ====
1959 New South Wales state election: Parramatta
Party	Candidate	Votes	%	±%
Labor	Dan Mahoney	13,647	53.9	
Liberal	William Pickard	10,850	42.8	
Democratic Labor	Carlyle Dalgleish	842	3.3	
Total formal votes		25,339	98.6	
Informal votes		354	1.4	
Turnout		25,693	95.2	
Two-party-preferred result
Labor	Dan Mahoney	13,815	54.5	
Liberal	William Pickard	11,524	45.5	
Labor gain from Liberal		Swing		

==== 1956 ====
1956 New South Wales state election: Parramatta
Party	Candidate	Votes	%	±%
Liberal	Jim Clough	13,423	52.1	+4.3
Labor	Kevin Morgan	12,344	47.9	−2.8
Total formal votes		25,767	98.5	+0.3
Informal votes		381	1.5	−0.3
Turnout		26,148	94.1	−0.4
Liberal gain from Labor		Swing	+3.6	

==== 1953 ====
1953 New South Wales state election: Parramatta
Party	Candidate	Votes	%	±%
Labor	Kevin Moran	11,403	50.7	
Liberal	Arthur Butterell	10,746	47.8	
Independent	Edward Harding	333	1.5	
Total formal votes		22,482	98.2	
Informal votes		410	1.8	
Turnout		22,892	94.5	
Two-party-preferred result
Labor	Kevin Moran	11,578	51.5	
Liberal	Arthur Butterell	10,904	48.5	
Labor gain from Liberal		Swing		

==== 1950 ====
1950 New South Wales state election: Parramatta
Party	Candidate	Votes	%	±%
Liberal	George Gollan	13,800	58.7	
Labor	Louis O'Neil	9,689	41.3	
Total formal votes		23,489	98.4	
Informal votes		378	1.6	
Turnout		23,867	94.0	
Liberal hold		Swing		

=== Elections in the 1940s ===
==== 1947 ====
1947 New South Wales state election: Parramatta
Party	Candidate	Votes	%	±%
Liberal	George Gollan	13,263	53.8	+6.2
Labor	William Browne	7,385	30.0	−15.5
Independent	Charles Brown	3,996	16.2	+16.2
Total formal votes		24,644	98.5	+1.0
Informal votes		382	1.5	−1.0
Turnout		25,026	95.0	+2.5
Liberal hold		Swing	N/A	

- Preferences were not distributed.

==== 1944 ====
1944 New South Wales state election: Parramatta
Party	Candidate	Votes	%	±%
Democratic	George Gollan	9,998	47.6	−6.3
Labor	Arthur Treble	9,561	45.5	−0.7
Independent	William Long	1,458	6.9	+6.9
Total formal votes		21,017	97.5	0.0
Informal votes		527	2.5	0.0
Turnout		21,544	92.5	−1.1
Two-party-preferred result
Democratic	George Gollan	10,677	50.8	−3.0
Labor	Arthur Treble	13,340	49.2	+3.0
Democratic hold		Swing	−3.0	

==== 1941 ====
1941 New South Wales state election: Parramatta
Party	Candidate	Votes	%	±%
United Australia	George Gollan	10,729	53.8	
Labor	Albert Rowe	9,195	46.2	
Total formal votes		19,924	97.5	
Informal votes		504	2.5	
Turnout		20,428	93.6	
United Australia hold		Swing		

=== Elections in the 1930s ===
==== 1938 ====
1938 New South Wales state election: Parramatta
Party	Candidate	Votes	%	±%
United Australia	George Gollan	12,878	61.1	+2.8
Labor	Albert Rowe	8,203	38.9	−0.1
Total formal votes		21,081	97.9	−0.4
Informal votes		445	2.1	+0.4
Turnout		21,526	96.5	0.0
United Australia hold		Swing	N/A	

==== 1935 ====
1935 New South Wales state election: Parramatta
Party	Candidate	Votes	%	±%
United Australia	George Gollan	11,854	58.3	+3.3
Labor (NSW)	Joseph Byrne	7,928	39.0	+1.8
Communist	William Beck	546	2.7	+1.7
Total formal votes		20,328	98.3	+1.8
Informal votes		358	1.7	−1.8
Turnout		20,686	96.5	−1.2
United Australia hold		Swing	N/A	

- Preferences were not distributed.

==== 1932 ====
1932 New South Wales state election: Parramatta
Party	Candidate	Votes	%	±%
United Australia	George Gollan	10,696	55.0	+11.8
Labor (NSW)	Joseph Byrne	7,232	37.2	−19.0
Federal Labor	Albert Rowe	1,112	5.7	+5.7
Independent	George Mobbs	214	1.1	+1.1
Communist	Frederick Bateman	196	1.0	+0.4
Total formal votes		19,450	96.5	−1.5
Informal votes		707	3.5	+1.5
Turnout		20,157	97.7	+2.1
United Australia gain from Labor (NSW)		Swing	N/A	

- Preferences were not distributed.

==== 1930 ====
1930 New South Wales state election: Parramatta
Party	Candidate	Votes	%	±%
Labor	Joseph Byrne	10,351	56.2	
Nationalist	Herbert Lloyd (defeated)	7,945	43.2	
Communist	Wilfred Mountjoy	112	0.6	
Total formal votes		18,408	98.0	
Informal votes		379	2.0	
Turnout		18,787	95.6	
Labor gain from Nationalist		Swing		

=== Elections in the 1920s ===
==== 1929 by-election ====
1929 Parramatta by-election Saturday 23 February
Party	Candidate	Votes	%	±%
Nationalist	Herbert Lloyd	7,099	52.27	
Labor	Jack Hooke	6,258	46.08	
Ind. Nationalist	Herbert Bowles	225	1.66	
Total formal votes		13,582	99.49	
Informal votes		70	0.51	
Turnout		13,652	71.80	
Nationalist hold		Swing		

Albert Bruntnell (Nationalist) died.

==== 1927 ====
This section is an excerpt from 1927 New South Wales state election § Parramatta

1927 New South Wales state election: Parramatta
Party	Candidate	Votes	%	±%
Nationalist	Albert Bruntnell	9,236	62.0	
Labor	Alfred Warton	5,668	38.0	
Total formal votes		14,904	98.4	
Informal votes		239	1.6	
Turnout		15,143	84.2	
Nationalist win		(new seat)		

==== 1925 ====
This section is an excerpt from 1925 New South Wales state election § Parramatta

1925 New South Wales state election: Parramatta
Party	Candidate	Votes	%	±%
Quota		9,426		
Labor	Jack Lang (elected 1)	16,650	44.2	+3.0
Labor	Bill Ely (elected 3)	1,964	5.2	+2.6
Labor	George Wrench	272	0.7	+0.7
Nationalist	Albert Bruntnell (elected 2)	13,053	34.6	−8.4
Nationalist	Thomas Morrow (defeated)	2,841	7.5	+4.8
Nationalist	George Folkard	1,759	4.7	+4.7
Protestant Labour	William Chalson	515	1.4	+1.4
Independent	Albert Jones	393	1.0	+1.0
Majority Labor	Cecil Robinson	180	0.5	+0.5
Independent	Francis Silverstone	74	0.2	+0.2
Total formal votes		37,701	97.3	+0.9
Informal votes		1,038	2.7	−0.9
Turnout		38,739	71.0	−0.4
Party total votes
Labor		18,886	50.1	+5.7
Nationalist		17,653	46.8	−6.8
Protestant Labour		515	1.4	+1.4
Independent	Albert Jones	393	1.0	+1.0
Majority Labor		180	0.5	+0.5
Independent	Francis Silverstone	74	0.2	+0.2

==== 1922 ====
This section is an excerpt from 1922 New South Wales state election § Parramatta

1922 New South Wales state election: Parramatta
Party	Candidate	Votes	%	±%
Quota		7,837		
Nationalist	Albert Bruntnell (elected 1)	13,468	43.0	+7.2
Nationalist	Leicester Simpson	2,164	6.9	+6.9
Nationalist	Thomas Morrow (elected 3)	854	2.7	+2.7
Nationalist	Charles Willoughby	330	1.0	+1.0
Labor	Jack Lang (elected 2)	12,906	41.2	−8.3
Labor	Bill Ely (defeated)	821	2.6	+0.3
Labor	George Harrison	185	0.6	+0.6
Independent Labor	Saxon Hurst	347	1.1	+1.1
Independent Labor	James Boughey	158	0.5	+0.5
Independent	John Blake	112	0.4	+0.4
Total formal votes		31,345	96.4	+4.7
Informal votes		1,183	3.6	−4.7
Turnout		32,528	71.4	+14.3
Party total votes
Nationalist		16,816	53.6	+15.0
Labor		13,912	44.4	−8.1
Independent Labor	Saxon Hurst	347	1.1	+1.1
Independent Labor	James Boughey	158	0.5	+0.5
Independent	John Blake	112	0.4	+0.4

==== 1920 ====
This section is an excerpt from 1920 New South Wales state election § Parramatta

1920 New South Wales state election: Parramatta
Party	Candidate	Votes	%	±%
Quota		5,119		
Labor	Jack Lang (elected 1)	10,134	49.5	
Labor	Bill Ely (elected 3)	477	2.3	
Labor	Edward Pomfret	128	0.6	
Nationalist	Albert Bruntnell (elected 2)	7,325	35.8	
Nationalist	Frederick Parkes	572	2.8	
Democratic	Alexander Finn	778	3.8	
Soldiers & Citizens	James Thomson	418	2.0	
Soldiers & Citizens	Francis Silverstone	179	0.9	
Soldiers & Citizens	Richard Yeend	97	0.5	
Independent	Harry Moss	366	1.8	
Total formal votes		20,474	91.7	
Informal votes		1,846	8.3	
Turnout		22,320	57.1	
Party total votes
Labor		10,739	52.5	
Nationalist		7,897	38.6	
Democratic		778	3.8	
Soldiers & Citizens		694	3.4	
Independent	Harry Moss	366	1.8	

=== Elections in the 1910s ===
==== 1917 ====
This section is an excerpt from 1917 New South Wales state election § Parramatta

1917 New South Wales state election: Parramatta
Party	Candidate	Votes	%	±%
Nationalist	Albert Bruntnell	5,382	58.6	+10.7
Labor	Jock Garden	3,772	41.1	−2.1
Independent	John Strachan	26	0.3	+0.3
Total formal votes		9,180	98.9	−0.1
Informal votes		105	1.1	+0.1
Turnout		9,285	64.9	−9.5
Nationalist hold		Swing	+10.7	

==== 1916 by-election ====
1916 Parramatta by-election
Party	Candidate	Votes	%	±%
Liberal Reform	Albert Bruntnell	5,156	55.87	
Labor	Frank Walford	4,073	44.13	
Total formal votes		9,229	100	
Informal votes		0	0.00	
Turnout		9,229	72.43 (Note: estimate based on an electoral roll of 12,400 at the 1913 election.)	
Liberal Reform hold		Swing		

==== 1913 ====
1913 New South Wales state election: Parramatta
Party	Candidate	Votes	%	±%
Liberal Reform	Tom Moxham	4,379	47.9	
Labor	Frank Walford	3,944	43.2	
Independent Liberal	Walter Jago	815	8.9	
Total formal votes		9,138	99.0	
Informal votes		89	1.0	
Turnout		9,227	74.4	
Second round result
Liberal Reform	Tom Moxham	5,010	51.0	
Labor	Frank Walford	4,818	49.0	
Total formal votes		9,828	99.5	
Informal votes		46	0.5	
Turnout		9,874	79.6	
Liberal Reform hold				

==== 1910 ====
This section is an excerpt from 1910 New South Wales state election § Parramatta

1910 New South Wales state election: Parramatta
Party	Candidate	Votes	%	±%
Liberal Reform	Tom Moxham	3,988	55.7	
Labour	Dowell O'Reilly	3,166	44.3	
Total formal votes		7,154	98.1	
Informal votes		142	1.9	
Turnout		7,296	76.8	

=== Elections in the 1900s ===
==== 1907 ====
This section is an excerpt from 1907 New South Wales state election § Parramatta

1907 New South Wales state election: Parramatta
Party	Candidate	Votes	%	±%
Liberal Reform	Tom Moxham	2,920	51.8	
Independent	Edward Terry	1,509	26.4	
Labour	Arthur Rae	1,242	21.8	
Total formal votes		5,711	95.3	
Informal votes		285	4.7	
Turnout		5,996	74.5	
Liberal Reform hold				

==== 1904 ====
This section is an excerpt from 1904 New South Wales state election § Parramatta

1904 New South Wales state election: Parramatta
Party	Candidate	Votes	%	±%
Liberal Reform	Tom Moxham	3,422	64.37	
Independent	William Ferris	1,849	34.78	
Labour	Charles Summerhayes	45	0.85	
Total formal votes		5,316	99.11	
Informal votes		48	0.89	
Turnout		5,364	68.06	
Liberal Reform hold				

Parramatta was expanded to include part of the abolished seat of Ryde. The member for Parramatta was Tom Moxham (Liberal Reform). The member for Ryde was Edward Terry (Independent Liberal) who did not contest the election.

==== 1901 ====
This section is an excerpt from 1901 New South Wales state election § Parramatta

1901 New South Wales state election: Parramatta
Party	Candidate	Votes	%	±%
Liberal Reform	Tom Moxham	1,234	57.02	
Progressive	William Ferris	930	42.98	
Total formal votes		2,164	99.54	
Informal votes		10	0.46	
Turnout		2,174	80.28	
Liberal Reform gain from Progressive				

=== Elections in the 1890s ===
==== 1898 by-election ====
1898 Parramatta by-election Wednesday 26 October
Party	Candidate	Votes	%	±%
Protectionist	William Ferris (re-elected)	1,035	54.8	+10.0
Free Trade	Dowell O'Reilly	853	45.2	+0.6
Total formal votes		1,888	99.7	+0.4
Informal votes		5	0.3	−0.4
Turnout		1,893	67.6	−2.6
Member changed to Protectionist from Ind. Protectionist		Swing		

The election of William Ferris was overturned by the Election and Qualifications Committee due to "many gross irregularities". Ferris was not the endorsed candidate for the 1898 election, however was endorsed for the by-election.

==== 1898 ====
This section is an excerpt from 1898 New South Wales colonial election § Parramatta

1898 New South Wales colonial election: Parramatta
Party	Candidate	Votes	%	±%
Independent Federalist	William Ferris	747	44.8	
Free Trade	Dowell O'Reilly	743	44.6	
National Federal	Edwin Brown	168	10.1	
Independent Federalist	Joseph Withers	9	0.5	
Total formal votes		1,667	99.3	
Informal votes		12	0.7	
Turnout		1,679	70.2	
Independent Federalist gain from Free Trade				

==== 1895 ====
This section is an excerpt from 1895 New South Wales colonial election § Parramatta

1895 New South Wales colonial election: Parramatta
Party	Candidate	Votes	%	±%
Free Trade	Dowell O'Reilly	956	56.10	
Independent	Hugh Taylor	748	43.90	
Total formal votes		1,704	99.53	
Informal votes		8	0.47	
Turnout		1,712	81.33	
Free Trade hold		Swing		

==== 1894 ====
This section is an excerpt from 1894 New South Wales colonial election § Parramatta

1894 New South Wales colonial election: Parramatta
Party	Candidate	Votes	%	±%
Ind. Free Trade	Dowell O'Reilly	664	36.6	
Free Trade	Hugh Taylor	627	34.6	−6.6
Protectionist	William Ferris	520	28.7	−1.7
Ind. Free Trade	William Garrett	2	0.1	
Ind. Free Trade	James Thomas	1	0.1	
Total formal votes		1,814	98.9	+0.3
Informal votes		21	1.1	−0.3
Turnout		1,835	84.2	+8.69
Ind. Free Trade gain from Free Trade				

Hugh Taylor (Free Trade) was the sitting member for Parramatta.

==== 1891 ====
This section is an excerpt from 1891 New South Wales colonial election § Parramatta

1891 New South Wales colonial election: Parramatta Wednesday 17 June
Party	Candidate	Votes	%	±%
Free Trade	Hugh Taylor (re-elected)	664	41.2	−31.5
Protectionist	William Ferris	489	30.3	+3.0
Free Trade	Tom Moxham	459	28.5	+28.5
Total formal votes		1,612	98.6	+0.6
Informal votes		23	1.4	−0.6
Turnout		1,635	75.5	+12.2
Free Trade hold				

=== Elections in the 1880s ===
==== 1889 ====
This section is an excerpt from 1889 New South Wales colonial election § Parramatta

1889 New South Wales colonial election: Parramatta Saturday 9 February
Party	Candidate	Votes	%	±%
Free Trade	Hugh Taylor (elected)	1,022	72.64	
Protectionist	Charles Byrnes	385	27.36	
Total formal votes		1,407	97.98	
Informal votes		29	2.02	
Turnout		1,436	63.29	
Free Trade hold				

==== 1887 ====
This section is an excerpt from 1887 New South Wales colonial election § Parramatta

1887 New South Wales colonial election: Parramatta Thursday 3 February
Party	Candidate	Votes	%	±%
Free Trade	Hugh Taylor (re-elected)	unopposed		

==== 1885 ====
This section is an excerpt from 1885 New South Wales colonial election § Parramatta

1885 New South Wales colonial election: Parramatta Friday 16 October
Candidate	Votes	%
Hugh Taylor (re-elected)	922	69.8
William Ferris	399	30.2
Total formal votes	1,321	97.0
Informal votes	41	3.0
Turnout	1,362	72.6

==== 1882 ====
This section is an excerpt from 1882 New South Wales colonial election § Parramatta

1882 New South Wales colonial election: Parramatta Saturday 2 December
Candidate	Votes	%
Hugh Taylor (elected)	595	51.5
James Farnell (defeated)	364	31.5
Cyrus Fuller	196	17.0
Total formal votes	1,155	97.2
Informal votes	33	2.8
Turnout	1,189	77.3

James Farnell was a sitting member for St Leonards and went on to successfully contest New England.

==== 1880 ====
This section is an excerpt from 1880 New South Wales colonial election § Parramatta

1880 New South Wales colonial election: Parramatta Thursday 18 November
Candidate	Votes	%
Charles Byrnes (elected)	601	51.2
Hugh Taylor (defeated)	574	48.9
Total formal votes	1,175	97.1
Informal votes	35	2.9
Turnout	1,210	84.7
	(1 less seat)	

The other siting member William Long did not contest the election.

=== Elections in the 1870s ===
==== 1877 ====
This section is an excerpt from 1877 New South Wales colonial election § Parramatta

1877 New South Wales colonial election: Parramatta Saturday 27 October
Candidate	Votes	%
Hugh Taylor (re-elected 1)	571	33.9
William Long (re-elected 2)	426	25.3
Walter Cooper	370	22.0
George Young	265	15.8
John Bergan	51	3.0
Total formal votes	1,683	98.9
Informal votes	19	1.1
Turnout	988	85.7

The other sitting member Charles Byrnes did not contest the election. William Long was the member for Central Cumberland.

==== 1876 by-election ====
1876 Parramatta by-election Thursday 20 April
Candidate	Votes	%
Hugh Taylor (elected)	455	53.4
George Young	397	46.6
Informal votes	852	100.0
Informal votes	0	0.0
Turnout	852	68.7

Hugh Taylor resigned because a contract he had may have been an office of profit under the crown.

==== 1874 ====
This section is an excerpt from 1874-75 New South Wales colonial election § Parramatta

1874–75 New South Wales colonial election: Parramatta Thursday 10 December 1874
Candidate	Votes	%
Hugh Taylor (re-elected 1)	480	40.8
Charles Byrnes (elected 2)	361	30.7
James Farnell (defeated)	335	28.5
Total formal votes	1,176	100.0
Informal votes	0	0.0
Turnout	898	61.0

==== 1872 by-election ====
1872 Parramatta by-election Monday 20 May
Candidate	Votes	%
Hugh Taylor (elected)	Unopposed	

Hugh Taylor resigned because a contract he had may have been an office of profit under the crown.

==== 1872 ====
This section is an excerpt from 1872 New South Wales colonial election § Parramatta

1872 New South Wales colonial election: Parramatta Tuesday 20 February
Candidate	Votes	%
James Farnell (re-elected 1)	468	35.6
Hugh Taylor (elected 2)	451	34.4
James Byrnes (defeated)	394	30.0
Total formal votes	1,313	100.0
Informal votes	0	0.0
Turnout	746	52.3

=== Elections in the 1860s ===
==== 1869 ====
This section is an excerpt from 1869-70 New South Wales colonial election § Parramatta

1869–70 New South Wales colonial election: Parramatta Friday 17 December 1869
Candidate	Votes	%
James Byrnes (re-elected 1)	468	31.9
James Farnell (re-elected 2)	455	31.0
Hugh Taylor	274	18.7
George Oakes	270	18.4
Total formal votes	1,467	100.0
Informal votes	0	0.0
Turnout	900	70.7

==== 1864 ====
This section is an excerpt from 1864–65 New South Wales colonial election § Parramatta

1864–65 New South Wales colonial election: Parramatta Thursday 24 November 1864
Candidate	Votes	%
James Byrnes (elected 1)	354	28.8
James Farnell (elected 2)	342	27.8
John Lackey (defeated)	272	22.1
Arthur Holroyd (defeated)	247	20.1
Frederick Birmingham	16	1.3
Total formal votes	1,231	100.0
Informal votes	0	0.0
Turnout	636	51.5

==== 1861 by-election ====
1861 Parramatta by-election Wednesday 10 April
Candidate	Votes	%
Arthur Holroyd (elected)	275	49.1
Charles Kemp	244	43.6
John West	41	7.3
Total formal votes	560	100.0
Informal votes	0	0.0
Turnout	560	45.9

James Byrnes resigned stating that to be placed second behind John Lackey was a decision by the majority of voters that he was not fit to serve them.

==== 1860 ====
This section is an excerpt from 1860 New South Wales colonial election § Parramatta

1860 New South Wales colonial election: Parramatta Saturday 8 December
Candidate	Votes	%
John Lackey (elected 1)	418	38.9
James Byrnes (re-elected 2)	368	34.2
George Oakes (defeated)	290	27.0
Total formal votes	1,076	100.0
Informal votes	0	0.0
Turnout	1,076	44.1

=== Elections in the 1850s ===
==== 1859 ====
This section is an excerpt from 1859 New South Wales colonial election § Parramatta

1859 New South Wales colonial election: Parramatta Saturday 18 June
Candidate	Votes	%
James Byrnes (re-elected 1)	380	37.7
George Oakes (re-elected 2)	352	34.9
Arthur Holroyd	277	27.5
Total formal votes	1,009	100.0
Informal votes	0	0.0
Turnout	690	57.1

==== 1858 ====
This section is an excerpt from 1858 New South Wales colonial election § Parramatta

1858 New South Wales colonial election: Parramatta 19 January
Candidate	Votes	%
George Oakes (re-elected 1)	333	38.0
James Byrnes (re-elected 2)	326	37.2
James Pye	218	24.9
Total formal votes	877	100.0
Informal votes	0	0.0
Turnout	877	54.5

The other sitting member Henry Parker did not contest the election. James Byrnes was the member for Cumberland (South Riding). James Pye petitioned against the election alleging his supporters had been intimidated from voting, however this was dismissed as unproven.

==== 1856 by-election ====
1856 Parramatta by-election Saturday 11 October
Candidate	Votes	%
Henry Parker (re-elected)	279	51.9
James Byrnes	259	48.1
Total formal votes	538	100.0
Informal votes	0	0.0
Turnout	538	71.1

The by-election was caused by the appointment of Henry Parker as Premier and Colonial Secretary, forming the Parker ministry.

==== 1856 ====
This section is an excerpt from 1856 New South Wales colonial election § Parramatta

1856 New South Wales colonial election: Parramatta
Candidate	Votes	%
Henry Parker (elected 1)	310	30.2
George Oakes (elected 2)	303	29.5
James Byrnes	222	21.6
Andrew Murray	191	18.6
Total formal votes	1,026	100.0
Informal votes	0	0.0
Turnout	550	72.7

Polling was conducted on 29 March 1856. Both Parker and Oakes had served in the old Legislative Council, Oakes representing Town of Parramatta and Parker as an appointed member.
