= List of mayors and lord mayors of Parramatta =

Lord Mayor of Parramatta
- Incumbent; Cr Cameron Maclean since 28 September 2026
- Style: The Right Worshipful Lord Mayor
- Appointer: City of Parramatta Council
- Term length: 1 year (1862–2016) 2 years (2017–date)
- Inaugural holder: John Williams (Mayor); Alan Hyam (Lord Mayor)
- Formation: 2 January 1862 (as Mayor); 12 December 1988 (as Lord Mayor)
- Deputy: Cr Kellie Darley
- Website: City of Parramatta | Lord Mayor and Councillors

This is a list of the mayors and lord mayors of City of Parramatta and its predecessors, a local government area of New South Wales, Australia. The official title of lord mayors while holding office is: The Right Worshipful Lord Mayor of Parramatta.

The current lord mayor is Cr Cameron Maclean, who was elected by a vote of councillors on 28 September 2026.

== Development of the office ==
First incorporated in January 1861 as the "Municipality of Parramatta", the council became known as the "Borough of Parramatta" on 23 December 1867 following the enactment of the Municipalities Act, 1867, and became a Municipality again following the 1906 Local Government Act. On 27 October 1938, the Local Government (City of Parramatta) Act was passed by the Parliament of New South Wales and proclaimed by the Governor, Lord Wakehurst, making the town the "City of Parramatta".

From 1 January 1949 the "City of Parramatta" was re-formed following the passing of the Local Government (Areas) Act 1948, when the councils of Ermington and Rydalmere (incorporated 1891), Dundas (incorporated 1889) and Granville (incorporated 1885) were merged into the council area. The Department of Local Government refused requests from Parramatta in 1948 and 1949 to be granted the title of "Lord Mayor".

In recognition of the town of Parramatta's bicentennial (coinciding with Australia's Bicentenary), the title of "Lord Mayor" was granted on 12 December 1988 by Queen Elizabeth II on the recommendation of Premier Nick Greiner. This made Parramatta the third Australian city that was not a capital to receive such an honour, after Newcastle and Wollongong.

A 2015 review of local government boundaries by the NSW Government Independent Pricing and Regulatory Tribunal recommended that the City of Parramatta be reformed, adding areas from several adjoining councils. The NSW Government subsequently proposed a merger of parts of Parramatta (Woodville Ward), Auburn and Holroyd and a second merger of parts of the rest of Parramatta and parts of Auburn, The Hills, Hornsby, and Holroyd to form a new council.

On 12 May 2016, Parramatta City Council was abolished by the NSW Government. Parts of Auburn City Council (south of the M4 Western Motorway) and Parramatta City Council (Woodville Ward), and Holroyd City Council merged to form the Cumberland Council as a new local government area and the remainder of the Parramatta City Council, Auburn City Council north of the M4 Western Motorway (including parts of the Sydney Olympic Park), and small parts of Hornsby Shire, Holroyd and The Hills Shire were merged into the reformed "City of Parramatta Council".

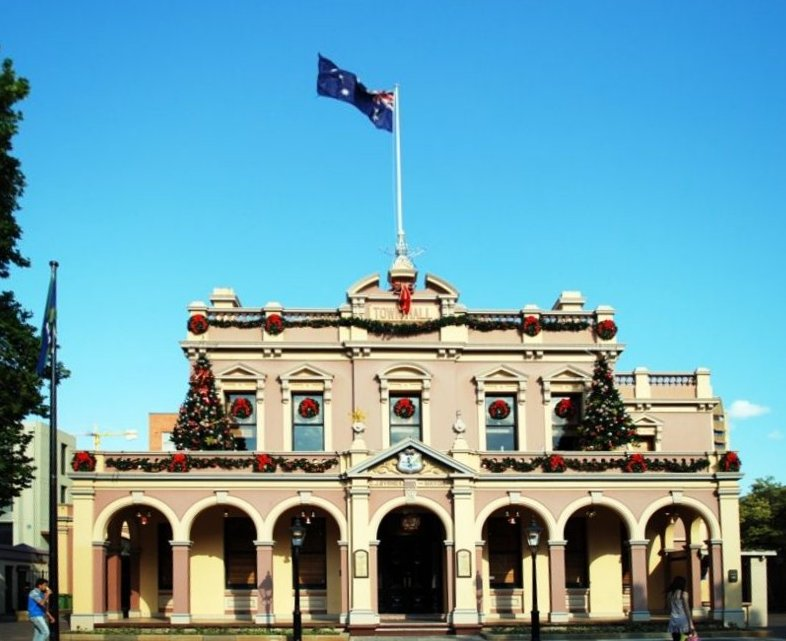
Parramatta Town Hall, designed by George Allen Mansfield, has been the seat of the council since 1883.

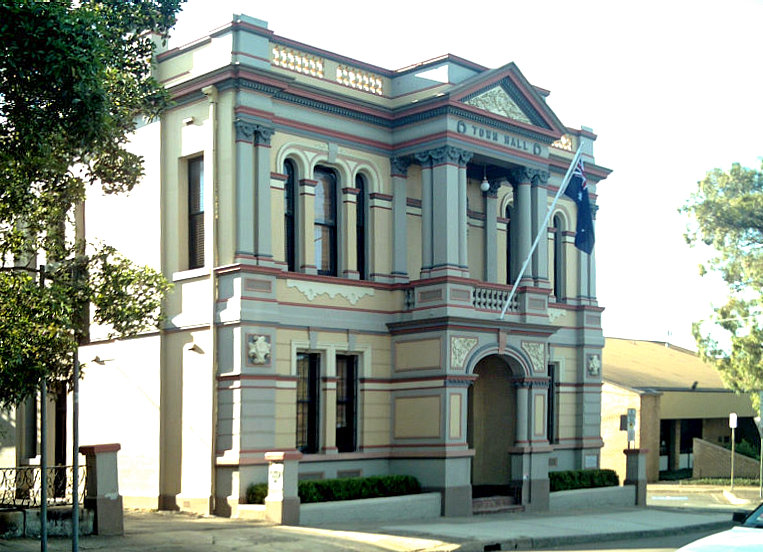
Granville Town Hall was the seat of Granville Municipal Council from 1888 to 1948 and the City of Parramatta from 1949 to 1958. It is now a heritage-listed community centre and library located in Cumberland Council area.

On 22 May 2023, Parramatta City Council became the first council in Australia to elect a Mayor of Indian Origin.

== List of incumbents ==
=== Mayors of the Municipality/Borough/Municipality/City of Parramatta (1861–1948) ===
Mayor	Term	Notes
John Williams	2 January 1862 – 3 February 1862	
James Byrnes	3 February 1862 – 17 February 1866	
James Pye	17 February 1866 – 18 February 1867	
Richard Harper	18 February 1867 – 14 February 1868	
Thomas Wheaton Bowden	14 February 1868 – 8 February 1869	
John Good	8 February 1869 – 11 February 1870	
Charles Byrnes	11 February 1870 – 14 February 1871	
Hugh Taylor	14 February 1871 – 13 February 1874	
Samuel Burge	13 February 1874 – 10 February 1875	
Charles Byrnes	10 February 1875 – 14 February 1882	
Joseph Booth	14 February 1882 – 13 February 1884	
Frederick Charles Cox	13 February 1884 – 10 February 1885	
Joseph Smith	10 February 1885 – 8 February 1886	
Charles Byrnes	8 February 1886 – 13 February 1889	
Frank Beames	13 February 1889 – 11 February 1890	
William Ferris	11 February 1890 – 12 February 1891	
Frank Beames	12 February 1891 – 8 February 1892	
Charles Byrnes	8 February 1892 – 20 February 1894	
Joseph W. Withers	22 February 1894 – 13 February 1895	
Charles Byrnes	13 February 1895 – 14 February 1896	
William Ferris	14 February 1896 – 10 February 1897	
Tom Moxham	10 February 1897 – 13 February 1901	
William Peter Noller	13 February 1901 – 13 February 1902	
Edward Pascoe Pearce	13 February 1902 – 12 February 1903	
William Peter Noller	12 February 1903 – 11 February 1907	
John Saunders	11 February 1907 – 30 July 1907	
William Peter Noller	6 August 1907 – 10 February 1909	
John Waugh	10 February 1909 – 9 February 1911	
Walter Francis Jago	9 February 1911 – 12 February 1912	
Arthur Henry Collett	12 February 1912 – 9 February 1914	
James Henry Graham	9 February 1914 – 7 February 1916	
Francis John Thomas	7 February 1916 – 9 July 1917	
Robert Henry De Low	9 July 1917 – 4 February 1918	
James Whitmore Hill	4 February 1918 – 10 February 1919	
Leicester Stuart Anderson Simpson	10 February 1919 – 11 December 1922	
Harry Charles George Moss	11 December 1922 – 10 December 1923	
William Peter Noller	10 December 1923 – 19 December 1927	
Arthur Henry Collett	19 December 1927 – 20 August 1930	
Henry Ohlsen	25 August 1930 – 14 January 1936	
George Henry Prudames	24 January 1936 – 14 December 1937	
William John Irwin	14 December 1937 – 4 December 1939	
Philip Henry Jeffery	4 December 1939 – 9 December 1946	
Harold Mervyn Symonds	9 December 1946 – 31 December 1948	

=== Mayors/Lord mayors of the City of Parramatta (1949–2016) ===
#	Portrait	Mayor	Party	Term start	Term end
1		Eric Arthur Mobbs	Independent	1 January 1949	December 1953
2		Hedley Victor Horwood	Independent	December 1953	December 1955
3		Edward Allen Hunt	Independent	December 1955	9 December 1957
4		Dan Mahoney	Labor	9 December 1957	December 1958
(1)		Eric Arthur Mobbs	Independent	December 1958	14 December 1959
5		Alfred Robert Cayley Thomas	Independent	14 December 1959	December 1961
6		Pat Flaherty	Labor	December 1961	December 1962
7		Reginald van Nooten	Independent	December 1962	December 1964
(5)		Alfred Robert Cayley Thomas	Independent	December 1964	December 1965
(7)		Reginald van Nooten	Independent	December 1965	December 1966
8		Barry Wilde	Labor	December 1966	1974
9		Brian Wood	Independent	1974	September 1974
10		Alan Hyam	Independent	September 1974	September 1978
11		Keith John McKinnon	Independent	September 1978	September 1979
12		Stanley Charles Dickson	Independent	September 1979	September 1983
13		John Books	Independent Liberal	September 1983	September 1984
14		Paul Elliott	Labor	September 1984	September 1985
(10)		Alan Hyam	Independent	September 1985	12 December 1988
No.	Portrait	Lord Mayor	Party	Term start	Term end
(10)		Alan Hyam	Independent	12 December 1988	September 1991
15		John Haines	Independent	September 1991	September 1995
16		Paul Garrard	Labor	September 1995	September 1996
(13)		John Books	Independent Liberal	September 1996	September 1997
(15)		John Haines	Independent	September 1997	September 1998
(16)		Paul Garrard	Labor	September 1998	September 1999
17		David Borger	Labor	September 1999	September 2000
18		Lorraine Wearne	Independent	September 2000	September 2001
(15)		John Haines	Independent	September 2001	September 2002
(16)		Paul Garrard	Labor	September 2002	September 2004
19		Julia Finn	Labor	September 2004	September 2005
20		David Borger	Labor	September 2005	September 2007
21		Paul Barry Barber	Labor	September 2007	29 September 2008
22		Tony Issa	Liberal	29 September 2008	September 2009
(16)		Paul Garrard	Independent	September 2009	29 September 2010
23		John Chedid	Liberal	29 September 2010	27 September 2011
(18)		Lorraine Wearne	Independent	27 September 2011	25 September 2012
(23)		John Chedid	Liberal	25 September 2012	29 September 2014
24		Scott Lloyd	Liberal	29 September 2014	30 September 2015
(16)		Paul Garrard	Our Local Community	30 September 2015	12 May 2016

=== Lord mayors of the City of Parramatta Council (2016–present) ===
No.	Portrait	Lord Mayor (Ward)	Party	Term start	Term end
N/A		Amanda Chadwick (Administrator)		12 May 2016	25 September 2017
25		Andrew Wilson	Our Local Community	25 September 2017	23 September 2019
26		Bob Dwyer	Liberal	23 September 2019	27 September 2021
27		Steven Issa	Liberal	27 September 2021	10 January 2022
28		Donna Davis (Epping)	Labor	10 January 2022	22 May 2023
29		Sameer Pandey (Parramatta)	Labor	22 May 2023	25 September 2023
30		Pierre Esber (Dundas)	Labor	25 September 2023	14 September 2024
31		Martin Zaiter (Parramatta)	Liberal	14 October 2024	28 September 2026
32		Cameron Maclean (Epping)	Labor	28 September 2026	incumbent

== See also ==
- City of Auburn
- Municipality of Granville
- Municipality of Dundas
- Municipality of Ermington and Rydalmere
