= 1898 Parramatta colonial by-election =

Election result for Parramatta, New South Wales, Australia

A by-election was held for the New South Wales Legislative Assembly electorate of Parramatta on 26 October 1898 as the election of William Ferris, with a margin of 4 votes, was overturned by the Election and Qualifications Committee due to "many gross irregularities".

== Dates ==
Date	Event
27 July 1898	1898 New South Wales election
1 September 1898	Dowell O'Reilly filed a petition against the election.
18 October 1898	Parramatta election declared void.
19 October 1898	Writ of election issued by the Speaker of the Legislative Assembly.
24 October 1898	Nominations
26 October 1898	Polling day
31 October 1898	Return of writ

== Results ==
1898 Parramatta by-election Wednesday 26 October
Party	Candidate	Votes	%	±%
Protectionist	William Ferris (re-elected)	1,035	54.8	+10.0
Free Trade	Dowell O'Reilly	853	45.2	+0.6
Total formal votes		1,888	99.7	+0.4
Informal votes		5	0.3	−0.4
Turnout		1,893	67.6	−2.6
Member changed to Protectionist from Ind. Protectionist		Swing		

== See also ==
- Electoral results for the district of Parramatta
- List of New South Wales state by-elections
