= 1916 Parramatta state by-election =

Election result for Parramatta, New South Wales, Australia

A by-election was held for the New South Wales Legislative Assembly electorate of Parramatta on 12 February 1916 following the death of sitting Nationalist Party member, Tom Moxham.

== Results ==
1916 Parramatta by-election
Party	Candidate	Votes	%	±%
Liberal Reform	Albert Bruntnell	5,156	55.87	
Labor	Frank Walford	4,073	44.13	
Total formal votes		9,229	100	
Informal votes		0	0.00	
Turnout		9,229	72.43 (Note: estimate based on an electoral roll of 12,400 at the 1913 election.)	
Liberal Reform hold		Swing		

== See also ==
- Electoral results for the district of Parramatta
- List of New South Wales state by-elections
