= 1994 Parramatta state by-election =

Election result for Parramatta, New South Wales, Australia

A by-election was held for the New South Wales Legislative Assembly electorate of Parramatta on 27 August 1994 following the death of Andrew Ziolkowski (Labor). The Labor candidate was his widow Gabrielle Harrison.

== Results ==
1994 Parramatta state by-election Saturday 27 August
Party	Candidate	Votes	%	±%
Labor	Gabrielle Harrison	16,527	54.9	+10.6
Liberal	Wendy Jones	9,523	31.7	−10.9
Independent	Tony Issa	811	2.7	+2.7
Greens	Miranda Fitzgerald	798	2.6	+2.6
Call to Australia	Bruce Coleman	724	2.4	+2.4
Grey Power	John Verheyen	665	2.2	+2.2
Independent	Charles Malkoun	593	2.0	+2.0
Daylight Saving Extension	Tony de Govrik	324	1.1	+1.1
Independent	John Cogger	125	0.4	+0.4
Total formal votes		30,090	96.3	+6.1
Informal votes		1,169	3.7	−6.1
Turnout		31,259	79.0	−14.9
Two-party-preferred result
Labor	Gabrielle Harrison	18,013	62.0	+9.4
Liberal	Wendy Jones	11,025	38.0	−9.4
Labor hold		Swing	+9.4	

== See also ==
- Electoral results for the district of Parramatta
- List of New South Wales state by-elections
