= 1929 Parramatta state by-election =

Election result for Parramatta, New South Wales, Australia

A by-election was held for the New South Wales Legislative Assembly electorate of Parramatta on 23 February 1929 following the death of Albert Bruntnell (Nationalist).

== Results ==
1929 Parramatta by-election Saturday 23 February
| Party | Candidate | Votes | % | ±% |
|---|---|---|---|---|
| Nationalist | Herbert Lloyd | 7,099 | 52.27 | |
| Labor | Jack Hooke | 6,258 | 46.08 | |
| Ind. Nationalist | Herbert Bowles | 225 | 1.66 | |
| Total formal votes | | 13,582 | 99.49 | |
| Informal votes | | 70 | 0.51 | |
| Turnout | | 13,652 | 71.80 | |
| Nationalist hold | | Swing | | |

== See also ==
- Electoral results for the district of Parramatta
- List of New South Wales state by-elections
