= 1876 Parramatta colonial by-election =

By-election in New South Wales, Australia

A by-election was held for the New South Wales Legislative Assembly electorate of Parramatta on 20 April 1876 caused by the resignation of sitting member Hugh Taylor after he was referred to the Committee of Elections and Qualification as to whether he had a position of profit under the crown as a result of the supply of meat by him to Mr Dunn who in turn had a contract to supply meat to government asylums.

== Dates ==
| Date | Event |
|---|---|
| 24 February 1876 | Question referred to the Committee of Elections and Qualifications. |
| 22 March 1876 | The Committee of Elections and Qualifications reported that Thomas Brown was disqualified from sitting. |
| 31 March 1876 | Hugh Taylor resigned. |
| 1 April 1876 | Writ of election issued by the Speaker of the Legislative Assembly. |
| 18 April 1876 | Nominations |
| 20 April 1876 | Polling day |
| 25 June 1876 | Return of writ |

== Committee of Elections and Qualifications ==
The question of Thomas Brown's eligibility had been referred to the committee on the same day. The Committee found that Thomas Brown was the owner of the Eskbank Colliery, the coal supplied by William Pitt was taken from the Eskbank Colliery and that Thomas Brown had a "direct interest in a contract entered into with the Government by the said William Pitt for the supply of engine coal for the Great Southern and Western Railways" and was therefore disqualified from being a member of the Legislative Assembly.

Taylor resigned after the report on Thomas Brown had been tabled, but before the committee had reported on whether he too was disqualified.

== Results ==
1876 Parramatta by-election Thursday 20 April
| Candidate | Votes | % |
|---|---|---|
| Hugh Taylor (elected) | 455 | 53.4 |
| George Young | 397 | 46.6 |
| Informal votes | 852 | 100.0 |
| Informal votes | 0 | 0.0 |
| Turnout | 852 | 68.7 |

== See also ==
- Electoral results for the district of Parramatta
- List of New South Wales state by-elections
