= 1872 Parramatta colonial by-election =

By-election in New South Wales, Australia

A by-election was held for the New South Wales Legislative Assembly electorate of Parramatta on 20 May 1872 caused by the resignation of sitting member Hugh Taylor immediately after the election as he had received conflicting legal advice as to whether his contract to supply articles to a destitute institution disqualified him from office. He was concerned that the Committee of Elections and Qualifications was hostile to the Parkes ministry which he supported.

== Dates ==
Date	Event
9 May 1872	Writ of election issued by the Speaker of the Legislative Assembly and close of electoral rolls.
20 May 1872	Nominations
22 May 1872	Polling day
11 June 1872	Return of writ

== Results ==
1872 Parramatta by-election Monday 20 May
Candidate	Votes	%
Hugh Taylor (elected)	Unopposed	

== See also ==
- Electoral results for the district of Parramatta
- List of New South Wales state by-elections
