= Arthur H Collett =

Australian politician (1870–1930)

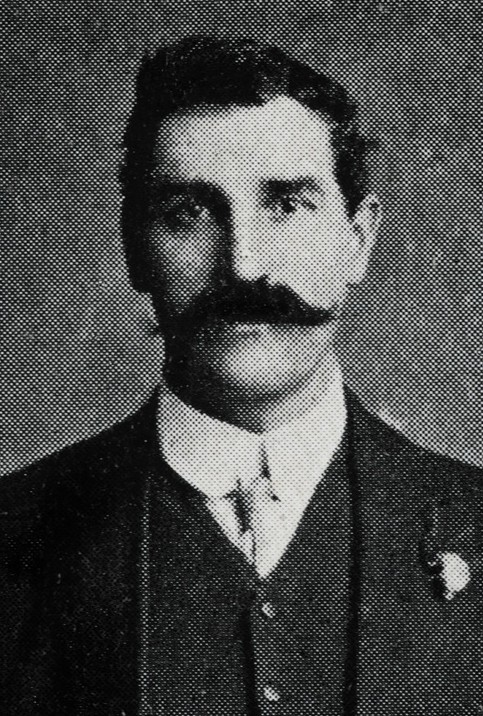

Mayor of Parramatta
- In office 1912–1913
- In office 1928–1930

Personal details
- Born: Arthur Henry Collett; 18 April 1870 Mudgee, Colony of New South Wales
- Died: 20 August 1930 (aged 60) Manly, New South Wales, Australia
- Spouses: Frances Maud Bailey; Georgina Eliza Sarah McDonald
- Children: 9

Arthur Henry Collett (18 April 1870 – 20 August 1930) was an Australian politician who served as Mayor of Parramatta from 1912 to 1913 and 1928 to 1930 in his second term.

His second and last mayoral term came to a sudden end when he died, making him one of the few Mayors of Parramatta to die in office.

== Biography ==
Collett was born in Mudgee during Colonial New South Wales. His father, Henry Collett, was an English soldier and came to Australia with one of the regiments. Later his father joined the Prisons Department and saw service at several New South Wales gaols.

At the age of ten, Collett came to Parramatta with his widowed mother and younger brothers and sisters. He said he helped support his family by selling newspapers at Parramatta Railway Station. He attended Parramatta Public School. On leaving school he went to work at Hudson Bros carriage works at Clyde, where he remained for a few years.

In 1895, he married Frances Maud Bailey at Parramatta and shortly afterwards entered the dairying business, though later on in his life he remarried to Georgina Eliza Sarah McDonald. At the time of his death, he had been conducting a dairy for 35 years. For many years he was a member of the Parramatta Licensing Board. Collett was appointed deputy sheriff at Parramatta three years before his death.

For more than 20 years, he was secretary of the Dairymen's Association and when the recently established Milk Board came into being he was elected unopposed as the metropolitan representative. In February 1903, he was elected unopposed to Parramatta Council as a representative of Gore Ward and had sat continuously in the council for 27 years. During World War I, he worked on behalf of various patriotic funds.

In Parramatta, there is a park named after him called "Collet Park" which opened in 1932 with a memorial dedicated to Collett.

The tablet reads:

Collett Park

In memory of the late Alderman A. H. Collett (Mayor)

This tablet was unveiled by His Excellency Sir Philip Woolcott Game G.B.E, K.C.B., D.S.O Governor of New South Wales on the 1st Day of September, 1932
