= Thomas Morrow (Australian politician) =

Australian politician

- Born: 23 March 1888; Ballintra, County Donegal, Ulster, Ireland
- Died: Sydney, New South Wales, Australia
- Education: Civil Service Training College, Belfast, Ireland
- Occupation: politician
- Years active: 1922–1925
- Known for: member, New South Wales Legislative Assembly
- Political party: Nationalist
- Spouse: Helen Mary Harvey (m. 1914)
- Children: 4 sons
- Parents: Thomas Morrow (father); Elizabeth Hill (mother)

Notes
- He migrated to Australia in January 1913.

Thomas Howard Morrow (23 March 1888 – 20 February 1971) was an Australian politician.

Born in Ballintra in County Donegal in Ulster, Ireland, to farmer Thomas Morrow and Elizabeth Hill, he was educated at the Civil Service Training College in Belfast and worked in the Royal Irish Constabulary (RIC) from 1907 to Dec 1912 before coming to Australia in January 1913. On 21 May 1914 he married Helen Mary Harvey, with whom he had four sons. From 1913 to 1916 he was an attendant at Parramatta Mental Hospital; he then worked for Clyde Engineering Company and then as a labourer at the Darling Harbour railway yards from 1918 to 1920. From 1920 to 1922 he was a watchman. In 1922 Morrow was elected as a Nationalist to the New South Wales Legislative Assembly, representing Parramatta; he was defeated in 1925. After his defeat he became a lime and cement merchant until 1929, ultimately becoming a contractor and health inspector. He served as a Nationalist Party councillor from 1930 until 1931. Morrow died in Sydney in 1971.

New South Wales Legislative Assembly
Preceded by Bill Ely	Member for Parramatta; 1922–1925; Served alongside: Albert Bruntnell, Jack Lang	Succeeded by Bill Ely
