= James Byrnes (Australian politician) =

Australian politician

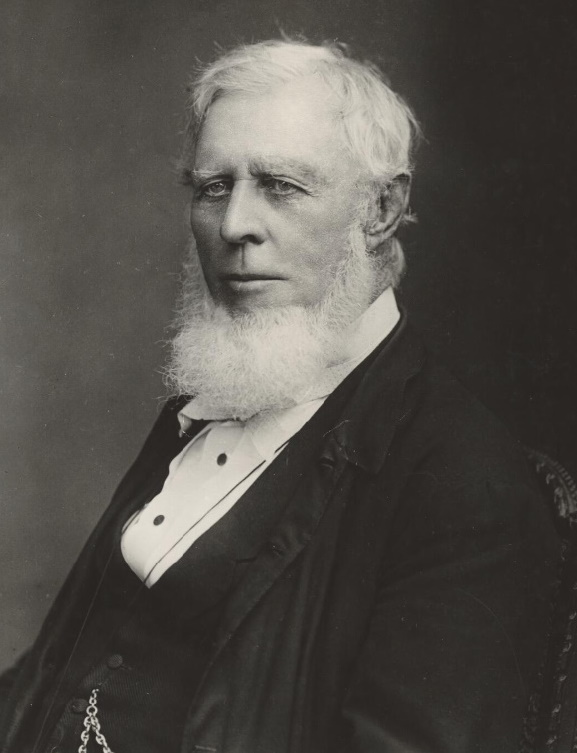

Secretary for Public Works
- In office 22 January 1866 – 26 October 1868
- Preceded by: Thomas Smart
- Succeeded by: John Sutherland
- In office 16 December 1870 – 13 May 1872
- Preceded by: John Sutherland
- Succeeded by: John Sutherland

Personal details
- Born: 15 January 1806 Edgeworthstown, Ireland
- Died: 17 September 1886 (aged 80) Parramatta, New South Wales

James Byrnes (15 January 1806 – 17 September 1886) was an Australian politician. He was an elected member of the New South Wales Legislative Council in 1851 and a member of the New South Wales Legislative Assembly for two periods totalling ten years between 1857 and 1872. He held the position of Secretary for Public Works on two occasions between 1866 and 1872.

== Biography ==
=== Early life ===
James Byrnes was born on 15 January 1806 in Edgeworthstown, county Longford, Ireland. His parents were James Byrnes and Frances (née Moorhouse), from a Protestant Anglo-Irish family. He migrated to Sydney with his family when Byrnes was about two years-old. His father served with the New South Wales Corps (often referred to as the Rum Corps) and with other regiments garrisoned in New South Wales. Byrnes had little formal education served an apprenticeship to a joiner and builder, and pursued that occupation for a number of years. Together with his younger brother William he invested in steam-powered cotton, wool and flour mills and pioneered steam ferry transport on the Parramatta River. He later invested in a number of colonial banks and insurance companies. Byrnes was a leading Methodist layman and was involved with a number of charities in Parramatta including the District Hospital and the Benevolent Society.

=== Colonial Parliament ===
Prior to the establishment of responsible self-government, Byrnes was elected to the semi-elected New South Wales Legislative Council in March 1850. He represented the electorate of County Cumberland but resigned after 15 months. Following the granting of self-government, Byrnes was elected to the first Legislative Assembly as one of the three members for the seat of Cumberland (South Riding). Although failing to be elected at the general election of 1856, he was subsequently successful at an 1857 by-election caused by the retirement of William Manning due to ill-health. At the 1858 colonial election he was elected to the two-member seat of Parramatta. He was subsequently the first member elected to the seat at the 1859 election but at the 1860 election he gained second place behind a newcomer John Lackey. While still successful, Byrnes took offence at being placed second and used his declaration of poll speech to upbraid the voters. He resigned from the seat before parliament met. Following his resignation, in 1861 he was one of 21 men that Premier Charles Cowper appointed in an attempt to stack the Legislative Council, however there was a mass walk-out from sitting members which meant that the council was unable to sit before it was prorogued and Byrnes and the others were unable to take their seat. In February 1862 he was elected the Mayor of Parramatta, a position he held until February 1866.

At the 1864 election Byrnes was again the first member elected for Parramatta and he retained the seat until he was defeated at the 1872 election. Byrnes initially supported the Cowper administration. When they were defeated in 1865, Byrnes accepted the office of the Minister for Public Works in the Martin administration. In August 1867 it was commented in the colonial press that he had discharged the duties of that office “if not with any marked brilliancy, at least, with industry and considerable ability”. Byrnes served as Secretary for Public Works in the second and third ministries of James Martin.

Subsequent attempts to re-gain public office were unsuccessful.

=== Family ===
Byrnes married Ruth Barber in 1826 and together they had five sons and a daughter. He remarried in 1852 to Ann Harris and they had a daughter. His youngest son, Charles, took over the woollen mill and was also a member of the Legislative Assembly as the member for Parramatta at various times between 1874 and 1882. His brother William was a member of the Legislative Council between 1858 and 1891.

=== Career after politics ===
In 1875 Byrnes was appointed to the office of Government Valuator of resumed lands required for railway purposes. He remained in that position until his death in 1886.

James Byrnes died at his residence in Macquarie-street, Parramatta, on 17 September 1886. Prior to his demise he had been confined to his bed for about nine weeks, suffering from heart disease “and other disorders”.

New South Wales Legislative Council
Preceded by Charles Cowper	Member for County of Cumberland; Mar 1850 – Jun 1851; With: Robert Fitzgerald	Succeeded by John Darvall
New South Wales Legislative Assembly
Preceded by William Manning	Member for Cumberland (South Riding); Jun 1857 – Dec 1857; With: Stuart Donaldson	Succeeded by Edward Flood
Preceded by Henry Parker	Member for Parramatta; Jan 1858 – Mar 1861; With: George Oakes/John Lackey	Succeeded by Arthur Holroyd
Preceded by Arthur Holroyd	Member for Parramatta; Nov 1864 – Feb 1872; With: James Farnell	Succeeded by Hugh Taylor
Political offices
Preceded by Thomas Smart	Secretary for Public Works; Jan 1866 – Oct 1868	Succeeded by John Sutherland
Preceded by John Sutherland	Secretary for Public Works; Dec 1870 – May 1872	Succeeded by John Sutherland
Civic offices
Preceded by John Williams	Mayor of Parramatta; 1862 – 1866	Succeeded by James Pye
