= Charles Byrnes =

Australian politician (1835–1917)

Charles Joseph Byrnes (1835 – 22 October 1917) was an Australian politician.

He was born in Parramatta, the youngest son of Ruth Barber and James Byrnes, a storekeeper and early New South Wales politician. His uncle William was also a member of the Legislative Council.

The younger Byrnes was articled to a solicitor, but chose business over law and took over the family wool mill at Parramatta. He also owned a tweed mill at Granville, and was a long-serving alderman and mayor of Parramatta. In 1874 he was elected to the New South Wales Legislative Assembly for Parramatta. He retired in 1877, was re-elected in 1880, and retired again in 1882. Byrnes died at Parramatta in 1917.

New South Wales Legislative Assembly
Preceded by James Farnell	Member for Parramatta; 1874–1877; Served alongside: Hugh Taylor	Succeeded by William Long
Preceded by William Long; Hugh Taylor	Member for Parramatta; 1880–1882	Succeeded by Hugh Taylor
