= Kevin Morgan (politician) =

Australian politician

Kevin Barry Morgan

Member of the New South Wales Legislative Assembly
- In office 1953–1956
- Preceded by: George Gollan
- Succeeded by: Jim Clough
- Constituency: Parramatta

Personal details
- Born: May 22, 1921 (age 105) Wollongong, New South Wales, Australia
- Died: September 6, 2003 (aged 82) Reynella, South Australia, Australia
- Party: Australian Labor Party
- Education: University of Sydney
- Profession: Solicitor

Kevin Barry Morgan (22 May 1921 – 6 September 2003) was an Australian politician and a member of the New South Wales Legislative Assembly for a single term between 1953 and 1956. He was a member of the Labor Party (ALP).

Morgan was born in Wollongong, New South Wales and was the son of federal MP Charles Morgan. He was educated at Saint Ignatius' College, Riverview and the Law School of the University of Sydney, from where he graduated in 1949. He worked as a solicitor in a practice established by his father. During World War Two he served with the Second Australian Imperial Force in New Guinea between 1941 and 1944 and reached the rank of sergeant. Morgan was elected to parliament as the Labor member for Parramatta at the 1953 state election. The incumbent Liberal member George Gollan had retired. The 1953 election saw Labor make significant gains in marginal seats, particularly in the Western Suburbs of Sydney. At the next election, in 1956, Labor's vote dropped because of divisions within the federal Labor Party and the formation of the DLP. As a result, Morgan lost the seat to the Liberal party's Jim Clough and retired from public life. He did not hold party, parliamentary or ministerial office. After leaving parliament, Morgan continued in his law practice. He wrote a family history called Ancestors and anecdotes and produced a play on the dismissal of Jack Lang called Friday, 13th May 1932.

New South Wales Legislative Assembly
Preceded by George Gollan	Member for Parramatta; 1953 – 1956	Succeeded by Jim Clough
