= Hugh Taylor (Australian politician) =

Australian politician

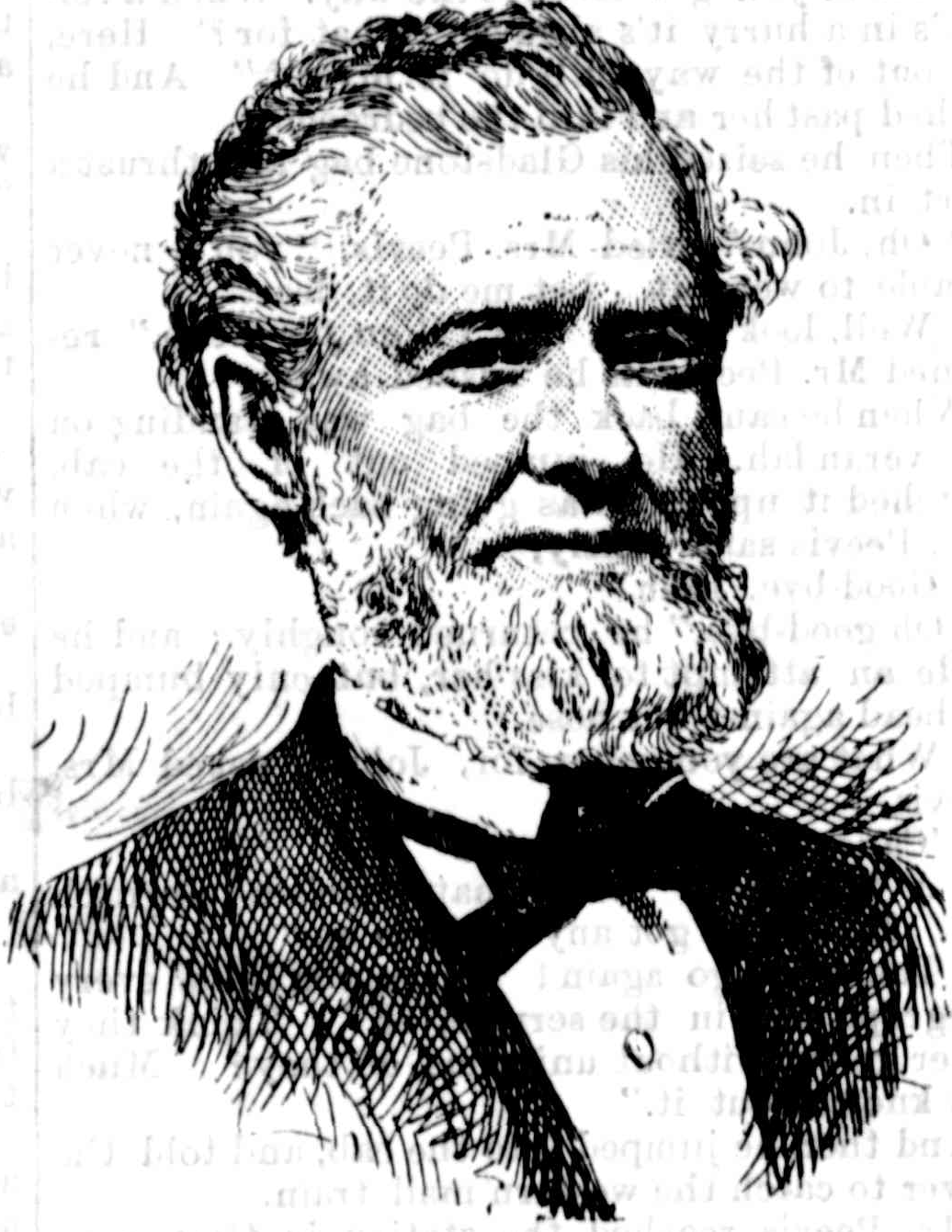

Hugh Taylor (19 March 1823 – 13 December 1897) was an Australian politician.

He was born at Parramatta to ex-convict Hugh Taylor, then a general agent, and Elizabeth O'Farrel. He was educated at The King's School, Parramatta, and became a butcher, although he also worked as a journalist for the Sydney Morning Herald. On 29 December 1846, he married Frances Eliza Connor, with whom he had six children; he converted to Roman Catholicism on his marriage.

In 1865 he became a Parramatta alderman, a position he held until his death in 1897; he was mayor from 1871 to 1873.

Initially a supporter of James Byrnes, he opposed Byrnes for the New South Wales Legislative Assembly seat of Parramatta in 1869. Unsuccessful on that occasion, he won election in 1872. Taylor immediately resigned as he had received conflicting legal advice as to whether his contract to supply articles to a destitute institution disqualified him from office. He was elected unopposed at the May 1872 by-election. He was re-elected in 1874, but resigned in 1876 after he was referred to the Committee of Elections and Qualification as to whether he had a contract with the government. He was re-elected at the April 1876 by-election. He was re-elected in 1877, defeated in 1880 when the electorate was reduced to a single member, but he was re-elected in 1882, becoming associated with the Free Trade Party. He held the seat until he was defeated again in 1894. He did not hold ministerial or parliamentary office.

Taylor died at Parramatta on 13 December 1897 (aged 74).

New South Wales Legislative Assembly
| Preceded by James Byrnes | Member for Parramatta; 1872–1880; With: Farnell/C. Byrnes/Long | Succeeded by Charles Byrnes |
| Preceded by Charles Byrnes | Member for Parramatta; 1882–1894 | Succeeded by Dowell O'Reilly |
Civic offices
| Preceded by Charles Byrnes | Mayor of Parramatta; 1871–1874 | Succeeded by Samuel Burge |
