= Bill Ely =

Australian politician

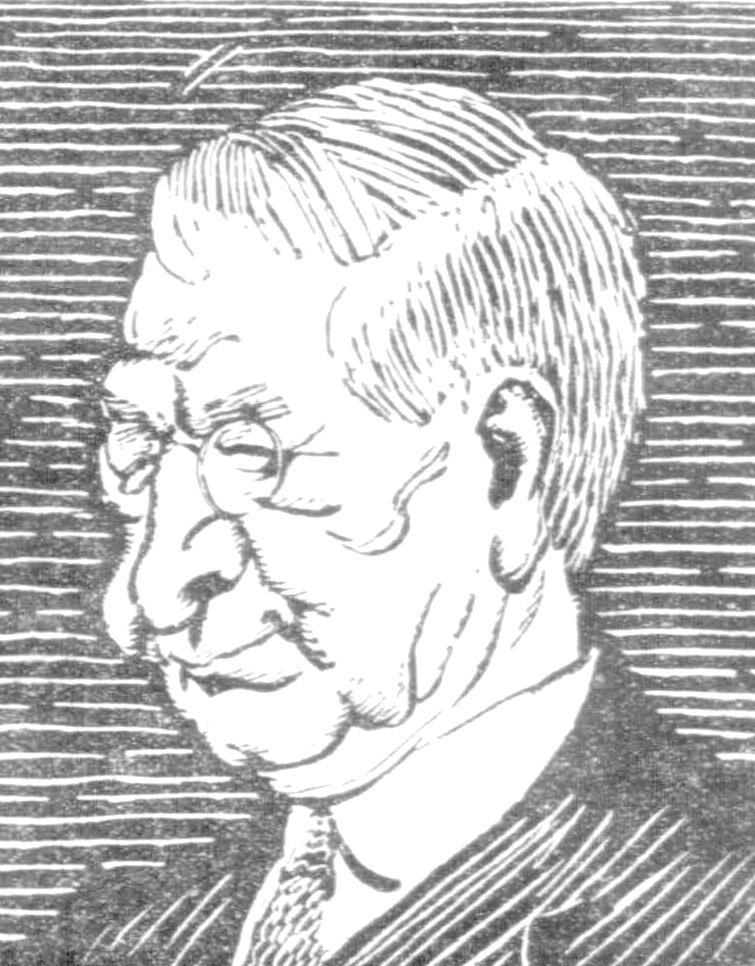
Caricature of William T. Ely, Minister for Health, by Syd Miller (published in Smith's Weekly, 2 April 1932).

William Thomas Ely (7 June 1869 – 19 April 1957) was an Australian politician. He was a Labor Party member of the New South Wales Legislative Assembly from 1920 to 1922 and 1925 to 1932, representing the electorates of Parramatta (1920–22, 1925–27) and Granville (1927–1932). He was Minister for Health during the second Lang government from 1931 until 1932.

Ely was born at Andersons Creek in Victoria and trained as a journalist. He worked for The Age in Melbourne, for which he was assigned to cover the Sydney, Melbourne and Adelaide conventions in the leadup to Federation, and later, some of the first meetings of the federal parliament. Ely was appointed as a representative of the newspaper in Sydney in 1905, and subsequently settled there. In 1912, he became co-proprietor of the Cumberland Times newspaper in Parramatta, a role he held until his election to parliament.

Ely entered state politics at the 1920 election, when he won the last seat in multi-member Parramatta with the preferences of Jack Lang. He lost the seat to Nationalist Thomas Morrow in 1922, but won it back in 1925. The multi-member system was abolished in 1927, and Ely contested and won the recreated seat of Granville. He was re-elected in 1930 as Labor won government, and Ely was appointed to the new ministry, initially as Assistant Minister for Labour and Industry, but being promoted to Minister for Health in 1931, following Lang's sacking of James McGirr. His career came to an end at the 1932 election, amidst Labor's heavy defeat after Lang was sacked as Premier by Governor Philip Game; one of many Labor MPs to lose their seats, Ely was defeated by United Australia Party candidate Claude Fleck. He again contested Granville in a much closer race in 1935, but lost to Fleck by 82 votes.

Ely retired from politics after his 1935 loss, and subsequently became a poultry farmer. He died at Bondi in 1957.

New South Wales Legislative Assembly
Preceded by Albert Bruntnell	Member for Parramatta (multi-member); 1920–1922; Served alongside: Bruntnell, Lang	Succeeded by Thomas Morrow
Preceded by Thomas Morrow	Member for Parramatta (multi-member); 1925–1927; Served alongside: Bruntnell, Lang	Succeeded by Albert Bruntnell
Preceded by Seat recreated	Member for Granville (single-member); 1927–1932	Succeeded by Claude Fleck
