= William Long (New South Wales politician) =

Australian politician

William Alexander Long

New South Wales Legislative Council – Member for Central Cumberland
- In office 30 June 1875 – 12 October 1877

New South Wales Legislative Assembly – Member for Parramatta
- In office 27 October 1877 – 9 November 1880

Treasurer of New South Wales
- In office 17 August 1877 – 17 December 1877

Personal details
- Born: 28 July, 1839 Sydney, Australia
- Died: 30 Novemvber 1915 (aged 76) Lewisham, Sydney
- Occupation: Politician, race horse owner

William Alexander Long (28 July 1839 – 30 November 1915) was an Australian politician and race-horse owner and pwho served in both the New South Wales Legislative Council and New South Wales Legislative Assembly in what was the then British Colony of New South Wales, an dalso Colonial Treasurer in 1877.

== Biography ==
=== Early life ===
Long was born in Sydney, Australia, the son of William Long (1797–1876) and his second wife. Long was educated privately and studied law in England, he was called to the Bar of the Inner Temple on 11 June 1862 and admitted to the New South Wales Bar on 22 December 1862.

=== Political career ===
Long represented Central Cumberland from 30 June 1875 to 12 October 1877, and Parramatta from 27 October 1877 to 9 November 1880, in the New South Wales Legislative Assembly. He was nominated to the New South Wales Legislative Council on 8 September 1885, a position he held until 17 March 1900.

He was Colonial Treasurer in the Robertson Government from 17 August to 17 December 1877.

=== Racing ===
Long was also a race-horse owner and one of his horses, Grand Flaneur, won nine successive races, including the Australian Jockey Club Derby, the Victoria Derby and the Melbourne Cup.

Long died unmarried on 30 November 1915 at Lewisham Hospital, Sydney.

Parliament of New South Wales
Political offices
| Preceded by William Piddington | Colonial Treasurer; August – December 1877 | Succeeded by Henry Cohen |
New South Wales Legislative Assembly
| Preceded by Joseph Wearne | Member for Central Cumberland; 1875 – 1877; Served alongside: John Lackey | Succeeded by Andrew McCulloch |
| Preceded by Charles Byrnes | Member for Parramatta; 1877 – 1880; Served alongside: Hugh Taylor | Succeeded by Charles Byrnes |
