= Joseph Byrne (Australian politician) =

Australian politician (1893–1973)

Joseph Patrick Byrne (11 June 1893 – 25 April 1973) was an Australian politician. He was a Labor Party member of the New South Wales Legislative Assembly from 1930 to 1932, representing the electorate of Parramatta.

Byrne was born at Auburn and educated at St. Benedict's School. He worked variously as a paper seller, dock hand, and blacksmith striker in his early life. He worked at McDonald's, a well-known softgoods store in York Street, from 1910 until the late 1920s, before opening his own store in Auburn; the store was rented and later sold after his election to parliament. He was an active member of the local Labor Party, serving as secretary of the Auburn branch. He was also an alderman of the Auburn Council at the time of his election to parliament.

Byrne was preselected as the Labor candidate for the electorate of Parramatta at the 1930 state election. Parramatta had been made newly marginal by a redistribution, and amidst Labor's strong victory under Jack Lang, he won the seat from incumbent UAP MLA Herbert Lloyd. In 1932, however, Lang was sacked by the state Governor, and Byrne was one of the many casualties of Labor's heavy loss at the subsequent election. He again contested the seat in 1935, but was soundly defeated. His last run for public office was at the 1940 federal election, when he unsuccessfully contested preselection for the Senate.

Byrne worked as a commercial traveller for the Egg Board after his parliamentary defeat, working until his retirement in 1963. He died at Parramatta in 1973, and was buried at North Rocks Cemetery.

New South Wales Legislative Assembly
Preceded by Herbert Lloyd	Member for Parramatta; 1930–1932	Succeeded by George Gollan
