= Tanya Gadiel =

Australian politician

The Honourable Tanya Gadiel

3rd Deputy Speaker of the Legislative Assembly
- In office 23 September 2008 – 4 March 2011
- Speaker: Richard Torbay
- Preceded by: Tony Stewart
- Succeeded by: Thomas George

Member of the New South Wales Legislative Assembly for Parramatta
- In office 22 March 2003 – 26 March 2011
- Preceded by: Gabrielle Harrison
- Succeeded by: Geoff Lee

Parliamentary Secretary Assisting the Premier on Community and Veterans Affairs, and Assisting the Minister for Police
- In office 8 May 2007 – 5 September 2008

Personal details
- Born: Tanya Rachelle Barber; 21 November 1972 (age 53) Cessnock, New South Wales, Australia
- Party: Labor Party
- Children: Liviya and Tahlia
- Occupation: Union organiser

Tanya Rachelle Gadiel, née Barber (born 21 November 1972), a former Australian politician, was a member of the New South Wales Legislative Assembly between 2003 and 2011, representing the electorate of Parramatta for the Labor Party. During her term in Parliament, Gadiel was Deputy Speaker of the New South Wales Legislative Assembly in the Kristina Keneally Labor Government. On 8 December 2010, Gadiel announced that she would not contest the 2011 state election.

== Early years and background ==
Gadiel was born in Cessnock, New South Wales and attended public schools, including Cessnock High School.

She studied arts and law at university before becoming involved in the trade union movement, serving as an organiser with the Communications, Electrical and Plumbing Union of Australia and as an industrial officer with the Australian Workers' Union. She was subsequently employed as a senior policy adviser to then-Police Minister Michael Costa. She was married, but has been divorced for a number of years.

== State politics ==
In late 2002, Gabrielle Harrison, the Member for Parramatta, announced she would retire from parliament at the upcoming 2003 state election. Harrison conceded that she had lost support among her branch members. It was reported that,

Right-wing party bosses want to replace former sports minister Gabrielle Harrison in Parramatta with Tanya Gadiel, a member of the staff of Police Minister Michael Costa...... Mrs Gadiel [does not] have the support to win local rank-and-file preselection ballots.

Gadiel was preselected to take her place after a bitter internal contest against Parramatta Lord Mayor David Borger. In 2007, Borger went on to be elected as the Member for Granville. With Borger not contesting the election, Gadiel had a relatively clear run, as the protest vote split between an independent and the Green candidate. While many commentators predicted a larger swing considering the amount of adverse press coverage, it nevertheless caused a small swing to the Liberal Party in what was otherwise a landslide victory for Labor.

Gadiel was re-elected at the 2007 state election and, in December 2010, announced her decision to not seek re-election at the 2011 state election, citing family reasons. Gadiel was the 19th NSW Labor member to stand aside at the March 2011 state election.

== Post-political career ==
Since leaving politics, Gadiel has been the CEO of Community Services at Parramatta Mission.

New South Wales Legislative Assembly
Preceded by Gabrielle Harrison	Member for Parramatta; 2003–2011	Succeeded by Geoff Lee
Preceded by Tony Stewart	Deputy Speaker of the Legislative Assembly; 2008–2011	Succeeded by Thomas George
