= Herbert Lloyd =

Australian general

Herbert William Lloyd
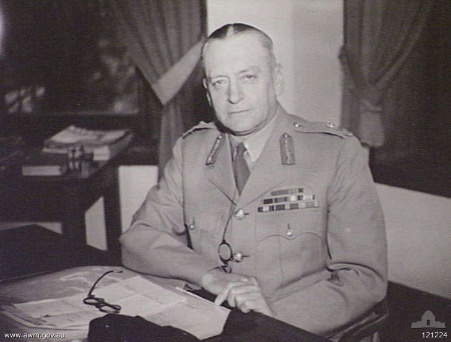
- Major General Herbert Lloyd as commander of the Second Army in 1945
- Born: 18 November 1883; South Yarra, Victoria
- Died: 10 August 1957 (aged 73); Concord, New South Wales
- Military career
- Allegiance: Australia
- Branch: Australian Army
- Service years: 1906–1946
- Rank: Major General
- Nickname: Bertie
- Commands: Second Army (1945); 1st Division (1943–45); 2nd Division (1940–43); 1st Divisional Artillery (1918–19); 5th Divisional Artillery (1918); 12th Field Artillery Brigade (1918); 6th Field Artillery Brigade (1917–18); 5th Field Artillery Brigade (1916–17); 22nd Field Artillery (Howitzer) Brigade (1916)
- Conflicts: First World War; Gallipoli Campaign; Western Front; Second World War
- Awards: Companion of the Order of the Bath; Companion of the Order of St Michael and St George; Commander of the Royal Victorian Order; Distinguished Service Order; Efficiency Decoration; Mentioned in Despatches (4); Officer of the Order of the White Eagle (Serbia)
- Other work: Member of New South Wales Legislative Assembly

Major General Herbert William Lloyd, CB, CMG, CVO, DSO, ED (18 November 1883 – 10 August 1957) was an Australian Army officer who served in the First and Second World Wars. He was a member of the proto-fascist New Guard.

== Early life and career ==
Herbert William Lloyd was born in South Yarra, Melbourne, the son of a police officer. He was educated at University High School and Wesley College. On 26 June 1902 he joined the public service in the treasury department.

Lloyd was commissioned in the Australian Field artillery as a second lieutenant on 9 July 1906. He was promoted to lieutenant on 2 July 1907 and then to captain on 16 August 1909. On 31 March 1910, Lloyd quit the treasury department and joined the Permanent Forces as a full lieutenant. He was promoted to captain again on 1 May 1914.

== First World War ==
Lloyd was appointed to the Australian Imperial Force on 18 August 1914 with the rank of captain as adjutant of the 1st Field Artillery Brigade, which sailed for Egypt in October 1914. He landed on Cape Helles with the 1st Brigade on 4 May 1915. On 9 May 1915, the commander of the 1st Field Artillery Battery, Major Sweetland, was evacuated sick and Lloyd took over as battery commander. The battery fired in support of the British until shifted to Anzac Cove in September, Lloyd remaining in command until Gallipoli was evacuated in December. For his services at Gallipoli, Lloyd was awarded the Distinguished Service Order (DSO).

Lloyd held the position of Brigade Major of the 2nd Divisional Artillery from 1 January to 11 March 1916. In preparation for the move to the Western Front, the number of batteries per division was increased from nine to sixteen. As a consequence, most of the original battery commanders were given brigades to form. Lloyd was promoted to lieutenant colonel on 12 March 1916 and given the new 22nd Field Artillery (Howitzer) Brigade. On 13 April 1916 he took over the 5th Field Artillery Brigade and in February to March 1917 was acting commander of the 2nd Divisional Artillery. He commanded the artillery in support of an advance column under the command of Brigadier General Harold Elliott. In May he became acting commander of the 2nd Divisional Artillery again. For his services in these battles, Lloyd was made a Companion of the Order of St Michael and St George (CMG), and awarded the Serbian Order of the White Eagle.

Lloyd took over command of the 6th Field Artillery Brigade on 28 November 1917 and then the 12th Field Artillery Brigade on 7 February 1918. Lloyd was credited with turning the 12th Artillery Brigade into an outstanding unit.

On 11 April 1918, Lloyd and his 12th Brigade was sent forward to assist the Scottish infantry attempting to stop the German advance in the Lys sector. On 8 November 1918, Lloyd took over command of the 5th Divisional Artillery from Brigadier General Alfred Bessell-Browne and was promoted to temporary brigadier general. On 5 December Lloyd took over command of the 1st Divisional Artillery, holding the position until 24 March 1919. He was made a Companion of the Order of the Bath (CB) in the 1919 King's Birthday Honours for his services on the Western Front, during which time he had been Mentioned in Despatches four times.

== Between the wars ==
Lloyd's appointment to the AIF was terminated on 15 July 1919 and he was posted to Army Headquarters in Melbourne where he was Chief Inspector of Field Artillery from 16 July to 1 November 1919, Director of Artillery from 2 November 1919 to 31 March 1920, and general staff officer Artillery from 1 April to 3 September 1920. While in the AIF he had been given the rank of brevet major on 1 December 1915. He was promoted to the substantive rank of major on 1 November 1919 and brevet rank of lieutenant colonel on the same day. He was promoted to the permanent rank of lieutenant colonel on 1 January 1920. He held the honorary rank of brigadier general from 8 November 1918. Lloyd acted as transport officer for the 1920 visit to Australia of the then Prince of Wales, for which he was appointed a Commander of the Royal Victorian Order (CVO).

From September 1920 to January 1922, Lloyd attended the Staff College at Quetta, in India. On his return to Australia Lloyd was posted to 1st Division Headquarters in Sydney from 1 February 1922 to 26 August 1925. Lloyd resigned from the permanent forces on 26 August 1925 and transferred to the Militia's unattached list.

In 1925 Lloyd took up a job with Vacuum Oil. He was elected as the Nationalist candidate for the Legislative Assembly seat of Parramatta at the 1929 by-election following the death of the Nationalist member, Albert Bruntnell. He was defeated in the 1930 election, but in 1932 won the seat of Mosman as a United Australia Party candidate, holding the seat at the 1935, and 1938 elections. He was defeated by Donald Macdonald an Independent UAP candidate at the 1941 election.

== Second World War ==
From May to July 1940, Lloyd held the post of Director General of Army Recruiting. He was recalled to active duty on 1 August 1940 with the rank of brigadier as Deputy Adjutant General at Army Headquarters. He was promoted to temporary major general on 23 October 1940 when he took over command of the 2nd Division, a Militia formation. From 25 April to 31 July 1941, he was also Director-General of Army Recruiting.

In 1942, the 2nd Division was assigned to III Corps—commanded by Lieutenant General Gordon Bennett—which was tasked with defending Western Australia. Lloyd joined the Second Australian Imperial Force on 15 January 1943 with the substantive rank of colonel, but as a temporary major general. However, in September 1943, he returned to Sydney to command the 1st Division, another Militia unit. On 8 May 1945, Lloyd took command of the Second Army. General Sir Thomas Blamey recommended him for an active command, but the War Cabinet ruled that as Lloyd was now 61, the post-war army would be better served by the appointment of a younger officer.

Lloyd retired on 1 February 1946 as a major general. He became a company director, with his appointments including the Adelaide Steamship Company. He died on 10 August 1957 and was cremated.

== See also ==
- List of Australian generals

Military offices
Preceded by Lieutenant General Sir Leslie Morshead	GOC Second Army; 1945	Formation inactivated
Preceded by Major General James Cannan	GOC 2nd Division; 1940–1943	Succeeded by Major General Horace Robertson
New South Wales Legislative Assembly
Preceded by Albert Bruntnell	Member for Parramatta; 1929–1930	Succeeded by Joseph Byrne
Preceded by Richard Arthur	Member for Mosman; 1932–1941	Succeeded by Donald Macdonald
