= George Gollan =

Australian politician

The Honourable George Gollan

Minister for Labour and Industry and Social Welfare
- In office 16 August 1939 – 16 May 1941
- Preceded by: Athol Richardson
- Succeeded by: Hamilton Knight

Personal details
- Born: 17 April 1886 Woodburn, New South Wales
- Died: 4 January 1957 (aged 70) Camperdown, New South Wales
- Party: United Australia Party, Democratic Party Liberal Party

George Charles Gollan (17 April 1886 – 4 January 1957) was an Australian politician and a member of the New South Wales Legislative Assembly from 1932 until 1953 . He was variously a member of the United Australia Party (UAP), Democratic Party and Liberal Party. He held numerous ministerial positions between 1937 and 1941 and was the United Australia Party whip between 1935 and 1937.

== Early life ==
Gollan was born in Woodburn, New South Wales and was the son of a farmer. He was educated at state schools and initially worked as a teacher in rural New South Wales. He resigned from the Education Department in 1912 and later owned various businesses in Sydney including news agencies, butcher shops and leather goods shops. Gollan was an alderman on Auburn Council between 1922 and 1932 and was the Mayor in 1926.

== State Parliament ==
He was elected to the New South Wales Parliament as the United Australia Party member for Parramatta at the 1932 state election. He defeated the sitting Labor member, Joseph Byrne and his victory helped the UAP's Bertram Stevens to form a government. He held the seat at the next 6 elections but a redistribution prior to the 1953 state election made the seat notionally Labor and he retired. At the 1944 election he was a member of the Democratic Party and he became a foundation member of the Liberal Party of Australia in 1946.

== Government ==
During the premierships of Bertram Stevens and Alexander Mair, Gollan held numerous ministerial positions including Minister for Labour and Industry and Social Welfare and Chief Secretary.

Civic offices
Preceded by George Ritchie	Mayor of Auburn; 1924–1926	Succeeded by Albert Thomas Briggs
New South Wales Legislative Assembly
Preceded by Joseph Byrne	Member for Parramatta; 1932 – 1953	Succeeded by Kevin Morgan
Political offices
Preceded by Frank Chaffey	Chief Secretary; 1938 – 1939	Succeeded by Alwyn Tonking
Preceded by Athol Richardson	Minister for Labour and Industry and Social Welfare; 1939 – 1941	Succeeded by Hamilton Knight
