= Donna Davis (politician) =

Australian politician

Donna Davis MP

Member of the New South Wales Legislative Assembly for Parramatta
- Incumbent
- Assumed office 25 March 2023
- Preceded by: Geoff Lee

28th Lord Mayor of Parramatta
- In office 10 January 2022 – 22 May 2023
- Deputy: Sameer Pandey
- Preceded by: Steven Issa
- Succeeded by: Sameer Pandey

Councillor of the City of Parramatta for Epping Ward
- In office 9 September 2017 – 25 January 2024
- Preceded by: Ward created
- Succeeded by: Vacant

Personal details
- Party: Labor
- Spouse: Michael
- Occupation: Politician

Donna Frances Reeman Davis is an Australian politician. She has been a Labor member of the New South Wales Legislative Assembly representing Parramatta since the 2023 New South Wales state election. She previously served as the Lord Mayor of Parramatta between 2022 and 2023, and as a councillor for Epping Ward from 2017 until 2024.

== Personal life ==
Davis has a degree in arts with honours and resides with her husband Michael in the Dundas Valley. She was Yates Avenue Public School P&C President, had been involved in establishing funding for regional indigenous communities in Tasmania and volunteered for the Cumberland Gang Show for seven years.

== Political career ==
Before her election Davis worked for a number of federal and state members of parliament and had held positions in the former Department of Employment, Education and Training.

In 2017 Davis was elected to the City of Parramatta council following its amalgamation, representing Epping Ward. She was elected by councillors as its lord mayor on 10 January 2022, the third woman to hold the title.

Davis is a member of the Australian Labor Party and was announced as the party's endorsed candidate for the New South Wales state seat of Parramatta for the 2023 New South Wales state election. She defeated the Liberal candidate, Katie Mullens, with a large swing.

Following her election to the parliament, Davis initially resisted pressure to resign from the lord mayoralty, surviving a notice of motion brought by councillor Lorraine Wearne requesting that she resign over her dual responsibilities. Davis could have legally held both offices until the local government elections in 2024. However, she resigned as lord mayor on 22 May 2023, and the then-Deputy Lord Mayor Sameer Pandey was elected by councillors to replace her. Davis resigned from Council in 2024.

Civic offices
Preceded by Steven Issa	Lord Mayor of Parramatta; 2022–2023	Succeeded by Sameer Pandey
