= Geoff Lee =

Australian politician

The Honourable Dr Geoff Lee
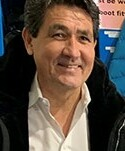

Minister for Corrections
- In office 21 December 2021 – 28 March 2023
- Premier: Dominic Perrottet
- Preceded by: Anthony Roberts (as Minister for Counter Terrorism and Corrections)
- Succeeded by: Anoulack Chanthivong

Minister for Skills and Tertiary Education
- In office 2 April 2019 – 21 December 2021
- Premier: Gladys Berejiklian; Dominic Perrottet
- Preceded by: John Barilaro (as Minister for Skills)
- Succeeded by: Alister Henskens (as Minister for Skills and Training)

Minister for Sport, Multiculturalism, Seniors and Veterans
- In office 3 March 2021 – 27 May 2021
- Premier: Gladys Berejiklian
- Preceded by: John Sidoti
- Succeeded by: Natalie Ward

Member of the New South Wales Legislative Assembly for Parramatta
- In office 26 March 2011 – 25 March 2023
- Preceded by: Tanya Gadiel
- Succeeded by: Donna Davis

Personal details
- Born: Geoffrey Lee; 1967 or 1968 (age 58–59)
- Party: Liberal
- Education: Macquarie Graduate School of Management; Macquarie University; University of Western Sydney – Hawkesbury
- Occupation: Politician, academic and former horticulturalist

Geoffrey Lee (born c. 1967) is a former Australian politician. He was the Minister for Corrections in the second Perrottet ministry between December 2021 and March 2023. He has previously served as the Minister for Skills and Tertiary Education in the second Berejiklian and Perrottet ministries between April 2019 and December 2021. Lee was also a member of the New South Wales Legislative Assembly representing Parramatta for the Liberal Party since 2011 until his retirement in 2023.

== Early years and background ==
Geoff Lee was born in 1967 and has an Anglo-Celtic Australian and Chinese Australian background. He attained a Bachelor of Applied Science degree in horticulture from the University of Western Sydney – Hawkesbury and was managing director of Hambledon Garden Centre, a garden centre and landscaping business in Parramatta from 1992 until 2001. He completed his Master of Business Administration from Macquarie University's School of Business Administration in 2001 and commenced teaching part-time at Liverpool TAFE. From 2004 to 2006, Lee was a lecturer in business at the University of Western Sydney (UWS) and, during this time, completed a Doctor of Business Administration degree at the Macquarie Graduate School of Management. In 2007, he was appointed Associate Dean (Engagement) at Western Sydney University.

== Political career ==
At the 2011 state election, Lee was elected as member for Parramatta, traditionally a strong Labor seat. Going into the election, Labor held Parramatta with a majority of 13.1 percent, which would have normally made it a safe Labor seat. However, as a measure of the size of the massive Coalition wave that swept New South Wales that year, Lee picked up a swing of 25.8 percent, large enough to turn Parramatta into a safe Liberal seat. He later said that could not have won—and certainly not with as large a swing—without winning over dozens of people who had never voted for a Liberal before. He was re-elected in 2015 and 2019, becoming the first non-Labor member since the 1950 state election to have held the seat for more than one term.

Prior to the 2019 New South Wales state election in May, Lee served as Parliamentary Secretary to the Premier, Western Sydney and Multiculturalism from 1 Feb 2017 to 23 Mar 2019. Following the 2019 state election, Lee was appointed as the Minister for Skills and Tertiary Education in the second Berejiklian ministry, with effect from 2 April 2019. Amid an Independent Commission Against Corruption investigation into former sports minister John Sidoti in September 2019, Lee was appointed Acting Minister for Sport, Multiculturalism, Seniors and Veterans until the preliminary investigation concluded. Sidoti later resigned from Cabinet in March 2021 and "Lee will continue to act in those portfolios until I determine a replacement in the near future," according the NSW Premier Gladys Berejiklian. Following the October 2021 election of Dominic Perrottet as Leader of the NSW Liberal Party and his appointment as Premier, Perrottet reshuffled the ministry with effect from December 2021, where Lee was appointed as Minister for Corrections.

In 2023, he was appointed professor at Western Sydney University's School of Business. Lee is non-executive director of the Community Migrant Resource Centre, chair of the Governing Council of the Sydney Polytechnic Institute, and non-executive director of AFEA.

New South Wales Legislative Assembly
| Preceded by Tanya Gadiel | Member for Parramatta; 2011–2023 | Succeeded by Donna Davis |
Political offices
| Preceded by John Barilaro as Minister for Skills | Minister for Skills and Tertiary Education; 2019–2021 | Succeeded by Alister Henskens as Minister for Skills and Training |
| Preceded by John Sidoti | Minister for Sport, Multiculturalism, Seniors and Veterans; 2021 | Succeeded by Natalie Ward |
| Preceded by Anthony Roberts as Minister for Counter Terrorism and Corrections | Minister for Corrections; 2021–2023 | Succeeded by Anoulack Chanthivong |
