= Jim Clough =

Australian politician

James Arthur Clough AM (13 July 1916 – 20 May 2003) was an Australian politician. He was the Liberal member for Parramatta in the New South Wales Legislative Assembly from 1956 to 1959, and for Eastwood from 1965 to 1988.

Clough was born in Warialda, the son of Ralph and Margaret Jane (née O'Farrell) Clough. He was educated at Warialda Convent, and later at St Patrick's Marist Brothers, Sydney. He became an accountant, although he also worked as a station hand and sheep shearer. In 1939 he enlisted in the AIF, serving until 1942 when he was medically discharged. He married railway employee Patricia McNamara on 16 February 1945, with whom he would have eight children.

He was commissioned as a justice of the peace in 1946, in which year he also became a member of the Liberal Party's State Council. He was the Liberal candidate for the safe Labor seat of Reid in the 1949 and 1951 federal elections.

In 1956, Clough was preselected as the Liberal candidate for the state seat of Parramatta, held by Labor MP Kevin Morgan. Clough defeated Morgan, but after a redistribution in 1959 the seat was given a Labor majority and Clough did not contest the election. He was instead elected to Baulkham Hills Council, but re-entered state politics in 1965 following the retirement of Eastwood Liberal MP Eric Hearnshaw, and was Minister for Youth, Ethnic and Community Affairs for four months in 1976. He held the seat until 1988, when he was defeated for preselection by Andrew Tink and retired.

Clough was made a Member of the Order of Australia (AM) at the 1989 Australia Day Honours for "service to the NSW Parliament and to the community".

New South Wales Legislative Assembly
Preceded by Kevin Morgan	Member for Parramatta; 1956–1959	Succeeded by Dan Mahoney
Preceded by Eric Hearnshaw	Member for Eastwood; 1965–1988	Succeeded by Andrew Tink
