= Gabrielle Harrison =

Australian politician

The Honorable Gabrielle Harrison BA

Member of the New South Wales Legislative Assembly for Parramatta
- In office 27 August 1994 – 20 March 2003
- Preceded by: Andrew Ziolkowski
- Succeeded by: Tanya Gadiel

Minister for Sport and Recreation
- In office 4 April 1995 – 8 April 1999

Personal details
- Born: Gabrielle Mary Harrison; 25 March 1964 (age 62) New South Wales
- Party: Labor Party
- Spouse(s): Andrew Ziolkowski (deceased), Ron Bonham
- Children: 1 son
- Education: Macquarie University

Gabrielle Mary Harrison (born 25 March 1964) is an Australian former politician. She served as a Labor Party Member of the New South Wales Legislative Assembly from 1994 until 2003, representing the electorate of Parramatta. Harrison succeeded her first husband, Andrew Ziolkowski, who died in office.

== Private life ==
Harrison is the daughter of Edwin Harrison and Faye Ware. Harrison's brother, Steve, was a union official and joint secretary of the Australian Workers' Union. Harrison has a sister, Jennifer. The death of her first husband came at a very difficult time for her and her brother, who also suffered the loss of their grandparents in the same week.

== Early years ==
Harrison studied law at Macquarie University, in Sydney. At university she became heavily involved in student politics, and was chairman of the university Students' Union. It was at university that she met her future husband Ziolkowski, who was on the Students' Council and editor of the university newspaper, Arena. She joined the Labor Party in 1984, and was active in Young Labor. After university, she became secretary of the Parramatta branch of the ALP. She married Ziolkowski on 30 November 1985.

== New South Wales state politics ==
In July 1993, Ziolkowski advised Leader of the Opposition, Bob Carr, that he had been diagnosed with a very rare form of cancer of the oesophagus.

When her husband died in 1994, Harrison was endorsed by the Labor Party as candidate for a by-election for the seat of Parramatta. She was criticised by her opponent, Liberal candidate, Wendy Jones, for running for office instead of staying at home and looking after her son Tristan, then aged 7. Harrison won the 1994 Parramatta by-election without being forced to preferences, earning a swing of nine percent towards her party. Harrison was re-elected at the 1995, and 1999 elections. With strong interests in netball, running and fishing, Harrison was appointed Minister for Sport and Recreation in 1995. She lost her portfolio following the 1999 State election.

During 2002, Harrison (along with NSW Speaker John Murray) was sued before the Australian Industrial Relations Commission for A$800,000 by former staffer Anne Stonham, who claimed that her contract was "unfair" and she had been overworked. The court subsequently found in favour of Harrison. Another staffer, John Cairn, accused Harrison of keeping photographs of her enemies in a locket around her neck.

In the lead-up to the 2003 State Election, it was reported that,

Right-wing party bosses want to replace former sports minister Gabrielle Harrison in Parramatta with Tanya Gadiel, a member of the staff of Police Minister Michael Costa. ..... Mrs Gadiel [does not] have the support to win local rank-and-file preselection ballots.

Harrison conceded that she had lost support among her branch members and subsequently announced on 20 December 2002 that she would not be seeking re-endorsement as the Labor candidate in the 2003 State election.

Gadiel was endorsed as Labor candidate for Parramatta in a bitter pre-selection.

== Post politics ==
Harrison lives with her second husband Ron Bonham, her son Tristan, and Bonham's daughter. In late 2002, she told media that she was looking forward to a quiet life.

New South Wales Legislative Assembly
Preceded by Andrew Ziolkowski	Member for Parramatta; 1994 – 2003	Succeeded by Tanya Gadiel
