= Andrew Ziolkowski =

Australian politician

Member of the New South Wales Legislative Assembly for Parramatta
- In office 25 May 1991 – 12 April 1994
- Preceded by: John Books
- Succeeded by: Gabrielle Harrison

Personal details
- Born: Andrew Charles Frederick Ziolkowski; 12 December 1963 Forbes, New South Wales, Australia
- Died: 12 April 1994 (aged 30) Westmead, New South Wales, Australia
- Party: Labor Party
- Spouse: Gabrielle Harrison
- Children: 1 son
- Education: Macquarie University
- Occupation: Industrial Research Officer

Andrew Charles Frederick Ziolkowski (12 December 1963 – 12 April 1994) was an Australian politician. He served as a Labor Party Member of the New South Wales Legislative Assembly from 1991 until his death in 1994, representing the electoral district of Parramatta. He was one of three New South Wales MPs to die that year, with John Newman (47) dying close before and Tony Doyle (41) following soon after. He was succeeded in office by his wife, Gabrielle Harrison.

== Private life ==
Ziolkowski was born in Forbes, New South Wales, the son of Wladyslaw Ziolkowski - a Polish immigrant - and his wife Roma Ziolkowski. He moved to Parramatta, in western Sydney, as a child. He grew up in Parramatta, and attended St Patrick's Primary School and Parramatta Marist High School.

== Early years ==
After finishing school he worked as a Process Worker for Alcan in Granville and as a Steelworks Tradesman's Assistant for BHP in Wollongong. Ziolkowski's political career began as a result of his involvement in trade unions and student politics. He attended university at Macquarie University, where he sat on the executive of the Students' Council and edited the student newspaper, Arena. It was during his student days that Ziolkowski met his future wife, Gabrielle Harrison, who was chairman of the Student Union at the time.

NSW Premier Bob Carr would later tell Parliament, "Andrew was editor of the Macquarie University student newspaper Arena, while Gabrielle continued as the president of the Students' Union. I understand that his wife got a lot of coverage in the student paper." Ziolkowski married Harrison on 30 November 1985 and she elected to retain her maiden name. After university, Ziolkowski, who had been involved in Young Labor at university, found work as an Industrial Research Officer for the then-Federal Member for Parramatta, The Hon. John Brown. In 1990 he was appointed a union official for the Transport Workers Union of Australia.

== State politics ==
Ziolkowski was elected Member for Parramatta in 1991. At the age of 27 he was the youngest person ever elected to the New South Wales Parliament, and his difficult-to-pronounce surname soon saw him dubbed "Zorro" by fellow MPs. In July 1993, Ziolkowski advised the Leader of the Opposition, Bob Carr, that he had been diagnosed with a rare form of cancer, affecting the esophagus and by September 1993 was forced by illness to stop attending parliament. He finally succumbed in early 1994 at the age of 30.

Ziolkowski's death resulted in a by-election on held on 27 August 1994, which his wife, Gabrielle Harrison, went on to win. He was survived by his wife and a son, Tristan, then aged 7. In her maiden speech to Parliament, Harrison stated

Andrew had hoped to publicly thank the staff of ward C5C at Westmead Hospital for their dedication and many acts of kindness. It is appropriate that I do that tonight on his behalf.

New South Wales Legislative Assembly
Preceded by John Books	Member for Parramatta; 1991 – 1994	Succeeded by Gabrielle Harrison
