= Barry Wilde =

Australian politician (1928–2018)

Barry Wilde OAM

Member of the NSW Legislative Assembly for Parramatta
- In office 1 May 1976 – 22 February 1988
- Preceded by: Dan Mahoney
- Succeeded by: John Books
- Constituency: Parramatta

Personal details
- Born: Barry Charles Wilde; 3 September 1928 Marrickville, Sydney
- Died: 18 January 2018 (aged 89) Sydney
- Party: Labor Party

Barry Charles Wilde OAM (3 September 1928 – 18 January 2018) was an Australian politician. He served as a Labor Party Member of the New South Wales Legislative Assembly from 1976 until 1988, representing the electorate of Parramatta.

Wilde previously served on Parramatta City Council from 1959 to 1977, as deputy mayor in 1966 and as mayor from 1967 to 1974. Having joined the Labor Party in 1949, he held various positions in the local branch. He ran for the seat of Parramatta in the 1966 and 1969 Federal elections against Sir Nigel Bowen, and the 1974 Federal election against Philip Ruddock; however, he was unsuccessful at each attempt.

Following the retirement of sitting State Member Dan Mahoney, Wilde was elected to the Labor seat of Parramatta at the 1976 state election. Wilde was re-elected at the 1978, 1981, and 1984 elections. This was despite an electoral redistribution in 1979, where the safe Labor seat became marginally Liberal. Wilde was subsequently defeated by Liberal candidate John Books in the 1988 election.

In 2016 he was awarded the Medal of the Order of Australia "for service to the Parliament of New South Wales, and to the community of Parramatta".

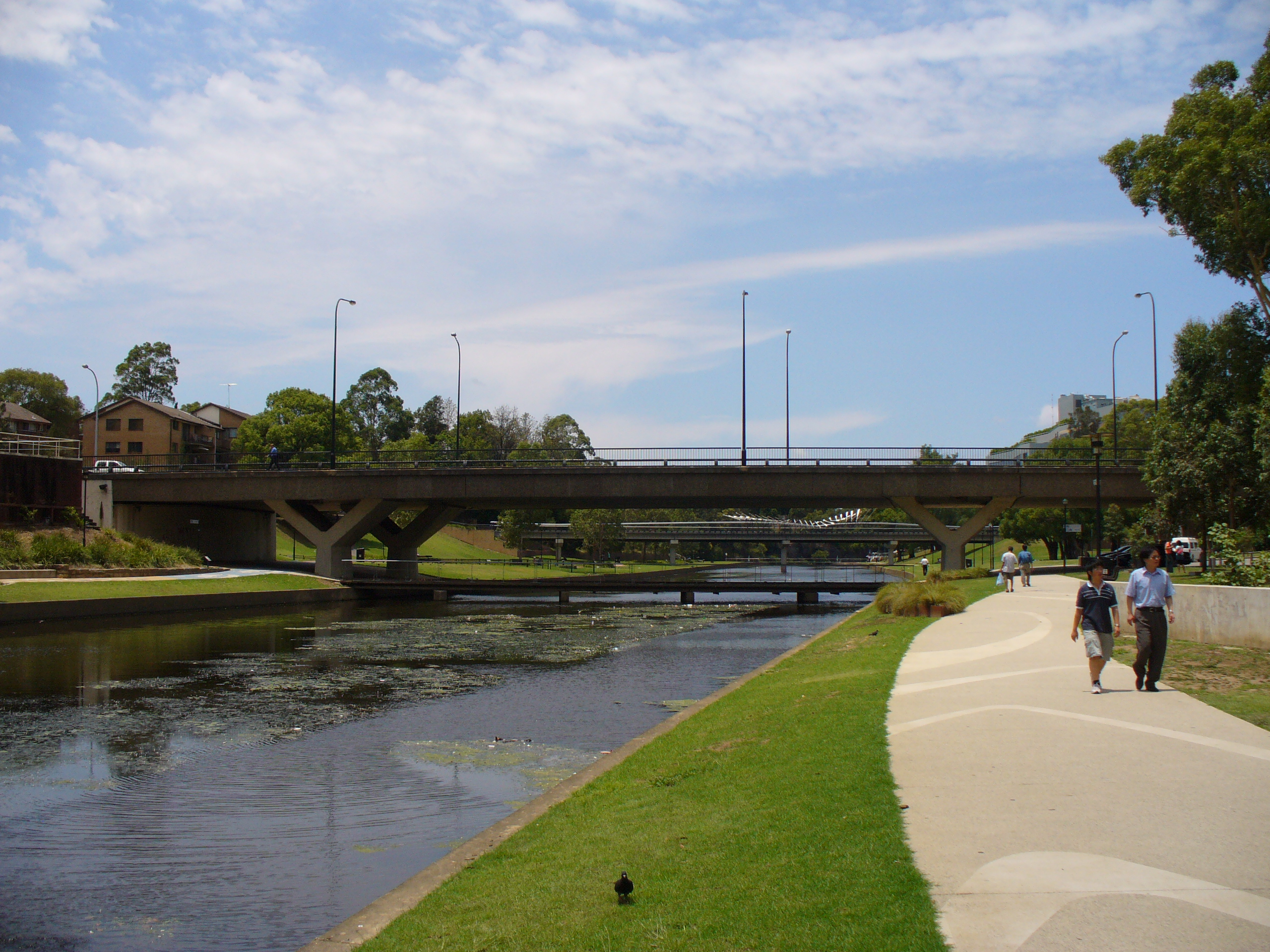
Barry Wilde Bridge, Parramatta

A bridge that crosses Parramatta River, running north from Smith Street to Wilde Avenue and constructed in 1975, is named in his honour.

New South Wales Legislative Assembly
Preceded by Dan Mahoney	Member for Parramatta; 1976–1988	Succeeded by John Books
