= Dowell O'Reilly =

Australian politician

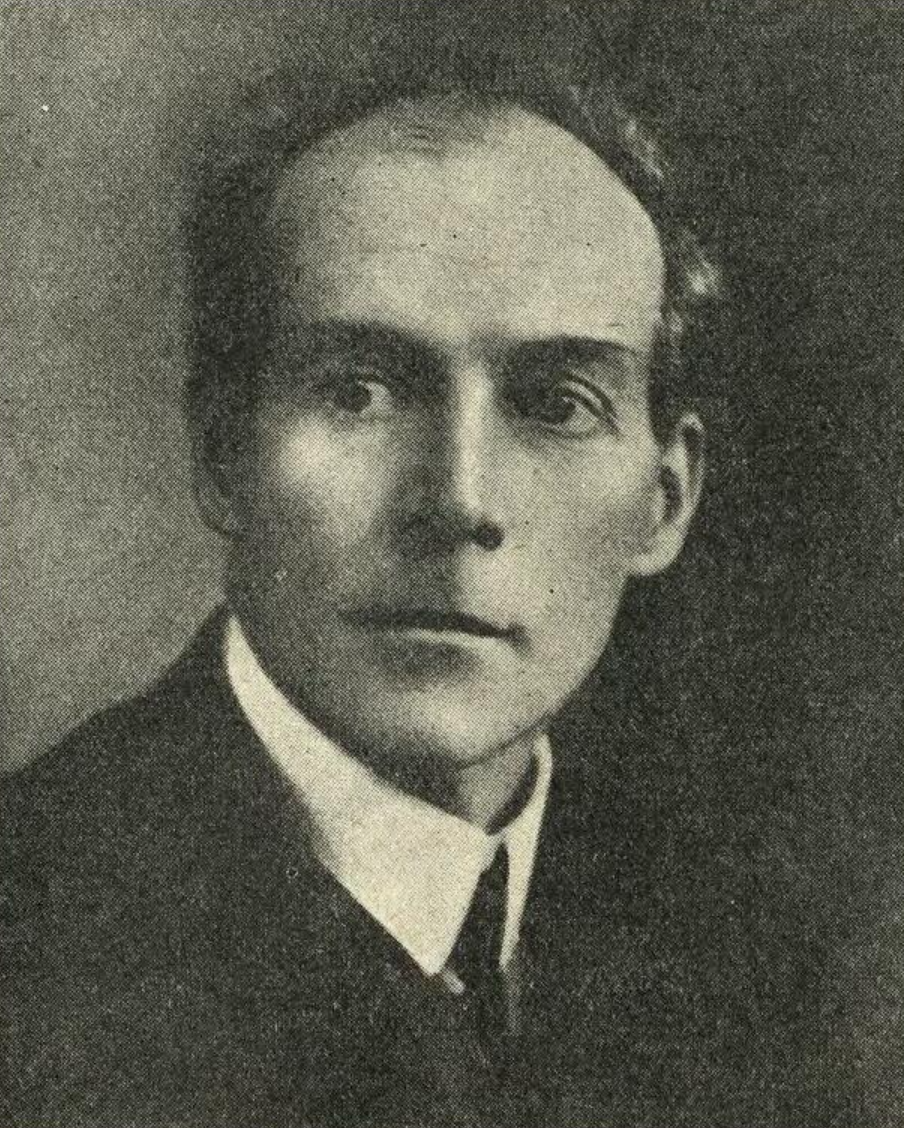
- Born: 18 July 1865 Sydney, New South Wales, Australia
- Died: 5 November 1923 (aged 58) Leura, New South Wales, Australia
- Occupation: Poet; short story writer; politician
- Period: 1884–1920

Dowell Philip O'Reilly (18 July 1865 – 5 November 1923) was an Australian poet, short story writer and politician.

== Early life ==
O'Reilly was born in Sydney to a clergyman father.

== Political career ==
In 1894 O'Reilly was elected to the Legislative Assembly for Parramatta and sat for four years. In 1910 he again stood for Parramatta, this time as a Labor candidate with the encouragement of Billy Hughes, but was defeated, and shortly afterwards obtained a position in the Sydney land tax branch of the Commonwealth Treasury. In 1913, Hughes asked O'Reilly about the views of his brother-in-law, Albert Piddington, on states' rights. O'Reilly cabled Piddington to clarify this, and as a result of Piddington's reply, "In sympathy with supremacy of Commonwealth powers", Hughes appointed him to the Australian High Court. As a result of opposition to his appointment and his belief that he was compromised by the exchange of cables he resigned without sitting in court.

== Bibliography ==
=== Poems ===
- Australian Poems under pseudonym 'D'. (1884)
- Pedlar's Pack. (1888)

=== Short stories ===
- Tears and Triumph (1913)
- Five Corners. (1920)

=== Letters ===
- Dowell O'Reilly From his Letters. (1927)

=== Individual poems ===
- "Sea-Grief" (1899)

New South Wales Legislative Assembly
Preceded by Hugh Taylor	Member for Parramatta; 1894–1898	Succeeded by William Ferris
