= John Books =

Australian politician (1941–2017)

John Cameron Books (21 June 1941 – 17 August 2017) was an Australian politician. He was the Liberal member for Parramatta in the New South Wales Legislative Assembly from 1988 to 1991.

Books was born in Sydney and attended Christian schools. He qualified as a metallurgist at Wollongong Technical College and at Launceston before training at Port Kembla. He became a production superintendent with Comalco aluminium and New South Wales manager of Steelstocks Industries Pty Ltd and Artcraft Engineering, as well as an associate of the Australian Institute of Management. A member of the Liberal Party, he was elected to various councils and served as Mayor of Parramatta 1983–84.

In 1988, Books defeated Labor MP Barry Wilde to win the state seat of Parramatta. He won by less than 300 votes, helped by Democrat preferences. After the 1991 redistribution, however, the seat became notionally Labor, and Books was defeated by Andrew Ziolkowski.

New South Wales Legislative Assembly
| Preceded by Barry Wilde | Member for Parramatta; 1988–1991 | Succeeded by Andrew Ziolkowski |
