= Albert Bruntnell =

Australian politician

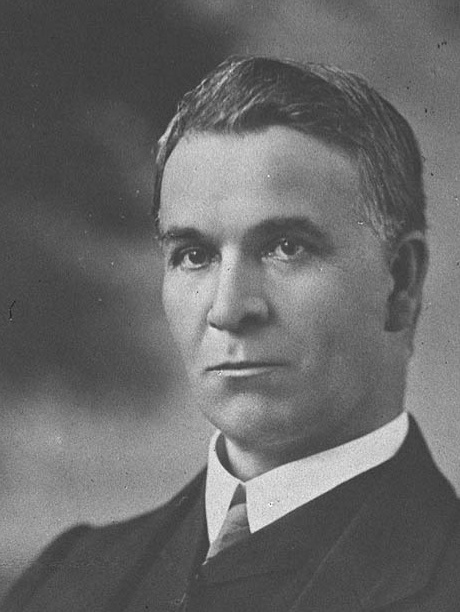
Albert Bruntnell, Minister for Health

Albert Bruntnell (4 August 1866 – 31 January 1929) was an Australian politician. He was a member of the New South Wales Legislative Assembly from 1906 until his death and held a number of ministerial positions in the Government of New South Wales. He was a conservative and at various times he represented the Liberal and Reform and the Nationalist parties.

== Early life ==
Bruntnell was born in Breconshire, Wales. His father was a master blacksmith and he was educated to elementary level at National schools. Bruntnell was trained as a tailor but in 1885 he joined the Salvation Army and attended the Salvation Army Training School. Following graduation, his first appointment as a Salvation Army Officer was to accompany Commissioner Howard to Australia in 1888. He remained in Australia and was promoted to captain in Melbourne in 1889. Bruntnell reached the rank of Brigadier by 1897 when he became the colonial commanding officer in Victoria. He later held the same position in Queensland in 1900 and New South Wales in 1903. However, he was forced to resign his position in 1903 after accepting a personal gift from the New South Wales Alliance for the Suppression of Intemperance, which then employed him as its secretary. He maintained a life-time interest in Temperance and was a Freemason. Together with premier Charles Wade he was a key supporter of the Australian Protestant Defence Association. During his parliamentary career he also worked as a Real estate agent and auctioneer.

== Political career ==
In 1906, during a Legislative Assembly debate over a land corruption scandal, John Norton the member for Surry Hills challenged William Holman, the Labor member for Cootamundra and a future premier, to resign his seat so that Norton could contest a by-election directly against him. When the challenge was accepted, Norton was compelled to resign from his own seat precipitating a by-election in Surry Hills, which was held on 14 July 1906. Bruntnell stood as the Liberal and Reform candidate and won with 30% of the vote. Norton finished 4th with 18%.

At the next state election held on 10 September 1907, Bruntnell chose to contest the seat of Alexandria but lost to the Labor Party candidate John Dacey. Bruntnell was absent from parliament until the general election of 1910 when he won the seat of Annandale by 200 votes (1.18%). He was, however, defeated at the next election by Arthur Griffith. Bruntnell was finally able to secure a safe, conservative voting seat, at the 1916 by-election for the seat of Parramatta. This election was caused by the death of Thomas Moxham. Bruntnell continued to represent Parramatta until his death.

== Ministerial career ==
Bruntnell was the Minister of Public Health for the last two months of the Nationalist government of premier William Holman. He was the Minister of Public Instruction in the Fuller government from 1922 till 1925. In this position he instituted a pledge of loyalty to the flag to counter what he viewed as disloyalty amongst Irish-Australian Catholics. He also re-introduced fees for public high schools.

When Fuller resigned as leader of the Nationalists he narrowly lost the leadership ballot to Bavin. He served as Colonial Secretary in Bavin's government from 1927 till his death.

New South Wales Legislative Assembly
Preceded by John Norton	Member for Surry Hills; 1906–1907	Succeeded by James Graham
Preceded by William Mahony	Member for Annandale; 1910–1913	Succeeded by Arthur Griffith
Preceded by Thomas Moxham	Member for Parramatta; 1916–1929; With: none / Jack Lang / none none / Bill Ely / Thomas Morrow / Bill Ely / none	Succeeded by Herbert Lloyd
Political offices
Preceded by David Storey	Minister of Public Health; 1924	Succeeded by Greg McGirr as Minister of Public Health and Motherhood
Preceded by Thomas Mutch	Minister of Public Instruction; 1922 – 1925	Succeeded by Thomas Mutch as Minister for Education
Preceded by Mark Gosling	Colonial Secretary; 1927 – 1929	Succeeded by Thomas Bavin
