= Tom Moxham =

Australian politician

Thomas Robert Moxham (1 April 1860 – 11 January 1916) was an Australian politician.

He was born in Parramatta to storekeeper Robert Henry Moxham and Martha Dick. He attended the local All Saints denominational school before joining his brother William in a quarrying business. He also had interests in horse trading, orchards and property. In 1883 he married Mary Agnes Somers at Newcastle; they had five children. He was an alderman on Parramatta Council from 1886 to 1901, serving as mayor from 1897. In 1901 he was elected to the New South Wales Legislative Assembly as the member for Parramatta, representing the Liberal Party. Succeeding John Nobbs from Granville he was party whip from 1913 until his death at Parramatta in 1916.

New South Wales Legislative Assembly
Preceded by William Ferris	Member for Parramatta; 1901–1916	Succeeded by Albert Bruntnell
