= William Ferris (politician) =

Politician from New South Wales, Australia

William John Ferris (1855 – 24 April 1917) was an Australian politician.

He was born in Parramatta to general dealer James Ferris and Bridget Cogan. He ran a Catholic orphan school for some time before joining his brother in a real estate business around 1884. On 15 April 1885 he married Eleanor Alicia Jamieson, with whom he had four children. A Parramatta alderman, he was twice mayor. In 1898 he was elected to the New South Wales Legislative Assembly as the Protectionist member for Parramatta. The result was voided in October 1898 due to polling irregularities, but Ferris was re-elected at the by-election. He was defeated in 1901. Ferris died at Parramatta in 1917.

New South Wales Legislative Assembly
Preceded by Dowell O'Reilly	Member for Parramatta; 1898–1901	Succeeded by Tom Moxham
