= Electoral district of Parramatta =

State electoral district of New South Wales, Australia

Parramatta New South Wales—Legislative Assembly
- Interactive map of district boundaries from the 2023 state election
- State: New South Wales
- Dates current: 1856–present
- MP: Donna Davis
- Party: Labor
- Namesake: Parramatta
- Electors: 57,995 (2023)
- Area: 36 km^{2} (13.9 sq mi)
- Demographic: Inner-metropolitan
Electorates around Parramatta:
Winston Hills	Epping	Ryde
Winston Hills; Granville	Parramatta	Drummoyne
Granville	Auburn; Granville	Auburn; Strathfield

Parramatta is an electoral district of the Legislative Assembly in the Australian state of New South Wales. It was won by Donna Davis of the Labor Party in the 2023 NSW state election.

Parramatta is an urban electorate in Sydney's inner north-west, roughly analogous to the City of Parramatta.

== Geography ==
On its current boundaries, Parramatta takes in the suburbs of Camellia, Clyde, Ermington, Harris Park, Newington, Rosehill, Rydalmere, Silverwater, Sydney Olympic Park, and Wentworth Point, as well as part of Auburn, Dundas, Granville, Lidcombe, Mays Hill, Melrose Park, North Parramatta, North Rocks, Parramatta, and Westmead.

== History ==
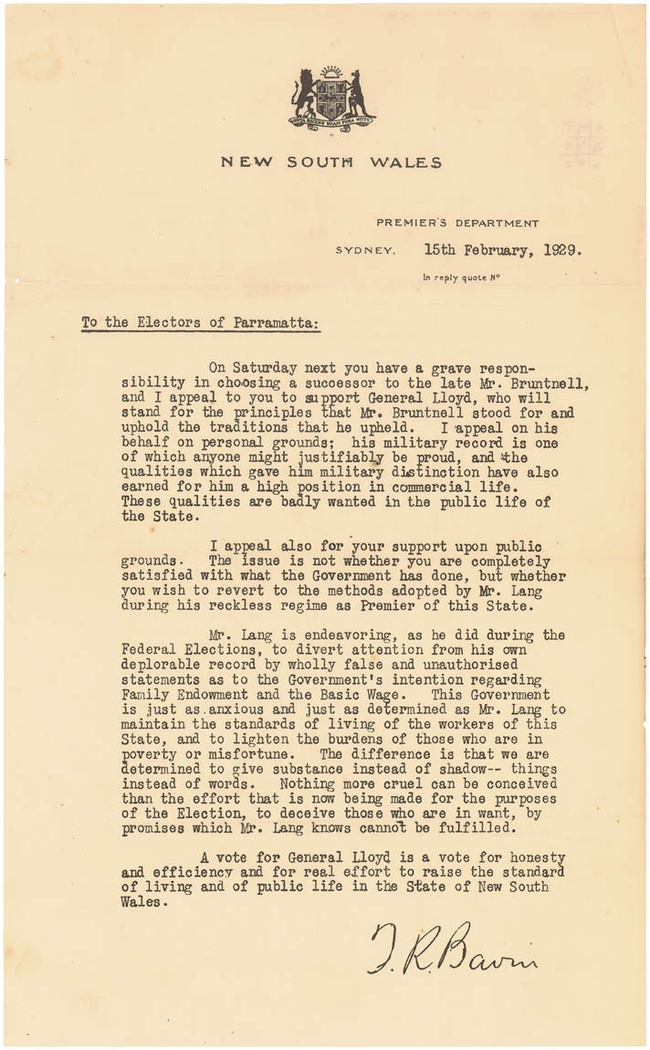
Letter by Sir Thomas Bavin to the electors of Parramatta to support the candidature of General Lloyd in 1929.

Parramatta is the only electorate to have existed continuously since the first Legislative Assembly election in 1856. It elected two members simultaneously from 1856 to 1880. In 1920, it absorbed Granville and elected three members under proportional representation. In 1927, it was divided into the single-member electorates of Parramatta, Granville and Auburn.

For most of its single member history since 1927 and prior to 2011 Parramatta was a safe Labor Party seat. Prior to 2011 it was last held by the Liberals by John Books from 1988 to 1991. The Liberal Party had hopes of winning back the seat at the 1994 by-election when it was a marginal ALP seat but the ALP retained the seat with a huge swing towards it.

Labor went into the 2011 election holding the seat with a margin of 13.1 percent, but Liberal challenger Geoff Lee won it on a swing of 25.8 percent, turning it into a safe Liberal seat in one stroke. He was reelected in 2015, the first time in over 60 years that the Liberals (or their predecessors) have been reelected in the seat's single member incarnation.

== Members for Parramatta ==
Two members (1856–1880)
Member	Party	Term	Member	Party	Term
Henry Parker	None	1856–1857	George Oakes	None	1856–1860
James Byrnes	None	1858–1861	George Oakes	None	1856–1860
James Byrnes	None	1858–1861	John Lackey	None	1860–1864
Arthur Holroyd	None	1861–1864	John Lackey	None	1860–1864
James Byrnes	None	1864–1872	James Farnell	None	1864–1874
Hugh Taylor	None	1872–1880	James Farnell	None	1864–1874
Hugh Taylor	None	1872–1880	Charles Byrnes	None	1874–1877
Hugh Taylor	None	1872–1880	William Long	None	1877–1880

Single-member (1880–1920)
Member	Party	Term
Charles Byrnes	None	1880–1882
Hugh Taylor	None	1882–1887
Hugh Taylor	Free Trade	1887–1894
Dowell O'Reilly	Ind. Free Trade	1894–1895
Dowell O'Reilly	Free Trade	1895–1898
William Ferris	Protectionist	1898–1901
Tom Moxham	Liberal Reform	1901–1916
Albert Bruntnell	Liberal Reform	1916–1917
Albert Bruntnell	Nationalist	1917–1920

Three members (1920–1927)
Member	Party	Term	Member	Party	Term	Member	Party	Term
Albert Bruntnell	Nationalist	1920–1927	Bill Ely	Labor	1920–1922	Jack Lang	Labor	1920–1927
Albert Bruntnell	Nationalist	1920–1927	Thomas Morrow	Nationalist	1922–1925	Jack Lang	Labor	1920–1927
Albert Bruntnell	Nationalist	1920–1927	Bill Ely	Labor	1925–1927	Jack Lang	Labor	1920–1927

Single-member (1927–present)
Member	Party	Term
Albert Bruntnell	Nationalist	1927–1929
Herbert Lloyd	Nationalist	1929–1930
Joseph Byrne	Labor	1930–1932
George Gollan	United Australia	1932–1945
George Gollan	Liberal	1945–1953
Kevin Morgan	Labor	1953–1956
Jim Clough	Liberal	1956–1959
Dan Mahoney	Labor	1959–1976
Barry Wilde	Labor	1976–1988
John Books	Liberal	1988–1991
Andrew Ziolkowski	Labor	1991–1994
Gabrielle Harrison	Labor	1994–2003
Tanya Gadiel	Labor	2003–2011
Geoff Lee	Liberal	2011–2023
Donna Davis	Labor	2023–present

== Election results ==
2023 New South Wales state election: Parramatta
Party	Candidate	Votes	%	±%
Labor	Donna Davis	22,704	47.0	+13.0
Liberal	Katie Mullens	17,152	35.5	−14.5
Greens	Ben Hammond	4,852	10.0	+2.1
One Nation	Mritunjay Singh	2,464	5.1	+5.1
Sustainable Australia	David Moll	1,109	2.3	+1.2
Total formal votes		48,281	96.9	+0.2
Informal votes		1,519	3.1	−0.2
Turnout		49,800	85.9	+2.4
Two-party-preferred result
Labor	Donna Davis	26,355	58.6	+15.0
Liberal	Katie Mullens	18,655	41.4	−15.0
Labor gain from Liberal		Swing	+15.0	
