= Antony Basten =

Australian physician and immunologist (born 1939)

Antony Basten AO FAA FTSE
- Basten in 2026
- Born: 3 August 1939 (age 87); Singapore
- Spouse: Susan Woolcock (m. 1964; died 2013)
- Children: 3
- Parent: Henry Basten (father)
- Relatives: John Basten (brother)

Academic background
- Education: University of Adelaide (MBBS); University of Oxford (DPhil)
- Thesis: Mechanism of eosinophilia (1969)
- Doctoral advisor: Paul Beeson
- Other advisor: Jacques Miller

Academic work
- Discipline: Immunology
- Institutions: Walter and Eliza Hall Institute of Medical Research
- Doctoral students: Graeme Stewart

Antony Basten (born 3 August 1938) is an Australian physician and immunologist.

Born to British civil servant Henry Bolton Basten, Antony Basten spent his early childhood in Singapore before moving to Adelaide in 1952. He completed a Bachelor of Medicine and Bachelor of Surgery from the University of Adelaide, and subsequently spent his clinical training at the Royal Adelaide Hospital. From 1966 to 1969, he studied under Paul Beeson and investigated eosinophilia for his Doctor of Philosophy at the University of Oxford.

Basten started his laboratory research at the Walter and Eliza Hall Institute of Medical Research in 1970 under the supervision of Jacques Miller. In the following year, Basten was appointed the first Professor of Immunology at University of Sydney in 1975. Along with Chris Goodnow, Basten worked on immune tolerance and regulation of B cells. Basten founded the Centenary Institute of Cancer Medicine and Cell Biology in 1989, being its first director. Basten did his research at Trinity College, Cambridge and Garvan Institute of Medical Research before establishing the Australasian Society of Clinical Immunology and Allergy in 1990.

== Early life and education ==
Antony Basten was born in Singapore on 3 August 1939, to Henry Bolton Basten, a British civil servant, and Mildred Minshall. His parents had emigrated to Singapore in 1934, and later to Adelaide in December 1952. In Singapore, Basten spent part of his childhood and lived at Keppel House. Basten enrolled in the University of Adelaide and graduated in 1963 with a Bachelor of Medicine and Bachelor of Surgery. Basten completed his postgraduate clinical training at the Royal Adelaide Hospital, first as a junior resident medical officer and then junior registrar in 1964 and 1965, respectively.

As a Nuffield Dominions Trust Clinical Assistant, Basten then attended the University of Oxford's Nuffield Department of Medicine in early 1966. He chose to research the mechanisms of eosinophilia after Paul Beeson suggested either eosinophilia or iodide therapy for granuloma for his research projects. Immediately thereafter, he became Beeson's first doctor of philosophy student. His experiments on parasite-infected rats were conducted at the Radcliffe Infirmary. Basten investigated the mechanisms underlying eosinophilia under Beeson's supervision. In 1969, he was promoted to senior house officer after completing his time as a clinical assistant a year prior. In that same year, Basten obtained his Doctor of Philosophy from Oxford in 1969. Following his postgraduate studies, he remained at the university for a further year as a senior resident working in clinical service under Beeson.

== Career ==
Basten began work as a postdoctoral researcher at the Walter and Eliza Hall Institute of Medical Research in Melbourne from 1970 to 1971. Later, he was awarded a position as a Queen Elizabeth II Postdoctoral Research Fellow. He worked in the laboratory of immunologist Jacques Miller during this period. In 1972, Basten was appointed senior lecturer in immunology at the University of Sydney and consultant physician at Royal Prince Alfred Hospital. Afterwards, at the age of 36, he was made the first Professor of Immunology and chair in immunology at the University of Sydney in 1975. Basten and Miller were the joint presidents of the Australian Society for Immunology in 1978 and became the sole president in 1979.

In 1982, Basten's Immunology Research Unit was recognised by the Fraser government as one of ten Australian Centres of Excellence for research. Thereafter, he was made Division of Medicine head at Royal Prince Alfred Hospital. He also worked as a consultant at several hospitals in New South Wales such as Royal Alexandra Hospital for Children, Royal North Shore Hospital and Royal Newcastle Hospital. Subsequently, Basten worked alongside the Hawke government as a medical and scientific adviser on AIDS, following his appointment as an executive on the Australian National Council on AIDS and chair of the National AIDS Task Force in 1987. He called for the development of vaccine and immunology of mycobacterial diseases while part of the World Health Organization steering groups.

Basten returned to the University of Sydney as director of its Clinical Immunology Research Centre and in 1989 was appointed founding director of the Centenary Institute of Cancer Medicine and Cell Biology. He saw the institute become an independent research institute, expanded its research programs and raised funds for a dedicated research facility at Royal Prince Alfred Hospital. During the period between the 1980s and 1990s, Basten researched in the area of immune tolerance and the regulation of B cell responses. Working with Chris Goodnow, monoclonal antibody and transgenic techniques were implemented to look into how self-reactive B cells are deleted, inhibited or regulated to prevent autoimmune responses. Basten retired as Head of Department of Clinical Immunology at Royal Prince Alfred Hospital in 1990. Later on, he became the founding president of the Australasian Society of Clinical Immunology and Allergy (ASCIA) from 1990 and 1992.

In 2000, Basten was the chair of the World Allergy Congress held in Sydney. After retiring from the Centenary Institute, he was appointed Visiting Fellow Commoner at Trinity College, Cambridge. Immediately thereafter, Basten returned to full-time research. That same year, he was later appointed Emeritus Professor at the University of Sydney in 2006. Basten was then attached to the MRC Laboratory of Molecular Biology during his time at Trinity College. Subsequently, he was appointed Conjoint Professor of Medicine at the University of New South Wales and Emeritus Fellow of the Garvan Institute of Medical Research.

Basten joined Gregory Winter as a visiting fellow at the University of Cambridge and conducted research during his sabbatical in 2007. He returned to the Garvan Institute to continue research into immune regulation and mechanisms involved in autoimmune and allergic diseases with its B Cell Biology group. He was elected non-executive director of BioTech Capital Limited and Apollo Life Sciences and a member of the Scientific Advisory Board of Human Genetic Signatures.

In 2012, Basten was among the 12 Australian experts who raised awareness about vaccination and addressed concerns about immunisation. He later co-chaired an Australian Academy of Science working party, which investigated vaccination and updated the academy's vaccine information. Two years later, he once again joined 11 other Australian medical researchers and public health experts in signing an open letter published in the Medical Journal of Australia. The letter called on the Abbott government to include the health effects of human-caused climate change on the 2014 G20 Brisbane summit agenda. In 2023, Basten was appointed an expert in insect allergy to the International Scientific Advisory Board of the National Allergy Centre of Excellence.

== Honours and awards ==
Basten was elected a Fellow of the Royal College of Physicians (FRCP) in 1970 and a Fellow of the Royal College of Pathologists of Australasia (FRCPA) in 1972. He became a Fellow of the Royal Australasian College of Physicians (FRACP) in 1975. In 1979, Basten received National Health and Medical Research Council Program Grants. He received the inaugural Wellcome Australia Medal in 1980. Furthermore, Basten was one of seven Australians included in the ranking of the 1,000 most highly cited scientists worldwide.

Basten was elected a Fellow of the Australian Academy of Technological Sciences and Engineering (FTSE) in 1981. In 1982, he was awarded funding from Commonwealth Centres of Excellence for his research. The Australian Society for Microbiology invited him to deliver the 1984 Rubbo Oration. In recognition of his work on immunology, Basten was appointed an Officer of the Order of Australia (AO) in the 1988 Australia Day Honours. Later, he was elected a Fellow of the Australian Academy of Science (FAA) in 1992. In 1996, Rotary International presented him with a Vocational Excellence Award.

appreciation of his contributions to Australian society and immunology research, Basten was awarded the Centenary Medal in 2003. In 2006, the Basten Oration was created by ASCIA in acknowledgement of his contributions to clinical immunology and allergy, service as the first president, and as chair of the World Allergy Congress. The oration has since been delivered annually. Throughout his scientific career, Basten has more than 300 international scientific journal publications and supervised more than 50 postgraduate students. In 2025, Basten received an honorary doctorate from the University of Adelaide.

== Personal life ==
His brother, John, served as a New South Wales Court of Appeal judge between 2005 and 2022. On 9 May 1964, Basten married Susan Jane Woolcock, a former netballer. She died in 2013. They have three children together.

== Selected publications ==
- Basten, Antony; Beeson, Paul B. (1 June 1970). "Mechanism of eosinophilia. II. Role of the lymphocyte" (PDF). The Journal of Experimental Medicine. 131 (6): 1288–1305. doi:10.1084/jem.131.6.1288. PMC 2138837. PMID 5419272. Archived from the original (PDF) on 25 November 2024.
- Goodnow, Christopher C.; Crosbie, Jeffrey; Jorgensen, Helle; Brink, Robert A.; Basten, Antony (23 November 1989). "Induction of self-tolerance in mature peripheral B lymphocytes". Nature. 342 (6248): 385–391. Bibcode:1989Natur.342..385G. doi:10.1038/342385a0. PMID 2586609.
- Goodnow, Christopher C.; Adelstein, Stephen; Basten, Antony (15 June 1990). "The need for central and peripheral tolerance in the B cell repertoire". Science. 248 (4961): 1373–1379. Bibcode:1990Sci...248.1373G. doi:10.1126/science.2356469. JSTOR 2874448. PMID 2356469.
- Adams, Elizabeth; Basten, Antony; Goodnow, Christopher C. (August 1990). "Intrinsic B-cell hyporesponsiveness accounts for self-tolerance in lysozyme/anti-lysozyme double-transgenic mice". Proceedings of the National Academy of Sciences of the United States of America. 87 (15): 5687–5691. Bibcode:1990PNAS...87.5687A. doi:10.1073/pnas.87.15.5687. PMC 54392. PMID 2143020.
- Fulcher, David A.; Lyons, A. Bruce; Korn, S. L.; Cook, M. C.; Koleda, C.; Parish, C.; Fazekas de St Groth, Barbara; Basten, Antony (1 May 1996). "The fate of self-reactive B cells depends primarily on the degree of antigen receptor engagement and availability of T cell help". The Journal of Experimental Medicine. 183 (5): 2313–2328. doi:10.1084/jem.183.5.2313. PMC 2192557. PMID 8642340.
- Basten, Antony; Silveira, Patricia A. (October 2010). "B-cell tolerance: mechanisms and implications". Current Opinion in Immunology. 22 (5): 566–574. doi:10.1016/j.coi.2010.08.001. PMID 20829011.
- Langley, David B.; Schofield, Peter; Nevoltris, Damien; Jackson, Jennifer; Jackson, Katherine J. L.; Peters, Tim J.; Burk, Melanie; Matthews, Jacqueline M.; Basten, Antony; Goodnow, Christopher C.; van Nunen, Sheryl; Reed, Joanne H.; Christ, Daniel (12 July 2022). "Genetic and structural basis of the human anti-α-galactosyl antibody response". Proceedings of the National Academy of Sciences of the United States of America. 119 (28) e2123212119. Bibcode:2022PNAS..11923212L. doi:10.1073/pnas.2123212119. PMC 9282431. PMID 35867757.
