= Jeremy Chapman =

British-Australian nephrologist

Professor Jeremy Chapman AC FRACP FRCP FAHMS
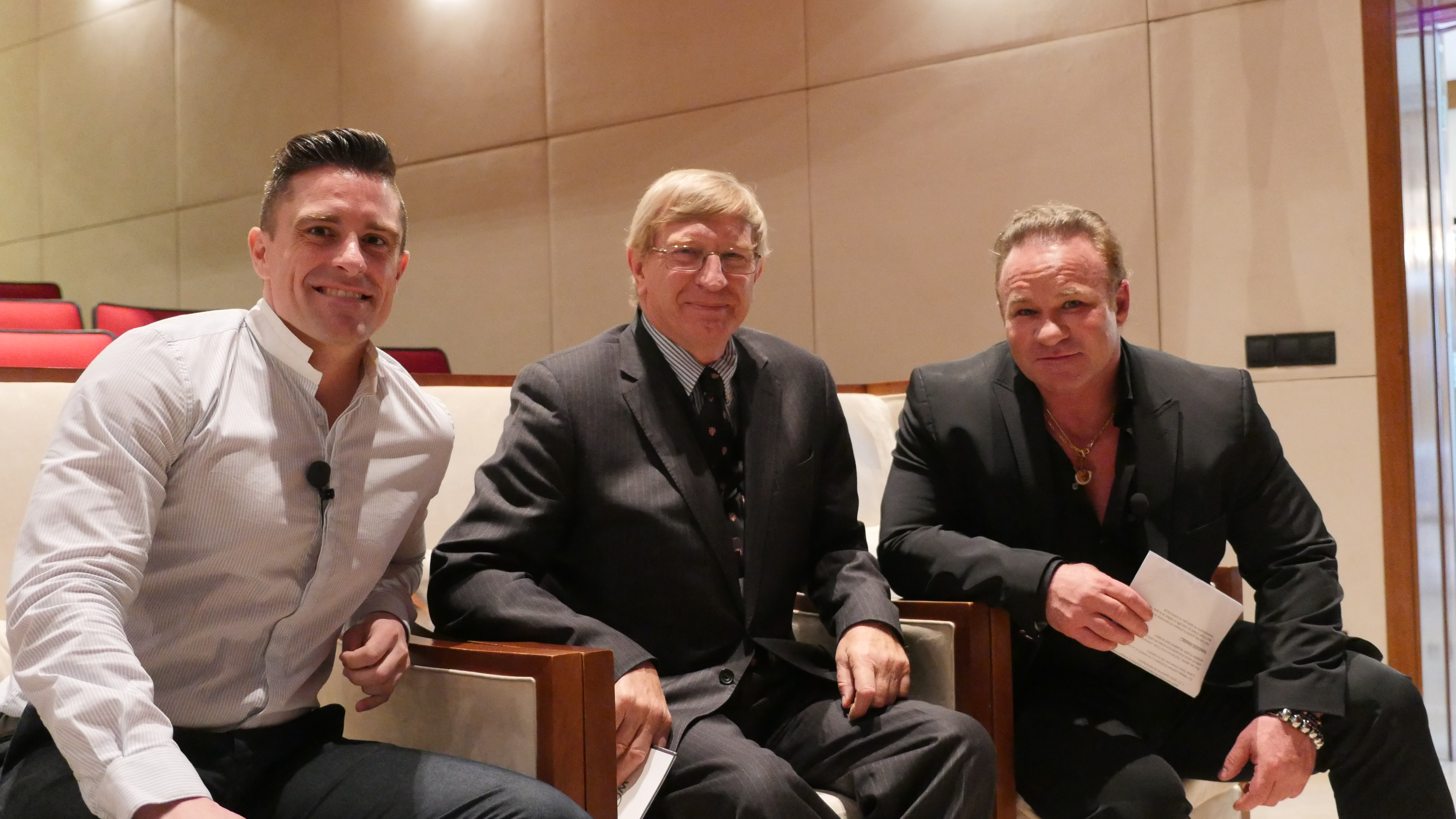
- Sitting between Eric Favre and Stephane Etienne, 2016
- Born: Jeremy Robert Chapman; 20 September 1953 (age 73); London, England, United Kingdom
- Citizenship: Australian
- Education: Sevenoaks School; University of Cambridge
- Occupations: Nephrologist; Renal physician; Transplant surgeon
- Employer(s): Westmead Hospital; The University of Sydney; Westmead Millennium Institute
- Spouse: Clare Harris
- Children: 3

Jeremy Robert Chapman (born 20 September 1953) is a British–Australian nephrologist, renal physician and transplant surgeon. He has been the director of the Division of Medicine and Cancer at Westmead Hospital in Sydney since 2007.

== Early life and education ==
Chapman was born in London, England and educated at Sevenoaks School in Kent. He studied medicine at the University of Cambridge, gaining a Bachelor of Medicine, Bachelor of Surgery (MB BChir), Master of Arts (MA) and Doctor of Medicine (MD).

From 1984 to 1987, he was a lecturer and research fellow at the University of Oxford.

== Career ==
Chapman migrated to Australia in 1987, and commenced lecturing at the University of Sydney and practising medicine at the newly opened Westmead Hospital.

Chapman is a board member of the Western Sydney Local Health District, Westmead Medical Research Foundation, and is chairman, Australian Bone Marrow Donor Registry, since 1991 and Manager of the Australian National Kidney Matching Service, since 1988. He served as President of The Transplantation Society between 2008 and 2010.

== Awards and honours ==
In 2014, Expertscape named Professor Chapman the world's leading expert in kidney transplantation.

He was awarded the Medal of the Order of Australia in 2003 for establishment of the Australian Bone Marrow Donor Registry. In 2015, he was appointed as a Companion of the Order of Australia for eminent service to medicine, particularly in the areas of clinical and biomedical research, to the development of ethical policy and practices for organ donation, acquisition and transplantation, and to renal medicine organisations and publications. Chapman was elected Fellow of the Australian Academy of Health and Medical Sciences in 2017.
