= CMRI =

CMRI may refer to:

- Children's Medical Research Institute, an Australian scientific research group
- Computer Model Railroad Interface
- Congregatio Mariae Reginae Immaculatae or Congregation of Mary Immaculate Queen, a sedevacantist Catholic religious congregation
