= Nancy Cook (disambiguation) =

Nancy Cook (1884–1962) was an American suffragist, educator, political organizer, businesswoman, and friend of Eleanor Roosevelt.

Nancy Cook may also refer to:

- Nancy Atkinson (1910–1999), Australian bacteriologist
- Nancy W. Cook (1936–2026), American politician
- Nancy Wright (1917–1994), Welsh golfer
