= Graeme Stewart (immunology) =

Australian professor of immunology and medical researcher (born 1946)

- Born: 1946 (age 79–80)
- Education: BSc(Med) MBBS PhD
- Known for: Genetic contributions to Multiple Sclerosis
- Medical career
- Profession: Clinical Professor of Medicine
- Field: Immunology
- Institutions: University of Sydney; Westmead Hospital

Graeme John Stewart (born 1946) is an Australian consultant physician, medical researcher in the field of immunology, and a community health advocate. He is Clinical Professor of Medicine in the Westmead Institute for Medical Research within the University of Sydney.

Since the 1970s, his research has focussed on the genetic bases of HIV/AIDS, Multiple Sclerosis, and inherited diseases. The biggest project was leading the Australasian component of the International Multiple Sclerosis Genetics Consortium (IMSGC) that identified the 57 genes which are involved in multiple sclerosis. He founded and led the Department of Clinical Immunology and Allergy at Westmead Hospital, and the Institute for Immunology and Allergy Research (IIAR) at the Westmead Millennium Institute.

In 2002 he was appointed a Member of the Order of Australia for his contributions to health policy, medical education, and research. Stewart retired from clinical practice in 2021, although he continues his research and teaching roles.

== Early life and education ==
Stewart studied medicine at the University of Sydney, graduating with an MBBS in 1970. He went on to pursue a PhD at the same university; his thesis was published in 1980, on "The HLA system and multiple sclerosis" and he graduated in 1981.

== Medical career ==
Stewart was appointed to the role of Clinical Professor of Medicine at the Westmead Institute for Medical Research, in the Faculty of Medicine and Health, University of Sydney in 2005. His career has encompassed conducting research into the genetic contributions to auto-immune diseases, setting up and running medical organizations, in addition to his academic role. His clinical speciality is infection and immunity.

In 2021 he retired from clinical practice. He continues his research into Multiple Sclerosis at the Westmead Institute for Medical Research and also his teaching role at the University of Sydney.

=== HIV/AIDS research ===
Steward was heavily involved in dealing with the AIDS pandemic.

In September 1985, he published in The Lancet the first evidence that HIV had been transmitted by artificial insemination. This followed four cases where women were believed to have been infected during IVF procedures with infected sperm in 1982, before the disease was well known and there were no testing procedures. He championed testing all sperm donors for AIDS.

In 1988, he was an organizer of a six-week international course to train senior clinicians and nursing educators from ten countries, which was organized in conjunction with the World Health Organization Regional Training Centre for Training Development. Later that year, he attended an international AIDS conference in Stockholm, and realized the need for a professional body in Australia which specialized in the field. On his return, he set up the Australian Society of AIDS Physicians, now called the Australasian Society for HIV, Viral Hepatitis and Sexual Health Medicine (ASHM) to co-ordinate communication and support between different medical disciplines that are involved with the disease.

He wrote the book Could it Be HIV? in 1993 which was published by the Medical Journal of Australia, who sent a copy to every doctor to help them identify the disease sooner. In 1993 he summarized the extent of the problem of undetected cases: up to 75% of people who became sick from AIDS had never been tested for the virus, and 30% of sufferers first discovered that they had the virus after their illness became medically serious. He urged doctors to take a more active role in testing patients, especially those who were at higher risk. In 1996 he published a seven-part series for general practitioners in The Medical journal of Australia on "Managing HIV", aiming to disseminate the most important lessons learned to date. This was published as the book Managing HIV, also published by the Medical Journal of Australia, and funded by the Commonwealth Department of Health. In 1996, aware that people around the world who get infected with HIV will not receive the benefits of advanced medical treatment, he published a set of guidelines to show how each country can work with its limited health resources to provide the best possible care.

Early indications that an inherited defect in the CCR5 gene would give immunity, and that this might be used to develop a vaccine or drugs, were thwarted by the discovery of a man who had the defect yet had caught AIDS. In a 1997 paper in Nature Medicine, Stewart and collaborators found that the defect is nevertheless partially protective, since it appears in about 1% of the population yet this study found only that one subject out of 3000 who had the defect and caught AIDS. His research also looked into associated areas such as periodontitis (gum disease) progress in HIV positive patients.

In 1999, Stewart was appointed to chair the committee that provided expert advice about the program of research into HIV/AIDS.

=== Multiple Sclerosis research ===
Stewart started studying Multiple Sclerosis (MS) in 1975. It is a progressive disease, where the patient's own immune system attacks and destroys the myelin insulation covering nerves, which means they are less able to conduct signals, causing paralysis and distorted sensation (typically pain, numbness, and pins & needles). The disease affects around 2.5 million people around the world. Nearly two-thirds of sufferers are unable to keep a full-time job. Research continues into the reason why this disease process happens.

A combination of genetic and environmental factors have long been suspected to contribute to which people develop MS, but it has proven to be very difficult to identify the exact causes. This has led to widespread speculation which is not supported by evidence, which Stewart has helped to counter. In 1998, Stewart wrote about a Scottish court case where the family of an MS sufferer attempted to blame it on a traffic accident. In 2002, he pointed out that claims by Dr Christopher Hawkes that MS was caused by sexual promiscuity or sexual abuse were not supported by any evidence, calling them "pure speculation". In 2009, he published a paper showing how certain members of the vitamin D family interacted with genetic variations to affect T-cell functioning in ways that could increase the risk of developing MS.

Stewart led the Australia and New Zealand contingent in the International Multiple Sclerosis Genetics Consortium (IMSGC) that identified the 57 genes which combine in subtle ways to change the function of the immune system in ways that can lead to multiple sclerosis (MS). It was known through epidemiological studies that relatives of people with MS were at significantly higher risk of having the condition themselves, so increasingly sophisticated genetic studies had been conducted. The IMSGC study involved groups with over 250 researchers from 15 countries with over 27,000 people of whom 9,772 had MS, in order to identify the genetic architecture that makes people susceptible to MS. The results were published in Nature in 2011. Stewart was also a governance member of the IMSGC and a member of the Project Direction Committee for the Nature study. The study also found that vitamin D played an important role.

A related paper in the journal PLoS Genetics showed that there was an unexpectedly high level of genetic commonality between autoimmune (AI) diseases: of the 107 genetic variants that are linked to an AI disease, nearly half are also found in at least one other AI disease.

=== Other research ===
In 2012, Stewart joined with orthopaedic surgeons and other specialists to develop a risk assessment tool called POSSUM, which accurately predicted the chances of mortality and morbidity from orthopaedic surgeries.

=== Medical administrator ===
Stewart founded the Department of Clinical Immunology and Allergy at Westmead Hospital, and he served as its head.

In 1996, he founded the Institute for Immunology and Allergy Research (IIAR) at the Westmead Millennium Institute (now known as the Westmead Institute for Medical Research), and he served as its director. His philosophy was that "clinical care is best delivered with teaching, training and research.” The IIAR was one of the Westmead Millennium Institute's four founding research groups.

In 2000, Stewart was appointed to a Clinical Council which oversaw the implementation of the state government's $2 billion program of health reforms. He serves on the Scientific Research Committee of the Trish MS Research Foundation.

=== Community engagement ===
When the COVID-19 pandemic spread, Stewart wrote for newspapers and spoke on radio shows to educate the public about the disease, its management, and vaccination. He emphasized the distinction between people who were the "vaccine hesitant" and those who were "vaccine resistant". He had a recurring half-hour segment on ABC Radio's afternoon show, and he repeated the same themes in medical journals, giving a broader perspective to General Practitioners.

He has been called as an expert witness on legal cases. In 1999, he testified to the NSW Supreme Court in a case about AIDS protocols for physicians. In 2004, he was selected to join the expert panel evaluating charges that well-known immunologist Bruce Hall had acquired research grants on the basis of falsified results, and subsequent controversy about how the new vice chancellor handled the case.

In 2013, Stewart partnered with his brother Richard Stewart to raise money for MS research by holding the "Kiss Goodbye to MS" campaign in conjunction with Whale Beach's Big Swim.

Stewart is a board member of NSW Health Pathology and Multiple Sclerosis Research Australia. He is a researcher at the Children's Medical Research Institute, he has served on its board since 2002, and he is the chair of the institute's Intellectual Property Committee.

== Awards and recognition ==
In the 2002 Queen's Birthday honours, Stewart was appointed a Member of the Order of Australia (AM) in recognition of his "service to the development of health policy and medical education about HIV and AIDS, to medicine in the field of immunology, and to research on the genetics of multiple sclerosis".

In 2015, he was made a Fellow of the Royal Society of New South Wales.

== Published works ==
Stewart wrote the following books:

- Stewart, Graeme, ed. (2013) [1994]. Could it be HIV? : the clinical recognition of HIV infection (4th ed.). North Sydney, N.S.W.: Australasian Medical Pub. Co. ISBN 978-0855570330.
  First appeared as a series of articles in The Medical Journal of Australia.
- Stewart, Graeme, ed. (1997). Managing HIV ((latest ed. 2021) ed.). North Sydney, NSW: Australasian Medical Pub. Co. ISBN 0855570369.

He is extensively published in academic journals. As of March 2022, ResearchGate lists 315 journal publications, which have been cited 13,992 times. Scopus lists 233 publications (169 as Graeme John Stewart, with an h-index of 44, and another 64 as Graeme J Stewart). PubMed lists 62 publications.
