= Glynde Nesta Griffiths =

Australian author and philanthropist (1889 – 1968)

- Born: 4 July 1889; Double Bay
- Died: 4 June 1968 (aged 78)
- Writing career
- Genre: Local history
- Subject: Houses of New South Wales

(Glynde) Nesta Griffiths (4 July 1889 – 4 June 1968) was an Australian author and philanthropist. Nesta wrote about the houses of New South Wales and left her substantial estate to support the Children's Medical Research Institute. She lived all her life with her elder sister Gwendolin Winifred Griffiths.

== Life ==
Griffiths was born in the Sydney suburb of Double Bay in 1889. Her parents were the Australian Annette Agnes (born Willis) and the British born merchant Frederick Close Griffiths. She was the last of their three daughters named Gwyneth, Gwendolen and Glynde.

Edith who was also from the Willis family and her husband Edward Knox had four daughters and the seven girls received a joint private education. Tutors were employed to cover different subjects at Point Piper. Life changed in 1907 when their father died and his estate was confused.

The three daughters went into teaching. Gwendolen taught maths and Glynde and Gwyneth became dance teachers. In 1910 Gwendolen and Glynde (known as Nesta) were left at home when Gwyneth married. Their mother died in 1929 and they established a flat for themselves in Silchester which was increasingly well furnished as Gwendolin discovered that she had a talent for investment.

She was a founding member of the women-only MacQuarie Club (c.1928) and she joined the Royal Australian Historical Society. Her interest in local history led to the publication of her first book, Point Piper Past and Present in 1947. Sydney Ure Smith who was interested in recording Australian colonial history arranged for its publication. Her books were not academic or perfect but the inclusion of interesting snippets added to their appeal. In her 1947 book she recorded rings, now on dry land, which were said by Aborigines to be where big ships were birthed and she reported "carvings of Conquisadors".

Her writing inspired interest in the influential architect John Verge who had designed many important early colonial buildings in her books. She wrote three more books, Some Houses and People of New South Wales in 1949 was the next. The next covered the same subject. Some Southern Homes of New South Wales and Some Northern Homes of New South Wales were published in 1952 and 1954.

Griffiths was very supportive of the work of Lorimer Dods. He had become a professor in 1950 and his work was to improve children's health. He had founded the Children's Medical Research Foundation. She and Gwendolin both died in 1968. Nesta left £300,000 to the Children's Medical Research Foundation.
