= Ernest Wong =

Australian politician

- 王國忠

Member of the New South Wales Legislative Council
- In office 24 May 2013 – 23 March 2019
- Preceded by: Eric Roozendaal

Personal details
- Born: circa 1960 Hong Kong
- Party: Australian Labor Party (2005–present)
- Other political affiliations: Unity Party (2003–2005)
- Spouse: Rita Lee
- Children: 2
- Education: Macquarie University

Ernest Kwok Chung Wong (Chinese: 王國忠) is a Hong Kong-born Australian politician who was an Australian Labor Party member of the New South Wales Legislative Council from 2013 to 2019.

== Personal and early life ==
Ernest Wong was born in Hong Kong and studied at Wah Yan College, Kowloon, a prestigious Roman Catholic secondary school for boys. Run by the Chinese Province of the Society of Jesus, it was the first English-speaking college in Kowloon.

Wong migrated to Australia in 1979 to continue his studies, finishing year 12 at Sydney Boys High School and he graduated with a degree in commerce and law from Macquarie University. Wong is married with two children and is fluent in English, Cantonese and Mandarin.

Prior to his appointment to the Legislative Council of New South Wales, Wong was an active member of the community including the Lions Club, the Westmead Medical Research Foundation, sporting clubs and aged care advocacy groups.

== Political career ==
=== Local government ===
Wong has a long history of engagement with the community, in particular, vulnerable groups. He established the Special Children Service Centre in 2008 to assist children of diverse cultural backgrounds with intellectual impairment and has been appointed Life Honorary President of the charitable organisation. He continues to be an advisor to several aged care/nursing homes and had acted as a Director on the board of the Westmead Hospital Medical Research Foundation for seven years before he was elected to the NSW Parliament.

Before Wong was elected to the NSW Legislative Council, he worked on several political and community platforms. He served on the Burwood Council, including terms as Mayor and Deputy Mayor, elected on Unity Party tickets from 2000. Unity Party was a small multicultural political party founded in 1997 with the aim of opposing the rise of controversial anti-immigration politician Pauline Hanson. In his first year as an elected councillor on the Burwood Council, Wong established the very first Multicultural Committee and subsequently chaired several council committees such as the Sandakan Committee, Access Committee, Business Centre Steering Committee and the Safety Committee. At the 2003 NSW state election, Wong headed a multicultural upper house ticket for the Unity Party.

Subsequently, in 2005, Wong joined the Labor Party. He was an upper house candidate for Labor in the 2011 NSW state election, placed eighth on the party ticket; and has served as the citizenship advisor to the Premier of New South Wales and as a community relations advisor to Labor.

=== New South Wales State Parliament ===
At a special joint sitting of the New South Wales Legislative Council and the New South Wales Legislative Assembly held on 23 May 2013, Wong was appointed to fill a casual vacancy in the council, following the resignation of former Labor treasurer Eric Roozendaal who was suspended from the Labor Party in November 2012.

A strong advocate for social justice and equality in a culturally diverse Australia, Wong's areas of policy interest include community development, equal opportunity and social harmony. Multiculturalism and anti-discrimination are two particular areas of political discourse in his narrative.

He serves on various parliamentary committees, including the Select Committees on The Impact of Gambling and Human Trafficking in New South Wales. His speeches include "Poverty in Australia", "Depression" and "Social Enterprise Initiative". Currently, he is pursuing an inquiry in the NSW Upper House to end homelessness in NSW. In addition, Wong has been very vocal on the Japanese imperial invasion of China during the Second World War, delivering numerous speeches related to the war and comfort women.

In May 2017, Wong was one of three Labor MPs to vote with the Liberal Party and National Party to block a bill to decriminalise abortion in the state. He also voted down other bills such as NSW Parliament bill to legalise same-sex marriage in 2014 and the assisted dying bill in parliament in November 2017.

Wong has been reported as a prolific fundraiser for the Labor Party through his association with Huang Xiangmo, a billionaire with close ties to the Chinese Communist Party. In June 2018 it was reported that Australian security agencies detected that Wong was being cultivated by Chinese government intelligence operatives as part of a long-term operation.

In 2018 it was reported that Wong had been removed from a winnable position on the Labor Party Upper House ticket for the 2019 state election. He did not contest the 2019 state election.

==== Independent Commission Against Corruption inquiry ====
Post his political career, in 2019 Wong appeared before the NSW Independent Commission Against Corruption public inquiry into allegations concerning political donations, the NSW Branch of the Australian Labor Party (ALP), members of Chinese Friends of Labor and others. Wong was accused of giving false evidence under oath to the inquiry, including details of how Labor received funds following a 2015 fundraising event. At the centre of allegations ICAC put to Wong was that he had secured a donation from Huang Xiangmo, who, as a property developer, was banned from making political donations; and that Wong had engaged in a scheme to have individuals falsely fill out donation disclosure forms. At the time of the fundraising event, Wong was a member of the NSW Legislative Council. Subsequently, ICAC found that Wong had acted corruptly and sought the advice of the Director of Public Prosecutions on whether to pursue prosecution.

Civic offices
Preceded by	Mayor of Burwood; 2003 – ????	Succeeded by
