= Graeme Stewart =

Graeme Stewart may refer to:

- Graeme Stewart (immunology) (born 1946), Australian medical researcher
- Graeme Stewart, American politician; see 1899 Chicago mayoral election and 1903 Chicago mayoral election
