= Douglas Burrows =

Australian stock broker, businessman and philanthropist

- Born: 7 August 1915; Sydney
- Died: 10 December 1982 (aged 67); Sydney
- Education: Newington College
- Occupation: Stock broker
- Spouse: Valma Burrows (née Ashcroft)
- Children: 2 sons and 1 daughter
- Parent(s): Rita (née Squire) and Harry Irving Burrows

Douglas Squire Irving Burrows CBE (Civil) MBE (Military) (7 August 1915 – 10 December 1982) was an Australian stock broker, businessman and philanthropist who from 1970 until his death was President of the Board Royal Alexandra Hospital for Children. With Lorimer Dods and John Fulton he co-founded the Children's Medical Research Foundation of which from 1970 he became the Chairman of the Management Committee.

== Early life ==
Burrows was born in Sydney, the son of Rita (née Squire) and Harry Irving Burrows. He was educated at Newington College (1932–1934) and rowed in the 1st IV at the GPS Head of the River in 1933 and 1934. In 1934 he was stroke of the crew. Burrows was Captain of 1st Rifle Shooting Team in 1934. Under his captaincy, the team were GPS Premiers that year and won the Earl Roberts Trophy.

== Working life ==
Upon finishing school, Burrows gained employment with the chartered accounting firm Priestley & Morris. He stayed with the firm until the beginning of World War II and at war's end rejoined them briefly before joining A J Dawson as an Accountant. In 1951, Burrows became a Member of the Sydney Stock Exchange as a partner of Ernest L Davis & Co. He later served as a director of A J Dawson Ltd, and as Deputy Chairman of Edward Lumley Ltd, Security Life Assurance Ltd and Security & General Insurance Company Ltd.

== War service ==
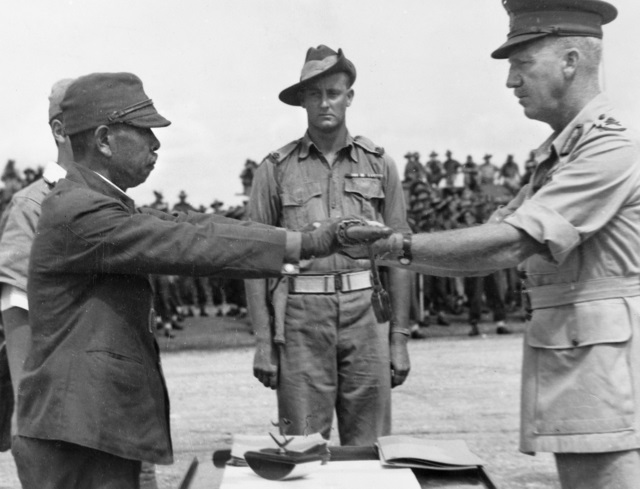
Lt Gen Hatazō Adachi surrenders his sword to Maj Gen Horace Robertson as Major Douglas Burrows stands at attention in the middle

In 1939, Burrows enlisted in the Australian Army and travelled with the first group of enlisted men on the first boat to leave after the beginning of the war. He served in North Africa, Greece and eventually in New Guinea on the Kokoda Track. As Major Douglas Burrows, he became Deputy Assistant Adjutant General of the Australian 6th Division. In that role he was responsible for co-ordinating the ceremony for the signing of surrender documents by Lieutenant General Hatazō Adachi, Commander of the Japanese 18th Army in New Guinea. After signing the unconditional surrender, Adachi presented his sword to the General Officer Commanding, 6th Division, Major General Horace Robertson. Adachi's aide then surrendered his sword to Burrows and this weapon remains with the Burrows family to this day. On 14 February 1946 he was made a Member of the Order of the British Empire in the Military Division for his war service.

== Marriage and family ==
On 15 August 1942, while on a few days army leave, Burrows married Valma Ashcroft who had modelled for advertisements, the Australian Wool Board and women's magazines including covers for The Australian Women's Weekly. They had three children; Mark Douglas Burrows AO; Peter Irving Burrows AO; and Tina Burrows. During their married life, the Burrows were residents of St Ives, New South Wales.

== Children's Hospital ==
In 1952, Burrows joined the board of the Royal Alexandra Hospital for Children. He served as Treasurer (1959–66) and Vice-President (1966–70) before becoming President and serving in that role for eleven years. His wife, Valma, was also appointed to the board in 1973. Valma Burrows' brother-in-law was Dr Sandy Robertson AM a paediatric surgeon at the Children's Hospital.

== Honours ==
Burrows was made a Commander of the Order of the British Empire (Civil) on 16 June 1979 in recognition of his services to children's health. The University of Sydney Medical School Foundation's Douglas Burrows Chair of Paediatrics and Child Health was established in 1983 in his honour.
