= John Basten =

Australian judge

The Honourable John Basten AO KC

Judge of the New South Wales Court of Appeal
- In office 2 May 2005 – 15 April 2022

Personal details
- Born: 16 April 1947 (age 79)
- Relations: Antony Basten (brother)
- Parent: Henry Basten (father)
- Occupation: Lawyer; jurist

John Basten (born 1947) is a former judge of the Court of Appeal of the Supreme Court of New South Wales who served from 2 May 2005 to 15 April 2022. Although no longer a judge of appeal and having reached the mandatory judicial retirement age of 75, he continues to work as an Acting Judge of Appeal of the Supreme Court of New South Wales.

== Education ==
Basten graduated in law, with first class honours, from the University of Adelaide. He subsequently attained a Bachelor of Civil Law degree from the University of Oxford.

== Career ==
From 1996-99, Basten served as a part-time commissioner of the New South Wales Law Reform Commission. He was a member of the New South Wales Pay Equity Taskforce from 1996 to 1997, part-time commissioner of the Australian Law Reform Commission from 1986 to 1987, a lecturer in law at the University of New South Wales from 1974 to 1982, and a Bigelow Teaching Fellow at the University of Chicago from 1972 to 1973. He has also served as part-time Hearing Commissioner of the Human Rights and Equal Opportunity Commission from 1994 to 1997.

In 1992, Basten was appointed Queen's Counsel. He was appointed a Judge of Appeal of the New South Wales Court of Appeal in 2005. Basten was the senior puisne judge of appeal from the retirement of Justice Ruth McColl in 2019 until his own retirement in April 2022. Since April 2022, he has worked as an Acting Judge of Appeal within the NSW Court of Appeal, a position he is permitted to hold until April 2025.

In 2022, Basten was presented with an Honorary Doctorate in Law by the University of New South Wales. In September 2024, Basten was presented with an Honorary Doctorate in Law by the University of Adelaide "for his work as a scholar, advocate and judge".

Basten was appointed Officer of the Order of Australia in the 2025 Australia Day Honours "for distinguished service to the law as a judge, to legal education, to board and commission roles, and as a champion of Indigenous and human rights".
