= The Children's Hospital at Westmead =

- Sydney Children's Hospital Network
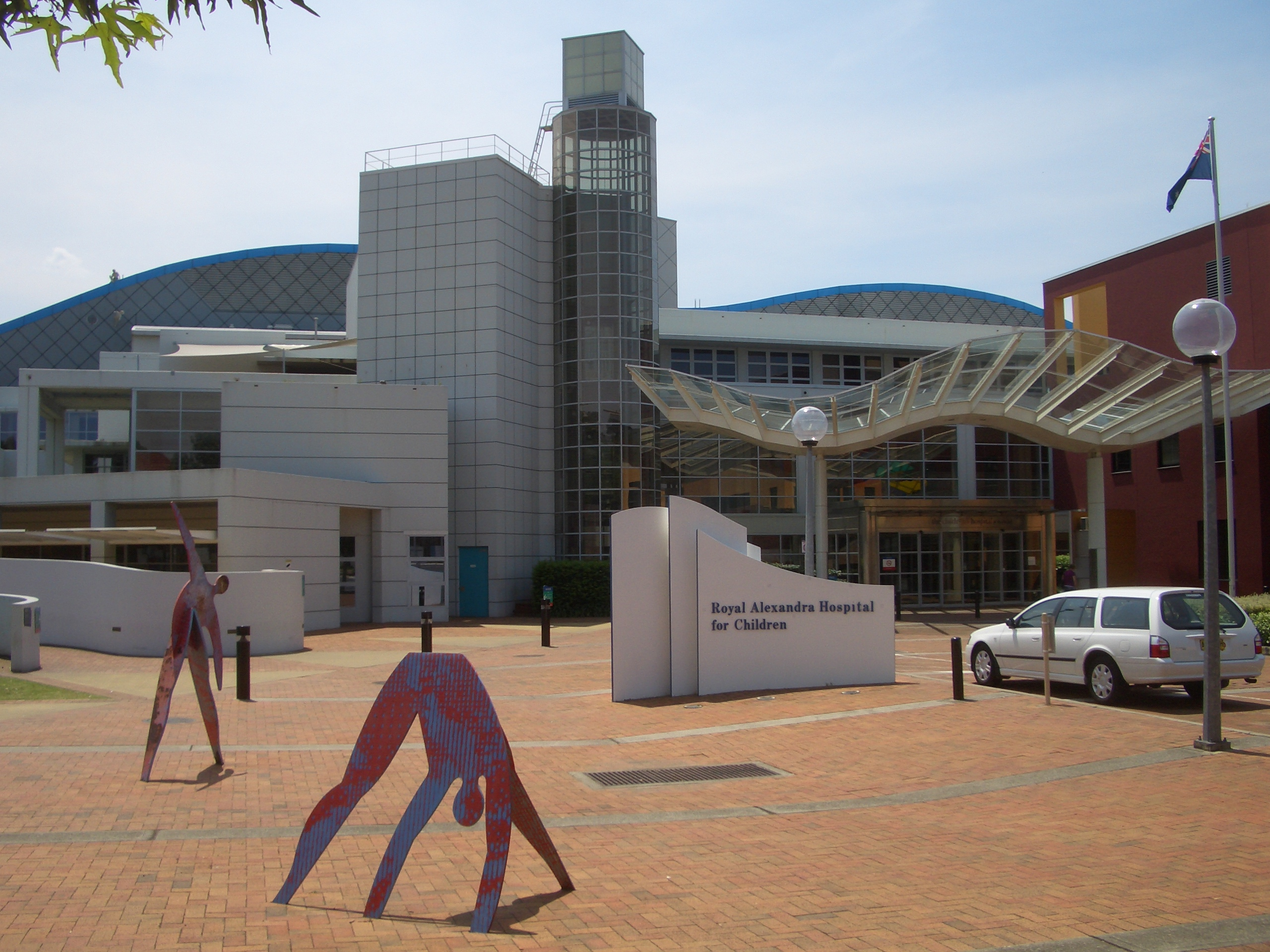
- Hospital entrance

Geography
- Location: Cnr Hawkesbury Rd & Hainsworth St, Westmead, New South Wales, Australia
- Coordinates: 33.8017°S 150.992°E

Organisation
- Care system: Medicare (Australia)
- Type: Teaching
- Affiliated university: University of Sydney
- Network: NSW Health

Services
- Emergency department: Yes: Pediatric Major Trauma Centre
- Beds: 340
- Speciality: Pediatrics and pediatric subspecialties

Helipads
- Helipad: (ICAO: YXWM)
Number	Length		Surface
Number	ft	m	Surface
1			aluminium

History
- Founded: 1880

Links
- Website: Official website
- Lists: Hospitals in Australia

The Children's Hospital at Westmead (CHW; formerly Royal Alexandra Hospital for Children) is a children's hospital in Western Sydney. The hospital was founded in 1880 as "The Sydney Hospital for Sick Children". Its name was changed to the "Royal Alexandra Hospital for Children" on 4 January 1904 when King Edward VII granted use of the appellation 'Royal' and his consort, Queen Alexandra, consented to the use of her name.

The Children's Hospital at Westmead is one of three children's hospitals in New South Wales. It is currently located on Hawkesbury Road in Westmead and is affiliated with the University of Sydney.

On 1 July 2010, The Children's Hospital at Westmead became part of the newly formed The Sydney Children's Hospitals Network (Randwick and Westmead), incorporating the Royal Alexandra Hospital for Children.

== History ==
=== Foundation as the Sydney Hospital for Sick Children ===
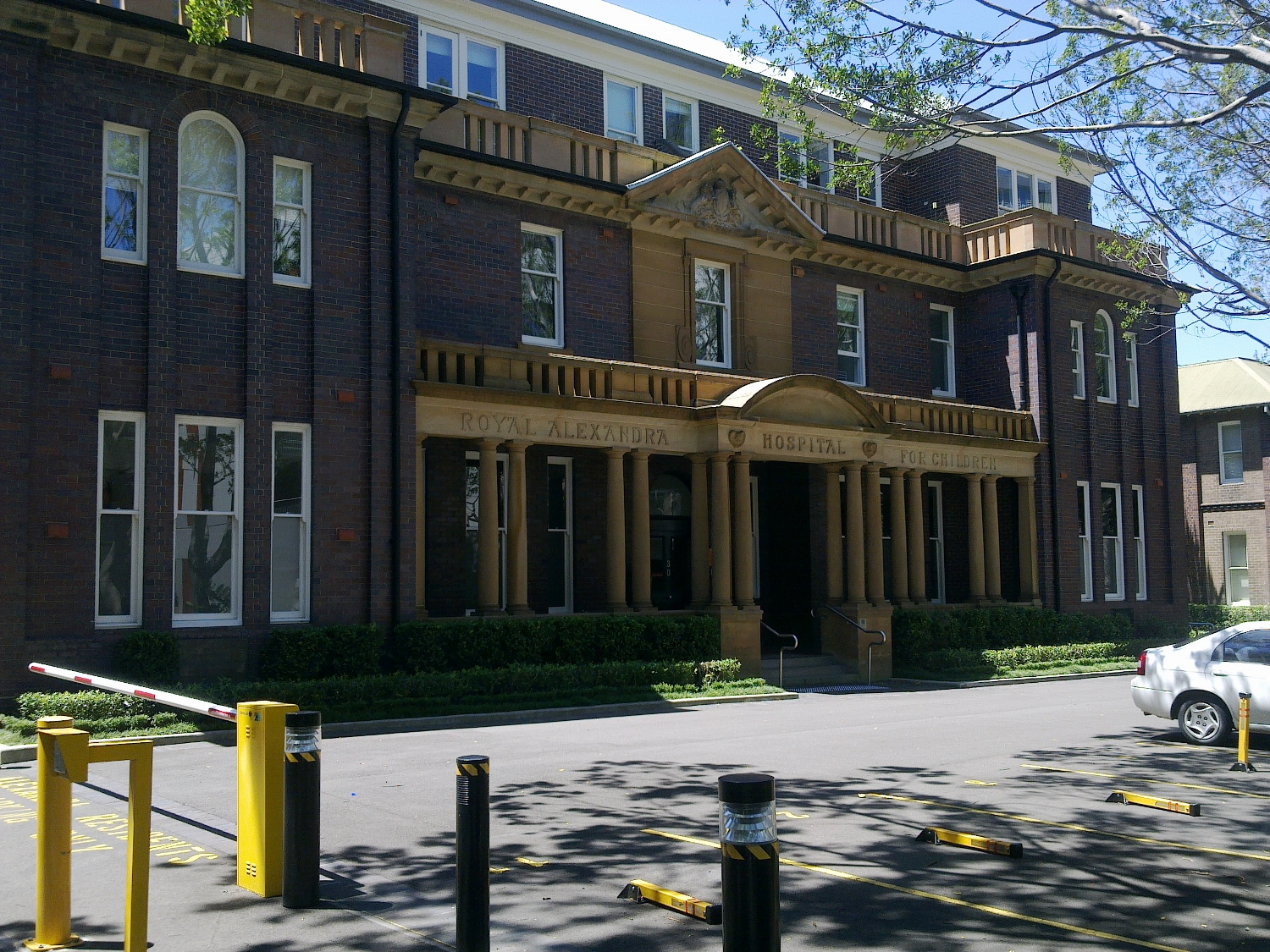
RAHC Camperdown

The hospital was opened in 1880 as the Sydney Hospital for Sick Children. In 1878, Jessie Campbell-Browne, wife of the Member for Singleton, had gathered a group of women to discuss the merits of establishing a children's hospital in Sydney; the outcome of Campbell-Browne's overtures was the new hospital. It soon outgrew the small building in which it was housed at Glebe Point. In 1906, it moved to a much grander building, designed by Harry Kent in Camperdown, where it stayed for 89 years, where it was known as the Camperdown Children's Hospital.

=== Relocation and renaming ===
In 1995, the hospital was relocated to its current location in Westmead to better serve the growing populations of Western Sydney. This relocation involved amalgamation with most of the paediatric services of nearby Westmead Hospital (apart from neonates) to form a new hospital with a new name, initially "The New Children's Hospital" and, more recently, "The Children's Hospital at Westmead".

The official name of the Children's Hospital at Westmead, the "Royal Alexandra Hospital for Children", is retained.

== Services ==
The Children's Hospital at Westmead is one of the busiest Children's Hospitals in New South Wales seeing over 80,000 patients annually. In addition to the emergency department, outpatient clinics and inpatient departments receive patients by general practitioner and specialist referral.

=== Adolescent health ===
The Adolescent Medicine at The Children's Hospital at Westmead seeks to improve the health and wellbeing of young people aged 12–24. The key focus areas include developing information and resources; capacity building to increase workers' skills and confidence in adolescent health; supporting applied research; advocacy and policy development to increase leadership and action for adolescent health.

== Paediatric transgender care controversy ==
In February 2023, a team of researchers at Westmead led by general paediatrician Dr Joseph Elkadi, psychologist Dr Catherine Chudleigh, and paediatric endocrinologist Dr Ann M. Maguire published an article in the paediatric journal Children examining the developmental pathway and clinical outcomes of 79 transgender children who presented at the hospital's gender service, the conclusions of which are contested. The authors concluded that gender-affirming healthcare is, in effect, "iatrogenic" and a "non-standard risky approach". Their conclusions were widely repeated in numerous articles in conservative or right-leaning media outlets in Australia, citing "legal and safety fears" over gender-affirming healthcare. Commenting on media discussion of the research, an ABC Australia article by Patricia Karvelas, Lesley Robinson and Carla Hildebrandt said that the research was "being weaponised by anti-trans activists and proponents of alternative forms of gender care."

The conclusions reached in Elkadi et al's article presenting their Westmead study were subsequently analysed and strongly disputed by the peak body for transgender healthcare in Australia, the Australian New Zealand Professional Association for Transgender Health (AusPATH). In a response letter dated 1 March 2023, AusPATH held that the Westmead study's authors displayed "significant bias" in their use of terminology and selection of supporting literature. For example, AusPATH found the Westmead article cited "discredited literature"; that it included a preponderance of marginal literature that tended to be critical of the gender-affirming approach, without any balancing consideration of the "well-described, established" body of work demonstrating benefits of the more medically-accepted treatments. AusPATH also identified what, in its view, were a range of methodological flaws and misrepresentations of data in the Westmead study. In particular, its use of the scientifically-unverified "Rapid Onset Gender Dysphoria" (ROGD) classification for study participants compromises the validity of the Westmead research, according to AusPATH. The Westmead study's authors were also criticised for using "de-humanising" anti-trans language and for "pathologising" gender diversity in a discriminatory way in their article.

In July 2023, the Health Minister for New South Wales, Ryan Park, announced the government would commission a state-wide review of gender-affirming care, to be undertaken by the health policy group the Sax Institute. The review was initiated following a "string of staff resignations", which ABC News, Australia said were linked to the disputed research; the ABC characterised the research as "endorsed by the hospital hierarchy".

== Transport ==
The Children's Hospital at Westmead has a light rail stop, served by the L4 Westmead & Carlingford line operated by Sydney Light Rail. The stop opened on 20 December 2024.

== Notable people ==
=== Notable staff and board members ===
Some notable individuals connected to the history of the Children's Hospital are:

- Sir Lorimer Dods LVO (1900–1981), paediatrician who founded, with assistance from Dr John G. Fulton and Douglas Burrows, the Children's Medical Research Foundation.
- Sir Charles Clubbe (1854–1932), was the President of the hospital's Board of Management from 1904 until 1932, can perhaps be called the father of the Children's Hospital and is sometimes also mentioned as one of the pioneers of Australian orthopaedic surgery. Clubbe has a ward named after him.
- Sir Robert Blakeway Wade (1874–1954), orthopaedic surgeon. A hospital building completed in 1939, Wade House, was named in his honour; it features pictures of Australian fauna drawn on many walls by artist Pixie O'Harris.
- Dr Margaret Hilda Harper (1879–1964), paediatrician who discovered the difference between coeliac disease and cystic fibrosis of the pancreas in 1930.
- Sir Norman Gregg MC FRACS (1892–1966), ophthalmologist: the first person to identify German measles as a cause for congenital deformities.
- Rosa Angela Kirkcaldie CBE (1887–1972), charismatic matron 1922–1945
- Dr Lindsay Dey CBE (1886–1973), paediatrician: President of the hospital's Board of Management from 1946 until 1959.
- Dr Frank Tidswell (1867–1941), microbiologist: Director of Pathology from 1913 until 1941
- Dr. R. Douglas Reye (1912–1977), fellow of the Royal Australasian College of Physicians, after whom Reye's syndrome was named, worked at the hospital from 1939 until his death.
- Dr Marcel Sofer–Schreiber FRACS FRCS MRCS MBBS Sydney, 1931 (1910–1994), paediatric neurosurgeon, led the way in Australia in the treatment of hydrocephalus, using the Spitz–Holter shunt in the 1960s. He went on to train many doctors to carry out this procedure, thus saving the lives of countless babies, and leaving a lasting legacy. He published extensively on his specialty with papers on hydrocephalus, head injuries and spinal tumours. He was also the first surgeon to draw attention to the potentially deadly condition of subdural haematoma in infants.
- Isobelle Mary Ferguson (1926–2019), Aboriginal nurse and activist, the first known Aboriginal person to train at the hospital, completing her first year in 1945

=== Notable patient ===
Notable individual connected to the history of the Children's Hospital are:

- Sophie Delezio (born 2001) – treated at the hospital after being badly injured in a car crash at two years old. She suffered burns to 85 per cent of her body but survived and was released from hospital six months later in June 2004.

== See also ==
- List of hospitals in Australia
- Healthcare in Australia
- Sydney Children's Hospital
- Westmead Hospital
