= Australian Society for Microbiology =

Australian learned society for microbiology

- Abbreviation: ASM
- Formation: 1959
- Founder: Nancy Atkinson
- Founded at: Melbourne, Victoria, Australia
- Type: Learned society; professional association
- Legal status: Not-for-profit organisation; registered charity
- Headquarters: Melbourne, Victoria, Australia
- Region served: Australia
- President: Professor Mark Schembri
- Publication: Microbiology Australia
- Website: www.theasm.org.au

The Australian Society for Microbiology (ASM) is an Australian learned society and professional association for microbiologists. It was established in Melbourne in 1959 and developed as a national society with branches in all Australian states. The society describes itself as a not-for-profit organisation devoted to furthering the science of microbiology, with membership approaching 2,000.

The society publishes Microbiology Australia, an open-access journal published by CSIRO Publishing on behalf of the ASM. ASM has also contributed to professional standards and science-policy discussions in Australia, including microbiological culture collections, bioprospecting, infectious-disease testing quality control and scientific codes of ethics.

== History ==
By the late 1950s, microbiology had become established in Australian universities, but microbiologists generally met through broader scientific forums such as the congresses of the Australian and New Zealand Association for the Advancement of Science. The formation of a national microbiology society is closely associated with Nancy Atkinson, a bacteriologist at the University of Adelaide.

At the 1958 ANZAAS congress in Adelaide, Atkinson convened a meeting of about 50 scientists to discuss establishing a society dedicated to promoting microbiology in Australia, with a branch in every state. McEwin writes that Atkinson argued for a forum focused on current research and exchange of knowledge in microbiology, rather than relying on meetings devoted to science more generally.

Following the meeting, Atkinson, Jack Harris of CSIRO and Lance Walters of the South Australian Brewing Company were appointed to draft a constitution. The inaugural meeting of the Australian Society for Microbiology was held in May 1959 at University Women's College, University of Melbourne. Sydney D. Rubbo chaired the meeting, and Sir Macfarlane Burnet became the foundation president.

Atkinson served as the society's first honorary treasurer from 1959 to 1962, was president from 1962 to 1964, and was later made an honorary life member. The society's annual scientific meeting has traditionally been opened with the Nancy Atkinson Bell.

The Encyclopedia of Australian Science and Innovation records ASM as a corporate body established in 1959 in Melbourne. In 2002, it had approximately 3,200 members and branches in all Australian states. The society's current website states that its membership approaches 2,000.

== Organisation and membership ==
The ASM is a not-for-profit organisation formed in 1959 as a learned society devoted to furthering the science of microbiology. It became an incorporated professional society in 1976. The society is organised through a council and governance structure, with committees that include special interest groups, state branches, and standing committees.

Membership categories include student, associate, retired, reduced-employment, professional, fellow and sustaining membership.

Professional membership, using the post-nominal MASM, is available to microbiologists whose experience and formal qualifications are assessed by the society as consistent with a professional level of commitment to microbiology. The society's criteria include degree-level or postgraduate qualifications in microbiology and at least 2 years of postgraduate work that contributes to the discipline.

Fellowship, using the post-nominal FASM, is the society's highest professional qualification. Fellows are assessed as either specialists in their field or scientists who have made a significant contribution to the profession. Eligibility requires current professional membership and at least 10 years of work experience advancing microbiology.

The Australian Business Register lists The Australian Society for Microbiology Incorporated as an active incorporated entity with ABN 24 065 463 274. It has been registered with the Australian Charities and Not-for-profits Commission since 3 December 2012.

== Activities ==
The ASM supports the exchange of microbiological knowledge through publications, lectures, seminars, symposia, demonstrations and professional standards for microbiology practice. Science & Technology Australia describes the society as promoting public awareness of microbiology and liaising with governments and professional bodies at state and federal levels.

The society also holds national and branch meetings, including the ASM Annual National Meeting, and supports specialist conferences and events in areas of microbiology.

== Publications ==
The society's journal is Microbiology Australia. The journal is published by CSIRO Publishing on behalf of the ASM. The Directory of Open Access Journals lists Microbiology Australia as a peer-reviewed open-access journal with print ISSN 1324-4272 and online ISSN 2201-9189, covering topics including microbiology, viruses, infectious diseases, zoonoses and epidemiology.

== Public and professional role ==
ASM has contributed to professional and policy discussions involving microbiology in Australia. In a 2001 House of Representatives report on bioprospecting, evidence from ASM was cited regarding the condition of Australian microbial culture collections, the need for a national repository of organisms, and access and ownership issues affecting microorganisms and biological resources.

In laboratory standards, the National Association of Testing Authorities reported in 2024 that ASM and the National Serology Reference Laboratory had developed guidelines on the use of quality controls for serology and nucleic acid tests used in infectious disease testing.

== Awards ==
The ASM presents awards recognising microbiology research, diagnostic microbiology, teaching, service, communication, student achievement and early-career achievement. National awards include the Frank Fenner Award, Lyn Gilbert Award, Jim Pittard Early Career Award, David White Excellence in Teaching Award, Cheryl Power Early Career Microbiology Educator Award, Distinguished Service Award, Honorary Life Membership Award, Industry Engagement Award and Communications Award.

The society also offers travel and development awards, including the Student and Early Career Researcher International Travel Award, Nancy Millis Student Travel Awards, Summer Student Research Award, Clinical Microbiology Travel Award, Teacher's Travel Award, USA Teacher's Travel Award and Dena Lyras Early Career Researcher Awards.

== Presidents ==
The following table lists current and past presidents of the Australian Society for Microbiology.

Term	President
2022–	Professor Mark Schembri
2018–2022	Professor Dena Lyras
2016–2018	Professor Roy Robins-Browne
2014–2016	Professor Jon Iredell
2012–2014	Professor Paul Young
2010–2012	Professor John Turnidge
2008–2010	Professor Hatch Stokes
2006–2008	Associate Professor Keryn Christiansen
2004–2006	Professor Julian Rood
2002–2004	Professor David Ellis
2000–2002	Professor Gwendolyn Gilbert
1998–2000	Professor Ian Gust AO
1996–1998	Professor John Finlay-Jones
1994–1996	Dr Derk Groot-Obbink
1992–1994	Professor John Mackenzie
1990–1992	Professor Kerry Cox
1988–1990	Professor David White AO
1986–1988	Professor Anthony Wicken
1984–1986	Professor Barrie Marmion
1982–1984	Dr Gordon Rich
1981–1982	Professor Kevin Marshall
1978–1981	Professor Nancy Millis
1976–1978	Dr Eric French
1975–1976	Dr Peter Cooper
1974–1975	Dr Allan Ferris
1973–1975	Professor Ralph Doherty
1972–1973	Professor John Thonard
1971–1972	Dr John Christian
1970–1971	Dr Geoffrey Cooper
1969–1970	Professor Solomon Faine
1968–1969	Professor Neville Stanley
1967–1968	Professor James Vincent
1965–1967	Professor Victor Skerman
1964–1965	Professor Frank Fenner
1962–1964	Dr Nancy Atkinson
1961–1962	Dr Ian Mackerras
1960–1961	Professor Sydney Rubbo
1959–1960	Sir Frank Macfarlane Burnet

== See also ==
- Science and technology in Australia
- Australian and New Zealand Association for the Advancement of Science
