= Essington, Westmead =

Essington
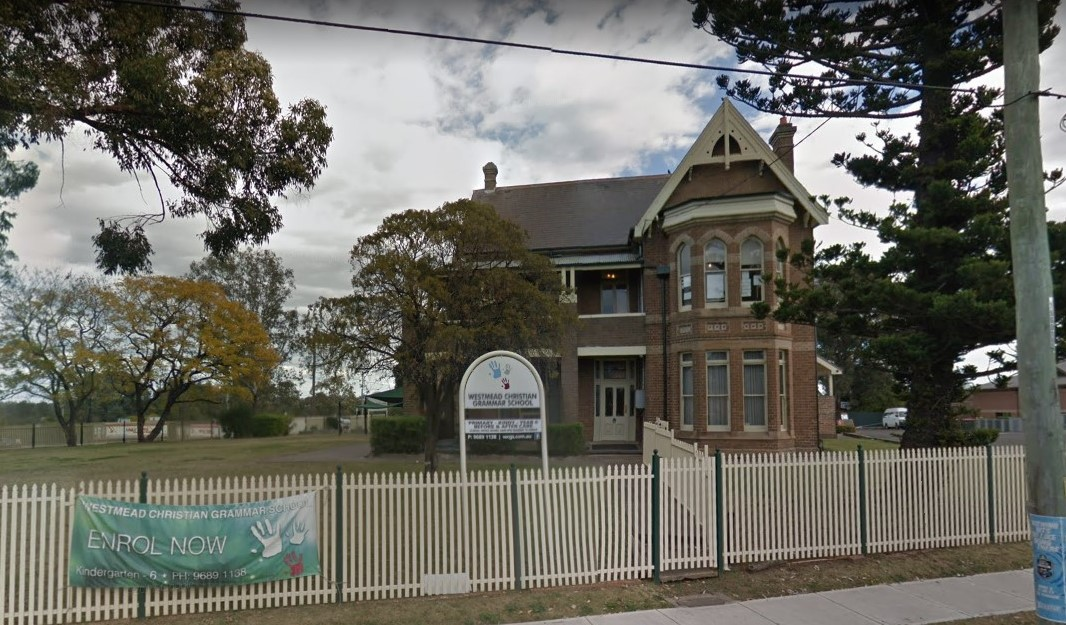

- Location within Sydney Location within Australia
- 33°49′00″S 150°58′50″E
- Location: 2, 4, 6, 8 Bridge Road, Westmead, Cumberland Council, New South Wales, Australia

History
- Built: 1860–1890

Site notes
- Owner: Church of the Foursquare Gospel

New South Wales Heritage Register
- Official name: Essington; Essington Christian Centre; Essington Christian Academy
- Type: State heritage (complex / group)
- Designated: 2 April 1999
- Reference no.: 204
- Type: House
- Category: Residential buildings (private)

Westmead Christian Grammar School
- 2–14 Bridge Road, Westmead, New South Wales; Australia

Information
- Other name: Essington Christian Academy
- Type: Private primary school
- Motto: To grow in wisdom and stature and in favour with God and man
- Religious affiliation: Christianity
- Denomination: Non-denominational
- Established: 19 March 1983; 43 years ago
- Founder: Church of the Foursquare Gospel
- Authority: NSW Department of Education
- Staff: 8.8 FTE
- Years: K–6
- Enrolment: 134 (2020)
- Website: www.wcgs.com.au

Essington is a heritage-listed former gentleman's residence and farm estate on Bridge Road, in Westmead, New South Wales, a suburb of Sydney, Australia. It was built from 1860 to 1890. It is also known as Essington Christian Centre; Westmead Christian Grammar School. The property is owned by Church of the Foursquare Gospel and operates as an independent school. It was added to the New South Wales State Heritage Register on 2 April 1999.

== History ==
Essington was built for one of Holroyd's important pioneers, William Fullagar as his second, residence, opposite his first, (The Wattles or Wattle Cottage) as a gentleman's villa on the northern side of the Great Western Highway in a prominent position. Reportedly it was designed and decorated with no expense spared.

Fullagar was the son of convicts John Fulligar and Esther Leadham, and he demonstrates the upward mobility of descendants of many individuals transported to NSW. Fullagar was a butcher and publican turned stock agent who was in the process of buying large tracts of neighbouring properties and making his way up in the world. From his base at The Wattles or Wattle Cottage, he bought sufficient land to make him one of Holroyd's important pioneers whose estates covered much of Wentworthville.

William Fullagar purchased the 12-hectare (30-acre) James grant, to the south of the present Essington, in 1849, and "soon after he purchased it, he fenced it and built his residence upon it and went there to live, and lived there continuously from that time until within a few years of his death". When he bought James's 30 acres, Fullagar was the lessee of the neighbouring Burder Park estate (later Finlayson's Estate) a 38-hectare (95-acre) property immediately west of James's grant belonging to descendants of Rowland Hassall, William Davis and John Bolger – these are all marked on a 1908 map of the Parish of St. John. He then purchased land from the Burder Park estate in 2 lots of 27.22 hectares (67.25 acres) in 1851 and 1854, the last section of 13 hectares (33 acres) on the south-west corner was not acquired until 1866. He used the property as part of his business for cattle grazing and in later years, agistment as well as growing hay and other feed crops, timber cutting, making bricks and cultivating part of it as an orchard.

All statements agreed that once he moved to Willow Cottage, Fullagar never lived anywhere else until he built his new residence opposite the 81-hectare (201-acre) property 'some few years before he died in 1894.

By the 1870s Fullagar was one of the major landholders in the Parramatta district. The lots he acquired in 1859–61 were during the sale of an extensive portion of the NSW Government Domain (by the 1850s 'Parramatta Park'). In fact Fullagar owned much of present-day Wentworthville.

Although continuing his stock auction activities, Fullagar aspired to the status of a gentleman. He had time to pursue the hounds in fox hunts organised apparently under his patronage. He was reputedly a crack rider whose long riding stick is clearly visible in a portrait. He was also, for a time, one of the trustees of Parramatta Park. Fullagar's Paddock was occasionally used by others, e.g.: cadets from Sydney Grammar School and The King's School combined for an encampment there on the Queen's Birthday, 22 May 1875.

The date he moved over the road to his new house Essington is vague from the existing records. This move appears to have occurred in the late 1880s as his wife, Sarah Fullagar, died at Essington on 24 March 1889. At the time of the 1891 census there were two males and five females at Essington. William Fullagar died there on 8 August 1894, a week after signing his last will and testament. The will offers a convenient summary of his property: it required the sale of three parcels of land – the 81-hectare (201-acre) site of his former residence, Willow Cottage; 16 hectares (40 acres) adjoining Bailey's Orchard near Parramatta north of the railway line; and the site of Essington together with neighbouring allotments, the extensive holdings purchased from Parramatta Park. After costs the money was to be distributed, first in defined bequests – to William Fullagar the younger, to married daughters Hannah Barnes and Sarah Houison, to his grandson Thomas Barnes and to Adah Rebecca Harrex, (Sarah's cousin and possibly the family retainer). Any balance of the sale was to be divided equally between the 8 surviving children from his second marriage – five daughters and three sons.

The first attempt to sell any land from the estate occurred shortly after probate was granted when Fullagar's Paddocks were subdivided and auctioned on 9 February 1895. It appears this auction was unsuccessful. Another was held on 25 September 1897, again without provoking much interest, for the only buyer was a family member, Amy Adah Hughes, so the trustees decided to apply for Torrens Title, possibly to encourage sales.

Holroyd Heritage Study 1993 notes that Essington was built by a family member, William John Fullagar and sold by him in 1912. Surrounding land "the Fullagar Estate" was further subdivided from c. 1920.

In c. the 1920s, the verandah on the house was replaced.

The Four Square Gospel Church, Parramatta bought the property c. 1980 and erected the subject picket fence in 1982. From 1983 the Church has run a primary school on site. The Church has acquired neighbouring houses with a view to expansion.

== Description ==
Garden

The house is surrounded to the east and south by lawns and mature plantings of trees. A limited number of trees including a large remnant bunya pine (Araucaria bidwillii), hoop pine (A.cunninghamii) and vestiges of its original garden remain on the property, principally on its southern side facing the Great Western Highway, and on the eastern side facing Bridge Street. To the north is principally car parking areas over former grounds, and rear extensions for class rooms/ administration.

To the north the site is predominantly bitumen car parking area, accessed off Bridge Road. To the west additions to the house have been made to provide for school classrooms.

House

Essington is a large two-storey historic house now run as a school, by the Church of the Foursquare Gospel. It is located on the north-western corner of Bridge Road and the Great Western Highway, with its principal facades facing these roads. Its site is elevated and in combination with the house's high ceilings and steep roof, this gives it prominence in the local area.

The house's original block - a late Victorian/Federation building with "Italianate" and "Gothic" elements - was L-shaped with gabled roofs finished with timber bargeboards and turned finials. Walls are polychrome brick and the building has a slate roof. A projecting bay window on the front (east) elevation features 2x2 pane double hung sash windows with sandstone sills and heads; first floor windows on the bay feature "four-centred" arch heads.

The original verandah was replaced by later (probably inter-war period) two storey verandah to the front and side (south) elevations with brickwork columns, first floor balustrade and paired "stump" columns. Various additions including single storey block of rendered masonry and a recent two-storey wing of face brickwork with metal framed sliding windows.

A 1990 classroom extension was made on the house's western side. This is accessed by a carpark entered off Bridge Road.

An auditorium is located at the far-northern end of the site, set low and away from the house.

=== Modifications and dates ===
Constructed during the interwar period, the original verandah was replaced by later (probably inter-war period) two storey verandah to the front and side (south) elevations with brickwork columns, first floor balustrade and paired "stump" columns. Various additions including single storey block of rendered masonry and a recent two-storey wing of face brickwork with metal framed sliding windows.

- 1982 – major restoration works including installation of balustrades and railings on staircase, replacing all original timber window sash cords, glass replacement in front door entry replaced with leadlight, sandstone sills replaced in new brick walls on old building, marble fireplaces restored, painting, landscaping.
- 1982 – new picket fence on Bridge Rd. & Great Western Highway, replacing 1920s two-rail Arris fence.
- 1990 – build 4 new classrooms west of house.
- 2003 – dead large Eucalyptus sp. removed from northern side of house.
- 2005 – slate roof conservation work funded by HO.

== Heritage listing ==
As at 26 August 2008, Essington has historic significance primarily through its association with the Fullagers who were one of the prominent families in the early settlement of Holroyd. The site comprises part of the former government domain purchased by William Fullager c .1860 and the residence built by another Family member Willard John Fullager sometime later.

The residence and grounds also provide evidence of the presence and character of the relatively substantial gentlemen's residences erected in the Holroyd area during the 19th and early 20th Century period though its aesthetic significance as a representative example of a particular period and style has been somewhat compromised by later additions and alterations.

Essington was listed on the New South Wales State Heritage Register on 2 April 1999.

== See also ==
- Australian residential architectural styles
- List of schools in New South Wales
