= Westmead, New South Wales =

Westmead
- Suburb
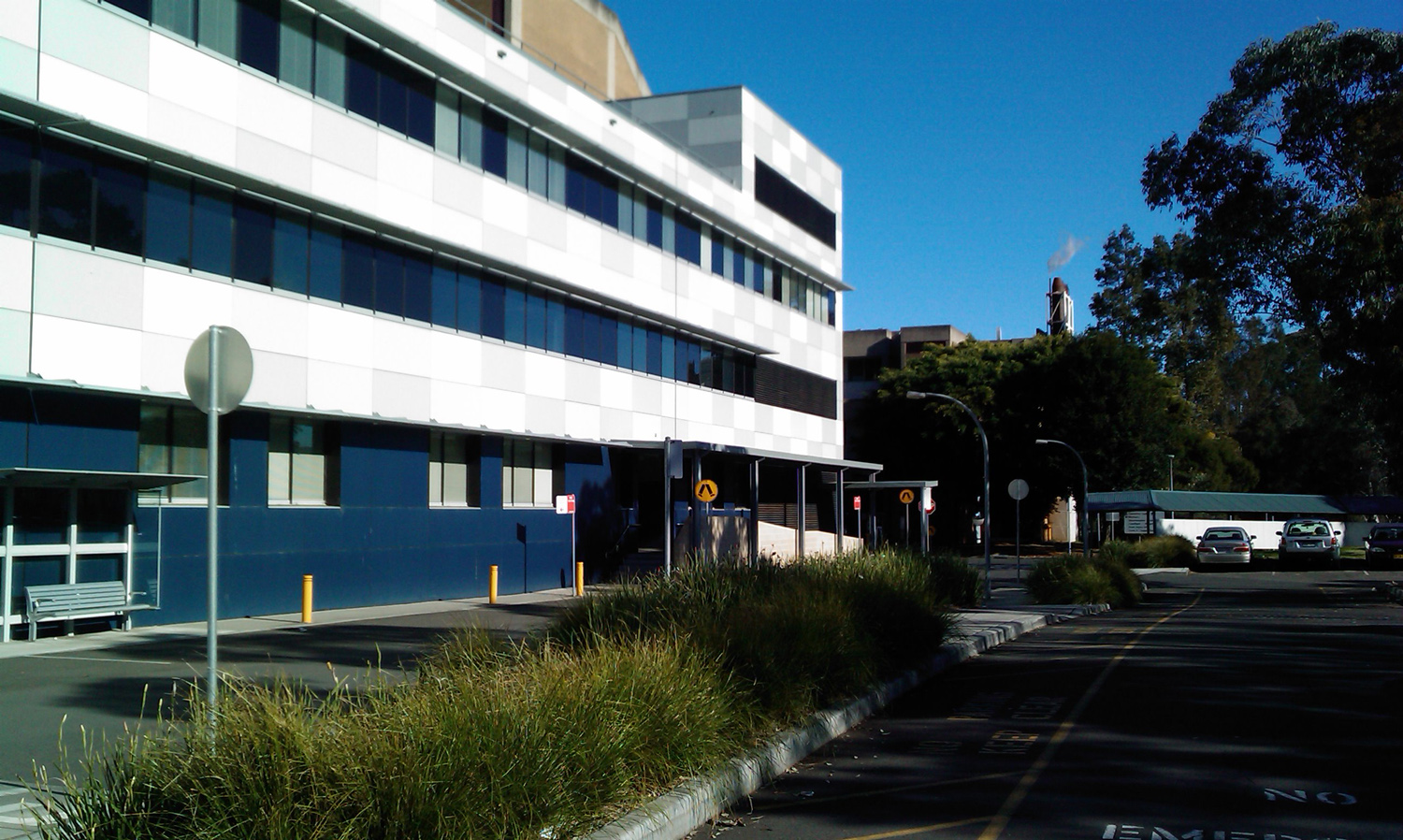
- Westmead Hospital

- Interactive map of Westmead
- Country: Australia
- State: New South Wales
- City: Sydney
- LGAs: Cumberland Council; City of Parramatta
- Location: 26 km (16 mi) west of Sydney

Government
  - State electorates: Parramatta; Granville
  - Federal division: Parramatta

Area
  - Total: 2.9 km^{2} (1.1 sq mi)
- Elevation: 40 m (130 ft)

Population
  - Total: 16,555 (SAL 2021)
- Postcode: 2145
Suburbs around Westmead
Wentworthville	Northmead	North Parramatta
Wentworthville	Westmead	Parramatta
Merrylands West	Mays Hill	Merrylands

Westmead is a suburb in Sydney, in the state of New South Wales, Australia. Westmead is located 26 kilometres west of the Sydney central business district in the local government areas of City of Parramatta and Cumberland Council and is part of the Greater Western Sydney region.

== Geography ==
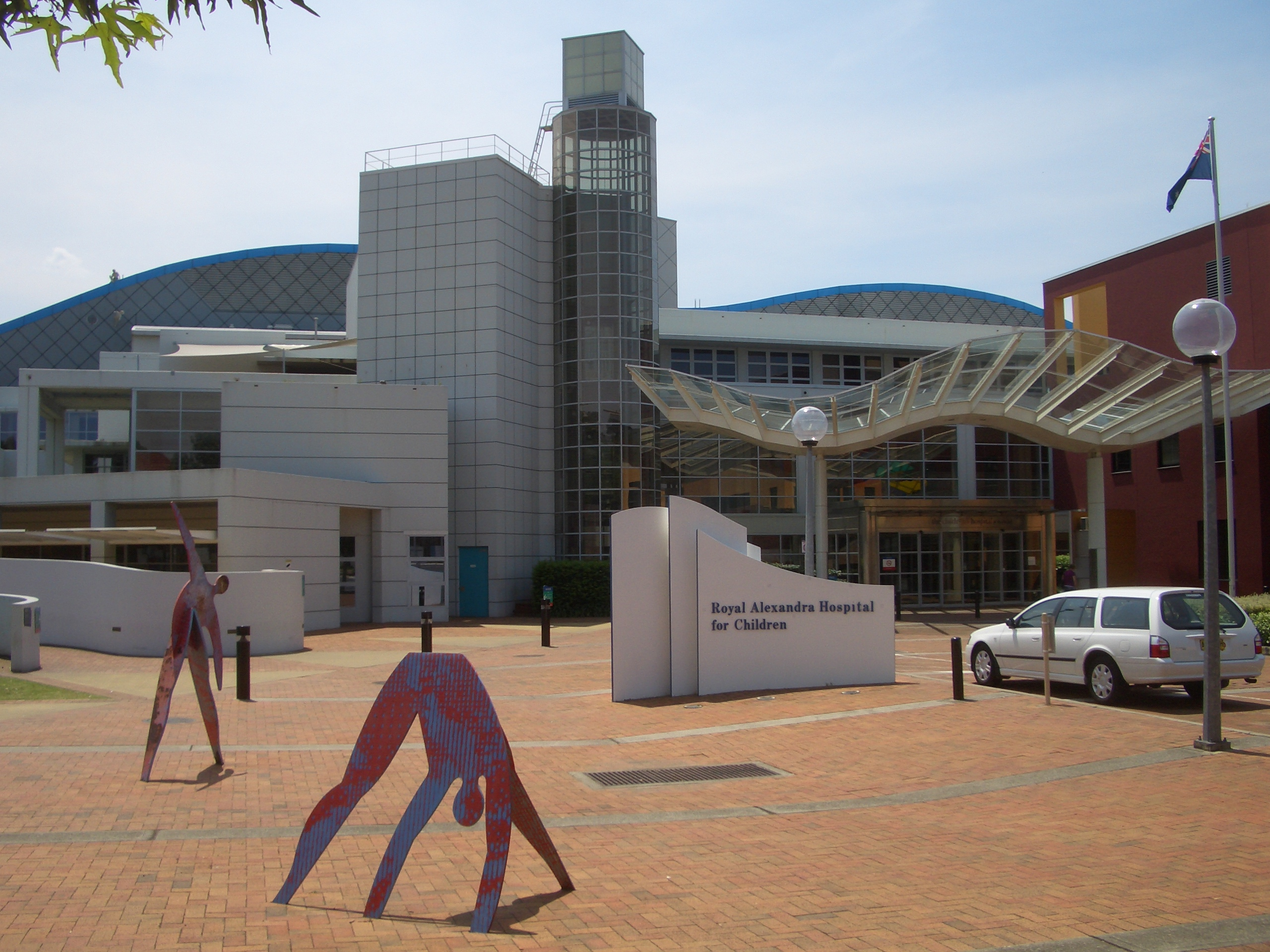
Royal Alexandra Hospital for Children

Westmead is bounded by the Parramatta River, Toongabbie Creek and Finlayson Creek in the north. On the east it is bounded by Parramatta Park, the former location of the Parramatta Golf Club where now the Parramatta Aquatic Centre is located, Amos Street and Good Street. The southern boundary is the Great Western Highway. The western boundary is Bridge Road, the railway line and Finlayson Creek.

== History ==
The Dharug people are the traditional custodians of the land in the area now known as Westmead.

Captain Cook claimed the east coast of Australia for Britain in 1770. The first fleet arrived at Sydney Harbour on 26 January 1788 and a colony was declared on 7 February 1788. An exploration party was led by Governor Arthur Phillip in April 1788 travelling along Parramatta River, deciding on Parramatta as the next town. An outpost was established by November 1788 in Parramatta, which later spread to the nearby area of what is known today as Westmead.

With the British settlement of Parramatta, Westmead was originally part of the domain of Government House. What is left of this domain, including Government House, form Parramatta Park. The name Westmead came into use when the governor's domain was first subdivided in 1859. The subdivision of the domain was completed in 1889. The Northern Meadow and Western Meadow of the domain were split off and called Northmead and Westmead. From this time orchards were established by many new settlers, including some whose names were well known in the Parramatta area – George Oakes, Nat Payten and William Fullagar among them.

Parramatta Marist School was established by Fr. John Therry in Hunter Street Parramatta in 1820, under the direction of Mr. George Morley. The school was transferred to the site of the present junior school in 1837 and entrusted to the care of the Marist Brothers in 1875. This makes Parramatta Marist the oldest Catholic school in Australia.

Westmead railway platform is clearly shown on this map of the “Parish of St John” County of Cumberland in 1902. All of the area from Wentworthville East towards Parramatta is included on the map as part of this shire. This region includes parts of land in the District of Parramatta, Blacktown & Baulkham Hills Shires and forms the major part of the Cumberland LGA. The Wentworthville East and Darcyville estates are not included in this area, most of these estate parts belonging what is now Parramatta LGA.

== Heritage listings ==
Westmead has a number of heritage-listed sites, including:

- 2, 4, 6, and 8 Bridge Road: Essington
- 1 Amos Street: ‘Allengreen’ – Federation Residence
- 15 Austral Avenue: ‘Ruberay’ – Inter-War Bungalow
- 17 Austral Avenue: ‘Warungle’ – Inter-War Bungalow
- 19 Austral Avenue: ‘Chalfont’ – Inter-War Bungalow
- 2 Drew Street: Late Victorian Cottage
- 24 Good Street: ‘The Firs’ – Victorian Gothic Residence
- 43 Hassall Street: Westmead Progress Association Hall

== Health ==
Health is the major employer in the area, with large public hospitals for both adults and children, a mental health hospital, a private hospital and three medical research facilities spanning basic, genetic and molecular science for both adults and children. A community foundation supports fundraising and awareness activities of Westmead.

- CareFlight, an adult medical retrieval service
- Children's Medical Research Institute
- Cumberland Hospital, a psychiatric hospital
- NETS, an intensive care service for neonates
- The Children's Hospital at Westmead (also called the Royal Alexandra Hospital for Children or Sydney Children's Hospital Network, Westmead)
- Westmead Centre for Oral Health
- Westmead Hospital, a major University of Sydney teaching hospital, which was opened in November 1978
- Westmead Medical Research Foundation
- Westmead Millennium Institute for Medical Research
- A new Integrated Mental Health Complex is planned for 2026 opening which will be the largest in NSW. Patients from Cumberland Hospital will be relocated to here.

== Education ==
- The University of Sydney Westmead campus is home to around 2,000 students who are conducting study, research or clinical placements at Westmead, and close to 1,000 staff members and affiliates.
- Western Sydney University (WSU).
- WSU College, Westmead Campus.
- Westmead Public School was established in 1917, when an Infants' School opened in a rented Church of England hall in April of that year. By 1919 the present site was acquired, and the first purpose-built school building was opened in May 1920. In 1923 the building was extended to provide accommodation for Primary students. Within two years the growing local population created demand for additional accommodation for Primary students. At the present day Westmead Public School is one of the best primary schools in NSW, with high academic, sporting and art achievements. It schools over 900 children and has many professional teachers and staff.
- The Catherine McAuley Catholic High School is an all Girls school located on the same campus as Parramatta Marist High School
- Parramatta Marist High School is the oldest Catholic school in Australia, established in 1820.
- Sacred Heart Primary School
- Westmead Christian Grammar School (formerly Essington Christian Academy) was established at the site of Essington House in 1983. It provides a Christian Education for students from Kindergarten through to Year 6.
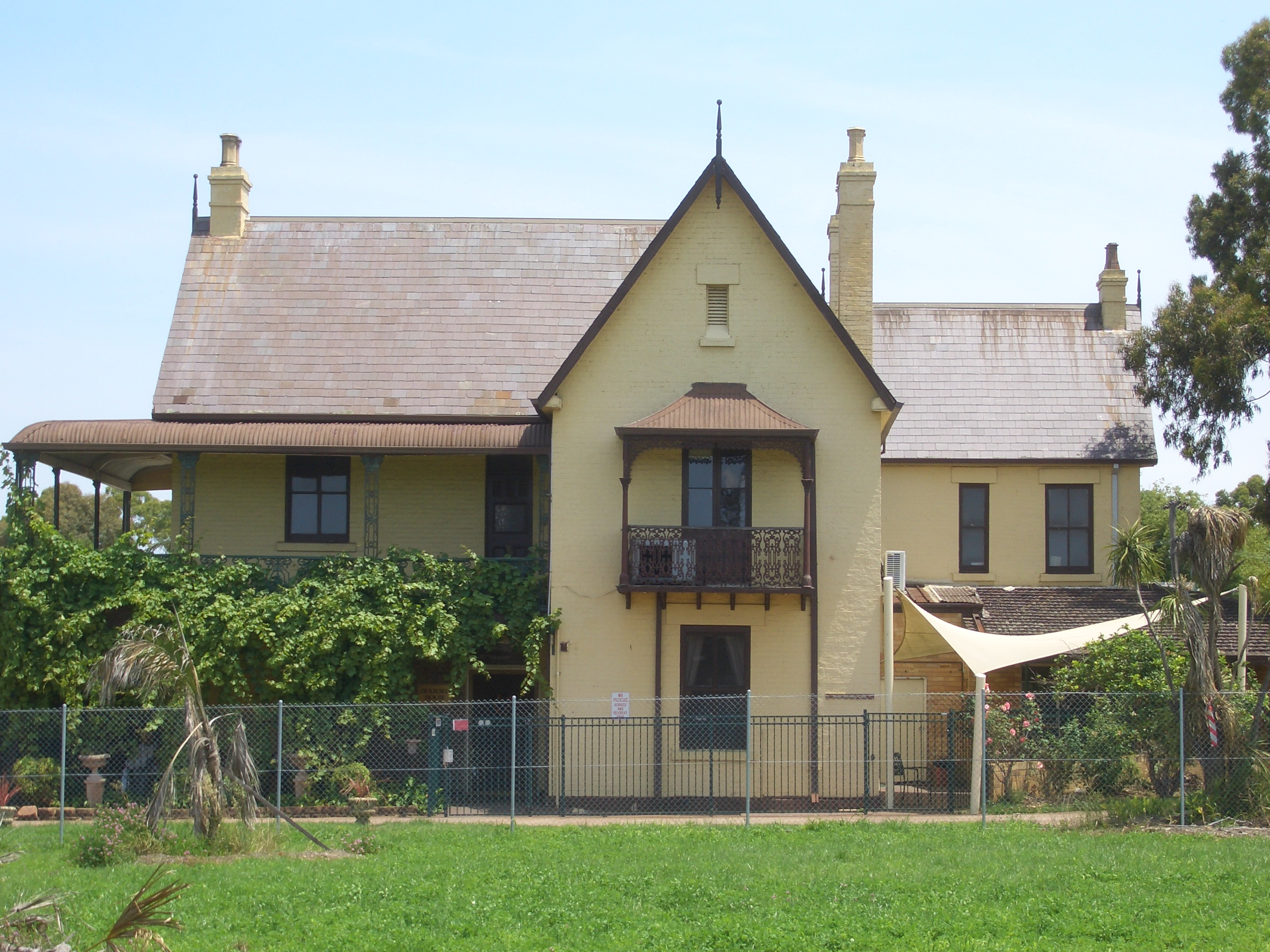
Deskford House

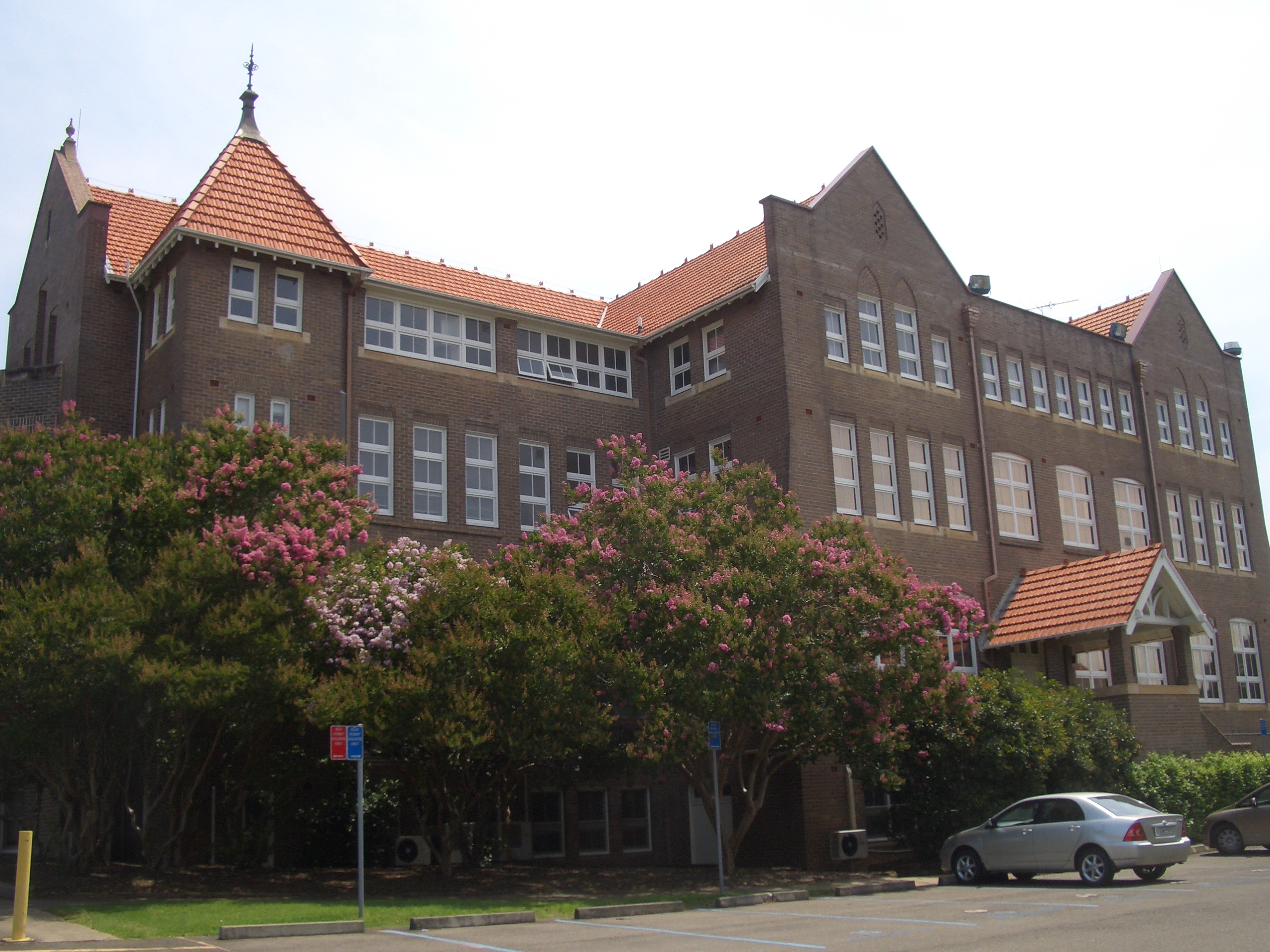
UWS College, Westmead Campus

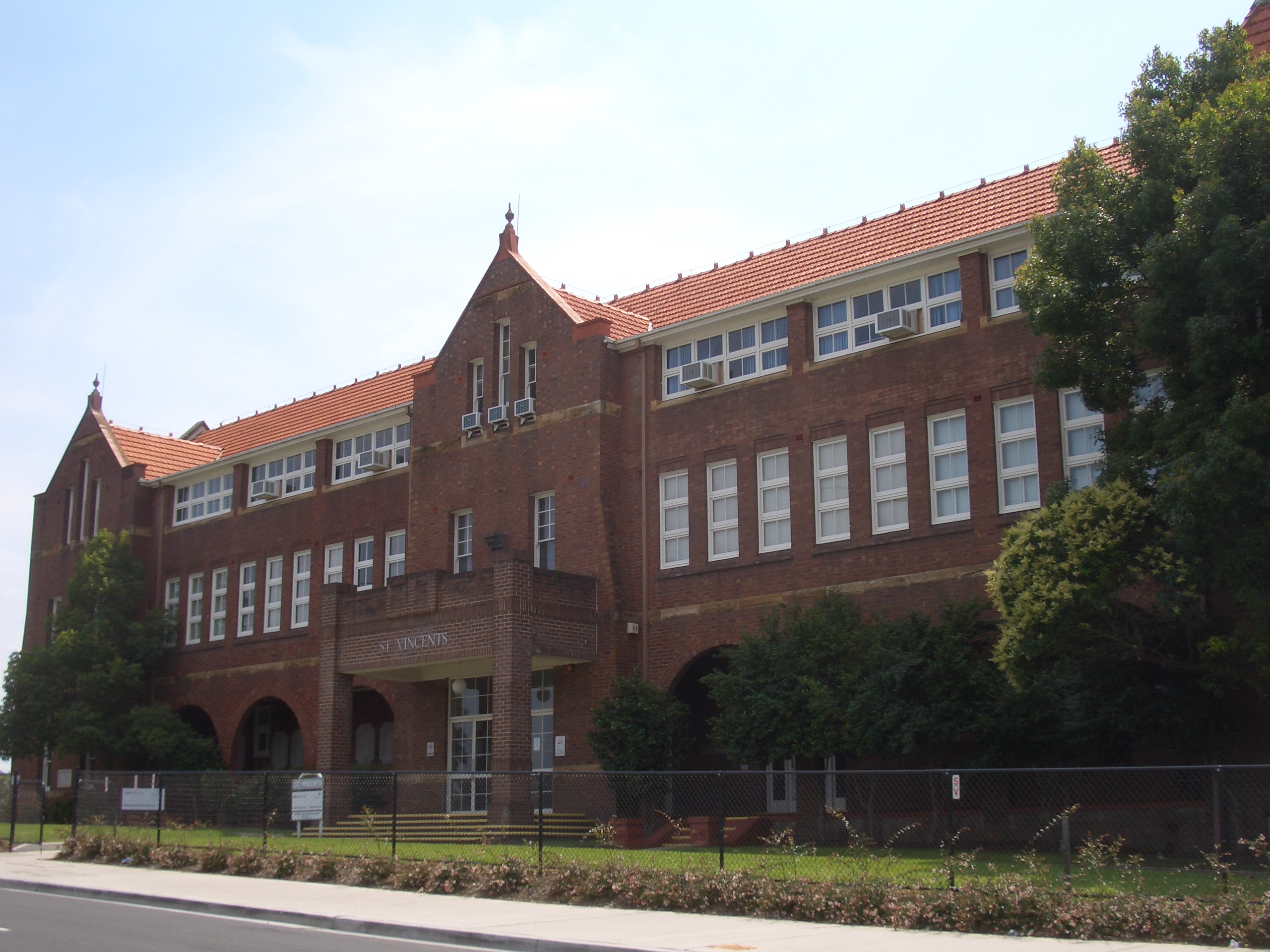
UWS College St Vincents Building

== Transport ==
Westmead railway station is on the T1 North Shore & Western Line, T5 Cumberland Line, and the Blue Mountains Line of the Sydney Trains network. The railway station also operates as the terminus station for the L4 Westmead & Carlingford line of the Sydney Light Rail network, which opened in 20 December 2024. Future Parramatta Light Rail services will operate to Sydney Olympic Park, and future Sydney Metro West services will serve Westmead as the terminus.

The Western railway line from Parramatta to Blacktown was built through the suburb in 1861. A railway station at Westmead was opened in April 1893 after a successful petition by local residents.

A bus transitway, the North-West T-way, services Westmead from both Parramatta and The Hills District.

On the day of the 2016 census, 44.5% of employed people travelled to work on public transport and 40.2% by car (either as driver or as passenger). This is in comparison to the most recent statistics from the 2021 census when New South Wales was under lockdown restrictions during a wave of the COVID-19 pandemic; these statistics are as follows, 11.1% travelled to work via public transport, 26.4% drove to work (either as a driver or passenger) and 45.8% of employed people worked at home.

== Demographics ==
At the 2021 census, the suburb of Westmead recorded a population of 16,555. Of these:

- Age distribution: Residents were notably younger than the country overall. The median age was 33 years, compared to the national median of 38 years. Children aged under 15 years made up 20.9% of the population (the national average was 18.2%) and people aged 65 years and over made up just 8.7% of the population (the national average was 17.2%).
- Ethnic diversity : Just over a quarter (26.1%) of respondents were born in Australia, compared to the national average of 66.9%; the next most common countries of birth were India 38.1%, China (excluding Special Administrative Regions and Taiwan) 3.9%, Nepal 3.4%, Sri Lanka 2.8% and the Philippines 2.2%. At home, 21.6% of residents only spoke English; other languages spoken at home included Hindi 9.8%, Tamil 8.4%, Telugu 6.7%, Gujarati 6.3% and Nepali 3.8%.
- Religion: The most common religious affiliations were Hinduism 43.6%, No Religion 12.8%, Catholic, Islam 7.4%; a further 8.3% of respondents elected not to disclose their religion.
