= Henry Bolton Basten =

British civil servant and university vice-chancellor (1903–1992)

Sir Henry Bolton Basten CMG
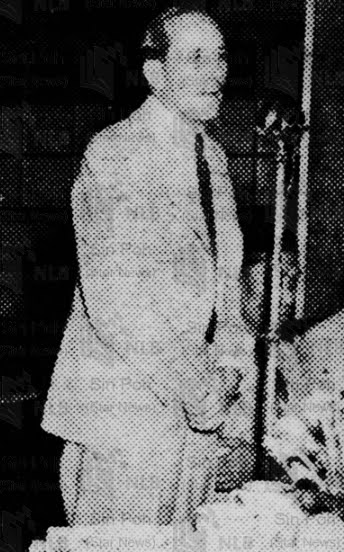
- Basten as Chairman of the Singapore and Penang Harbour Board in 1950
- Born: Henry Bolton Cohen; 2 May 1903; Stoke Newington, London, England, United Kingdom of Great Britain and Ireland (now United Kingdom)
- Died: 8 April 1992 (aged 88); Chatswood, New South Wales, Australia
- Education: Merton College, Oxford
- Occupations: Civil servant and university vice-chancellor
- Children: Antony and John
- Military service
- Allegiance: United Kingdom, Australia
- Service years: 1942–45; 1975–81 (wartime and peacetime civilian defence service under military auspices)
- Units: Ministry of War Transport, Australian Defence Force Academy

Sir Henry Bolton Basten (né Cohen; 2 May 1903 – 8 April 1992) was a British–Australian civil servant and university vice-chancellor.

== Early life and education ==
Basten was born Henry Bolton Cohen on 2 May 1903 at Stoke Newington, London – the eldest son of Gustave Henry Cohen and his wife Elizabeth (née Hawker). He was educated at City of London School and Merton College, Oxford where he received his BA in 1925 (MA in 1954).

== Career ==
Basten joined the colonial civil service and went to India to work for the Calcutta Port Trust. In 1934, he went to Singapore and was employed by the Singapore Harbour Board. Before the Japanese occupation in 1942, he was evacuated to England and served with the Ministry of War Transport, organising shipping. In September 1945, he returned to Singapore as chairman and general manager of the Singapore and Penang Harbour Boards. Having been severely damaged during the Second World War, he successfully rehabilitated the port of Singapore in the face of shortages of materials, frequent labour unrest and crime. For his valuable service he was appointed CMG in 1947. By 1948, with the rebuilding of the docks virtually complete, the goods handled by the Harbour Board reached an all time high.

Basten retired from the civil service in 1950 and left Singapore to work for the Australian government reviewing the operation of Australian ports. In his report he identified the lack of warehouses and congestion at the ports as major causes of the slow turnaround of shipping. His recommendations, including construction of new ports, led to the improvement of port facilities such as those at Port Botany.

In 1952, Basten moved to Adelaide and was employed at University of Adelaide. Initially serving as administrative assistant to Professor A. P. Rowe, the vice-chancellor of the university, he rose to succeed Rowe as vice-chancellor in 1958. While in office, he oversaw an almost doubling in the number of students and academic staff. He made significant contributions to education including founding the Kathleen Lumley College in 1965 and overseeing the establishment of a new campus at Bedford Park (which became the Flinders University in 1966). In 1966 he was knighted. In the following year he received an honorary doctorate from Flinders University.

Basten moved to Canberra in 1967, joined the Australian Universities Commission and succeeded Sir Lenox Hewitt as chairman; serving in the post from 1968 to 1971. He was chairman of the Australian Institute of Marine Science from 1972 to 1977; a member of the planning committee and the interim council of the Australian National Gallery from 1965 to 1971; and chairman of the development council of the Australian Defence Force Academy from 1975 to 1981.

== Personal life and death ==
Basten married Mildred Minshall in St Mary's Cathedral, Calcutta in 1931 and they had two sons; Antony and John. In 1945, he changed his surname from Cohen to Basten—his maternal grandmother's maiden name—to protect his family from anti-Semitism.

Basten died on 8 April 1992, aged 88.

== Honours ==
Basten was appointed Companion of the Order of St Michael and St George (CMG) in the 1947 Birthday Honours. In the 1966 New Year Honours, he was created a Knight Bachelor.
