= Australasian Society of Clinical Immunology and Allergy =

Australasian Society of Clinical Immunology and Allergy (ASCIA)
- Abbreviation: ASCIA
- Formation: 1991
- Type: NGO
- Purpose: humanitarian, research
- Headquarters: Brookvale, New South Wales, Australia
- Region served: Australasia
- Official language: English
- Chief Executive officer: Jill Smith
- Website: https://www.allergy.org.au/

The Australasian Society of Clinical Immunology and Allergy (ASCIA) is a professional organisation of clinical immunologists, allergy specialists, immunology scientists, and other health professionals working in allergy and immunology in Australia and New Zealand. ASCIA is the peak professional body for clinical immunology and allergy in Australia and New Zealand (Australasia).

== Purpose and background ==
ASCIA was formed in 1991 by the merging of the Australian College of Allergy with the Australasian Society of Immunology Clinical Immunology Group.

ASCIA's purpose is to advance the science and practice of allergy and clinical immunology, by promoting the highest standard of medical practice, training, education and research. The aim is to improve the quality of life and health of people with allergic conditions, immune deficiencies and other immune diseases.

== Initiatives and Priorities ==
ASCIA provides a variety of services to its members, creates professional development for health professionals and is involved in collaborations with patient and professional organisations.

Member Services - ASICA makes regular advocacy contributions through submissions to government including letters, submissions and reports. ASCIA also provides online training and education resources for allergy, anaphylaxis and immunodeficiency. ASCIA provides online e-training which was first developed in 2010 to provide ready access to reliable and consistent anaphylaxis education throughout Australia and New Zealand, at no charge, available on the ASCIA website. ASCIA also provides research grants to its members through the Allergy and Immunology Foundation of Australasia (AIFA).

Professional Development - The ASCIA Annual Conference is the main event for allergy and immunology continuing professional development (CPD) in Australia and New Zealand. ASCIA also hosts professional development including Educational Dinner Parties, ASCIA committees and working parties, and online meetings for its associate members (nurses, dietitians and advanced trainees).

Collaborations - The ASCIA Immunodeficiency Strategy is a collaboration between ASCIA, patient support organisations and other stakeholders which was established in 2022. The National Allergy Council is a partnership between ASCIA and Allergy & Anaphylaxis Australia.

== Board of Directors ==
The ASCIA Council for 2024-2026 is chaired by the current ASCIA President, Dr Michael O'Sullivan. The board of directors is also made up of A/Prof Jane Peake (President Elect), Dr Kathryn Patchett and A/Prof Patrick Quinn. ASCIA committee chairs are represented on ASCIA Council. In addition, there are several ASCIA working parties and collaborations as outlined on the ASCIA website.
