= Westmead Institute for Medical Research =

Medical Research institute in New South Wales, Australia

The Westmead Institute for Medical Research
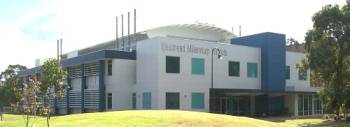
- Motto: Giving hope through science
- Established: 1996
- Research type: Medical research
- Director: Professor Philip O'Connell AO
- Staff: 450
- Students: 120
- Location: 176 Hawkesbury Road, (PO Box 412), Westmead, New South Wales, Westmead, Sydney; 33°48′12″S 150°59′27″E
- Campus: Westmead
- Affiliations: University of Sydney; Westmead Hospital
- Website: westmeadinstitute.org.au

The Westmead Institute for Medical Research is a large medical research institute located at Westmead in the western suburbs of Sydney, Australia. The institute is closely affiliated with Sydney Medical School and Westmead Hospital and comprises approximately 450 medical research and support staff. Originally named the Westmead Millennium Institute for Medical Research, the institute was founded in 1996 through the merging of five research groups at the Westmead health campus, initially comprising just 40 medical researchers, and was renamed on 18 November 2015. The Westmead Institute has grown rapidly on the basis of peer-reviewed funding.

== Organisation ==
Research is organised into five key biological areas:

- Infectious and immune diseases
- Cancer and leukaemia
- Liver and metabolic diseases
- Eye and brain-related disorders
- Heart and respiratory disorders

Professor Tony Cunningham AO has been the executive director of the institute since its inception.

== Affiliations ==
The institute is closely affiliated with the Sydney Medical School at the University of Sydney. As of 20 March 2016, the institute hosted more than 119 higher-degree research students.

== See also ==
- Health in Australia
