= Lorimer Dods =

Australian medical pioneer (1900–1981)

Sir Lorimer Dods LVO
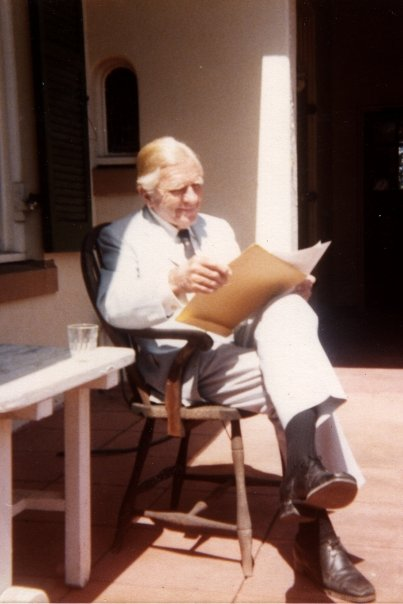
- Dods at Fenton, his home in Edgecliff
- Born: Lorimer Fenton Dods; 7 March 1900; Southport, Queensland, Australia
- Died: 7 March 1981 (aged 81); Edgecliff, New South Wales
- Education: Sydney Church of England Grammar School
- Alma mater: University of Sydney
- Known for: Considered one of Australia's most influential paediatricians
- Scientific career
- Fields: Paediatrics
- Institutions: Children's Medical Research Institute

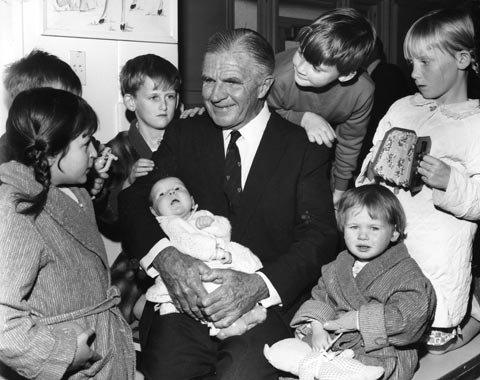

Sir Lorimer Fenton Dods LVO (7 March 1900 – 7 March 1981) was a pioneer of specialised health care for children who founded, with assistance from Dr John Fulton and Douglas Burrows, the Children's Medical Research Foundation (now the Children's Medical Research Institute). He is considered one of Australia's most influential paediatricians.

== Early life and education ==
Lorimer Dods was born on 7 March 1900 in Southport, Queensland, the son of architect Robin Dods and Mary Dods.

In 1914, when he was thirteen, his family moved to Sydney and he was enrolled at Sydney Church of England Grammar School (Shore), where he remained until 1917. After Shore, Dods entered the Faculty of Medicine at the University of Sydney, from which he graduated in 1923.

== Career ==
After graduation, Dods spent a few months in the surgical wards and pathology department of the Royal Prince Alfred Hospital before a one-year appointment as senior resident medical officer at Royal Newcastle Hospital.

In December 1925, at the end of his year's appointment, he sailed on the SS Moreton Bay as the ship's surgeon between London and Sydney. When he returned to Sydney in 1926, he began to work as a general practitioner at 233 New South Head Road, living in a flat behind the surgery.

In 1936, after 11 years, Dods gave up private practice, spending a year working as a child specialist at the Children's Hospital, Birmingham, UK. In 1937 Dods qualified as Fellow of the Royal Australasian College of Physicians (FRACP) and in 1938 became an honorary physician at the Royal Hospital for Women, Paddington.

He joined the 2nd AIF as a medical officer on 12 October 1939, with the rank of captain. He was stationed at the 1st Australian General Hospital in Gaza, Palestine. He returned from the war in late 1945 as a Lieutenant-Colonel. He returned to private practice in 1946, the same year he became personal paediatric physician to then Governor-General of Australia, Prince Henry, Duke of Gloucester, and his two young boys.

== Personal life ==
On 26 February 1927, he married Margaret Kathleen Walsh, the second daughter of Alice and Western Walsh. On 17 November 1927, they had their first child, daughter Rosemary Lorimer Dods. A son, Robert Lorimer Western Dods (known as Robin), was born on 11 August 1930.

On 7 June 1977, his wife died of a cerebral haemorrhage at their Palm Beach house, aged 74.

On 12 February 1981, at his home in Edgecliff, New South Wales, Dods fell and fractured two ribs. He was admitted to St Luke's Hospital where his condition gradually deteriorated. He died on his 81st birthday, 7 March 1981.

== Recognition ==
He was awarded a Carnegie Fellowship in Medicine in 1947. In 1949, the year the Australian Paedriatic Society was founded, he was appointed Australia's first Professor of Child Health.

On 25 February 1947 he was appointed a Lieutenant of the Royal Victorian Order (LVO) for his service as Honorary Physician to the Duke of Gloucester. Dods was knighted by Sir Dallas Brooks on 6 August 1962, having been named a Knight Bachelor in the 1962 New Year's Honours.

In 1967, he was voted Australian Father of the Year. In 1976, he was featured on the Channel 7 TV show 'This Is Your Life'. Five days before he died, a film on his life's work was finished by Tony Culliton and Michael Morton-Evans for Channel 7. His biography Beloved Physician, written by daughter Rosemary, was published in July 1989.

Portraits by Vladas Meskenas and Judy Cassab hang in the Lorimer Dods Lecture Theatre, Westmead and the Children's Medical Research Institute, Westmead respectively.
