= Westmead Medical Research Foundation =

Australian health care organization

Westmead Hospital Foundation
- Founded: 20 November 1990
- Type: Nonprofit organization
- Location: Westmead, New South Wales, Australia
- Coordinates: 33°48′16″S 150°59′19″E
- Region served: Predominately western Sydney
- Key people: Professor Jeremy Chapman OAM (President); Joe Conneely (CEO)
- Revenue: A$3 million (2016)
- Endowment: A$11 million (2016)
- Website: westmeadhf.org.au

The Westmead Hospital Foundation is an Australian not-for-profit organisation which awards grants, provides fundraising support, and community advocacy for health care and medical research at Westmead in the western suburbs of Sydney.

== History ==
Westmead Hospital Foundation, previously known as The Millennium Foundation, My Westmead, and Westmead Medical Research Foundation was established in 1990 to support the care of sick children and adults and hospital-based medical research. Westmead Hospital Foundation is based in Sydney's western suburbs.

A board of directors oversees the operations of the organisation.

A scientific advisory committee oversees grant applications and makes recommendations about the merits of individual applications for funding.

== Funding ==
The organisation grants approximately $3 million per annum across a variety of grant programs.

=== Equipment grants ===
Grants are awarded towards priority projects within Westmead Hospital that enhance services provided by doctors, nurses and allied health workers to patients and their families. Past equipment grants have been awarded to assist in the purchase of cutting-edge technology for the support of critically ill premature babies; an interventional neuroradiology machine as a minimally invasive approach used in diagnosis and treatment of diseases of the head, neck, and spine such as cerebral aneurysms and strokes;

=== Research grants ===
During 2016 the organisation awarded over $600,000 to support specific research projects, such as the transplantation of pancreatic islet cells to treat patients with type 1 diabetes; a study to provide objective biological markers to help in the diagnosis of Attention deficit hyperactivity disorder (ADHD); a study to help understand the role of the ovarian hormones, estrogen and progesterone, that may lead to an increased risk of breast cancer; and a clinical research support program.

=== Service grants ===
Grants are awarded to a variety of programs that provide direct patient benefits; such as a program that provides seriously ill patients and their families some respite from illness, enabling them to take a short vacation, without cost; a brand new bus run by volunteers to offer free transport for patients to and from their residence to local general practitioners or hospitals like Blacktown, Mount Druitt and Westmead; refurbishment of public rooms in the oncology/palliative care ward; and wheelchairs for use by patients within Westmead Hospital.

=== Infrastructure grants ===
The foundation and its donors have also contributed funds to support major infrastructure projects on the Westmead health campus. The Westmead Institute for Medical Research is housed within a newly built, best-practice building that encourages collaboration and is a lynchpin of research in the Westmead precinct. $9m was granted by Westmead Medical Research Foundation to the institute to assist in the construction of this award-winning premises.
