= Nancy Atkinson =

Australian bacteriologist

Nancy Atkinson OBE
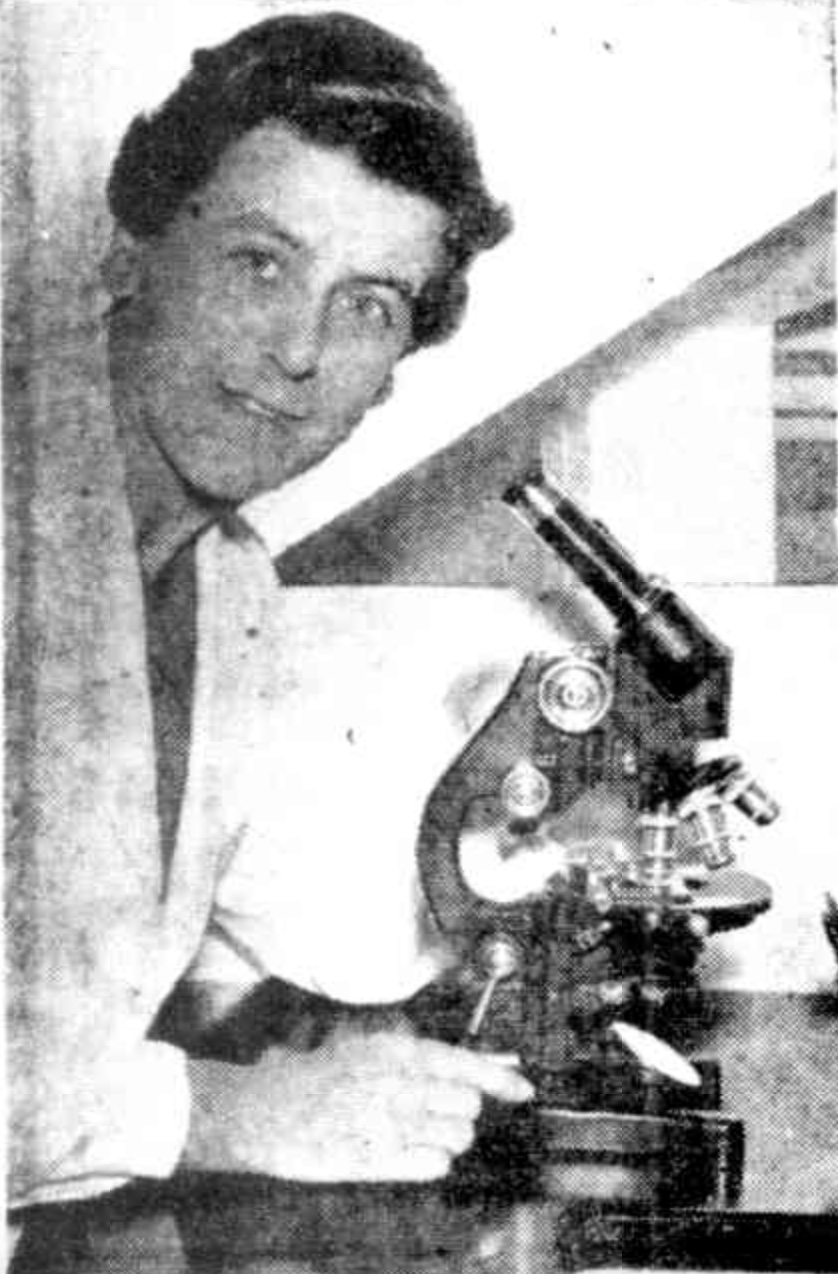
- Atkinson in 1947, from a profile in The Mail of Adelaide
- Born: 9 March 1910; Melbourne, Victoria, Australia
- Died: 21 December 1999 (aged 89); Adelaide, South Australia
- Other names: Nancy Cook; Nancy Benko
- Education: University of Melbourne (B. S., M.S.)
- Awards: Officer of the Order of the British Empire (1951)
- Scientific career
- Fields: Bacteriology
- Workplaces: University of Adelaide; Institute of Medical and Veterinary Science

Nancy Atkinson, OBE (also known as Nancy Cook and Nancy Benko; 9 March 1910 – 21 December 1999) was an Australian bacteriologist. At the height of her career, she was recognised as one of the world's leading authorities on bacteriology, and led research on Salmonella bacteria, antibiotic and vaccine development, and the isolation of the poliovirus.

== Early life and education ==
Atkinson was born in Melbourne, Australia, and grew up in St Kilda, Victoria. She began studying a Bachelor of Science at the University of Melbourne, majoring in chemistry but eventually switching to the relatively new field of bacteriology. She graduated with the bachelor's degree in 1931, followed by a Master of Science in 1932. From 1932 to 1937, she worked as a research scholar and demonstrator in Bacteriology I and Medical Bacteriology, while also delivering practical lectures in Bacteriology II within the university's Department of Bacteriology.

== Scientific career ==
In 1937, Atkinson transferred to the Government of South Australia's Laboratory of Pathology and Bacteriology in Adelaide. The next year, the laboratory was incorporated into the Institute of Medical and Veterinary Science (IMVS) as part of the University of Adelaide. Atkinson continued to work part-time at the institute focused on medical microbiology, specifically research into the public’s immunity to viruses such as influenza, mumps, measles, typhoid and typhus fever, whilst also lecturing in bacteriology at the university. She was promoted to lecturer-in-charge in 1942 at just 32 years old, and reader-in-charge of bacteriology in 1952, whereupon she joined the university full-time. In 1967 she moved to the Department of Oral Biology until her retirement in 1975.

Atkinson's early work at the IMVS involved the development, production and administration of the BCG vaccine in Australia to combat tuberculosis, as encouraged by Darcy Cowan. Atkinson and her team at the institute were responsible for manufacturing the first batch of penicillin in Australia, after eighteen months of work produced enough of the antibiotic to cover a threepenny piece in 1943.

She also regularly issued public requests of samples of Australian flora such as the Geraldton wax and native fungi, which were then analyzed to determine if they could be used to develop new anti-bacterial substances. In 1943, Atkinson developed penicidin, an antibiotic which was proposed to be used as an alternative to penicillin, however the drug was reclassified in the 1960s as a mycotoxin.

Atkinson specialized in the study of Salmonella bacteria. She established and ran the Salmonella Reference Laboratory (later the Australian Salmonella Reference Centre, a national reference laboratory), and published extensively on the subject. In 1943, she discovered a new strain of Salmonella, which she named S. adelaide after South Australia's capital city.

In 1958 Atkinson helped co-found the Australian Institute of Microbiology and helped establish the Australian Institute of Food Science and Technology – South Australian branch and the Water and Waste Water Association.

== Honours ==
At the New Years Honours 1951, Atkinson was made an Officer of the Order of the British Empire.

In 1957, the University of Adelaide awarded Atkinson with a Doctor of Science (DSc) degree for her work on antibiotics and salmonellas.

== Personal life ==
Atkinson's first marriage was to Irving M. Cook, the manager of British Empire Films in South Australia. They had a son, Jonathan, born in April 1948.

Her second marriage was to architect Andrew Benko, with whom she founded and ran the Chalk Hill winery in the McLaren Vale region. Under her married name, Nancy Benko, she wrote two books on Australian art—Art and Artists of South Australia and The Art of David Boyd—as well as a biography of Gustave Barnes for the Australian Dictionary of Biography.
