= Westmead Hospital =

Hospital in Sydney, Australia

- Western Sydney Local Health District

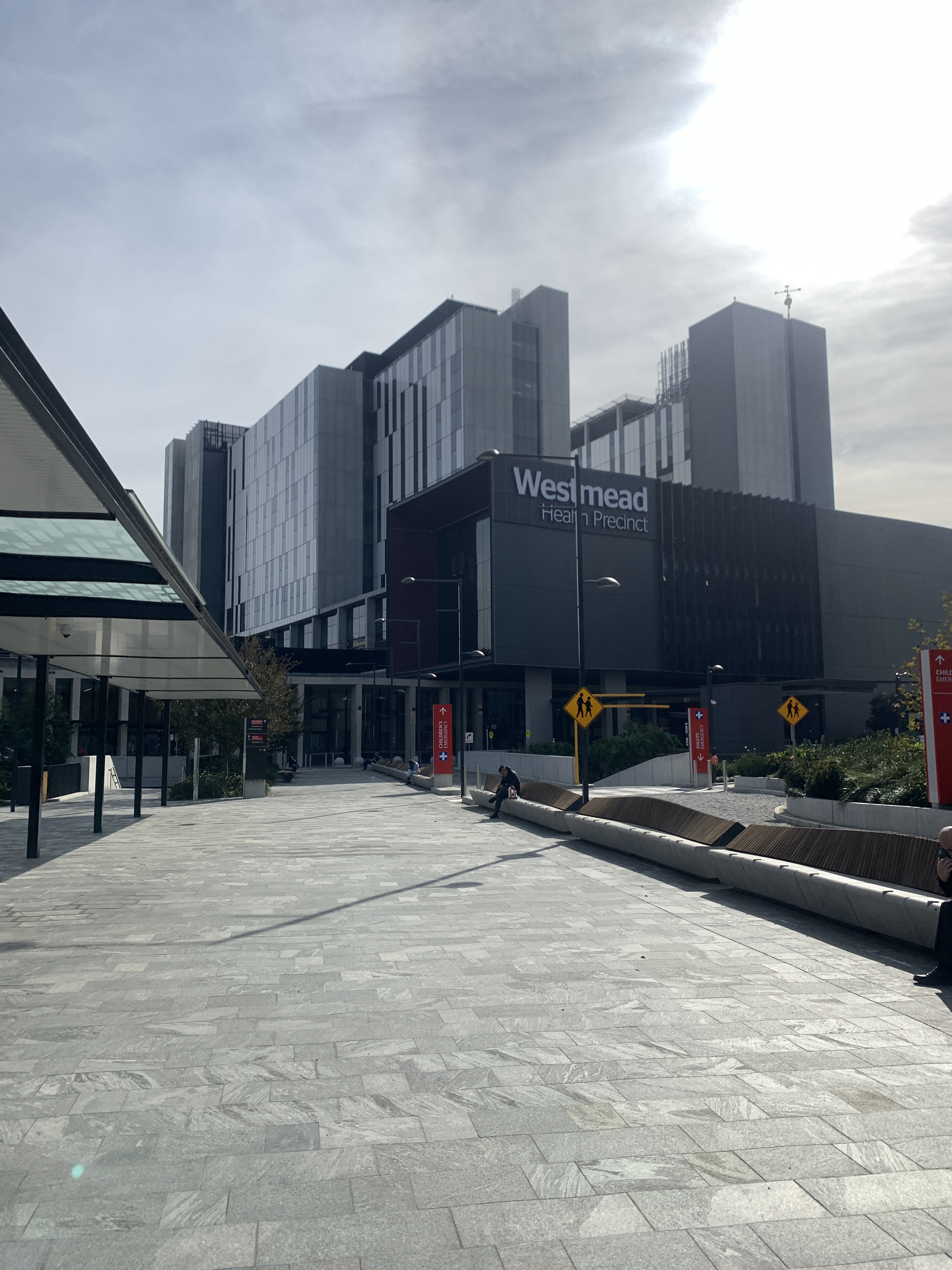
- Westmead Hospital

Geography
- Location: Cnr Hawkesbury Road and Darcy Road, Westmead, New South Wales, Australia
- Coordinates: 33.8045°S 150.9886°E

Organisation
- Care system: Medicare (Australia)
- Type: District General; Teaching
- Affiliated university: University of Sydney
- Network: NSW Health

Services
- Emergency department: Yes; Major Trauma Centre
- Beds: 958

Helipads
- Helipad: ICAO: YWST and YXWS
Number	Length		Surface
Number	ft	m	Surface
1			concrete
2			concrete

History
- Founded: 1978; 48 years ago

Links
- Website: Westmead Hospital
- Lists: Hospitals in Australia

Westmead Hospital is a major teaching hospital in Sydney, Australia. Opened on 10 November 1978, the 975-bed hospital forms part of the Western Sydney Local Health District, and is a teaching hospital of Sydney Medical School at the University of Sydney.

The hospital serves a population of 1.85 million people and is located on one of the largest health and hospital campuses in Australia. In 2016/17, Westmead Hospital provided more than 1.5m occasions of care to outpatients, in addition to approximately 107,000 inpatients. Annually, there are over 21,000 medical operations, almost 5,800 births, and more than 75,000 presentations to emergency department.

Westmead Hospital is located on the junction of Darcy and Hawkesbury Roads in Westmead and provides a full range of tertiary medical and dental services except for paediatrics which is serviced by the adjacent Children's Hospital at Westmead, relocated from Camperdown to Westmead in 1995. The Hospital includes a large Dental Clinical School and extensive clinical pathology and medical research facilities. From 1995 to 2017 the statewide NETS (NSW), the Newborn and paediatric Emergency Transport Service was hosted at Westmead Hospital, prior to moving to make way for a new acute services block for the hospital.

Located nearby are the Cumberland Hospital (providing outpatient and inpatient psychiatric care) and Westmead Private Hospital, a division of Ramsay Health Care.

== History ==
=== Parramatta ===
The history of health service in western Sydney began with a tent hospital established in Parramatta to meet the medical needs of convicts, military personnel, and early settlers in 1789. The hospital at Parramatta saw many changes over the years, firstly in 1818, it was known as the Colonial Hospital and later, in 1897, the hospital was expanded and became known as the Parramatta District Hospital.

As population expanded in Sydney's west, the services provided at Parramatta became inadequate to meet demand. The hospital was the first major tertiary referral health centre in outer Sydney. Prior to its existence, referral health services were provided in inner-city centres such as the Royal Prince Alfred Hospital, the Prince of Wales Hospital, Sydney Hospital, Royal North Shore Hospital and St Vincent's Hospital.

The Westmead Hospital, initially known as the Westmead Centre, was established on 10 November 1978 (opened by Premier Neville Wran with former Prime Minister Gough Whitlam as guest of honour), changing the role of Parramatta Hospital.

Acute services were relocated to Westmead Hospital with the Parramatta building continuing to function as the rehabilitation arm of Westmead Hospital. In 1991, all services moved out of the old Parramatta Hospital and in 1995 the building was decommissioned and redeveloped into the Parramatta Justice Precinct. Parramatta Community Health Centre, located in Jeffery House, still operates on part of the original site.

=== Area Health Services ===
Westmead Hospital, together with the Parramatta Hospital, was initially governed by a local hospital Board. When local boards were restructured into Area Health Services by the Government of New South Wales, Westmead Hospital became part of the Western Sydney Area Health Service, together with Westmead Dental Hospital, Cumberland Hospital (mental health services), district hospitals at Blacktown, Auburn and Mount Druitt. In 2005, the boundaries of the Area Health Services were changed, and, up until 31 December 2010, Westmead Hospital was one of two tertiary teaching hospitals (together with Nepean Hospital in Penrith), part of the Sydney West Area Health Service.

=== Local Hospital District ===
Following the formation of Local Health Networks on 1 January 2011, Westmead Hospital became part of the Western Sydney Local Health District, together with Westmead Dental Hospital, and district hospitals at Blacktown, Auburn and Mount Druitt.

=== Major refurbishments ===
In 2004, a contract worth in excess of A$142 million for refurbishment and development of new facilities at Westmead Hospital was awarded to Thiess. As works were nearly completion in July 2007, NSW Minister for Health, Reba Meagher together with NSW Member for Parramatta Tanya Gadiel inspected the new Women's Health and Newborn Care Centre that provides a new birthing unit, special care nursery and neonatal intensive care unit, 41 bed maternity ward, antenatal and gynaecology inpatient wards and ambulatory care clinics in the one location. It is expected that by 2011, more than 5,000 babies will be born at Westmead Hospital each year.

Refurbishment of cancer wards at Westmead Hospital occurred at around the same time; based on the US-style comprehensive cancer centre model. In 2011, the facilities were renamed as the Crown Princess Mary Cancer Centre Westmead. Inspecting the facilities during 2007, Ms Meagher stated:

This means that patient care at every level will be organised to ensure smooth transition between hospital inpatient services, community treatment or palliative care as people's care needs change. The co-location of a range of speciality cancer services means patients will be able to receive diagnoses and a range of treatments and rehabilitation without the need to make separate trips.

Other facilities to be refurbished under the Theiss contract included facilities for intensive care and renal treatments.

In March 2012, a food-court style emporium was opened on the ground level precinct introducing a wide variety of cuisines to the standard hospital fare, including a sweets and desserts cafe, kebabs, pizza, fresh salads and sandwich bar, gelato station, and various selections of hot foods. A number of retail stores including a hair and beauty salon, phones outlet, pharmacy and convenience store is also under development.

== Services ==
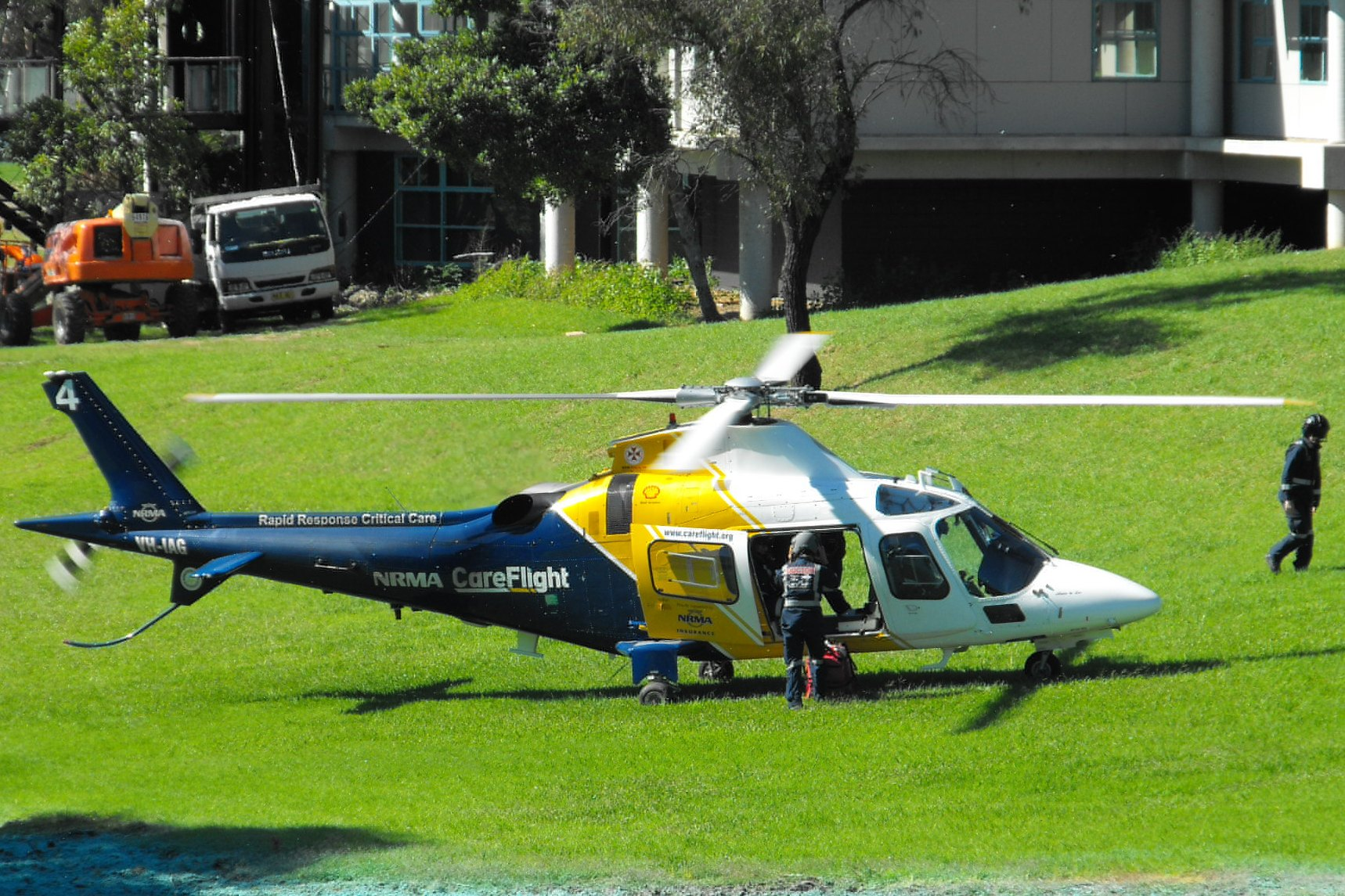
CareFlight air ambulance

As well as General Wards, there are a range of high dependency wards at Westmead Hospital including a Coronary Care Unit, an Intensive Care Unit, a Special Care Nursery, High Dependency Wards, and a Neonatal Intensive Care Unit. For a full list of service, refer to the table in links below.

Westmead Emergency Department is one of the busiest in Australia seeing over 52,000 adult patients annually. It is supported by tertiary specialist services including 24 hours and 7 days a week interventional cardiology, trauma services, cardiothoracic surgery, neurosurgery and toxicology.

Westmead Medical Research Foundation provides fundraising support and community advocacy for medical research and patient care at Westmead.

Westmead Hospital is the base for the New South Wales helicopter operations of CareFlight air ambulance service. Its aircraft and trained medical and operational crews respond to emergencies threatening the life, health and safety of people caused through medical emergency, illness, natural disaster, accidents or mishap. Within Westmead Hospital exists the Trauma Service, which provides research and education of injury prevention, and death statistics.

Acute Intervention Medicine	Aged Care, Neurology and Rehabilitation	Allied Health	Anaesthetics	Brain Injury Rehabilitation Unit	Cardiac Services	Chronic and Continuing Care	Community Education	Community Health Services
Dermatology	Diabetes and Endocrinology	Division of Imaging	Emergency Services	Endocrinology	General surgery	Intensive Care Unit	Library, Westmead Hospital	Mental Health
Neurology	Nuclear medicine & Ultrasound	Nursing	Ophthalmology	Oral Health, Dentistry	Pathology Services	Patient Education	Plastic surgery	Primary Care
Public Health and Community Medicine	Radiology	Rehabilitation Medicine	Renal and Transplant Surgery	Resident Support Unit	Respiratory Medicine	Rheumatology	Sexual Health	Women's Health

== Teaching and research ==
Since its establishment in 1978, the Westmead Clinical School of Sydney University at Westmead Hospital has been a place of innovation and growth. The Faculty of Medicine is Australia's oldest and largest medical faculty (established as Sydney Medical School in 1856) undertaking teaching and research in health and medicine of international standing. As part of the Western Clinical School, teaching facilities at Westmead form an integral part of education as the largest of the University's centres of clinical care in Sydney. The University supported the establishment of research clinicians in all key staff specialist postings at the hospital in 1978.

The Hospital accepted its first dental patients in 1980. The Westmead Hospital Dental Clinical School (now the Westmead Centre for Oral Health) has become a major facility for the Faculty of Dentistry for both undergraduate and postgraduate education and training.

Medical research has been taking place at Westmead Hospital since the early 1980s. In 1996, medical research facilities were consolidated through the establishment of the Westmead Millennium Institute for Medical Research (WMI). Initially with just 60 scientists and doctors, the Institute now has over 450 medical research scientists.

== See also ==
- Healthcare in Australia
- Lists of hospitals
- List of hospitals in Australia
