= Children's Medical Research Institute =

Australian medical research institute

- Established: 1958
- Research type: Medical research
- Field of research: Genetic research; Cancer; Epilepsy; Birth defects
- Director: Professor Roger Reddel AO FAA
- Address: 214 Hawkesbury Road, Westmead NSW 2145
- Location: Sydney, New South Wales, Australia; 33°48′05″S 150°59′32″E
- Campus: Westmead
- Affiliations: University of Sydney; The Children's Hospital at Westmead
- Website: cmri.org.au

Children's Medical Research Institute (CMRI) is an Australian medical research institute located in Westmead that conducts research into children's genetic diseases. As of 2019, current research is focused on cancer, birth defects, neurological conditions such as epilepsy, and gene therapy.

Much of CMRI's cancer research focuses on telomeres (including telomerase) and the Alternative Lengthening of Telomeres (ALT) mechanism, which was discovered at CMRI in 1997.

== History ==
The foundation was founded by Professor Lorimer Dods, who was Australia's first professor of children's health, and Sir John Fulton. The foundation raised a lot of money from early telethons in Australia. Dods eventually gave up his teaching role at the University of Sydney to work with the foundation. In 1968 one of the foundations supporters, Glynde Nesta Griffiths who was a writer, died and she left her estate of £300,000 to the foundation.

The director of the foundation is "the Lorimer Dods Professor".

== See also ==
- Health in Australia
