= The Broadcaster =

The Broadcaster, The Biz, Merrylands Broadcaster
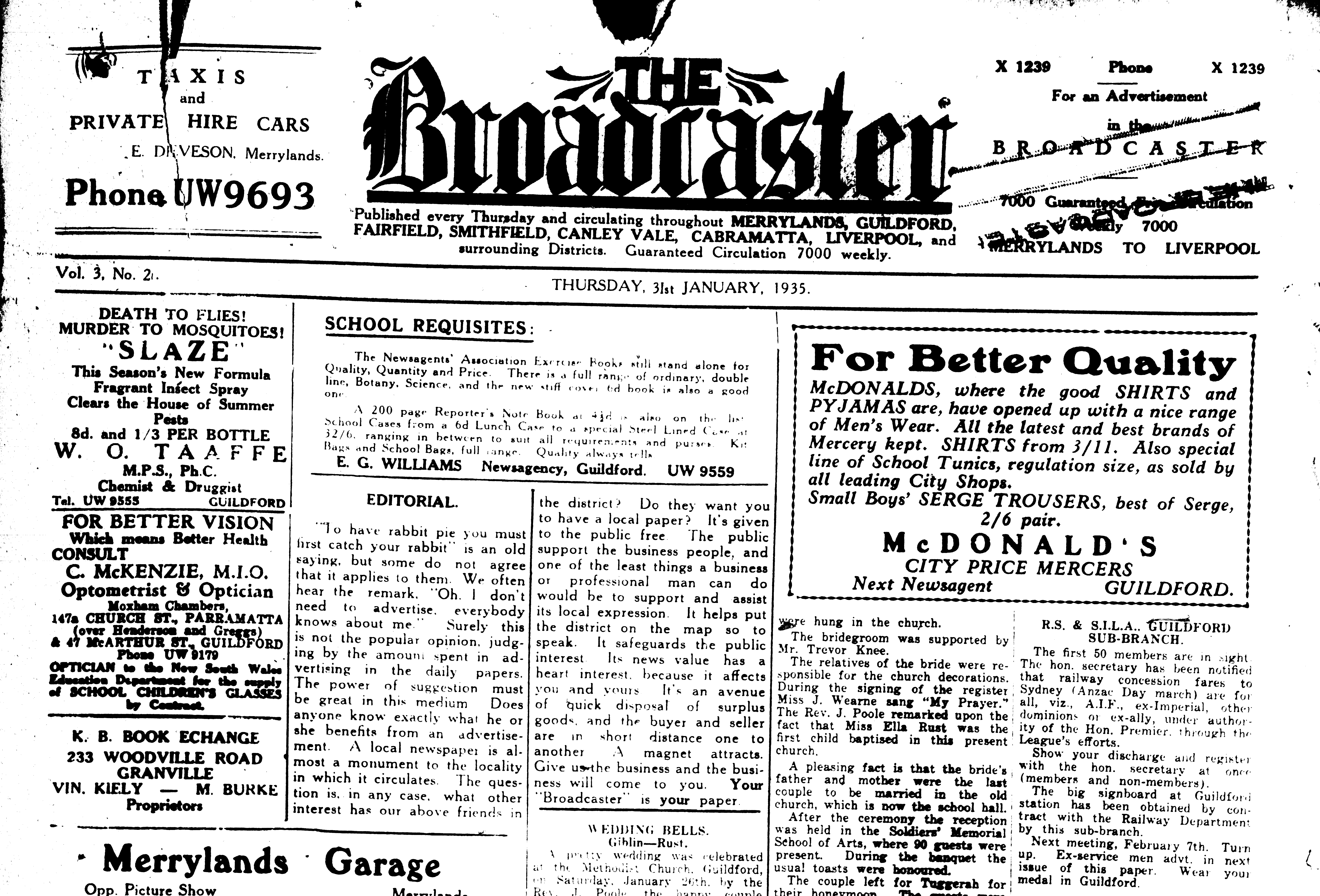
- Masthead of The Broadcaster from Thursday 31 January 1935, when the newspaper was published in Guildford, New South Wales and distributed between Merrylands and Liverpool
- Founded: 1932
- Ceased publication: 1978
- Language: English
- City: Western Sydney, New South Wales
- Country: Australia

The Broadcaster was an English language local community tabloid newspaper published by several owners in Western Sydney, New South Wales, Australia that principally covered the Municipality of Holroyd and surrounding districts. It was first published in Guildford in 1932, but became a title of The Biz newspaper publishing company located in Fairfield, in 1935. The Broadcaster eventually came under the control of Cumberland Newspapers in 1958 and was retitled the Merrylands Broadcaster from April 1975. The newspaper ceased publication around 1978.

== History ==
First published in 1932 by David Hume from his parents' home at 18 Fairview Street, Guildford, New South Wales and printed by the North Shore Press in North Sydney, The Broadcaster was a free weekly local newspaper published on Thursdays throughout Merrylands, Guildford, Fairfield, Smithfield, Canley Vale, Cabramatta, Liverpool and surrounding districts. It reported on local government issues, local community organisation and sporting activities, personal news, including family notices, and advertising of local businesses. O. H. Dumbrill, of Cross Street, Guildford, collected advertising and news reports from community organisations. By January 1935, The Broadcaster had a guaranteed circulation of 7,000 copies.

The heavy costs involved in publishing, printing and distributing the newspaper over such a wide area resulted in Hume being unable to continue, and the ownership of The Broadcaster was transferred to William (Bill) J. Bright, owner and publisher of The Biz newspaper in Fairfield, on 28 March 1935. The new proprietor's printing office in Smart Street, Fairfield had new and up-to-date plant and staff capable of handling the whole undertaking. To further reduce costs, Bright decided to confine the circulation to Holroyd and surrounding districts and give preference to local advertisers. The first issue published by Bright was Vol. 3, No. 11, dated Thursday 4 April 1935. By 1942, Bright was producing three newspaper titles on Thursdays - The Broadcaster, The Biz and The Liverpool News, but the workload became difficult to maintain and the decision was made to bring the publication date of the smaller four-page Broadcaster forward to Wednesdays, with any local news crowded-out of the paper to be published in the larger six-page Biz, the following day. The first Wednesday edition of The Broadcaster was dated 19 August 1942.

Following Bill Bright's retirement in 1958, Cumberland Newspapers Ltd obtained ownership of The Biz newspapers stable of titles, including The Broadcaster. The Broadcaster was retained by the new owners as a free weekly community newspaper, now published on Tuesdays. While the paper was printed at the Cumberland Newspaper's Parramatta offices, The Broadcaster had its own office, located at 204 Merrylands Road, Merrylands.

By 1963, three of Cumberland Newspaper's titles - The Advance, The Biz and The Broadcaster, were operating from the same office, located in Spencer Street, Fairfield. Senior journalist Tasman Pellas was the virtual editor for all three papers, responsible for writing, proof-reading, cutting articles to fit the space left by advertising, write the headlines and hand deliver the finished product to the printer at Parramatta, before the deadline.

With an increase in the Holroyd population, and following a community survey, Cumberland Newspapers decided to extend the coverage of the paper to include the suburbs of Merrylands West, Greystanes and South Wentworthville, as far as the Great Western Highway, increasing the circulation by 5,000 to 17,500. In August 1971, The Broadcaster office was relocated from Fairfield to 130 Merrylands Road, on the corner of Military Road, Merrylands, with Cumberland Newspapers proclaiming that "Holroyd's own newspaper" had returned home. The paper was given a new masthead from the following edition, dated 18 August 1971, which included a welcome message by the Mayor of Holroyd, Ald. R. W. D. Devlin. Circulation increased to 20,000 copies in 1972, circulating around the suburbs of Merrylands, Guildford, Greystanes, South Wentworthville, Mays Hill and portions of Smithfield.

The Broadcaster was retitled the Merrylands Broadcaster with issue Vol. 42, No. 16, Tuesday, 22 April 1975. The paper continued to be printed and published by Cumberland Newspapers, for the Broadcaster's office in Merrylands Road. The Merrylands Broadcaster ceased publication in 1978.

== Availability ==
Hardcopy of The Broadcaster and Merrylands Broadcaster is available from 31 January 1935 – 23 May 1978, with gaps in the collection. These issues are held by the State Library of New South Wales in offsite storage.

Gosford Micrographics Pty Ltd filmed the available issues of The Broadcaster and the Merrylands Broadcaster onto 13 reels of 35mm microfilm in August 1993, titled Broadcaster (Fairfield). This microfilm can be viewed at the State Library of New South Wales and at Holroyd City Council Library Service.

All surviving issues of The Broadcaster, dated between 1935 and 1978, are now available on the National Library of Australia's Trove Australian digitised newspaper and more website, made available through the support of Holroyd City Council Library Service.

== See also ==
- List of newspapers in Australia
- List of defunct newspapers of Australia
- List of newspapers in New South Wales
