= The Cumberland Argus and Fruitgrowers' Advocate =

Former newspaper in Greater Western Sydney

Masthead of The Cumberland Argus and Fruitgrowers' Advocate from 9 April 1898, showing the incorporation of several local newspapers

The The Cumberland Argus and Fruitgrowers' Advocate (also known as The Cumberland Argus or The Argus) was a newspaper published in Parramatta with coverage and circulation incorporating Greater Western Sydney and parts of North-West Sydney, Australia. First published on 24 September 1887, the paper continued under this title until issue No. 3397, on 15 March 1950, when renamed the Cumberland Argus. It remained under this banner for a further 12 years until it ceased publication on 24 October 1962.

== History ==
Masthead of The Cumberland Argus and Fruitgrowers' Advocate on 22 September 1888.

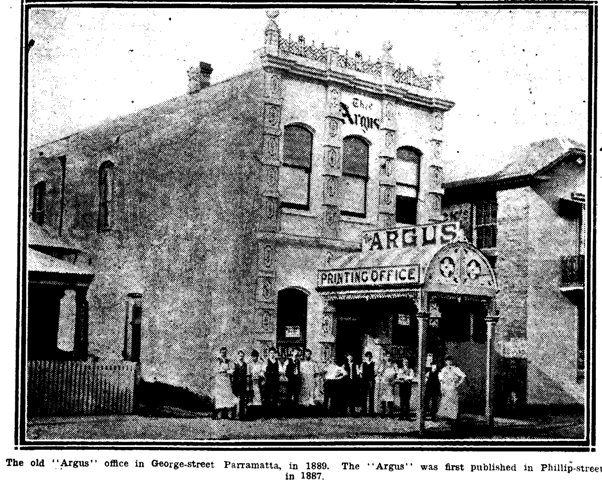
The Cumberland Argus office in George Street, Parramatta, circa 1889

The newspaper was founded by Thomas Little, Frederick Lovell, Richard Richardson and Alfred Gazzard, all formerly associated with The Cumberland Mercury newspaper. The paper's office was located in Phillip Street, later George Street, Parramatta, with correspondents located around various districts. Initially issued weekly on Saturdays, costing 2d an issue, a subscription to The Cumberland Argus cost 2 shillings per quarter in 1888.

The proprietors of The Cumberland Argus and Fruitgrowers' Advocate effectively marketed their paper by involving themselves in many local organisations in the Central Cumberland district, such as providing a prize for the Central Cumberland Agricultural and Horticultural Association's Show; having a hand in the formation of the Central Cumberland Cricket Association, and sponsoring the main prize for its junior cricket competition The Cumberland Argus Cup; and successfully organising The Cumberland Argus Fruit Show, an annual fruit exhibition, that not only promoted their newspaper, but also showcased the fruit growing industry from around the Cumberland Plain, and raised money for the Parramatta District Hospital.

The Cumberland Argus and Fruitgrowers' Advocate was promoted as "the recognised local paper, largest circulation, best advertising medium." The paper was endorsed by the Fruitgrowers' Union of New South Wales, resolving that "a copy of the paper, containing reports on (its) meetings be sent to every town in the colony."

The Windsor & Richmond Gazette called The Cumberland Argus "one of the best of colonial weekly papers", much to the delight of The Cumberland Argus proprietors.

Lovell, who was the main Editor of paper, died in February 1888, leaving Richardson to take up editorial duties. Gazzard retired from the newspaper in February 1893, leaving Little and Richardson to run the paper by themselves.

The remaining owners of The Cumberland Argus purchased their rival publication The Cumberland Mercury, along with The River Times, a Ryde newspaper and The Weekly Advance, from Granville, in April 1895 and incorporated all three papers into The Cumberland Argus with issue Vol. VIII, no. 397, dated 4 May 1895. The three newspapers were owned at the time by Cyrus E. Fuller, a printer and stationer. Little and Richardson also acquired Fuller's Lightning Printing Works based in Macquarie Street, Parramatta.

The proprietors of The Cumberland Argus purchased The Cumberland Free Press and Ryde Electorate Press newspapers in March 1898, which were incorporated into The Cumberland Argus with Vol. XI, issue no. 534, dated 2 April 1898.

Masthead of the first Wednesday Edition of The Cumberland Argus and Fruitgrowers' Advocate on 6 April 1898.

This merger provided The Cumberland Argus with more districts to cover, and the owners decided to issue the newspaper twice weekly (on Wednesdays and Saturdays) commencing with Vol. XI, issue no. 535, dated Wednesday 6 April 1898, to allow the paper to "faithfully and fully report the district's proceedings."

Little and Richardson retained the services of John Black and G. B. Davey, the former owners of The Cumberland Free Press.

The Saturday edition continued to cost 2d, with the Wednesday edition costing 1d per issue. The quarterly subscription for both issues was 6d.

On the eve of 1903, The Cumberland Argus, was promoted to potential advertisers as, "one of the Largest and Most Widely Read Provincial Papers in N.S.W.", being circulated "over the large Industrial and Horticultural District of Central Cumberland."

In February 1912, Messrs. Little and Richardson registered Cumberland Argus Ltd., with a capital of £25,000 in £1 shares on the Sydney Stock Exchange.

Richardson retired from the newspaper with 8 June 1912 issue (Vol. XXV, No. 1927), leaving Thomas Little as the sole remaining founder and proprietor of The Cumberland Argus and Fruitgrowers' Advocate.

After nearly 35 years, Little left the newspaper with the Saturday 1 April 1922 issue. Mr. Leslie S. Phillips became the Managing Director and Publisher of The Cumberland Argus Ltd., from Vol. XXXV, No. 2822, issued on 5 April 1922.

From Vol. XXXVI, No. 3057, dated 22 July 1924, The Cumberland Argus was issued on Tuesdays and Fridays, reflecting the actual day of publication.

In August 1928, the management of The Cumberland Argus and Fruitgrowers' Advocate announced that "The Argus" would be published on Mondays and Thursdays.

Despite it being "more convenient for all connected with the paper to continue the publication on Tuesdays and Fridays", the majority of their advertisers had requested the change to Thursdays, to allow the newspapers' "thousands of readers" time to read "most of its contents before proceeding to make their week end purchases." The advantage of the Monday edition was that readers would be given the weekend news and sporting results a day earlier. The first issue published on Monday was Vol. XL, No. 3479, dated 3 September 1928.

The Monday edition cost 1d, with Thursday 3d. An annual subscription for both issues costing 4s in advance.

After 14 years as head of The Cumberland Argus, Mr. Leslie Phillips retired as Managing Director of the newspaper. Phillips disposed of The Cumberland Argus to Cumberland Newspapers, a "local syndicate" founded only two weeks earlier, with Mr. Earl S. White taking over as Managing Director from Vol. LXVI, No. 4250, dated 25 June 1936.

White's first job in newspapers had been as a 17-year-old, part-time reporter with The Cumberland Argus. He eventually founded the Parramatta Advertiser in 1933, in competition with his former employer and helped form Cumberland Newspapers .

With issue No. 4425, dated 11 May 1938, The Cumberland Argus and Fruitgrowers' Advocate was once again issued weekly, now on Wednesdays, with an issue costing 3d. A full-page advertisement, appearing in the previous issue promised that the new Cumberland Argus, "this greatest of district papers", would include "features to interest the whole family", including "comprehensive sporting reviews" for the Fathers, a new Women's supplement and fashion pages for the Mothers and "comic strips for the youngsters."

== Cumberland Argus ==
The newspaper, still published by Cumberland Newspapers, was renamed the Cumberland Argus with issue No.3398, on 22 March 1950, and was relaunched as a free newspaper, issued weekly on Wednesdays, with a guaranteed circulation of 22,500 to every home, shop, flat and office located between Northmead and Villawood.

In February 1960, News Limited acquired Cumberland Newspapers and its chain of Sydney-suburban community newspapers, including the Cumberland Argus, for £1 million.

In May 1960 a new masthead was introduced, with an increased circulation of 35,000 (up from 28,100 at the beginning of the year) and an increased coverage now including suburbs east and north-east of Parramatta, such as Rydalmere, Dundas and Telopea

Issue No. 5018, dated 29 June 1960, was the last edition to be numbered. The following week a new masthead was introduced, with the newspaper announcing its coverage was expanding westward, delivering between Wentworthville and Lalor Park, and increasing its circulation to 45,000 copies each week.

Two issues later, the Cumberland Argus extended its coverage again, this time to Baulkham Hills and Castle Hill, its circulation now 50,000 copies per week.

The Cumberland Argus incorporated The Parramatta Mail, from its 26 July 1961 issue. This acquisition had no significant effect on its circulation or coverage.

A decision by Cumberland Newspapers, to incorporate the Cumberland Argus into a Wednesday edition of the Parramatta Advertiser, was announced in the last issue of the Cumberland Argus dated 24 October 1962. The decision being made in line with the company's policy of expansion, and followed a "searching investigation of reader requirements."

The Wednesday edition of the Parramatta Advertiser was introduced as an addition to the regular Thursday edition, and was to be similar in format and presentation. However the proposed circulation on the Wednesday edition of the Parramatta Advertiser was concentrated to Parramatta City Council and the north-eastern portion of the Holroyd Municipality – a smaller circulation than the Thursday edition, and that of the Cumberland Argus.

== Availability ==
The hardcopy of The Cumberland Argus and Fruitgrowers' Advocate is known to exist from Vol II, No. 53, dated 22 September 1888 onwards, and is held by the State Library of New South Wales in offsite storage.

The Cumberland Argus and Fruitgrowers' Advocate and the Cumberland Argus were microfilmed by W. & F. Pascoe between 1985 and 1995 onto 55 reels of 35mm microfilm.

The microfilm can be viewed at the State Library of New South Wales, the National Library of Australia, and the public library services of Blacktown City Council, Fairfield City Council, Holroyd City Council and Liverpool City Council, and the Granville Historical Society.

Parramatta City Council Library Service holds the microfilm covering 1893 onwards, at its Heritage Centre.

Hornsby Shire Library and Information Service and the University of Western Sydney Ward Library, located at its Penrith Campus, both hold the microfilm of the newspaper from 22 September 1888 through to 26 December 1935.

City of Ryde Library Service holds the microfilm of The Cumberland Argus from 22 September 1888 until 27 December 1934.

Hawkesbury City Council Library Service holds the microfilm from 22 September 1888 until 31 December 1904.

Both The Cumberland Argus and Fruitgrowers' Advocate and the Cumberland Argus are available to the public to freely search and view, via the National Library of Australia's Trove website.

The project to digitise the newspaper was partly funded by Auburn, Blacktown, Campbelltown, Fairfield, The Hills, Holroyd, Hornsby, Liverpool, Parramatta and Ryde Councils and the University of Western Sydney Library. Contractors for the National Library scanned the master microfilm provided by the State Library of New South Wales, and added OCR to the digital images.

An application submitted by Holroyd Council on behalf of Auburn, Blacktown, Campbelltown, Fairfield, Hawkesbury, The Hills, Hornsby, Parramatta and Ryde Councils, for the amount of $59,000.00 towards the cost of digitising more of The Cumberland Argus, was one of the successful Library Development Grant applications for 2011/12, made available through the Library Council of New South Wales. This funding provided free online access to the 1920–1950 portion of The Cumberland Argus and Fruitgrowers' Advocate.

== Indexes ==
A selective index of The Cumberland Argus is available from the Ryde Local Studies Database at Ryde Library Service.

An index of extracts from The Cumberland Argus from 1900 to 1914 was published by the Beecroft and Cheltenham History Group in 1996.

An index to soldiers from the Parramatta District who served in World War I was compiled by N. Trembath in 1995, using the records of the Cumberland Argus.

The Ryerson Index, an online index of death notices and obituaries appearing in Australian Newspapers, has begun indexing death notices and obituaries appearing in The Cumberland Argus and Fruitgrowers' Advocate.
