= The Cumberland Free Press =

Australian newspaper, 1875–1895

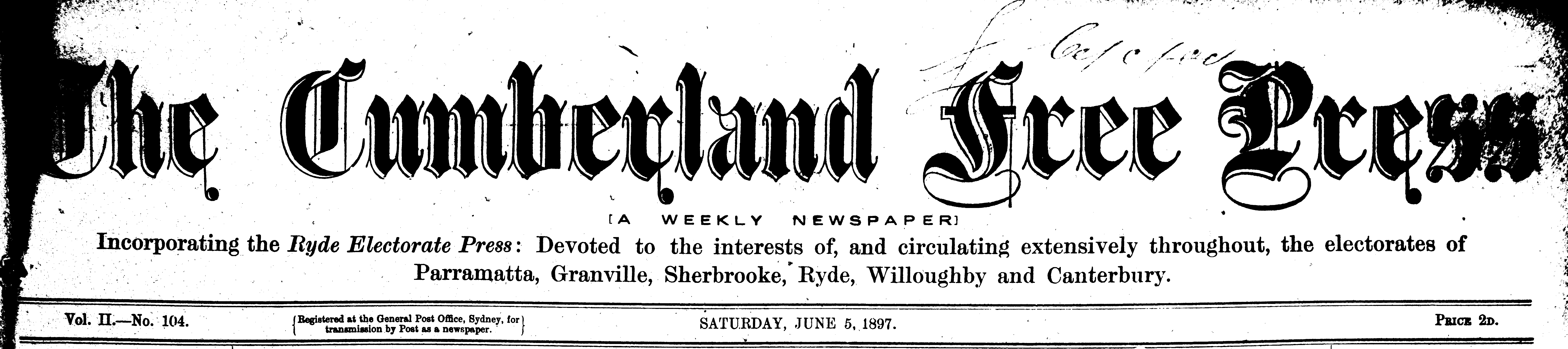
Masthead of The Cumberland Free Press, Vol. II, No. 104, Saturday, 5 June 1897, following the incorporation of the Ryde Electorate Press, in May 1897.

The Cumberland Free Press was a short-lived weekly Australian newspaper published and printed in Parramatta, New South Wales, with a coverage extending across the Inner West, Western and North West regions of Sydney. The paper was first published on 22 June 1895 and ceased publication in March 1898.

== History ==
The Cumberland Free Press was published by John Black and Company, located in Church Street, Parramatta. The company had been founded in 1895 by John Black, George B. Davey and William Henry Hillis, three former employees of The Cumberland Mercury, a newspaper that had recently been absorbed by The Cumberland Argus and Fruitgrowers' Advocate.

The first edition of the paper was issued on Saturday, 22 June 1895, with the masthead proclaiming that the newspaper was "devoted to the interests of and circulating extensively throughout the electorates of Parramatta, Granville, Sherbrooke, Ryde, Willoughby and Canterbury." The first issue was described as being "well edited and printed and holds liberal views on political matters."

In May 1897, The Cumberland Free Press was being published by John Black & Company in Parramatta and Ryde, with the Ryde Electorate Press newspaper officially incorporated into The Cumberland Free Press from the issue dated Saturday, 5 June 1897. The Ryde Electorate Press had only been in operation since November 1896.

On 25 March 1898, The Cumberland Free Press (along with the Ryde Electorate Press) was purchased by the owners of The Cumberland Argus and Fruitgrowers' Advocate. Black, Davey and other staff from the Free Press were retained by The Cumberland Argus. The acquisition provided the new owners with more districts to cover and to sell their paper in. As a result, the owners began to publish The Cumberland Argus twice a week, introducing a Wednesday edition, to "faithfully and fully report the district's proceedings." The Cumberland Free Press was officially incorporated into The Cumberland Argus and Fruitgrowers' Advocate from the issue dated Saturday, 2 April 1898.

== Availability ==
Hardcopy of The Cumberland Free Press is available from Vol. I, No. 1, 22 June 1895 to 1896. These issues are held by the State Library of New South Wales in offsite storage.

In August 1993, Gosford Micrographics Pty Ltd filmed the issues of The Cumberland Free Press, covering Vol. 1, No. 1, 22 June 1895 to Vol. 2, No. 107, 26 June 1897, onto two reels of 35mm microfilm.

This microfilm is available to view at the National Library of Australia, State Library of New South Wales, and the public library services of Holroyd, Hornsby and Parramatta Councils.

The Cumberland Free Press has been digitised and is available on the National Library of Australia's Trove Australian newspapers and more website.

== Indexes ==
The Ryerson Index, an online index of death notices and obituaries appearing in Australian newspapers, has begun indexing death notices and obituaries appearing in The Cumberland Free Press.

== See also ==
- List of newspapers in Australia
- List of defunct newspapers of Australia
- List of newspapers in New South Wales
- The Cumberland Argus and Fruitgrowers' Advocate
