= Liverpool–Parramatta T-way =

Busway in Sydney, Australia

Overview
- Operator: Transit Systems
- Began service: 2 February 2003

Route
- Start: Liverpool station
- Via: Bonnyrigg
- End: Parramatta station
- Length: 31 km (19.3 mi)

The Liverpool–Parramatta T-way is a continuous series of bus-only lanes and bus roadways between Parramatta and Liverpool in Western Sydney. Completed in February 2003, the 31 km (19.3 mi) T-way was the first bus rapid transit infrastructure to be built in Sydney.

== Design and construction ==
A project of the New South Wales Ministry of Transport and the Roads & Traffic Authority, the T-way cost $346 million to build.

The route runs through the central business district of Parramatta, before heading onto the Great Western Highway to South Wentworthville, after which it heads onto its own alignment next to the Sydney Water pipeline that runs from Prospect Reservoir. It then proceeds on its own alignment in an old freeway reservation through to Hoxton Park. At Brickmakers' Creek in Liverpool, it heads onto its own alignment to the centre of Liverpool and Liverpool railway station bus interchange. The system includes active traffic signal priority to give buses preference where the route crosses other roadways.

== Stations ==
Interactive map of the Liverpool–Parramatta T-way. Only the sections that are separate from public roads are marked, but the map includes all stops along the T-way.

The Liverpool–Parramatta T-way has 35 stations, spaced approximately every 800 metres. These stations are more substantial than conventional bus stops, which has led to criticism that the system is overly costly and vulnerable to vandalism. Stations feature closed-circuit television, real-time information screens, emergency help points, audio announcements and extensive landscaping.

One station, Parramatta Station, also forms part of the North-West T-way. The other stations are, from Parramatta:

- Pitt, near Pitt Street, Parramatta (As of 2025, the Bus Stop in the direction to Parramatta Station is no longer used)
- Mays Hill
- Coleman, near Coleman Street, South Wentworthville
- Finlayson, near Finlaysons Creek, South Wentworthville
- Centenary, on Centenary Road, South Wentworthville
- Sherwood, on Sherwood Road, Merrylands West
- Canal, near a Sydney Water canal and next to both Merrylands High School, Merrylands West and Cerdon College, Merrylands West, New South Wales
- Woodpark
- Warren, near Warren Road, Smithfield
- Smithfield
- Cooper, near Cooper Street, Smithfield
- Gipps, near Gipps Road, Smithfield
- Hassall, near Hassall Street, Wetherill Park
- Wetherill Park
- Elizabeth, near Elizabeth Street, Wetherill Park
- Victoria, on Victoria Street, Wetherill Park
- Horsley, near The Horsley Drive, Wetherill Park
- Prairiewood next to Stockland Wetherill Park
- Orphan School, near Orphan School Creek, Bossley Park
- St Johns Park
- Clear Paddock, near Clear Paddock Creek, Greenfield Park
- Bonnyrigg
- Brown, near Brown Road, Bonnyrigg Heights
- Green Valley
- Busby
- Cartwright, near Cartwright Avenue, Hinchinbrook
- Hinchinbrook
- Miller
- Ash, near Ash Road, Cartwright
- Maxwells, near Maxwells Creek, Liverpool
- Brickmakers, near Brickmakers Creek, Liverpool
- Memorial, near Memorial Avenue, Liverpool
- Macquarie, near Macquarie Street and Westfield Liverpool, Liverpool
- Liverpool, at Liverpool station

Originally there were 36 T-Way stops, however one T-Way stop closed pretty soon after the T-Way opened. Argyle T-Way was on Argyle Street, Parramatta allowing for passengers to alight for Westfield Parramatta.

== Services ==
There are a number of services using portions of the T-way. The only service to have two numbers is 80, which runs along the whole stretch of the T-way. In the financial year ended June 2012, 2.77 million passengers used the T-way services.

Provision of the service 80 (formerly T80) was put out to tender and an eight-year contract awarded to Western Sydney Buses. Services were initially provided by 17 natural-gas Mercedes-Benz O405NH buses in blue and yellow T-way livery. These were replaced in 2004 by diesel Volvo B12BLEs.

Since October 2013, services have been operated by Transit Systems as part of its Sydney Bus Region 3 contract. All State Transit bus fleet used for the T-way were transferred to Transit Systems. The liveries of these buses still show the colours of State Transit, blue and white, with some now in the Transport NSW livery. Buses inherited from State Transit had on-board audio announcements and green automatic validating machines which have since been replaced by Opal validators like other buses. Now it uses double deck, bendy and rigid buses.

T80 was the first Rapid bus route in Sydney.

On June 21 2026, Transport for NSW renumbered the T80 service to 80. It now operates as a 24 hour service and serves seven days a week between Parramatta and Liverpool via the T-way.

Services run every:

- 10 minutes during the day
- 20 minutes in the early morning and late evening
- 60 minutes overnight.
