= Parramatta Advertiser =

Weekly regional newspaper from Parramatta, Australia

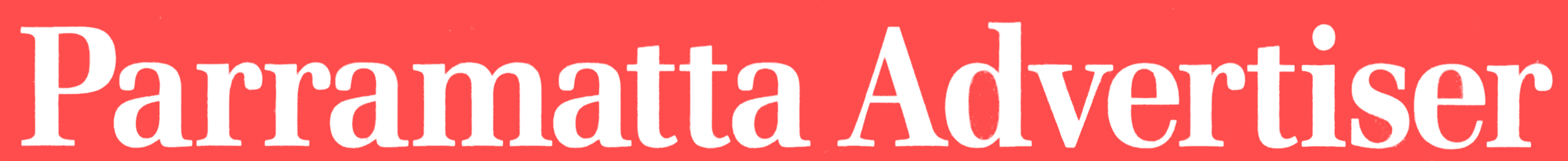
- Type: Weekly newspaper
- Format: Tabloid, online
- Owner: NewsLocal
- Editor: Simone Roberts
- Founded: 15 July 1933; 93 years ago
- Headquarters: Parramatta, Australia
- Website: parramattaadvertiser.com.au

The Parramatta Advertiser is a weekly regional newspaper that serves the communities of Parramatta, Auburn and Holroyd local government areas and covers local news, sport, council decisions, and community events. This newspaper is published every Wednesday. It currently has a circulation of 79,598, and a readership of 78,000.

The Parramatta Advertiser was launched on 15 June 1933 by the Cumberland Newspaper Group. It eventually became the successor to The Cumberland Argus when it was incorporated into the Parramatta Advertiser in 1962.

Originally a bi-weekly, it became Cumberland Newspaper Group's "flagship" regional newspaper, and at that time it was the largest regional newspaper in Australia.

Since that time, it has been the main local newspaper for the City of Parramatta. In 1995, the Parramatta Advertiser was split into 3 separate editions: City (Parramatta) North, Auburn, and Holroyd.

The online edition of the paper is now under the umbrella of the Daily Telegraph, a major Australian daily newspaper.

The Parramatta Advertiser's death and other notices are indexed by the Ryerson Index. Previous copies of the newspaper are archived on microfilm at the State Library of New South Wales.
