= Weekly Advance =

Newspaper in Granville, New South Wales, Australia, 1892 and 1894.

The Weekly Advance was an English-language tabloid newspaper published in Granville, New South Wales, Australia, between 1892 and 1894. The paper principally covered the townships of Granville, Auburn, and Rookwood, with circulation and content extending to Clyde. Flemington, Homebush, Strathfield, Bankstown, Mortlake, Newington, Merrylands, Guildford, Smithfield and Fairfield.

== History ==
The first issue of the Weekly Advance was published on February 5, 1892, with issues released weekly on Fridays. The paper was published by W. H. Windsor at the paper's office, located at the Colonnade, Granville and printed by Fuller's Lightning Printing Works Company, at Parramatta. The Lightning Printing Works were owned by C. E. Fuller and Co., proprietor of the Weekly Advance, who also owned The Cumberland Mercury and Parramatta Gazette, and a Ryde-based newspaper the River Times.

On 28 April 1894, Cyrus Fuller announced that his company's three newspaper titles would be unified, with the Weekly Advance and River Times absorbed into a retitled The Cumberland Mercury. The change took effect from The Cumberland Mercury issue Vol. XXIX, No. 2113, dated Saturday, May 5, 1894.

In April 1895, the owners of the rival The Cumberland Argus and Fruitgrowers' Advocate (also known as The Cumberland Argus) purchased The Cumberland Mercury, along with the Weekly Advance and River Times titles and the Fuller's Lightning Printing Works from Cyrus E. Fuller. All three titles were incorporated into The Cumberland Argus from issue Vol. VIII, no. 397, dated 4 May 1895.

== Availability ==
Hardcopy of the Weekly Advance is available from 5 February 1892 to 27 January 1893. These issues are held by the State Library of New South Wales in offsite storage.

Gosford Micrographics Pty Ltd filmed the available issues of the Weekly Advance into a single reel of microfilm in August 1993. This microfilm can be viewed at the State Library of New South Wales, the National Library of Australia and the library services at Cumberland and Parramatta Councils.

All available issues of the Weekly Advance are available on the National Library of Australia's Trove digital newspapers and more website.

== See also ==
- List of newspapers in Australia
- List of defunct newspapers of Australia
- List of newspapers in New South Wales
- The Cumberland Argus and Fruitgrowers' Advocate
