= Parramatta Sun =

Former regional newspaper

The Parramatta Sun was a weekly regional newspaper which served the communities of Parramatta and the former Holroyd local government areas in New South Wales, Australia. The newspaper was part of Fairfax Media Regional. The final edition of the newspaper was released in December 2017.

Its circulation was over 63,000 and readership over 78,000.
