= City of Holroyd =

Former local government area in New South Wales, Australia

- Local government area
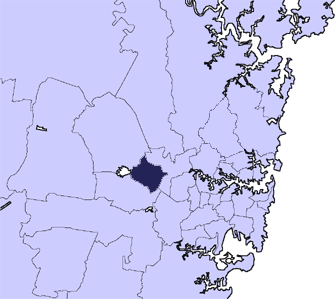
- Location in Metropolitan Sydney, 1872–2016

- Coordinates: 33°50′S 150°59′E
- Country: Australia
- State: New South Wales
- Region: Western Sydney
- Established: 5 July 1872 (Prospect and Sherwood); 11 January 1927 (Holroyd); 1 January 1991 (City)
- Abolished: 12 May 2016
- Council seat: Administration Centre, Merrylands

Area
  - Total: 40 km^{2} (15 sq mi)

Population
  - Total: 99,163 (2011 census)
  - Density: 2,480.3/km^{2} (6,424/sq mi)
- Parish: Prospect; St John
- Website: City of Holroyd
LGAs around City of Holroyd
| Blacktown | Parramatta | Parramatta |
| Blacktown | City of Holroyd | Parramatta |
| Fairfield | Fairfield | Parramatta |

The City of Holroyd was a local government area in the western suburbs of Sydney, in the state of New South Wales, Australia. First proclaimed in July 1872 as the "Municipal District of Prospect and Sherwood", it became the "Municipality of Prospect and Sherwood" from 1906 and in 1927 it was renamed the "Municipality of Holroyd" after Arthur Holroyd, the first mayor. From 1 January 1991, city status was granted, becoming the Holroyd City Council. The administrative centre of the City was located in the suburb of Merrylands, located approximately 25 kilometres (16 mi) west of the Sydney central business district.

The final mayor of the Holroyd City Council was Councillor Greg Cummings, a member of the Labor Party. On 12 May 2016, the majority of Holroyd City Council merged into the newly formed Cumberland Council, with a small northern section merged into the newly re-formed City of Parramatta Council.

== Council history ==
First proclaimed in July 1872 as the Municipal District of Prospect and Sherwood. The first council, consisting of six aldermen at-large, was elected on 30 August 1872. The council became the Municipality of Prospect and Sherwood from 1906 and on 11 January 1927 it was renamed the Municipality of Holroyd after Arthur Holroyd, the first mayor. From 1 January 1991, city status was granted, becoming the Holroyd City Council. Originally located at the Council Chambers in Merrylands West from 1915, the administrative centre of Holroyd was located in the suburb of Merrylands from 1962. The Holroyd Administration Centre was officially opened by the Premier of New South Wales, Bob Heffron, on 19 June 1962.

=== Council amalgamation ===
A 2015 review of local government boundaries by the NSW Government Independent Pricing and Regulatory Tribunal recommended that Holroyd merge with adjoining councils. The government considered two proposals. The first proposed a merger of parts of Auburn, Holroyd and Parramatta to form a new council with an area of 72 square kilometres (28 sq mi) and support a population of approximately 219,000.

The second proposed a merger of parts of Parramatta, Auburn, The Hills Shire, Hornsby Shire, and a small section of Holroyd (in the suburb of Holroyd) to form a new council with an area of 82 square kilometres (32 sq mi) and support a population of approximately 215,725.

On 12 May 2016, Holroyd City Council, along with parts of the Auburn (South of the M4 Western Motorway) and the Parramatta (Woodville Ward) city councils merged to form Cumberland Council, with a smaller minority in the suburbs of Holroyd, Westmead, Mays Hill and Parramatta becoming part of the new City of Parramatta Council.

== Suburbs in the local government area ==
Suburbs in the former City of Holroyd were:

- Fairfield (Parts within City of Fairfield)
- Girraween
- Granville (Parts within City of Parramatta and City of Auburn)
- Greystanes
- Guildford
- Guildford West
- Holroyd
- Harris Park (Parts within City of Parramatta)
- Mays Hill
- Merrylands
- Merrylands West
- Parramatta (Parts within City of Parramatta)
- Pemulwuy
- Pendle Hill
- Smithfield (Parts within City of Fairfield)
- South Wentworthville
- Toongabbie
- Wentworthville
- Westmead
- Woodpark
- Yennora

== Demographics ==
At the 2011 Census, there were 99,163 people in the Holroyd local government area, of these 49.5% were male and 50.5% were female. Aboriginal and Torres Strait Islander people made up 0.8% of the population. The median age of people in the City of Holroyd was 34 years. Children aged 0 – 14 years made up 20.9% of the population and people aged 65 years and over made up 12.1% of the population. Of people in the area aged 15 years and over, 53.2% were married and 10.3% were either divorced or separated.

Population growth in the City of Holroyd between the 2001 Census and the 2006 Census was 5.28%; and in the subsequent five years to the 2011 Census, population growth was 10.47%. When compared with total population growth of Australia for the same periods, being 5.78% and 8.32% respectively, population growth in Holroyd local government area was 20% higher than the national average. The median weekly income for residents within the City of Holroyd was generally on par with the national average.

At the 2011 Census, the proportion of residents in the Holroyd local government area who stated their ancestry as Lebanese, was in excess of sixteen times the national average; and the proportion of Indian residents was in excess of five times the national average. The proportion of residents who stated a religious affiliation with Islam or Hinduism was in excess of eight times and seven times the national average respectively; and the proportion of residents with no religion more than half the national average. Meanwhile, as at the Census date, the area was linguistically diverse, with Arabic, Tamil, or Hindi languages spoken in a high proportion of households, and ranged from five times to seventeen times the national averages.

Selected historical census data for Holroyd local government area
| Census year | | 2001 | 2006 | 2011 |
|---|---|---|---|---|
| Population | Estimated residents on Census night | 85,261 | 89,766 | 99,163 |
| Population | LGA rank in terms of size within New South Wales | | | |
| Population | % of New South Wales population | | | 1.43% |
| Population | % of Australian population | 0.45% | 0.45% | ▲0.46% |
| Cultural and language diversity | | | | |
| Ancestry, top responses | Australian | 23.3% | ▼21.8% | ▼17.2% |
| Ancestry, top responses | English | 19.7% | ▼16.1% | ▼14.7% |
| Ancestry, top responses | Lebanese | 11.5% | ▼11.1% | ▼9.7% |
| Ancestry, top responses | Indian | 3.3% | ▲5.5% | ▲9.2% |
| Ancestry, top responses | Chinese | 5.2% | ▲5.6% | ▲6.0% |
| Language, top responses (other than English) | Arabic | 10.7% | ▲12.4% | ▲12.5% |
| Language, top responses (other than English) | Tamil | 1.3% | ▲2.4% | ▲3.4% |
| Language, top responses (other than English) | Hindi | 1.6% | ▲2.0% | ▲2.9% |
| Language, top responses (other than English) | Mandarin | 1.7% | ▲2.1% | ▲2.5% |
| Language, top responses (other than English) | Cantonese | 2.4% | ▲2.5% | ▼2.4% |
| Religious affiliation | | | | |
| Religious affiliation, top responses | Catholic | 40.2% | ▼33.9% | ▼30.5% |
| Religious affiliation, top responses | Islam | 6.2% | ▲8.3% | ▲10.4% |
| Religious affiliation, top responses | Hinduism | 3.1% | ▲5.7% | ▲10.0% |
| Religious affiliation, top responses | Anglican | 15.2% | ▼12.1% | ▼9.6% |
| Religious affiliation, top responses | No Religion | 7.3% | ▲8.1% | ▲8.4% |
| Median weekly incomes | | | | |
| Personal income | Median weekly personal income | | A$431 | A$517 |
| Personal income | % of Australian median income | | 92.5% | 89.6% |
| Family income | Median weekly family income | | A$998 | A$1,353 |
| Family income | % of Australian median income | | 97.2% | 91.4% |
| Household income | Median weekly household income | | A$1,121 | A$1,209 |
| Household income | % of Australian median income | | 95.7% | 98.0% |

== Council ==
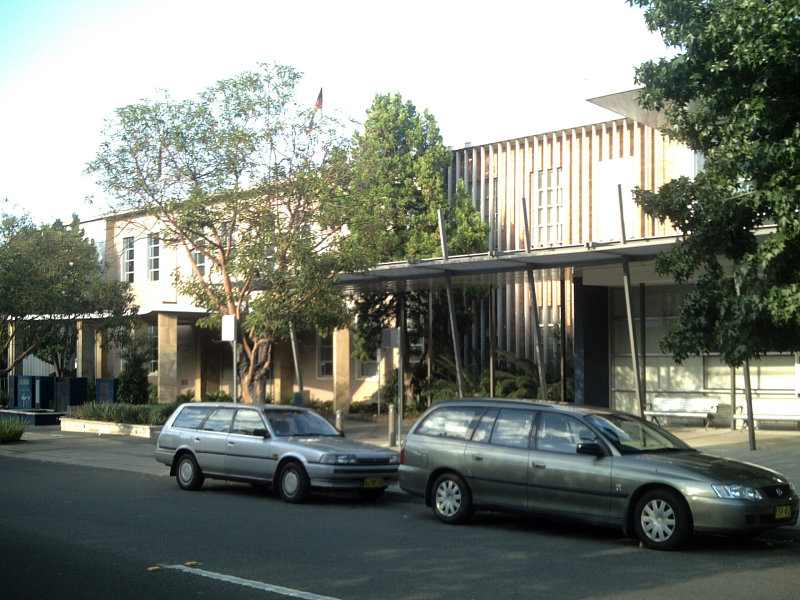
The Council Chambers in Merrylands, seat of the council from 1962 to 2016.

=== Final composition and election method ===
Holroyd City Council was composed of twelve councillors elected proportionally as four separate wards, each electing three councillors. All councillors were elected for a fixed four-year term of office. The mayor and deputy mayor were elected annually by the councillors at the first meeting of the council. The last election was held on 8 September 2012, and the final makeup of the council for the term 2012–2016 was as follows:

| Ward | Councillor | Party | Notes |
|---|---|---|---|
| East Ward | Peter Monaghan | Labor | |
| East Ward | Michael Zaiter | Liberal | Elected to Cumberland Wentworthville Ward, 2017. |
| East Ward | Eddy Sarkis | Independents | Elected to Cumberland Greystanes Ward, 2017. |
| North Ward | Joseph Rahme | Liberal | Elected to Cumberland Granville Ward, 2017. |
| North Ward | Lisa Lake | Labor | Elected to Cumberland Wentworthville Ward, 2017. |
| North Ward | Muriel Yvette Whitfield | Holroyd Independents | Deputy Mayor 2013–2015 |
| South Ward | Nasr Kafrouni | Liberal | Mayor 2013–2014 |
| South Ward | John Brodie | Holroyd Independents | Deputy Mayor 2012–2013 |
| South Ward | Pam Colman | Labor | Deputy Mayor 2011–2012 |
| West Ward | Ross Grove | Liberal | Mayor 2012–2013 |
| West Ward | Greg Cummings | Labor | Mayor 2014–2016; Elected to Cumberland Greystanes Ward, 2017. |
| West Ward | Nadima Kafrouni | Liberal | Deputy Mayor 2015–2016 |

=== Mayors ===
| Mayor | Party | Term | Notes |
|---|---|---|---|
| Arthur Holroyd | Independent | 3 September 1872 – 9 February 1875 | |
| John Good | Independent | 9 February 1875 – 21 July 1875 | |
| Henry Tucker Jones | Independent | 22 July 1875 – 19 February 1876 | |
| Gilbert Hunter Smith | Independent | 19 February 1876 – 13 February 1878 | |
| Joseph Booth | Independent | 13 February 1878 – 14 February 1879 | |
| John William Pass | Independent | 14 February 1879 – 13 February 1880 | |
| John Booth | Independent | 13 February 1880 – 20 February 1888 | |
| Henry Tucker Jones | Independent | 20 February 1888 – 23 February 1889 | |
| Thomas Muston | Independent | 23 February 1889 – 4 February 1892 | |
| George McCredie | Independent | 4 February 1892 – 20 February 1895 | |
| William P. Noller | Independent | 20 February 1895 – 9 February 1897 | |
| Thomas Muston | Independent | 9 February 1897 – 15 February 1899 | |
| Henry Tucker Jones | Independent | 15 February 1899 – 15 February 1900 | |
| Edward Pascoe Pearce | Independent | 15 February 1900 – 9 February 1901 | |
| Henry Tucker Jones | Independent | 9 February 1901 – 19 February 1903 | |
| Hugh Miller | Independent | 19 February 1903 – 15 February 1905 | |
| Charles Shepherd | Independent | 15 February 1905 – 17 February 1906 | |
| Herbert Soames | Independent | 17 February 1906 – 19 February 1907 | |
| Peter Antony Pavesi | Independent | 19 February 1907 – 11 February 1908 | |
| Benjamin Crowe | Independent | 11 February 1908 – 8 February 1909 | |
| William Freame | Independent | 8 February 1909 – 14 February 1910 | |
| George Ringrose | Independent | 14 February 1910 – 12 February 1912 | |
| Ludovic George Houston McCredie | Independent | 12 February 1912 – 13 February 1914 | |
| George William Brewer | Independent | 13 February 1914 – 19 February 1915 | |
| John Kelly | Independent | 19 February 1915 – 18 February 1916 | |
| Robert Donnelly | Independent | 18 February 1916 – 6 July 1917 | |
| Frederick George Tucker Jones | Independent | 6 July 1917 – 20 December 1921 | |
| John Hamilton Shaw | Independent | 20 December 1921 – 5 December 1922 | |
| John Arthur Williams | Independent | 5 December 1922 – 4 December 1923 | |
| Archibald John Webb | Independent | 4 December 1923 – 6 December 1928 | |
| John Spencer Bowman Bacon | Independent | 6 December 1928 – 10 December 1929 | |
| William Alfred Rainbow | Independent | 10 December 1929 – 9 December 1930 | |
| Frederick George Tucker Jones | Independent | 9 December 1930 – 5 January 1932 | |
| George Ernest Maunder | Independent | 5 January 1932 – 6 December 1932 | |
| William Campbell | Independent | 6 December 1932 – 5 December 1933 | |
| George Ernest Maunder | Independent | 5 December 1933 – 4 December 1934 | |
| Matthew Warnock | Independent | 4 December 1934 – 8 December 1936 | |
| Frederick George Tucker Jones | Independent | 8 December 1936 – 7 December 1937 | |
| William Campbell | Independent | 7 December 1937 – 12 December 1939 | |
| John Bennett Thorburn | Independent | 12 December 1939 – 16 September 1941 | |
| George Ernest Maunder | Independent | 16 September 1941 – 22 December 1947 | |
| William Campbell | Independent | 22 December 1947 – 2 December 1950 | |
| George Ernest Maunder | Independent | 12 December 1950 – 13 December 1955 | |
| Montague James Bennett MBE | Independent | 13 December 1955 – 10 July 1967 | |
| Bob Devlin OAM | Independent | 13 July 1967 – 24 September 1983 | |
| Henry Lionel Maley OAM | Independent | 4 October 1983 – 25 September 1984 | |
| Keith Matthew Warnock OAM | Independent | 25 September 1984 – 17 September 1985 | |
| Allan Gordon Ezzy | Independent | 17 September 1985 – 20 September 1988 | |
| Graham Gard OAM | Independent | 20 September 1988 – 18 September 1990 | |
| Bob Downing | Independent | 18 September 1990 – 24 September 1991 | |
| Allan Gordon Ezzy | Independent | 24 September 1991 – 20 September 1994 | |
| Stuart Graham | | 20 September 1994 – 16 September 1997 | |
| Allan Gordon Ezzy | Independent | 16 September 1997 – 21 September 1999 | |
| Peter Herlinger | Labor | 21 September 1999 – 21 September 2000 | |
| Andrew Pigram | Independent | 21 September 2000 – 17 September 2002 | |
| Malcolm Tulloch | Labor | 17 September 2002 – 13 April 2004 | |
| Dr. John Brodie | Holroyd Independents | 13 April 2004 – 20 September 2005 | |
| Allan Gordon Ezzy AM APM | Holroyd Independents | 20 September 2005 – 19 September 2006 | |
| Dr. John Brodie | Holroyd Independents | 19 September 2006 – 30 September 2008 | |
| Greg Cummings | Labor | 30 September 2008 – 15 September 2009 | |
| John Frederick Perry | Holroyd Independents | 15 September 2009 – 21 September 2010 | |
| Peter Monaghan | Labor | 21 September 2010 – 20 September 2011 | |
| Yvette Whitfield | Holroyd Independents | 20 September 2011 – September 2012 | |
| Ross Grove | Liberal | September 2012 – September 2013 | |
| Nasr Kafrouni | Liberal | September 2013 – 16 September 2014 | |
| Greg Cummings | Labor | 16 September 2014 – 12 May 2016 | |

=== Town Clerk/General Manager ===
The Local Government Act, 1993 removed the requirement that the administrative head of a council be a "Town or Shire Clerk" and specified that the head was to be known as the "General Manager".

| Town Clerk/General Manager | Term | Notes |
|---|---|---|
| William Alfred Brodie | 2 October 1872 – 15 March 1873 | |
| George Edward Young | 15 March 1873 – 16 September 1873 | |
| Richard Amos | 16 September 1873 – 3 November 1874 | |
| George W. Bowden | 3 November 1874 – 1 May 1875 | |
| George Edward Young (acting) | 1 May 1875 – 5 February 1876 | |
| John Bergan (acting) | 5 February 1876 – 1877 | |
| James Chisholm | 1877 – November 1879 | |
| Emma K. Chisholm | 3 December 1879 – June 1884 | |
| John Overton | June 1884 – 11 July 1884 | |
| Joseph John Drew | 11 July 1884 – 30 October 1885 | |
| Daniel Watsford | 30 October 1885 – 15 May 1886 | |
| Arthur Philip McManis | 15 May 1886 – 1 November 1888 | |
| George Edward Young | 1 November 1888 – 17 August 1891 | |
| Arthur Philip McManis | 17 August 1891 – 1 July 1908 | |
| Joseph Orton Miller | 1 July 1908 – March 1909 | |
| Arthur J. Williamson | March 1909 – 8 July 1914 | |
| George M. Shaw | 8 July 1914 – 25 April 1917 | |
| E. W. E. Kelly (acting) | 25 April 1917 – 16 June 1917 | |
| A. D. Hume | 16 June 1917 – 2 April 1939 | |
| A. E. Bavington | 2 April 1939 – 3 December 1946 | |
| Philip Arthur Arnett MBE | 3 December 1946 – 31 December 1970 | |
| Colin H. Kennedy | 1 January 1971 – 1973 | |
| Ivan R. Wilson | 1973 – 1988 | |
| Graham R. Towle | 1988 – 1992 | |
| Dennis Trezise | 1992 – 2007 | |
| Merv Ismay | 2007 – 12 May 2016 | Cumberland Council GM, 2016 |
