= List of mayors of Holroyd =

People who served as the mayor of the City of Holroyd, in the state of New South Wales, Australia, including its former title as the mayor of Prospect and Sherwood are:

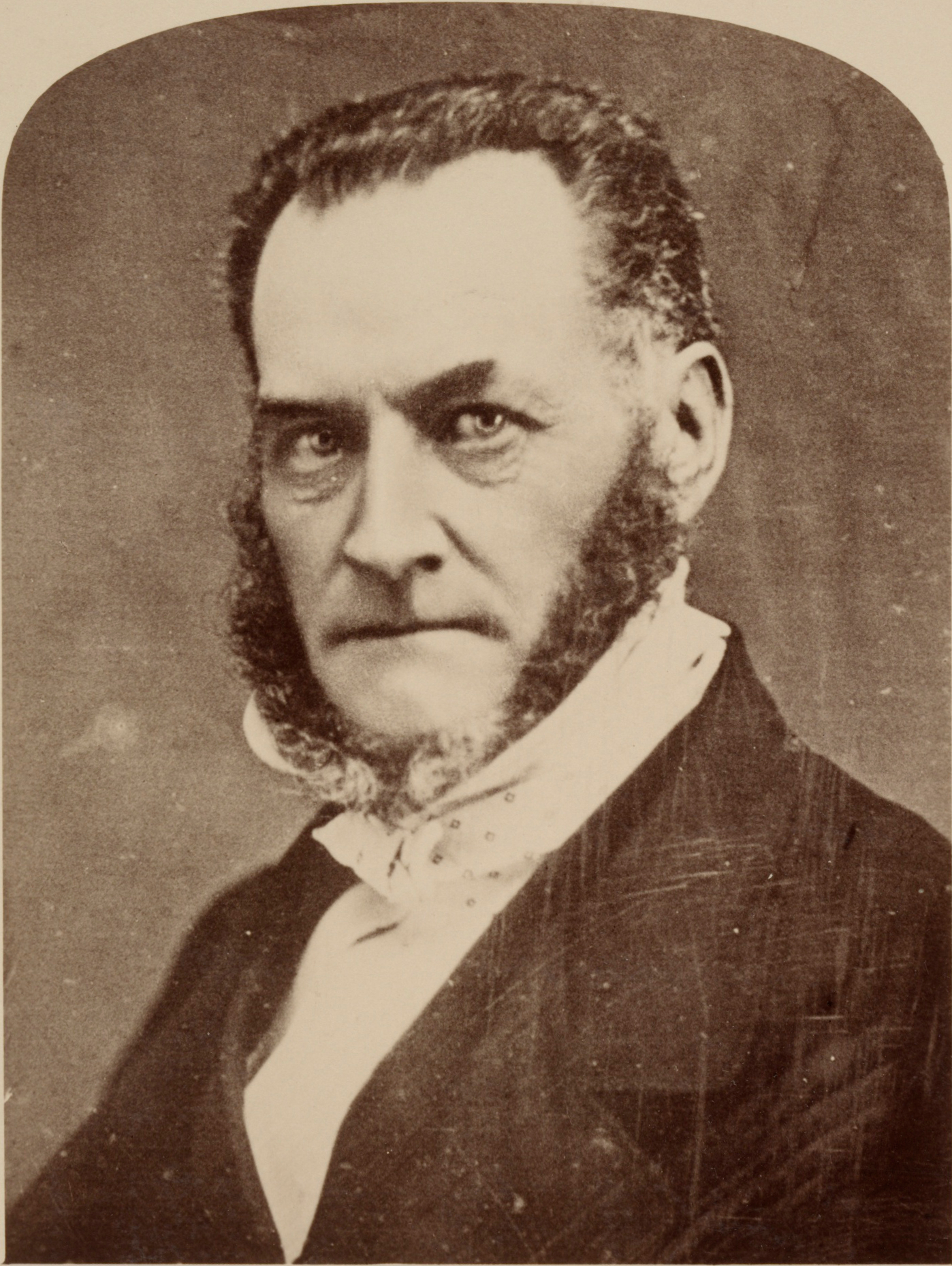
Arthur Holroyd, mayor 1872–1875

Mayor	Party	Term	Notes
Arthur Holroyd	Independent	3 September 1872 – 9 February 1875	
John Good	Independent	9 February 1875 – 21 July 1875	
Henry Tucker Jones	Independent	22 July 1875 – 19 February 1876	
Gilbert Hunter Smith	Independent	19 February 1876 – 13 February 1878	
Joseph Booth	Independent	13 February 1878 – 14 February 1879	
John William Pass	Independent	14 February 1879 – 13 February 1880	
John Booth	Independent	13 February 1880 – 20 February 1888	
Henry Tucker Jones	Independent	20 February 1888 – 23 February 1889	
Thomas Muston	Independent	23 February 1889 – 4 February 1892	
George McCredie	Independent	4 February 1892 – 20 February 1895	
William P. Noller	Independent	20 February 1895 – 9 February 1897	
Thomas Muston	Independent	9 February 1897 – 15 February 1899	
Henry Tucker Jones	Independent	15 February 1899 – 15 February 1900	
Edward Pascoe Pearce	Independent	15 February 1900 – 9 February 1901	
Henry Tucker Jones	Independent	9 February 1901 – 19 February 1903	
Hugh Miller	Independent	19 February 1903 – 15 February 1905	
Charles Shepherd	Independent	15 February 1905 – 17 February 1906	
Herbert Soames	Independent	17 February 1906 – 19 February 1907	
Peter Antony Pavesi	Independent	19 February 1907 – 11 February 1908	
Benjamin Crowe	Independent	11 February 1908 – 8 February 1909	
William Freame	Independent	8 February 1909 – 14 February 1910	
George Ringrose	Independent	14 February 1910 – 12 February 1912	
Ludovic George Houston McCredie	Independent	12 February 1912 – 13 February 1914	
George William Brewer	Independent	13 February 1914 – 19 February 1915	
John Kelly	Independent	19 February 1915 – 18 February 1916	
Robert Donnelly	Independent	18 February 1916 – 6 July 1917	
Frederick George Tucker Jones	Independent	6 July 1917 – 20 December 1921	
John Hamilton Shaw	Independent	20 December 1921 – 5 December 1922	
John Arthur Williams	Independent	5 December 1922 – 4 December 1923	
Archibald John Webb	Independent	4 December 1923 – 6 December 1928	
John Spencer Bowman Bacon	Independent	6 December 1928 – 10 December 1929	
William Alfred Rainbow	Independent	10 December 1929 – 9 December 1930	
Frederick George Tucker Jones	Independent	9 December 1930 – 5 January 1932	
George Ernest Maunder	Independent	5 January 1932 – 6 December 1932	
William Campbell	Independent	6 December 1932 – 5 December 1933	
George Ernest Maunder	Independent	5 December 1933 – 4 December 1934	
Matthew Warnock	Independent	4 December 1934 – 8 December 1936	
Frederick George Tucker Jones	Independent	8 December 1936 – 7 December 1937	
William Campbell	Independent	7 December 1937 – 12 December 1939	
John Bennett Thorburn	Independent	12 December 1939 – 16 September 1941	
George Ernest Maunder	Independent	16 September 1941 – 22 December 1947	
William Campbell	Independent	22 December 1947 – 2 December 1950	
George Ernest Maunder	Independent	12 December 1950 – 13 December 1955	
Montague James Bennett MBE	Independent	13 December 1955 – 10 July 1967	
Bob Devlin OAM	Independent	13 July 1967 – 24 September 1983	
Henry Lionel Maley OAM	Independent	4 October 1983 – 25 September 1984	
Keith Matthew Warnock OAM	Independent	25 September 1984 – 17 September 1985	
Allan Gordon Ezzy	Independent	17 September 1985 – 20 September 1988	
Graham Gard OAM	Independent	20 September 1988 – 18 September 1990	
Bob Downing	Independent	18 September 1990 – 24 September 1991	
Allan Gordon Ezzy	Independent	24 September 1991 – 20 September 1994	
Stuart Graham		20 September 1994 – 16 September 1997	
Allan Gordon Ezzy	Independent	16 September 1997 – 21 September 1999	
Peter Herlinger	Labor	21 September 1999 – 21 September 2000	
Andrew Pigram	Independent	21 September 2000 – 17 September 2002	
Malcolm Tulloch	Labor	17 September 2002 – 13 April 2004	
Dr. John Brodie	Holroyd Independents	13 April 2004 – 20 September 2005	
Allan Gordon Ezzy AM APM	Holroyd Independents	20 September 2005 – 19 September 2006	
Dr. John Brodie	Holroyd Independents	19 September 2006 – 30 September 2008	
Greg Cummings	Labor	30 September 2008 – 15 September 2009	
John Frederick Perry	Holroyd Independents	15 September 2009 – 21 September 2010	
Peter Monaghan	Labor	21 September 2010 – 20 September 2011	
Yvette Whitfield	Holroyd Independents	20 September 2011 – September 2012	
Ross Grove	Liberal	September 2012 – September 2013	
Nasr Kafrouni	Liberal	September 2013 – 16 September 2014	
Greg Cummings	Labor	16 September 2014 – 12 May 2016	
