= Guildford West =

- Suburb
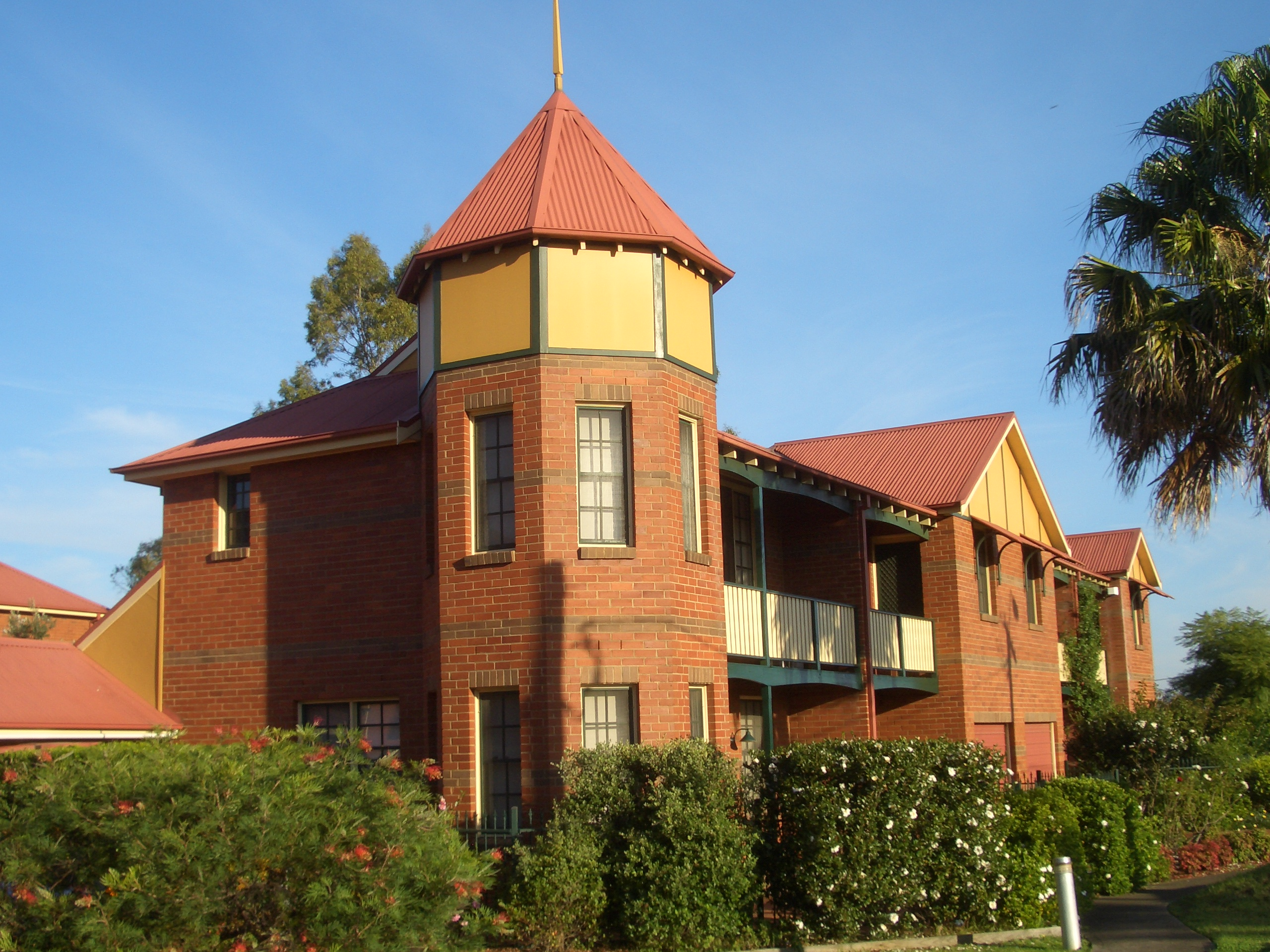
- Fowler Road townhouses

- Interactive map of Guildford West
- Country: Australia
- State: New South Wales
- City: Sydney
- LGA: Cumberland City Council
- Location: 26 km (16 mi) west of Sydney CBD

Government
  - State electorate: Fairfield
  - Federal division: Blaxland

Population
  - Total: 5,762 (SAL 2021)
- Postcode: 2161
Suburbs around Guildford West
Woodpark	Merrylands West	Merrylands
Smithfield	Guildford West	Guildford
Fairfield	Yennora	Old Guildford

Guildford West is a suburb of Sydney, in the state of New South Wales, Australia. It is located 26 kilometres west of the Sydney central business district, in the local government area of the Cumberland City Council and is part of the Greater Western Sydney region. Guildford West shares the postcode of 2161 with the separate suburbs of Guildford and Old Guildford.

== Education ==
Guildford West Public School and as well as a number of preschools are situated within Guildford West. Although not in the suburb, Fairfield High School and Merrylands High School are in close vicinity to the suburb, depending on the residential area.

== Recreational areas ==
The suburb features large sports grounds such as Guildford West Sportsground and Guildford Tennis Centre. There are number of small suburban parks with playgrounds and sports fields as well throughout the suburb.

== Population ==
At the 2021 census, there were 5,762 residents in Guildford West. The median age of residents was 31 years and 24.8% of people were aged 14 years and under. 55.5% of people were born in Australia. The next most common countries of birth were Lebanon 8.1%, Afghanistan 3.6%, Iraq 3.3%, Pakistan 1.8% and Syria 1.7%. 37.1% of people spoke only English at home. Other languages spoken at home included Arabic 28.8%, Hazaraghi 2.9%, Mandarin 2.3%, Persian 1.9% and Turkish 1.7%.

The top responses for religious affiliation were Islam 31.5%, Catholic 26.8%, No Religion 11.0% and Anglican 4.9%.

== Commercial area ==
Although small in size, Fairfield Road and Fowler Road act as the suburb's 'main streets' with a few restaurants, convenient stores, a post office and various shops. Fairfield town centre, which features a shopping mall, and the Guildford main street in Guildford Road are equidistant to the residential area of Guildford West, with some areas being more adjacent to the Fairfield town centre, which can be accessed from Fairfield Road, a street which features a few industrial facilities.

== Transport ==
Yennora railway station and Fairfield railway station are proximate to large swathes of the suburb.
