= Division of Blaxland =

Australian federal electoral division

Coordinates: 33.888°S 151.000°E

Blaxland Australian House of Representatives Division
- Interactive map of electorate boundaries from the 2025 federal election
- Created: 1949
- MP: Jason Clare
- Party: Labor
- Namesake: Gregory Blaxland
- Electors: 116,745 (2025)
- Area: 59 km^{2} (22.8 sq mi)
- Demographic: Inner metropolitan
Electorates around Blaxland:
McMahon	Parramatta	Parramatta
McMahon	Blaxland	Reid
Fowler	Watson	Watson

The Division of Blaxland is an Australian electoral division in the state of New South Wales.

It covers 59 square kilometres (23 sq mi) of Labor heartland in the Canterbury Bankstown, Cumberland, Fairfield, Parramatta and Strathfield areas in Sydney's west. It stretches south from the M4 Motorway at Parramatta to the Hume Highway in western Yagoona. The Labor Party has continuously held the seat since its inception in 1949.

Since 2007 the MP for Blaxland has been Jason Clare, who has served as Minister for Education under Prime Minister Anthony Albanese since 2022. From 1969 to 1996, the seat was held by Paul Keating, who served as Prime Minister of Australia from 1991 to 1996.

Blaxland is an ethnically diverse and multicultural electorate, with Australia's second highest population of Muslims after neighbouring Watson and the highest share of non-English speakers. As of 2021, 20% of electors speak Arabic at home.

== History ==
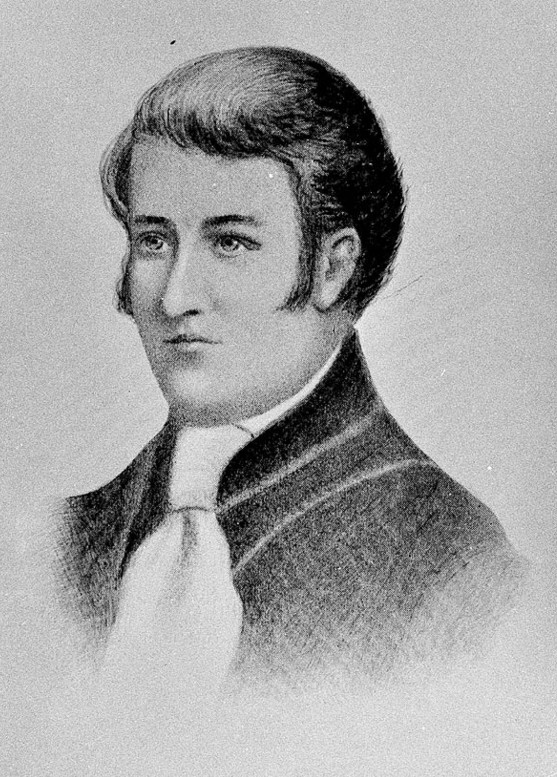
Gregory Blaxland, the division's namesake

The division was created in 1949 and is named after Gregory Blaxland, a farmer and an early Australian explorer of the Blue Mountains in New South Wales. The division has been a comfortably safe seat for Labor since its creation; western Sydney has been a Labor heartland for over a century. Initially created as a notional Lang Labor seat, the official ALP narrowly won it over former NSW Premier Jack Lang. This is the only election at which (official) Labor has won less than 56 percent of the two-party vote, as well as the only one in which it did not win an outright majority on the first count.

Its most notable member has been Paul Keating, who was Prime Minister of Australia from 1991 until 1996 after having previously served as Treasurer of Australia from 1983 until 1991. In 2007, Keating's successor, Michael Hatton, lost preselection for this seat to current member Jason Clare, who was a staffer for former New South Wales Premier Bob Carr.

In 2017 the division had the highest percentage of "No" responses in the Australian Marriage Law Postal Survey, with 73.9% of the electorate's respondents to the survey responding "No". The Survey had strong opposition from Muslim communities in the electorate.

== Geography ==
The division is based in the western suburbs of Sydney, including eastern Cumberland, northwestern Canterbury Bankstown and small parts of Parramatta and Strathfield local government areas. It includes the suburbs of Auburn, Berala, Birrong, Chester Hill, Guildford, Guildford West, Holroyd, Merrylands, Merrylands West, Potts Hill, Regents Park, Old Guildford, Rookwood, Sefton, South Granville, Woodpark and Yennora; as well as parts of Bass Hill, Clyde, Granville, Lidcombe, South Wentworthville, Strathfield, Villawood and Yagoona. It formerly included Bankstown, but it has drifted north and west at various redistributions.

Since 1984 federal electoral division boundaries in Australia have been determined at redistributions by a redistribution committee appointed by the Australian Electoral Commission. Redistributions occur for the boundaries of divisions in a particular state, and they occur every seven years, or sooner if a state's representation entitlement changes or when divisions of a state are malapportioned.

== Demographics ==
Blaxland is a socially conservative and historically working-class electorate which includes sizable immigrant populations from China, Vietnam, and the Middle East. It has one of the highest Muslim populations in Australia at 29.2%. According to the 2016 census, 20.1% of electors spoke Arabic at home, the highest percentage in Australia. The electorate remains an electoral stronghold for the centre-left Labor Party.

=== Cultural diversity ===
2021 Australian census
Ancestry
Response	Blaxland	NSW	Australia
Lebanese	15.0%	2.2%	1.0%
Chinese	13.6%	7.2%	5.5%
Australian	11.1%	28.6%	29.9%
Vietnamese	9.7%	1.5%	1.3%
English	8.8%	29.9%	33.0%
Country of birth
Response	Blaxland	NSW	Australia
Australia	42.9%	65.4%	66.9%
Vietnam	8.4%	1.2%	1.0%
China	6.6%	3.1%	2.2%
Lebanon	6.1%	0.8%	0.3%
Nepal	3.2%	0.8%	0.5%
Pakistan	2.1%	0.4%	0.4%
Religious affiliation
Response	Blaxland	NSW	Australia
Islam	31.7%	4.3%	3.2%
Catholic	17.0%	22.4%	20.0%
No religion	15.1%	32.8%	38.4%
Buddhism	7.8%	2.8%	2.4%
Language spoken at home
Response	Blaxland	NSW	Australia
English	24.3%	67.6%	72.0%
Arabic	20.0%	2.8%	1.4%
Vietnamese	10.0%	1.5%	1.3%
Mandarin	6.7%	3.4%	2.7%
Cantonese	4.2%	1.8%	1.2%
Urdu	3.3%	0.6%	0.4%

== Members ==
Image	Member	Party	Term	Notes
	Eli Harrison (1903–1976)	Labor	10 December 1949 – 29 September 1969	Previously a member of the New South Wales Legislative Council. Retired
	Paul Keating (1944–)	Labor	25 October 1969 – 23 April 1996	Served as minister under Whitlam and Hawke. Served as Deputy Prime Minister under Hawke. Served as Prime Minister from 1991 to 1996. Resigned to retire from politics
	Michael Hatton (1951–)	Labor	15 June 1996 – 17 October 2007	Lost preselection and retired
	Jason Clare (1972–)	Labor	24 November 2007 – present	Served as minister under Gillard and Rudd. Incumbent. Currently a minister under Albanese

== Election results ==
2025 Australian federal election: Blaxland
Party	Candidate	Votes	%	±%
Labor	Jason Clare	40,001	46.04	−5.52
Liberal	Courtney Nguyen	17,023	19.59	−7.58
Independent	Ahmed Ouf	16,302	18.76	+18.76
Greens	Omar Sakr	6,854	7.89	+1.07
One Nation	Mitchell Klievens	3,086	3.55	−0.90
Libertarian	Mike Luo	1,894	2.18	+1.08
Family First	Jennifer Di Girolamo	1,726	1.99	+1.99
Total formal votes		86,886	87.14	−1.32
Informal votes		12,822	12.86	+1.32
Turnout		99,708	85.43	+3.41
Two-party-preferred result
Labor	Jason Clare	62,474	71.90	+8.86
Liberal	Courtney Nguyen	24,412	28.10	−8.86
Labor hold		Swing	+8.86	

2022 Australian federal election: Blaxland
Party	Candidate	Votes	%	±%
Labor	Jason Clare	44,905	54.98	−2.80
Liberal	Oz Guney	22,059	27.01	−1.81
Greens	Linda Eisler	5,187	6.35	+0.99
United Australia	Elvis Sinosic	5,105	6.25	+3.37
One Nation	Adam Stepanoff	4,421	5.41	+5.41
Total formal votes		81,677	89.21	+2.51
Informal votes		9,884	10.79	−2.51
Turnout		91,561	85.37	−3.08
Two-party-preferred result
Labor	Jason Clare	53,039	64.94	+0.22
Liberal	Oz Guney	28,638	35.06	−0.22
Labor hold		Swing	+0.22	

Alluvial diagram for preference flows in the seat of Blaxland in the 2022 federal election. The winning candidate got over 50% of first preference votes, so this alluvial diagram is indicative only, and preference flows were not used to determine the final result. The preference flows were used to determine the two-candidate-preferred.
