= Merrylands West =

- Suburb
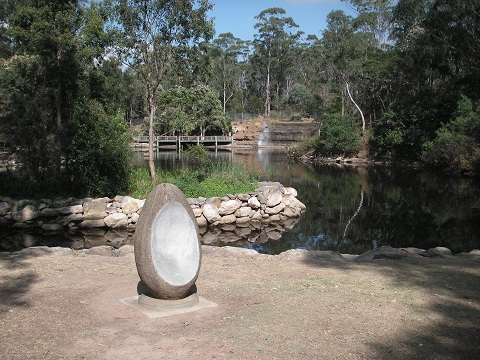
- Central Gardens

- Interactive map of Merrylands West
- Coordinates: 33°50′15″S 150°57′42″E
- Country: Australia
- State: New South Wales
- City: Sydney
- LGA: Cumberland City Council
- Location: 23 km (14 mi) west of Sydney CBD

Government
  - State electorate: Granville
  - Federal division: Blaxland
- Elevation: 42 m (138 ft)

Population
  - Total: 7,054 (2021 census)
- Postcode: 2160
Suburbs around Merrylands West
South Wentworthville	South Wentworthville	Westmead; Mays Hill
Greystanes Smithfield	Merrylands West	Merrylands
Woodpark	Guildford West	Guildford

Merrylands West is a suburb in western Sydney, New South Wales, Australia. It is located 23 kilometres west of the Sydney central business district in the local government area of the Cumberland City Council.

== Geography ==
The eastern part of Merrylands West is known locally as "Hilltop" due to the nearby school.

== Commercial area ==
There is a retirement community, Cardinal Gilroy Village, situated on 45 Barcom Street, behind Merrylands High School and Cerdon College. The suburb is commercially serviced by a small shopping centre comprising an IGA, a McDonald's, a KFC, and several other small businesses such as a kebab shop, hot chips shop and a locally owned Subway.

== Schools and parks ==
Merrylands West contains several schools – Merrylands High School, Cerdon College- an all-girls private school, as well as Hilltop Road and Sherwood Grange Public Schools. Merrylands west also contains parks such as Central Gardens Reserve Park a wildlife park that contains animals such as, Kangaroos, Birds and Geese. There is also another small park with a playground on Serpentine St, this park had hosted events such as 2023 Christmas.

== Transport ==
There are two T-way stops in Merrylands West – the Sherwood stop near the main intersection, and the Canal stop in front of the two high schools. The area is also serviced by other local bus companies such as Hopkinsons.
