= Frank Louat =

Australian lawyer

Frank Rutledge Louat QC (30 December 1901 – 26 January 1963) was an Australian barrister.

Born at Merrylands in Sydney to architect James Rutledge Louat and Mabel Frances Horton (née Busby), Frank attended Sydney Church of England Grammar School and the University of Sydney, receiving a Bachelor of Law in 1925 and a Doctorate of Law in 1933.

At the age of 21, he won election to the council of the Nationalist Party and won the Morven Nolan prize for political science in 1923. Admitted to the bar in 1925, Louat wrote for the Sydney Morning Herald, was joint honorary secretary of the local United Association of Great Britain and France branch, and published The Practice of the Supreme Court of New South Wales at Common Law in 1928.

Louat married divorcee Marian Julia Mackie (née Ellis-Oates) on 27 June 1931, although they divorced in 1937. Louat would marry another divorcee, Isobel Anne Wearne (née Hamilton). From his home at Potts Point, Louat became a writer for the Daily Telegraph and a commentator for the Australian Broadcasting Corporation.

As an executive member of the United Australia Party, he was one of four UAP candidates for Eden-Monaro, at the 1940 federal election. A frequent visitor to the High Court, where he often appeared in constitutional cases, Louat was the only practising doctor at the New South Wales Bar for many years. He was president of the Constitutional Association of New South Wales from 1940 to 1946 and spent much of World War II defending civil liberties and free speech.

In 1950, he was nominated as an observer for the 1950 referendum in the French territories in India by the Court of International Justice. He was appointed Queen's Counsel on 16 July 1952.

Louat died at Dijon of heart disease in 1963 while on holiday in France.
