= Mosese Fotuaika =

New Zealand rugby league footballer

Personal information
- Born: 25 March 1992 Gisborne, New Zealand
- Died: 28 February 2013 (aged 20) Merrylands, New South Wales, Australia

Playing information
- Height: 181 cm (5 ft 11 in)
- Weight: 104 kg (16 st 5 lb)
- Position: Prop
Club
Years	Team	Pld	T	G	FG	P
	Wests Tigers
- As of 25 August 2013
- Relatives: Moeaki Fotuaika (brother)

Mosese Fotuaika (25 March 1992 – 28 February 2013) was a New Zealand professional rugby league footballer who was contracted to the Wests Tigers in the National Rugby League. He primarily played prop. He was of Tongan and New Zealand Māori descent.

== Playing career ==
Mosese Fotuaika played his junior football for Keebra Park before being signed by the Wests Tigers. He played for the Tigers' NYC team in 2012.

In 2012, Fotuaika played in the Tigers' 2012 NYC Grand Final win over the Canberra Raiders. Mosese played a key role in Wests Tigers winning their inaugural NYC premiership in 2012 and was a full-time member of the Wests Tigers NRL squad for 2013.

== Death ==
On 28 February 2013, Fotuaika was found dead by his girlfriend, Shanice Alaiasa at his home in Merrylands in Greater Western Sydney. Police had been called to the home and they confirmed that they had found a man dead and his death was not being treated as suspicious. Hours earlier he had been at the Wests Tigers club Concord gym and he injured himself while bench pressing with friends and it is believed that Fotuaika suffered a badly-torn pectoral muscle while exerting himself hours before taking his own life.

== Personal life ==
Fotuaika was the brother of current NRL Gold Coast Titans player Moeaki Fotuaika.
