= Moeaki Fotuaika =

Tonga international rugby league footballer (b.1999)

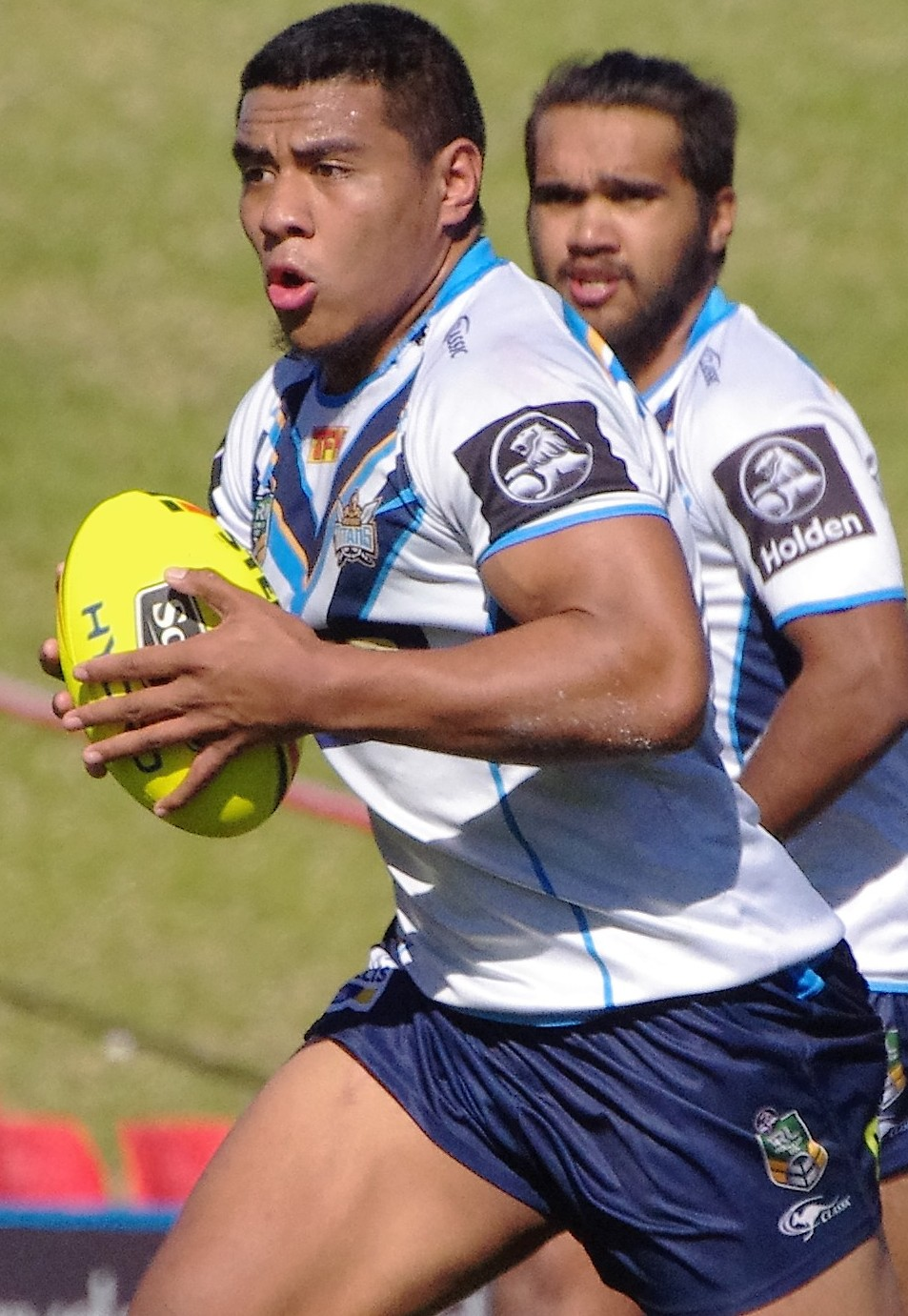

Personal information
- Born: 16 November 1999 (age 27) Gisborne, New Zealand
- Height: 185 cm (6 ft 1 in)
- Weight: 110 kg (17 st 5 lb)

Playing information
- Position: Prop
Club
Years	Team	Pld	T	G	FG	P
2018–	Gold Coast Titans	187	7	0	0	28
Representative
Years	Team	Pld	T	G	FG	P
2020–	Queensland	11	0	0	0	0
2022–26	Tonga	10	1	0	0	4
- Source: As of 20 November 2026
- Relatives: Mosese Fotuaika (brother)

Moeaki Fotuaika (born 16 November 1999) is a Tonga international rugby league footballer who plays as prop for the Gold Coast Titans in the National Rugby League (NRL).

He has played at representative level for Queensland in the State of Origin series.

As of round 12 2026, Fotuaika is the most capped Gold Coast Titans player.

== Background ==
Born in Gisborne, New Zealand, Fotuaika moved to Brisbane with his family in 2007 at age 7.

He played his junior rugby league for the Greenbank Raiders and attended Keebra Park State High School before being signed by the Gold Coast Titans.

== Playing career ==
=== Early career ===
In 2015, Fotuaika played for the Souths Logan Magpies in the Cyril Connell Cup.

In 2016, he moved up to the club's Mal Meninga Cup side.

In 2017, Fotuaika joined the Gold Coast Titans, playing for their under-20s side, winning the club's Under-20 Player of the Year award. On 6 May 2017, Fotuaika represented the Junior Kiwis against the Junior Kangaroos.

=== 2018 ===
On 11 January, Fotuaika re-signed with the Titans until the end of the 2021 season, joining the club's NRL squad. He began the season playing for the Tweed Heads Seagulls in the Queensland Cup.

In Round 9 of the 2018 NRL season, he made his NRL debut in the Titans' 18–32 loss to the Canberra Raiders. He played 16 games in his rookie season for the club, scoring two tries. On 19 September, he was selected in the Tonga 29-man squad for their Test match against Australia, but did not play.

=== 2019 ===
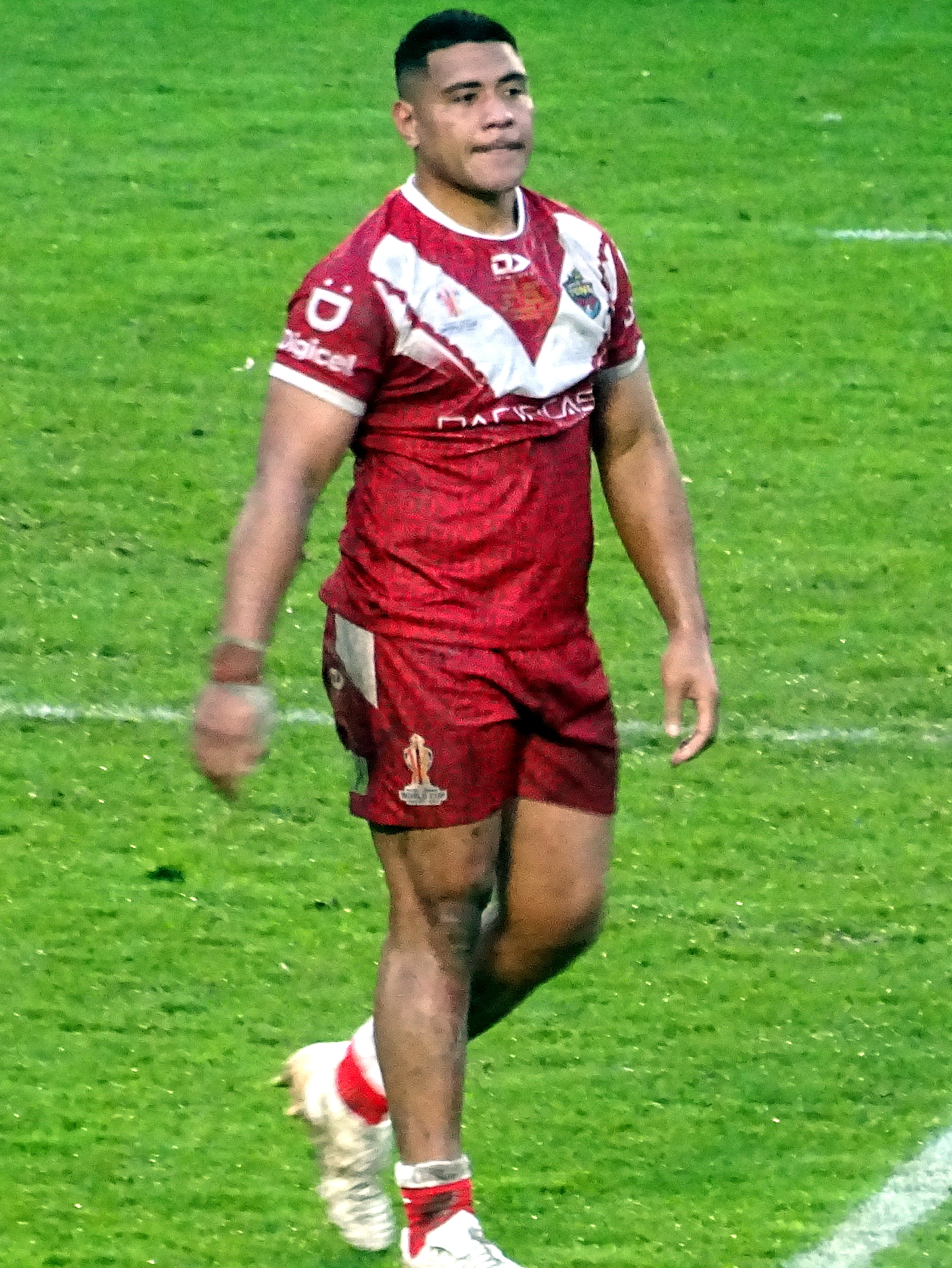
Fotuaika playing for Tonga at the 2021 RLWC

On 27 August, Fotuaika extended his contract with the Titans for one season, until the end of 2022. He played 21 games for the Titans before his season was cut short due to knee and wrist injuries.

On 13 September, Fotuaika won the Paul Broughton Medal for Titans' Player of the Year, becoming the youngest winner of the award.

=== 2020 ===
On 7 October, Fotuaika was named in Queensland's 27-man squad for the 2020 State of Origin series, Fotuaika would debut in Origin 2 of the series off the bench in the 34–10 loss, however Queensland would end up winning the series 2–1.

=== 2021 ===
He played 22 games for the Gold Coast in the 2021 NRL season including the club's elimination final loss against the Sydney Roosters.

=== 2022 ===
Fotuaika played a total of 23 games for the Gold Coast in the 2022 NRL season as the club finished 13th on the table.

In October 2022 he was named in the Tonga squad for the 2021 Rugby League World Cup.

=== 2023 ===
Fotuaika played two games for Queensland in the 2023 State of Origin series as they won the shield 2–1. In round 22 of the 2023 NRL season he was sent off for a high tackle on Charnze Nicoll-Klokstad. He played a total of 21 matches for the Gold Coast in the 2023 NRL season as the club finished 14th on the table.

=== 2024 ===
Fotuaika was named on the bench for Queensland for games one and two in the 2024 State of Origin series. In game three, he was starting prop. He played 20 games for the Gold Coast throughout the 2024 NRL season as the club finished 14th on the table.

=== 2025 ===
Fotuaika played 22 games for the Gold Coast in the 2025 NRL season as the club narrowly avoided the wooden spoon finishing 16th on the table.

=== 2026 ===
During Magic Round of the 2026 NRL season, Fotuaika equalled the Gold Coast's all-time game record of retired player Mark Minichiello, a record that stood for 12 years, Fotuaika was named for the Gold Coast round 12 match against Manly to surpass the record. He played over 20 matches for the Gold Coast in the 2026 NRL season as the club finished 16th on the table.

== Statistics ==
Year	Team	Games	Tries	Pts
2018	Gold Coast Titans	16	2	8
2019	Gold Coast Titans	21		
2020	Gold Coast Titans	18		
2021	Gold Coast Titans	22	3	12
2022	Gold Coast Titans	23		
2023	Gold Coast Titans	21		
2024	Gold Coast Titans	20		
2025	Gold Coast Titans	22	1	4
2026	Gold Coast Titans	20	1	4
2027	Gold Coast Titans			
	Totals	187	7	28

*denotes season still competing

== Personal life ==
Fotuaika's older brother Mosese, who was a member of the Wests Tigers NRL squad, committed suicide in 2013. Another older brother, Feao, plays for the Queensland Reds in Super Rugby.
