= Cerdon College =

Location
- Sherwood Road, Merrylands NSW; 33°50′18″S 150°58′06″E

Information
- Type: Catholic systemic, all girls, day school
- Motto: Latin: In Omnibus Christus (In All Things Christ)
- Denomination: Roman Catholic Church in Australia
- Established: 1960
- Principal: Lisa-Maree Browning
- Staff: 108 (2012)
- Enrolment: approximately 1250
- Colour: Royal blue
- Website: https://www.cerdonmerrylands.catholic.edu.au/

Cerdon College is a Roman Catholic secondary school for girls, located in Merrylands, a western suburb of Sydney, New South Wales, Australia.

== History ==
Established in 1960 by the Marist Sisters, the college was named after the town in France, the birthplace of the Marist Sisters. The Sisters' foundress, Jeanne-Marie Chavoin, is the patroness of the college.

In five decades, the number of students has risen from just 50 to over 1000 girls.

In 2021, Cerdon College ranked 86th in the HSC.

Marist heritage remains a central element of the teaching practices within Cerdon College, with the education of its students augmented by the traditions of the Marist Sisters.

== Notable alumni ==
- Dai Le, Member of the House of Representatives for Fowler, Australian Parliament
