= Woodpark, New South Wales =

Woodpark
- Suburb
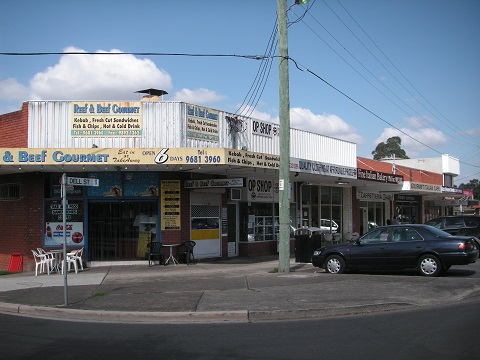
- Dell St shops

- Interactive map of Woodpark
- Coordinates: 33°50′31″S 150°57′45″E
- Country: Australia
- State: New South Wales
- City: Sydney
- LGA: Cumberland Council
- Location: 29 km (18 mi) west of Sydney CBD

Government
  - State electorate: Fairfield
  - Federal division: Blaxland

Population
  - Total: 1,706 (2021 census)
- Postcode: 2164
Suburbs around Woodpark
Greystanes	Merrylands West	Merrylands West
Smithfield	Woodpark	Guildford West
Smithfield	Smithfield	Guildford West

Woodpark is a suburb of Sydney, in the state of New South Wales, Australia. Woodpark is located 29 kilometres west of the Sydney central business district in the local government area of the Cumberland Council.

== Commercial area ==
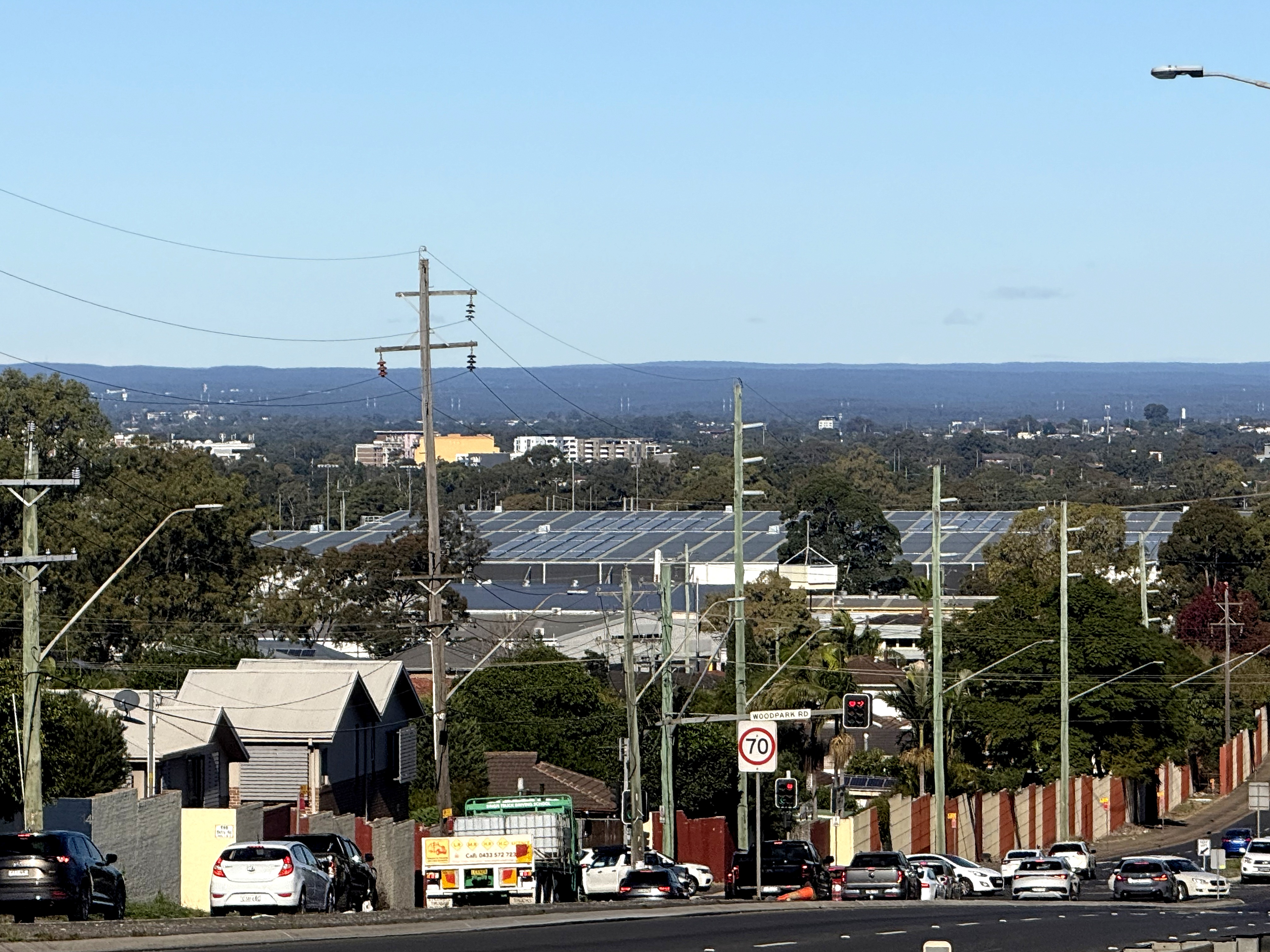
Cumberland Highway passing through the suburb, with Woodpark Road in view.

Woodpark is a small suburb located in Western Sydney. It contains a small row of cafes, bakeries and convenience stores near the main road (Dell Street), and two stops on the T-way bus system. There is a park across the road from the shops. The area had experienced growth in recent times due to award-winning cafes.

== Demographics ==
- The most common ancestries in Woodpark were Lebanese 24.1%, Australian 18.5%, English 15.5%, Italian 4.0% and Chinese 3.8%.
- 46.5% of people only spoke English at home. Other languages spoken at home included Arabic 23.9%, Hindi 2.7%, Turkish 1.8%, Mandarin 1.5% and Hazaraghi 1.3%.
- 59.9% of people were born in Australia. The most common countries of birth were Lebanon 7.1%, Iraq 2.6%, Afghanistan 2.3%, Fiji 2.2% and New Zealand 2.0%.
- The most common responses for religion were Catholic 39.7%, Islam 21.1%, No Religion 9.4%, Not stated 7.1% and Anglican 5.0%.
