= Mays Hill =

- Suburb
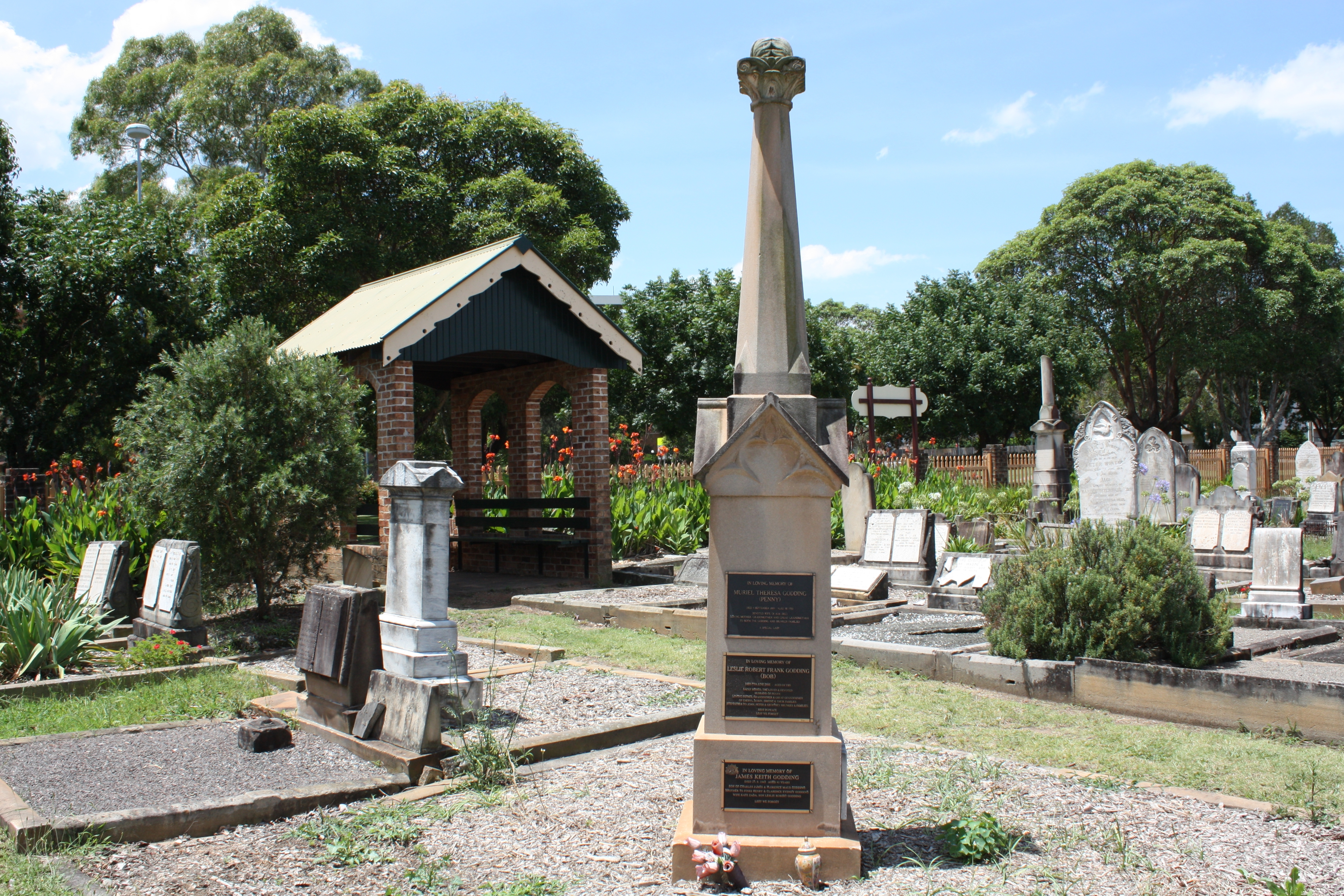
- Mays Hill Historic Cemetery

- Interactive map of Mays Hill
- Coordinates: 33°49′18″S 150°59′32″E
- Country: Australia
- State: New South Wales
- City: Sydney
- LGAs: Cumberland Council; City of Parramatta
- Location: 24 km (15 mi) west of Sydney CBD

Government
  - State electorates: Granville; Parramatta
  - Federal division: Parramatta
- Elevation: 40 m (130 ft)

Population
  - Total: 1,902 (2021 census)
- Postcode: 2145
Suburbs around Mays Hill
| Wentworthville | Westmead | Parramatta |
| Wentworthville | Mays Hill | Parramatta |
| South Wentworthville | Merrylands West | Merrylands |

Mays Hill is a suburb of Sydney, in the state of New South Wales, Australia. Mays Hill is located 24 kilometres west of the Sydney central business district, in the local government areas of the Cumberland Council and City of Parramatta, and is part of the Greater Western Sydney region.

Mays Hill has a stop on the T-80 T-Way bus service. It is also served by several CDC NSW bus routes.

== History ==
Originally some of the lands that is now Mays Hill was part of the governor's domain. This was subdivided and Thomas May was one of the purchasers.

Thomas May was a wealthy and influential businessman from Sydney. Although some believe Mays Hill derives its name from him, this is proven to be incorrect. A painting by George Edwards Peacock in 1840 shows the area was already known as Mays Hill, long before Thomas May's association with the Parramatta area began in 1859.

== Demographics ==
- The most common ancestries were Indian 28.1%, English 8.5%, Australian 7.7%, Chinese 6.6% and Lebanese 6.5%.
- 30.9% of people were born in Australia. The other most common countries of birth were India 31.8%, China (excludes SARs and Taiwan) 3.1%, Afghanistan 2.7%, Lebanon 2.6% and Pakistan 2.3%.
- 24.3% of people spoke only English at home. Other common responses for language included Hindi 8.6%, Arabic 7.3%, Tamil 6.6%, Telugu 5.9% and Gujarati 4.4%.
- The most common religions were Hinduism 33.4%, Catholic 16.8%, Islam 14.3%, No Religion 11.7% and Not stated 6.2%.

== Mays Hill Cemetery ==
Mays Hill Cemetery is one of four historic cemeteries in the City of Parramatta local government area and contains the graves of many well known local pioneering families including the Paytens, Fullagars, Houisons, Downs, Ardills and Mustons. This cemetery was originally known as Western Road Cemetery as it is located on the Great Western Highway.
