= Holroyd, New South Wales =

Holroyd
- Suburb
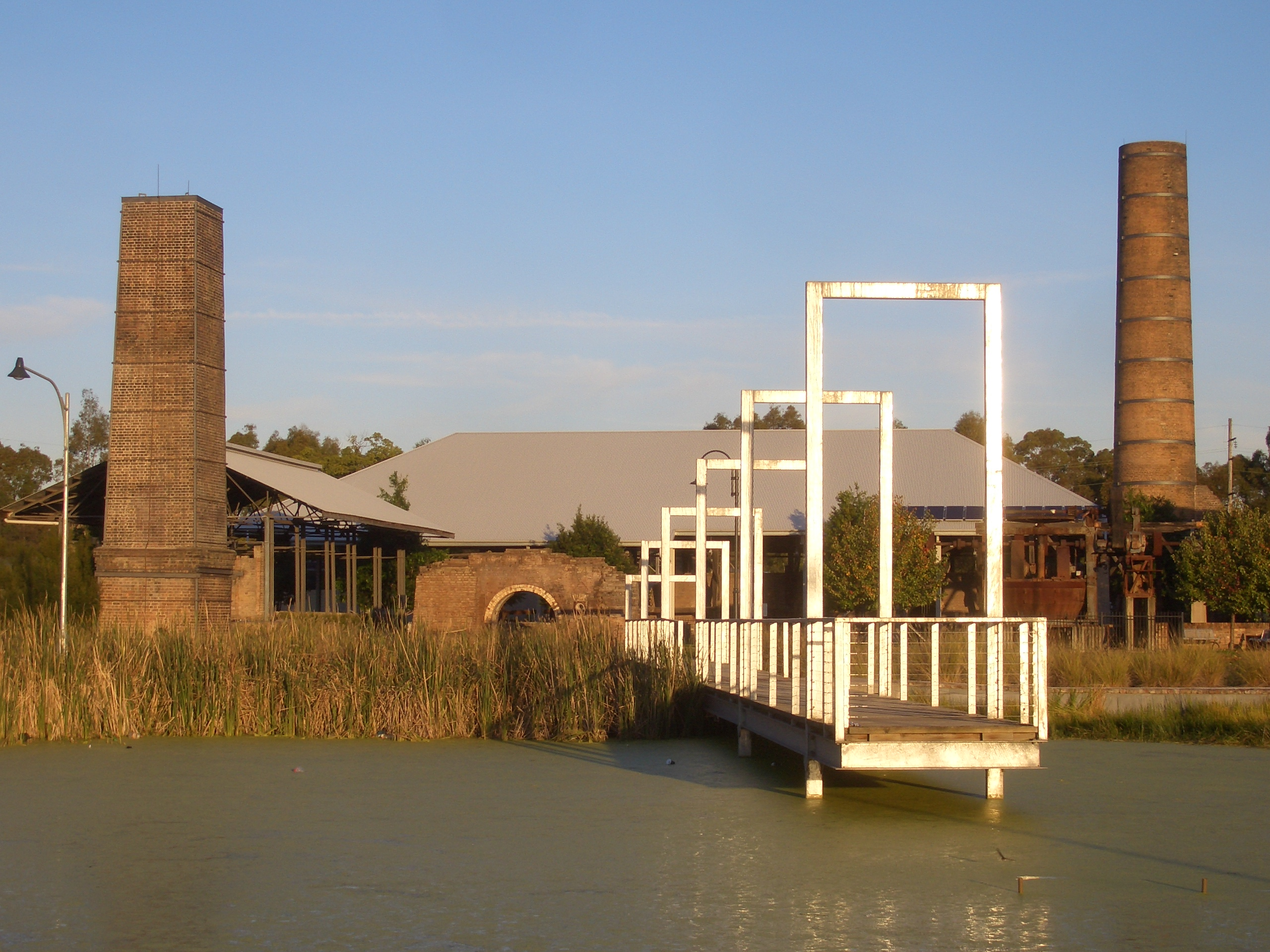
- Former brickworks

- Interactive map of Holroyd
- Country: Australia
- State: New South Wales
- City: Sydney
- LGA: Cumberland Council
- Location: 20 km (12 mi) W of Sydney CBD

Government
  - State electorate: Granville
  - Federal division: Blaxland
- Elevation: 18 m (59 ft)

Population
  - Total: 1,248 (2021 census)
- Postcode: 2142
Suburbs around Holroyd
Westmead	Parramatta	Harris Park
Merrylands	Holroyd	Granville
Merrylands	Merrylands	Granville

Holroyd is a small suburb in Western Sydney, New South Wales, Australia. Holroyd is located 20 kilometres (12 mi) west of the Sydney central business district in the local government area of the Cumberland Council. The previous local government area of Holroyd City took its name from Arthur Holroyd, first Mayor of the area, local landowner and businessman. The administrative centre is located in nearby Merrylands.

== History ==
Arthur Todd Holroyd (1806–1887) acquired Sherwood Scrubs in 1855. Located in Merrylands, it was named after his former home in England. Holroyd became a Member of Parliament for Bathurst Plains then Parramatta, and was a judge for the NSW Supreme Court, had completed one year medical residency in London and was a keen businessman. He was respected and powerful and was on many and varied boards and committees. He became the first mayor of Holroyd Council, then the Municipality of Prospect & Sherwood, from 1872 to 1927 with only 250 ratepayers for first 9 years. He made clay pipes for drainage at Sherwood Scrubs and introduced drainage to the local area. He also encouraged the rail line to Parramatta Junction.

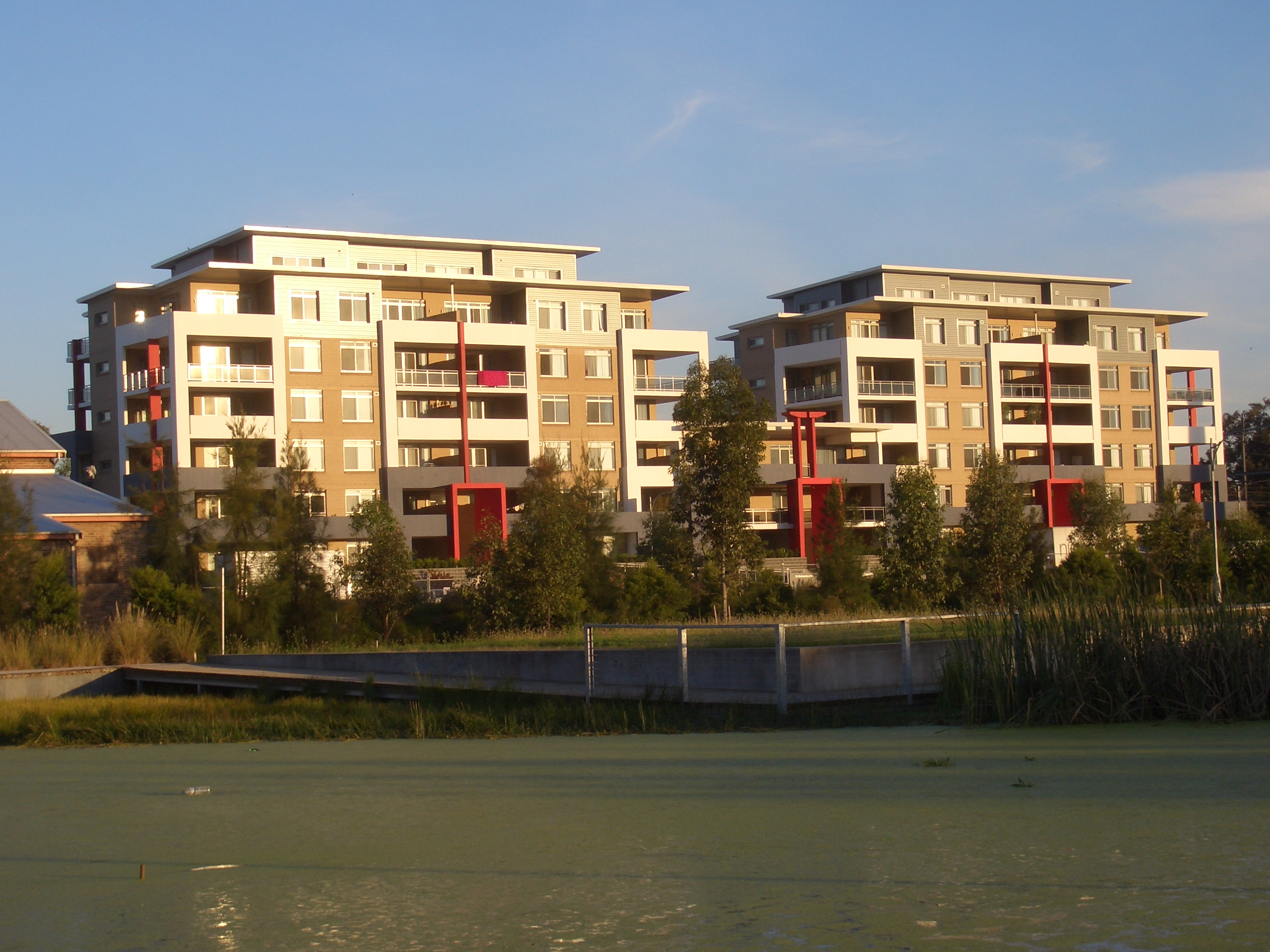
Brickworks apartments

The suburb of Holroyd was created when the New South Wales Geographical Names Board sought to define suburb boundaries in 1999. Holroyd Council Local Government Area did not have a specific suburb of the same name and had to create one to satisfy the State Government requirements as carried out by the Geographical Names Board. The suburb named Holroyd was gazetted in 1999 with boundaries being Walpole Street (north), Neil Street (south) the railway line (east) and Pitt Street (west). There was a change to the boundary in 2001 with the northern boundary extended to the freeway.

== Landmarks ==
The historic Goodlet and Smith Brickpit sites have now been redeveloped into Holroyd Gardens Park on the site of a clay pit that was later filled. Holroyd Gardens Estate which is a medium density development that includes the remaining heritage brickwork kilns and associated buildings.

== Population ==
At the 2021 census, there were 1,248 residents in Holroyd. 38.2% of people were born in Australia. The next most common country of birth was India at 8.2%. 26.5% of people spoke only English at home. Other languages spoken at home included Arabic at 8.4%. The most common responses for religion were Islam 30.4%, No Religion 18.2%, Catholic 16.7% and Hinduism 9.9%.
