= South Wentworthville =

- Suburb
- Interactive map of South Wentworthville
- Coordinates: 33°49′24″S 150°57′55″E
- Country: Australia
- State: New South Wales
- City: Greater Western Sydney
- LGA: Cumberland Council
- Location: 26 km (16 mi) west of Sydney CBD

Government
  - State electorates: Granville; Prospect
  - Federal divisions: Blaxland; Parramatta
- Elevation: 46 m (151 ft)

Population
  - Total: 6,913 (2021 census)
- Postcode: 2145
Suburbs around South Wentworthville
Wentworthville	Wentworthville	Westmead
Greystanes	South Wentworthville	Mays Hill
Greystanes	Merrylands West	Merrylands

South Wentworthville is a predominantly residential suburb in Greater Western Sydney, in the state of New South Wales, Australia. South Wentworthville is located 26 kilometres west of the Sydney central business district, in the local government area of the Cumberland Council and is part of the Greater Western Sydney region. South Wentworthville is an extension of Wentworthville.

== History ==
Traditional owners of the land were the Dhrag or Darug peoples.

The Fullagar estate, the part which was South of the Great Western Highway was available for auction in 1895. The map shows the Western Road (now called the Great Western Highway) and Frances Street which no longer connects to the Highway because of the M4 construction.

The Fullagar estate was available for sale again in 1902 which shows the area between Coleman Street, France’s Street is in the middle and up to Richmond Street (which is not specifically named on this map).

== Transport ==
- Liverpool–Parramatta T-way – a bus-route that passes through South Wentworthville
- M4 cycleway – a cyclist and pedestrian path that connects South Wentworthville to Sydney Olympic Park

== Notable residents ==
- Channel Seven newsreader, Chris Bath, grew up in the suburb and worked at nearby Kmart Merrylands.

== See also ==
- List of Sydney suburbs
