= NewsLocal =

Community newspaper in Australia

NewsLocal is a subsidiary of News Corp Australia that operates its community newspapers in New South Wales. It used to be Cumberland-Courier Community Newspapers.

In April 2020, Newscorp announced they would suspend print publication of a number of local and regional newspapers due to the impact of the coronavirus pandemic in Australia.

In 2023, NewCorp started merging its Sydney-based The Daily Telegraph with NewsLocal.

As of 2018, its newspapers were:

- Blacktown Advocate
- Canterbury-Bankstown Express
- Central (newspaper)
- Express Advocate Gosford Edition
- Express Advocate Wyong Edition
- Fairfield Advance
- Hills Shire Times
- Hornsby & Upper North Shore Advocate
- Inner West Courier
- Liverpool Leader
- Macarthur Chronicle Camden Edition
- Macarthur Chronicle Campbelltown Edition
- Macarthur Chronicle Wollondilly Edition
- Manly Daily
- Mosman Daily
- Mt Druitt Standard
- North Shore Times
- Northern District Times
- Northside (newspaper)
- Parramatta Advertiser
- Penrith Press
- Southern Courier (Australian newspaper)
- Village Voice - Balmain
- Wentworth Courier

Defunct newspapers include:

- Lake Macquarie News
