= Merrylands High School =

Location
- Merrylands, New South Wales; Australia; 33.8408°S 150.9685°E

Information
- Type: Coeducational public high school
- Motto: French: Vérité Sans Peur (Truth Without Fear)
- Established: 1959
- Principal: Amika Prasad
- Grades: 7–12
- Enrolment: Approx. 900
- Colours: Green and yellow
- Website: merryland-h.schools.nsw.gov.au

Merrylands High School is a coeducational, comprehensive high school in Merrylands, a suburb in Western Sydney, New South Wales, Australia.

The school has an enrolment of 800 students; 62% of students come from language backgrounds other than English and over 50 cultures are represented at the school. The school's current principal is Amika Prasad. The school was established in 1959.

== Notable alumni ==
- Musician Rick Springfield attended Merrylands High School briefly during the 1960s.
- Fadi Ibrahim attended Merrylands High School during the 1980s.
