= Ryerson Index =

- Website type: Online database
- Available in: English
- Owner: Ryerson Index Inc.
- Founder: John Graham
- Website: ryersonindex.org
- Commercial: No
- Registration: No
- Launched: 1998
- Current status: Active

The Ryerson Index is an online index of death notices from Australian newspapers, past and present, compiled by the Sydney-based charity Ryerson Index Incorporated. The index database has in excess of 9 million records compiled from more than 470 newspapers and other sources across Australia. Obituaries, funeral notices and probate notices are also included. Indexing uses the crowdsourcing model, and is continuously updated by volunteers over the internet.

The idea of an index was first suggested by John Graham, convenor of the Sydney Dead Persons Society, in 1998. The concept gained momentum the following year when another member of the society, Joyce Ryerson, revealed that she had a 14-year collection of death notices from The Sydney Morning Herald kept in her laundry. A team of volunteers worked three years to compile the index from this initial material. Following this, additional records from other newspapers were added, and by 2005, there were one million entries. The Ryerson Index was named in honor of Joyce Ryerson's invaluable contributions; she died on 30 August 2012. The intention of the index is to help researchers locate notices in original published sources rather than act as a primary source.

Currently, the Index is used by both genealogists and non-genealogists all over Australia and countries worldwide. It has just (2023) celebrated its 25th anniversary as a website, with three of the founding members (President John Graham, Secretary Pauline Kettle and Committee Member Peter Kettle) still heavily involved.
