= Merrylands =

- Suburb
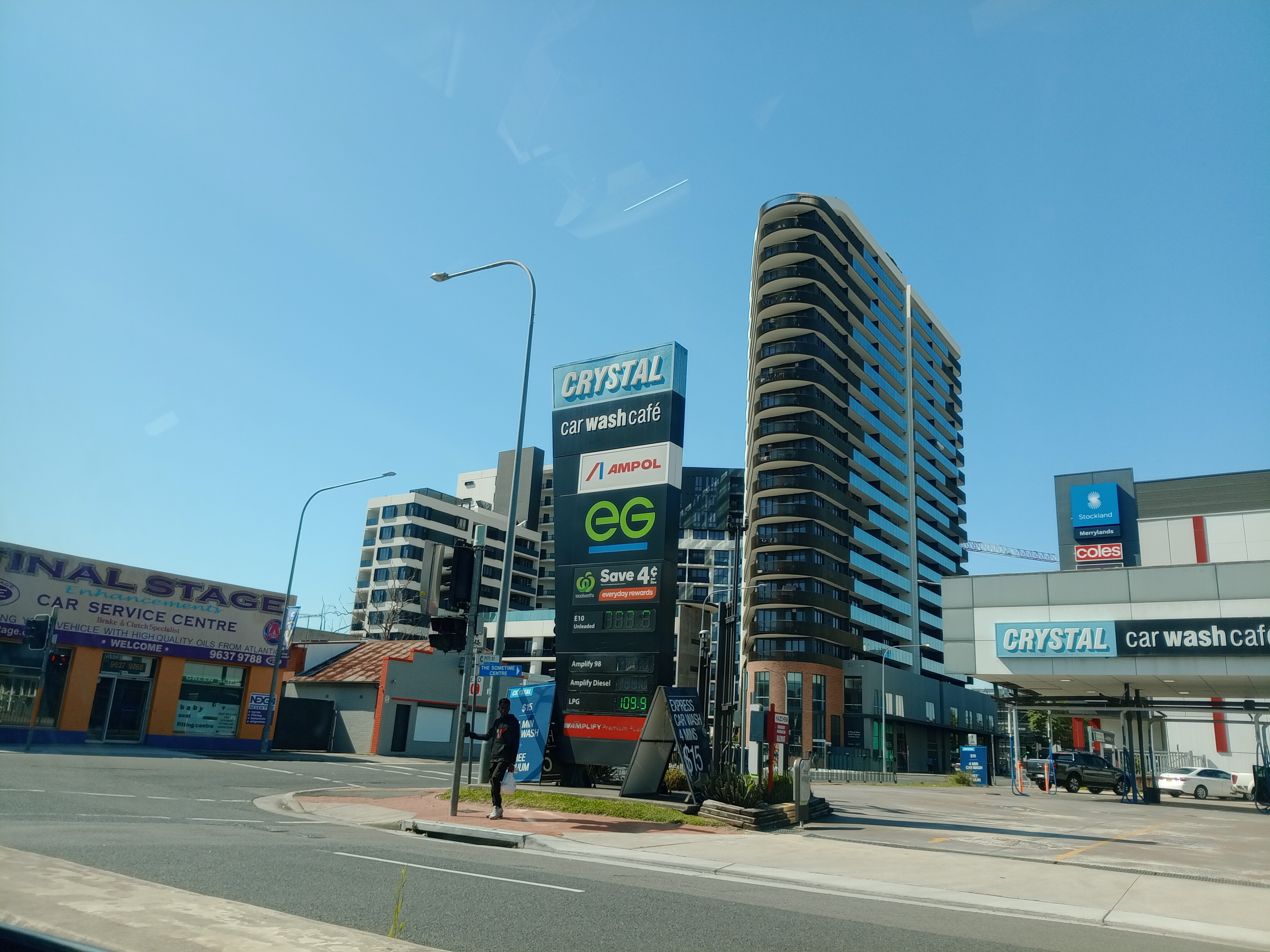
- Medium-rise residential apartments along Pitt Street, November 2024.

- Interactive map of Merrylands
- Coordinates: 33°50′15″S 150°59′30″E
- Country: Australia
- State: New South Wales
- City: Sydney
- LGA: Cumberland City Council
- Location: 25 km (16 mi) west of Sydney CBD
- Established: 1855

Government
  - State electorates: Auburn; Granville
  - Federal division: Blaxland
- Elevation: 27 m (89 ft)

Population
  - Total: 32,472 (2021 census)
- Postcode: 2160
Suburbs around Merrylands
Westmead	Parramatta	Granville
Merrylands West	Merrylands	Holroyd
Guildford West	Guildford	South Granville

Merrylands is a suburb and town in Western Sydney, Australia. Merrylands is located 25 kilometres (16 mi) west of the Sydney central business district and is in the local government area of the Cumberland City Council.

== History ==
Merrylands was named after the former English home of Arthur Todd Holroyd (1806–1887), who acquired land in this area in 1855 and who gave his name to the adjoining suburb of Holroyd.

== Commercial area ==
Merrylands has a commercial area around Merrylands railway station in Merrylands Road, which mainly feature art deco style of buildings constructed in the 1930s and 1940s and is ornamented by a couple of London planes. Stockland Merrylands is a shopping centre with supermarkets, discount department stores and specialty shops.

== Transport ==
Merrylands railway station is on the Main Southern railway line. There is parking for commuters. It is on the bus route from Liverpool to Parramatta. Main transport corridors of Woodville Road (Parramatta-Hume Highway, Western Motorway M4 (Mountains to the sea). Other main roads include Coleman Street (to Westmead Hospital), Hawkesview Road (rail overbridge to Woodville Road), Neil Street (rail overbridge to Woodville Road), Pitt Street (to Parramatta), Lois Street and Excelsior Street (to Granville).

== Religious buildings ==
There are a number of churches in Merrylands, including Merrylands East Presbyterian Church, St Margaret Mary's Catholic Church, Merrylands Anglican Church, Merrylands Baptist Church, Merrylands Uniting Church, Merrylands Presbyterian Church, an Evangelical church and C3 Church Merrylands. There is one mosque situated in Merrylands, The Daarul Arqam Mosque.

St Raphael's Slovenian Catholic Church

There is also a Heritage Catholic Micro-Cathedral in honour of Saint Raphael the Arch-Angel on the corner of Warwick Road and Merrylands Road, which was not only the first and only Church in Merrylands but also one of the most uniquely designed in Western Sydney being a conventional-modern-neo-Gothic design. The Church of St Raphael was conceived by Valerijan Jenko then soon to be completed and consecrated in 1973, by assistant bishop Dr. Stanislav Lenič from Ljubljana, Slovenija (previously Yugoslavia). The next building project was the church hall. Completed in 1983 the hall became the centre of lively cultural activities.

== Parks ==
=== Central Gardens ===
With an entry Merrylands Road and Paton Street along the Cumberland Highway this nature reserve has kangaroos, emus, birdlife and waterfalls around the lake. Pinnaroo (Paton Street) and Yarrabee (Merrylands Road) can be hired for the day from Cumberland Council for a fee. Access is by road or bus from Merrylands Station and is a route of the Liverpool to the Parramatta Transitway.

=== Ted Burge Reserve ===
Bounded by Centenary Road, Hollywood, Richmond and Fairmount Streets. Is used as a sporting field for cricket, soccer, softball and netball.

=== Merrylands Park ===
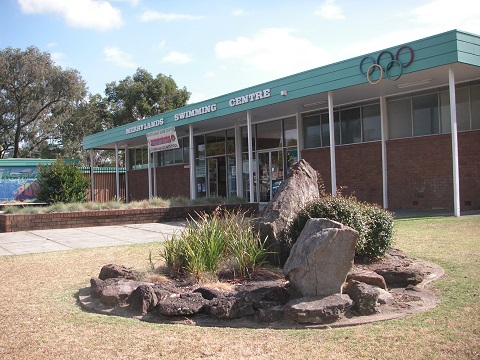
Merrylands Swimming Pool

On the corner of Merrylands Road and Burnett Street this complex has sporting fields, tennis courts, barbecue areas and a swim centre which has several outdoor pools and a grassed areas with a barbecue.

==== Merrylands Swimming Centre ====
Merrylands Swimming Centre was opened in 1968 and is owned and operated by Cumberland Council. The Swimming Centre was heated in 2004 and consists of 3 pools. An 8 lane 50m competition pool, a training pool and a babies pool. The water in the competition and training pools is heated to 27 °C. The centre is the home of the Merrylands Amateur Swimming Club – the second largest swimming club in the City of Cumberland and one of the largest in the South West of the Sydney Metropolitan Area.

=== Granville Park ===
Bounded by Merrylands Road (east of the railway line), Claremont Street, Montrose Avenue and Woodville Road the park is approximately 13.2ha in area. McDonald's has a restaurant on the corner of the park with access from Merrylands Road and Woodville Road. It has several sporting fields, a barbecue area, basketball court, cricket and nets, and playground equipment. When the circuses arrive they stay here.

During World War II, Granville Park was used as US Naval Base Hospital No 10, part of Naval Base Sydney.

=== Cycleways ===
Several main cycle routes pass through Merrylands and surrounding suburbs and linking up to Liverpool, Penrith and Sydney Harbour. M4 has an exit in Crown Street, Parramatta for Parrmatta, Merrylands and Holroyd access.

== Demographics ==
According to the 2021 census of population, there were 32,472 people in Merrylands.

- 51.2% of people were male, and 48.8% of people were female.
- The most common ancestries were Lebanese 18.1%, Australian 10.9%, Chinese 10.0%, English 8.2%, and Afghan 3.9%.
- 40.9% of people were born in Australia. The next most common countries of birth were Lebanon 7.6%, China 5.4%, Afghanistan 4.8%, India 3.3%, and Nepal 2.9%.
- 26.2% of people spoke only English at home. 74.8% of people spoke a non-English language at home. Some of the other languages spoken at home included Arabic 20.9%, Mandarin 5.8%, Hazaraghi 3.1%, Nepali 3.1%, and Dari 2.9%.
- The most common responses for religion were Islam 27.5%, Catholic 25.4%, No Religion 12.5%, Not Stated 10.3%, and Hinduism 5.8%.
- The most common occupations included Professionals 20.7%, Clerical and Administrative Workers 14.7%, Technicians and Trades Workers 12.0%, Community and Personal Service Workers 11.2%, Labourers 11.0%, Managers 9.6%, Machinery Operators and Drivers 9.1%, and Sales Workers 8.7%.

== Notable people ==
- Betty Cuthbert – track and field athlete. Born in Merrylands.
- Elie El-Zakhem - rugby league player
- Wendy Ey – track and field athlete
- Mosese Fotuaika - rugby league player
- Howard Fowles - politician
- John Ibrahim - nightclub owner. He and his brothers grew up in Merrylands and his mother still resides there.
- Frank Louat - barrister
- Barkaa (born Chloe Quayle) - Blak rapper and musician. Grew up in Merrylands.
- Michael Regan - politician
- Dani Stevens - discus thrower
- Eric Tweedale – rugby union player. Raised in Merrylands
