= Electoral results for the district of Granville =

Election results for Granville, New South Wales, Australia

Granville, an electoral district of the Legislative Assembly in the Australian state of New South Wales, has had two incarnations, the first from 1894 to 1920, the second from 1927 until the present.

== Members for Granville ==
First incarnation (1894–1920)
Election	Member	Party
1894	George Smailes	Labor
1895	George Smailes	Labor
1898	John Nobbs	Free Trade
1901	John Nobbs	Liberal Reform
1903	John Nobbs	Liberal Reform
1907	John Nobbs	Liberal Reform
1910	John Nobbs	Liberal Reform
1913	Jack Lang	Labor
1917	Jack Lang	Labor
Second incarnation (1927–present)
Election	Member	Party
1927	Bill Ely	Labor
1930	Bill Ely	Labor
1932	Claude Fleck	United Australia
1935	Claude Fleck	United Australia
1938	Bill Lamb	Labor
1941	Bill Lamb	Labor
1944	Bill Lamb	Labor
1947	Bill Lamb	Labor
1950	Bill Lamb	Labor
1953	Bill Lamb	Labor
1956	Bill Lamb	Labor
1959	Bill Lamb	Labor
1962	Pat Flaherty	Labor
1965	Pat Flaherty	Labor
1968	Pat Flaherty	Labor
1971	Pat Flaherty	Labor
1973	Pat Flaherty	Labor
1976	Pat Flaherty	Labor
1978	Pat Flaherty	Labor
1981	Pat Flaherty	Labor
1984	Laurie Ferguson	Labor
1988	Laurie Ferguson	Labor
1990 by	Kim Yeadon	Labor
1991	Kim Yeadon	Labor
1995	Kim Yeadon	Labor
1999	Kim Yeadon	Labor
2003	Kim Yeadon	Labor
2007	David Borger	Labor
2011	Tony Issa	Liberal
2015	Julia Finn	Labor
2019	Julia Finn	Labor
2023	Julia Finn	Labor

== Election results ==
=== Elections in the 2020s ===
==== 2023 ====
2023 New South Wales state election: Granville
Party	Candidate	Votes	%	±%
Labor	Julia Finn	27,163	55.8	+4.3
Liberal	Anm Masum	9,766	20.1	−15.4
Independent	Charbel Saad	3,907	8.0	+8.0
Liberal Democrats	John Hadchiti	3,792	7.8	+7.8
Greens	Janet Castle	2,755	5.7	+1.5
Animal Justice	Rohan Laxmanalal	1,304	2.7	+1.6
Total formal votes		48,687	94.1	−0.5
Informal votes		3,074	5.9	+0.5
Turnout		51,761	83.2	−3.4
Two-party-preferred result
Labor	Julia Finn	30,413	71.5	+12.1
Liberal	Anm Masum	12,123	28.5	−12.1
Labor hold		Swing	+12.1	

=== Elections in the 2010s ===
==== 2019 ====
2019 New South Wales state election: Granville
Party	Candidate	Votes	%	±%
Labor	Julia Finn	22,012	49.81	+8.78
Liberal	Tony Issa	16,522	37.39	−0.27
Greens	Benjamin Prociv	1,638	3.71	−1.69
Christian Democrats	Keith Piper	1,631	3.69	−8.71
Independent	Abdul Charaf	740	1.67	+1.67
Independent	Steven Lopez	682	1.54	−0.35
Animal Justice	Rohan Laxmanalal	652	1.48	+1.48
	Linda Harris	314	0.71	+0.71
Total formal votes		44,191	95.35	+0.04
Informal votes		2,154	4.65	−0.04
Turnout		46,345	86.55	−2.62
Two-party-preferred result
Labor	Julia Finn	23,629	57.64	+5.53
Liberal	Tony Issa	17,365	42.36	−5.53
Labor hold		Swing	+5.53	

==== 2015 ====
2015 New South Wales state election: Granville
Party	Candidate	Votes	%	±%
Labor	Julia Finn	18,555	41.0	+4.2
Liberal	Tony Issa	17,032	37.7	−4.8
Christian Democrats	Lara Taouk Sleiman	5,609	12.4	+7.1
Greens	James Atanasious	2,441	5.4	−0.4
Independent	Steven Lopez	857	1.9	+1.9
No Land Tax	Mario Marra	732	1.6	+1.6
Total formal votes		45,226	95.3	+0.5
Informal votes		2,223	4.7	−0.5
Turnout		47,449	89.2	−1.9
Two-party-preferred result
Labor	Julia Finn	20,662	52.1	+5.9
Liberal	Tony Issa	18,987	47.9	−5.9
Labor gain from Liberal		Swing	+5.9	

==== 2011 ====
2011 New South Wales state election: Granville
Party	Candidate	Votes	%	±%
Liberal	Tony Issa	18,510	41.3	+13.1
Labor	David Borger	17,000	38.0	−10.2
Independent	Paul Garrard	4,488	10.0	+0.5
Christian Democrats	Alex Sharah	2,472	5.5	+1.0
Greens	Richard Kennedy	2,325	5.2	+1.2
Total formal votes		44,795	95.6	−0.3
Informal votes		2,057	4.4	+0.3
Turnout		46,852	91.9	
Two-party-preferred result
Liberal	Tony Issa	21,276	52.7	+13.8
Labor	David Borger	19,093	47.3	−13.8
Liberal gain from Labor		Swing	+13.8	

=== Elections in the 2000s ===
==== 2007 ====
2007 New South Wales state election: Granville
Party	Candidate	Votes	%	±%
Labor	David Borger	20,178	48.1	−10.7
Liberal	Eddy Sarkis	11,833	28.2	+2.9
Independent	Paul Garrard	3,993	9.5	+9.5
Christian Democrats	Karen Pender	1,874	4.5	+1.0
Greens	Pauline Tyrrell	1,676	4.0	−1.1
Unity	Lily Su	1,623	3.9	+1.6
AAFI	Peter Dowman	752	1.8	+0.4
Total formal votes		41,929	95.9	+0.1
Informal votes		1,801	4.1	−0.1
Turnout		43,730	92.6	
Two-party-preferred result
Labor	David Borger	22,076	61.1	−8.1
Liberal	Eddy Sarkis	14,072	38.9	+8.1
Labor hold		Swing	−8.1	

==== 2003 ====
2003 New South Wales state election: Granville
Party	Candidate	Votes	%	±%
Labor	Kim Yeadon	22,448	59.3	+3.0
Liberal	Judy Irvine	9,522	25.1	−4.2
Greens	Wafaa Salti	1,903	5.0	+1.5
Christian Democrats	Karen Pender	1,307	3.5	+3.5
Unity	Somchai Tongsumrith	819	2.2	+2.2
One Nation	Shane O'Connor	612	1.6	−7.5
AAFI	John McGrath	556	1.5	−0.3
Democrats	Colin McDermott	392	1.0	+1.0
Independent	John Drake	324	0.9	+0.9
Total formal votes		37,883	95.6	−0.8
Informal votes		1,738	4.4	+0.8
Turnout		39,621	92.1	
Two-party-preferred result
Labor	Kim Yeadon	23,854	69.5	+4.9
Liberal	Judy Irvine	10,465	30.5	−4.9
Labor hold		Swing	+4.9	

=== Elections in the 1990s ===
==== 1999 ====
1999 New South Wales state election: Granville
Party	Candidate	Votes	%	±%
Labor	Kim Yeadon	22,330	56.3	−3.9
Liberal	Tony Issa	11,631	29.3	−1.8
One Nation	Shane O'Connor	3,599	9.1	+9.1
Greens	Melanie Gillbank	1,379	3.5	+3.5
AAFI	David Wadsworth	724	1.8	+1.8
Total formal votes		39,663	96.4	+4.1
Informal votes		1,489	3.6	−4.1
Turnout		41,152	93.1	
Two-party-preferred result
Labor	Kim Yeadon	23,720	64.6	+0.4
Liberal	Tony Issa	13,011	35.4	−0.4
Labor hold		Swing	+0.4	

==== 1995 ====
1995 New South Wales state election: Granville
Party	Candidate	Votes	%	±%
Labor	Kim Yeadon	19,893	60.6	+4.2
Liberal	Les Osmond	10,086	30.7	−0.4
Call to Australia	John Ananin	2,151	6.5	+3.8
Natural Law	Lucia Van Oostveen	718	2.2	+2.2
Total formal votes		32,848	92.3	+4.7
Informal votes		2,754	7.7	−4.7
Turnout		35,602	93.4	
Two-party-preferred result
Labor	Kim Yeadon	20,467	64.5	+2.5
Liberal	Les Osmond	11,265	35.5	−2.5
Labor hold		Swing	+2.5	

==== 1991 ====
1991 New South Wales state election: Granville
Party	Candidate	Votes	%	±%
Labor	Kim Yeadon	17,560	56.4	+0.2
Liberal	Les Osmond	9,690	31.1	−0.9
Independent	Peter Sayegh	1,998	6.4	+6.4
Democrats	Clinton Reynolds	1,055	3.4	+3.3
Call to Australia	Keith Barron	843	2.7	−5.0
Total formal votes		31,146	87.6	−7.2
Informal votes		4,408	12.4	+7.2
Turnout		35,554	94.3	
Two-party-preferred result
Labor	Kim Yeadon	18,256	61.9	+0.7
Liberal	Les Osmond	11,213	38.1	−0.7
Labor hold		Swing	+0.7	

==== 1990 by-election ====
1990 Granville by-election Saturday 23 June
Party	Candidate	Votes	%	±%
Labor	Kim Yeadon	14,960	59.36	+2.56
Independent	Tony Issa	4,744	18.82	
Greens	Lisa Macdonald	3,477	13.80	
Call to Australia	Keith Barron	2,020	8.02	−2.18
Total formal votes		25,201	96.00	
Informal votes		1,049	4.00	
Turnout		26,250	80.04	
Two-candidate-preferred result
Labor	Kim Yeadon	15,770	71.55	
Independent	Tony Issa	6,269	28.45	
Labor hold		Swing	+10.65 (Note: compared to the two-party-preferred result for the 1988 Granville election.)	

Laurie Ferguson (Labor) resigned.

=== Elections in the 1980s ===
==== 1988 ====
1988 New South Wales state election: Granville
Party	Candidate	Votes	%	±%
Labor	Laurie Ferguson	16,724	56.8	−8.7
Liberal	Michel Bolgoff	9,707	33.0	+3.0
Call to Australia	Keith Barron	2,998	10.2	+10.2
Total formal votes		29,429	94.9	−1.2
Informal votes		1,566	5.1	+1.2
Turnout		30,995	94.4	
Two-party-preferred result
Labor	Laurie Ferguson	17,394	60.9	−7.0
Liberal	Michel Bolgoff	11,153	39.1	+7.0
Labor hold		Swing	−7.0	

==== 1984 ====
1984 New South Wales state election: Granville
Party	Candidate	Votes	%	±%
Labor	Laurie Ferguson	18,810	68.9	−3.1
Liberal	Yvonne Maio	8,476	31.1	+3.1
Total formal votes		27,286	96.2	+1.7
Informal votes		1,084	3.8	−1.7
Turnout		28,370	92.4	+1.3
Labor hold		Swing	−3.1	

==== 1981 ====
1981 New South Wales state election: Granville
Party	Candidate	Votes	%	±%
Labor	Pat Flaherty	19,188	72.0	+0.6
Liberal	Florence Maio	7,467	28.0	+9.3
Total formal votes		26,655	94.5	
Informal votes		1,547	5.5	
Turnout		28,202	91.1	
Labor hold		Swing	−6.6	

=== Elections in the 1970s ===
==== 1978 ====
1978 New South Wales state election: Granville
Party	Candidate	Votes	%	±%
Labor	Pat Flaherty	20,058	71.4	+2.6
Liberal	Florence Maio	5,245	18.7	−12.5
Democrats	Ronald Harrison	1,881	6.7	+6.7
Socialist Workers	Paul Petit	925	3.3	+3.3
Total formal votes		28,109	96.8	−0.9
Informal votes		932	3.2	+0.9
Turnout		29,041	93.1	−1.1
Two-party-preferred result
Labor	Pat Flaherty	22,085	78.6	+9.8
Liberal	Florence Maio	6,024	21.4	−9.8
Labor hold		Swing	+9.8	

==== 1976 ====
1976 New South Wales state election: Granville
Party	Candidate	Votes	%	±%
Labor	Pat Flaherty	19,807	68.8	+2.3
Liberal	Frank Babic	8,974	31.2	+2.3
Total formal votes		28,781	97.7	+1.3
Informal votes		691	2.3	−1.3
Turnout		29,472	94.2	+1.6
Labor hold		Swing	+1.3	

==== 1973 ====
1973 New South Wales state election: Granville
Party	Candidate	Votes	%	±%
Labor	Pat Flaherty	18,353	66.5	−0.8
Liberal	John Newland	7,964	28.9	−3.8
Democratic Labor	Terrence Luthy	1,266	4.6	+4.6
Total formal votes		27,583	96.4	
Informal votes		1,032	3.6	
Turnout		28,615	92.6	
Two-party-preferred result
Labor	Pat Flaherty	18,606	67.5	+0.2
Liberal	John Newland	8,977	32.5	−0.2
Labor hold		Swing	+0.2	

==== 1971 ====
1971 New South Wales state election: Granville
Party	Candidate	Votes	%	±%
Labor	Pat Flaherty	17,353	67.3	+6.5
Liberal	George Ajaka	8,430	32.7	−6.5
Total formal votes		25,783	97.3	
Informal votes		712	2.7	
Turnout		26,495	93.3	
Labor hold		Swing	+6.5	

=== Elections in the 1960s ===
==== 1968 ====
1968 New South Wales state election: Granville
Party	Candidate	Votes	%	±%
Labor	Pat Flaherty	15,704	60.8	+1.9
Liberal	Stewart Allan	10,134	39.2	+5.4
Total formal votes		25,838	96.8	
Informal votes		860	3.2	
Turnout		26,698	94.0	
Labor hold		Swing	+0.5	

==== 1965 ====
1965 New South Wales state election: Granville
Party	Candidate	Votes	%	±%
Labor	Pat Flaherty	13,565	58.9	+4.0
Liberal	Terence Quinn	7,793	33.8	+3.8
Democratic Labor	Andrew Diehm	1,692	7.3	+7.3
Total formal votes		23,050	97.3	−0.4
Informal votes		627	2.7	+0.4
Turnout		23,677	93.7	+0.2
Two-party-preferred result
Labor	Pat Flaherty	13,903	60.3	−6.7
Liberal	Terence Quinn	9,147	39.7	+6.7
Labor hold		Swing	−6.7	

==== 1962 ====
1962 New South Wales state election: Granville
Party	Candidate	Votes	%	±%
Labor	Pat Flaherty	12,997	54.9	−13.0
Liberal	Ernest Lough	7,110	30.0	+3.0
Independent	Albert Olsen	2,769	11.7	+11.7
Communist	John Bridgefoot	806	3.4	−1.7
Total formal votes		23,682	97.7	
Informal votes		555	2.3	
Turnout		24,237	93.5	
Two-party-preferred result
Labor	Pat Flaherty	15,857	67.0	−5.0
Liberal	Ernest Lough	7,825	33.0	+5.0
Labor hold		Swing	−5.0	

=== Elections in the 1950s ===
==== 1959 ====
1959 New South Wales state election: Granville
Party	Candidate	Votes	%	±%
Labor	Bill Lamb	15,273	67.9	
Liberal	Robert Leech	6,080	27.0	
Communist	Harold Ewer	1,137	5.1	
Total formal votes		22,490	97.9	
Informal votes		473	2.1	
Turnout		22,963	93.7	
Two-party-preferred result
Labor	Bill Lamb	16,183	72.0	
Liberal	Robert Leech	6,307	28.0	
Labor hold		Swing		

==== 1956 ====
1956 New South Wales state election: Granville
Party	Candidate	Votes	%	±%
Labor	Bill Lamb	14,613	67.1	−25.8
Liberal	Robert Mutton	6,314	29.0	+29.0
Communist	Rupert Lockwood	865	4.0	−3.1
Total formal votes		21,792	98.0	+6.0
Informal votes		440	2.0	−6.0
Turnout		22,232	94.3	−0.4
Two-party-preferred result
Labor	Bill Lamb	15,391	70.6	−22.3
Liberal	Robert Mutton	6,401	29.4	+29.4
Labor hold		Swing	N/A	

==== 1953 ====
1953 New South Wales state election: Granville
Party	Candidate	Votes	%	±%
Labor	Bill Lamb	18,364	92.9	
Communist	Albert Williams	1,415	7.1	
Total formal votes		19,779	92.0	
Informal votes		1,729	8.0	
Turnout		21,508	94.7	
Labor hold		Swing		

==== 1950 ====
1950 New South Wales state election: Granville
Party	Candidate	Votes	%	±%
Labor	Bill Lamb	16,061	66.9	
Liberal	William Campbell	7,941	33.1	
Total formal votes		24,002	98.6	
Informal votes		338	1.4	
Turnout		24,340	94.5	
Labor hold		Swing		

=== Elections in the 1940s ===
==== 1947 ====
1947 New South Wales state election: Granville
Party	Candidate	Votes	%	±%
Labor	Bill Lamb	17,505	74.5	+0.7
Lang Labor	Frederick Cruse	5,998	25.5	−0.7
Total formal votes		23,503	94.1	−0.9
Informal votes		1,478	5.9	+0.9
Turnout		24,981	94.8	+1.6
Labor hold		Swing	+0.7	

==== 1944 ====
1944 New South Wales state election: Granville
Party	Candidate	Votes	%	±%
Labor	Bill Lamb	14,437	73.8	+5.9
Lang Labor	Wilfred O'Neill	5,135	26.2	+26.2
Total formal votes		19,572	95.0	−3.5
Informal votes		1,022	5.0	+3.5
Turnout		20,594	93.2	−0.7
Labor hold		Swing	N/A	

==== 1941 ====
1941 New South Wales state election: Granville
Party	Candidate	Votes	%	±%
Labor	Bill Lamb	13,282	67.9	
United Australia	Claude Fleck	5,392	27.6	
Independent	Sam Aarons	876	4.5	
Total formal votes		19,550	98.5	
Informal votes		303	1.5	
Turnout		19,853	93.9	
Labor hold		Swing		

=== Elections in the 1930s ===
==== 1938 ====
1938 New South Wales state election: Granville
Party	Candidate	Votes	%	±%
Labor	Bill Lamb	10,999	51.8	+8.2
United Australia	Claude Fleck	10,227	48.2	+5.0
Total formal votes		21,226	97.9	+0.9
Informal votes		449	2.1	−0.9
Turnout		21,675	97.0	−0.9
Labor gain from United Australia		Swing	+2.0	

==== 1935 ====
1935 New South Wales state election: Granville
Party	Candidate	Votes	%	±%
United Australia	Claude Fleck	8,990	46.2	−1.2
Labor (NSW)	Bill Ely	8,489	43.6	−1.1
Federal Labor	James Brophy	1,368	7.0	+0.2
Communist	Adam Ogston	625	3.2	+2.2
Total formal votes		19,472	97.0	−0.5
Informal votes		593	3.0	+0.5
Turnout		20,065	97.9	+0.7
Two-party-preferred result
United Australia	Claude Fleck	9,777	50.2	−2.1
Labor (NSW)	Bill Ely	9,695	49.8	+2.1
United Australia hold		Swing	−2.1	

==== 1932 ====
1932 New South Wales state election: Granville
Party	Candidate	Votes	%	±%
United Australia	Claude Fleck	8,694	47.4	+17.9
Labor (NSW)	Bill Ely	8,188	44.7	−25.8
Federal Labor	James Brophy	1,250	6.8	+6.8
Communist	Raymond Hall	180	1.0	+1.0
Independent	James Harwood	19	0.1	+0.1
Total formal votes		18,331	97.5	−1.2
Informal votes		477	2.5	+1.2
Turnout		18,808	97.2	+0.5
Two-party-preferred result
United Australia	Claude Fleck	9,592	52.3	+22.8
Labor (NSW)	Bill Ely	8,739	47.7	−22.8
United Australia gain from Labor (NSW)		Swing	+22.8	

==== 1930 ====
1930 New South Wales state election: Granville
Party	Candidate	Votes	%	±%
Labor	Bill Ely	12,495	70.5	
Nationalist	Jack Argent	5,231	29.5	
Total formal votes		17,726	98.7	
Informal votes		225	1.3	
Turnout		17,951	96.7	
Labor hold		Swing		

=== Elections in the 1920s ===
==== 1927 ====
1927 New South Wales state election: Granville
Party	Candidate	Votes	%	±%
Labor	Bill Ely	8,076	57.5	
Nationalist	Thomas Morrow	4,948	35.2	
Independent	John Colquhoun	1,024	7.3	
Total formal votes		14,048	98.9	
Informal votes		158	1.1	
Turnout		14,206	89.2	
Labor win		(new seat)		

==== 1920–1927 ====
District abolished

=== Elections in the 1910s ===
==== 1917 ====
1917 New South Wales state election: Granville
Party	Candidate	Votes	%	±%
Labor	Jack Lang	6,707	50.8	−1.1
Nationalist	Walter Duncan	6,066	45.9	−2.2
Independent	Abraham Taylor	432	3.3	+3.3
Total formal votes		13,205	98.8	+1.5
Informal votes		155	1.2	−1.5
Turnout		13,360	67.7	−7.1
Labor hold		Swing	−1.1	

==== 1913 ====
1913 New South Wales state election: Granville
Party	Candidate	Votes	%	±%
Labor	Jack Lang	5,641	51.9	
Liberal Reform	John Nobbs	5,238	48.1	
Total formal votes		10,879	97.3	
Informal votes		305	2.7	
Turnout		11,184	74.8	
Labor gain from Liberal Reform				

==== 1910 ====
1910 New South Wales state election: Granville
Party	Candidate	Votes	%	±%
Liberal Reform	John Nobbs	4,537	58.9	
Labour	Francis McLean	3,170	41.1	
Total formal votes		7,707	98.2	
Informal votes		143	1.8	
Turnout		7,850	71.8	
Liberal Reform hold				

=== Elections in the 1900s ===
==== 1907 ====
1907 New South Wales state election: Granville
Party	Candidate	Votes	%	±%
Liberal Reform	John Nobbs	3,600	72.5	
Labour	Walter Duncan	1,363	27.5	
Total formal votes		4,963	96.5	
Informal votes		179	3.5	
Turnout		5,142	58.5	
Liberal Reform hold				

==== 1904 ====
1904 New South Wales state election: Granville
Party	Candidate	Votes	%	±%
Liberal Reform	John Nobbs	3,355	72.5	
Labour	James Catts	1,217	26.3	
Progressive	Thomas Dalton	56	1.2	
Total formal votes		4,628	99.6	
Informal votes		20	0.4	
Turnout		4,648	59.2	
Liberal Reform hold				

Granville was expanded to include part of Canterbury. The member for Granville was John Nobbs (Liberal Reform). The member for Canterbury was Thomas Mackenzie (Liberal Reform) who successfully contested that seat.

==== 1901 ====
1901 New South Wales state election: Granville
Party	Candidate	Votes	%	±%
Liberal Reform	John Nobbs	1,299	72.3	+9.4
Progressive	William Windsor	497	27.7	+6.6
Total formal votes		1,796	99.4	−0.1
Informal votes		11	0.6	+0.1
Turnout		1,807	65.4	−0.5
Liberal Reform hold				

=== Elections in the 1890s ===
==== 1898 ====
1898 New South Wales colonial election: Granville
Party	Candidate	Votes	%	±%
Free Trade	John Nobbs	994	63.0	
National Federal	William Windsor	333	21.1	
Labour	Charles Dyer	252	16.0	
Total formal votes		1,579	99.5	
Informal votes		8	0.5	
Turnout		1,587	65.9	
Free Trade gain from Labour				

==== 1895 ====
1895 New South Wales colonial election: Granville
Party	Candidate	Votes	%	±%
Labour	George Smailes	799	54.3	
Ind. Free Trade	John Nobbs	673	45.7	
Total formal votes		1,472	99.1	
Informal votes		14	0.9	
Turnout		1,486	67.1	
Labour hold				

==== 1894 ====
1894 New South Wales colonial election: Granville
Party	Candidate	Votes	%	±%
Labour	George Smailes	715	38.8	
Free Trade	George McCredie	527	28.6	
Ind. Free Trade	John Nobbs	410	22.2	
Protectionist	William Ewart	180	9.8	
Ind. Free Trade	John Ferguson	7	0.4	
Ind. Protectionist	Thomas Castle	5	0.3	
Total formal votes		1,844	98.9	
Informal votes		21	1.1	
Turnout		1,865	84.4	
Labour win		(new seat)		
