= 1990 Granville state by-election =

Election result for Granville, New South Wales, Australia

A by-election was held for the New South Wales Legislative Assembly electorate of Granville on 23 June 1990 because of the resignation of Laurie Ferguson (Labor) to successfully contest the 1990 federal election for Reid.

The Granville by-election was held the same day as the Heffron and Smithfield by-elections.

== Dates ==
Date	Event
17 February 1990	Resignation of Laurie Ferguson.
24 March 1990	1990 federal election
25 May 1990	Writ of election issued by the Speaker of the Legislative Assembly and close of electoral rolls.
1 June 1990	Nominations
23 June 1990	Polling day
2 August 1990	Return of writ

== Results ==
1990 Granville by-election Saturday 23 June
Party	Candidate	Votes	%	±%
Labor	Kim Yeadon	14,960	59.36	+2.56
Independent	Tony Issa	4,744	18.82	
Greens	Lisa Macdonald	3,477	13.80	
Call to Australia	Keith Barron	2,020	8.02	−2.18
Total formal votes		25,201	96.00	
Informal votes		1,049	4.00	
Turnout		26,250	80.04	
Two-candidate-preferred result
Labor	Kim Yeadon	15,770	71.55	
Independent	Tony Issa	6,269	28.45	
Labor hold		Swing	+10.65 (Note: compared to the two-party-preferred result for the 1988 Granville election.)	

== See also ==
- Electoral results for the district of Granville
- List of New South Wales state by-elections
