= Laurie Aarons =

Australian communist (1917–2005)

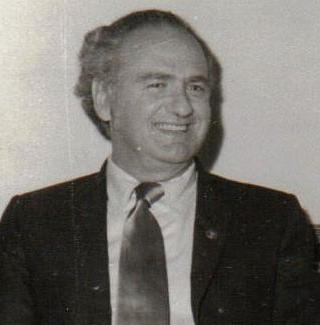

General Secretary of the Communist Party of Australia
- In office 5 June 1965 – 14 June 1976
- President: Richard Dixon; John Sendy; Jack Mundey; Laurie Carmichael
- Preceded by: Lance Sharkey
- Succeeded by: Joe Palmada; Mavis Robertson; Eric Aarons

Personal details
- Born: 19 August 1917 Sydney, New South Wales, Australia
- Died: 7 February 2005 (aged 87) Kogarah, New South Wales, Australia
- Party: Communist
- Spouses: Della Nicholas; Carole Arkinstall (m. 1944)
- Children: 3, including Mark
- Parent: Samuel (father)
- Relatives: Eric (brother)

Laurence Aarons (19 August 1917 – 7 February 2005), known as Laurie Aarons, was an Australian Communist leader, was National Secretary of the Communist Party of Australia (CPA) from 1965 to 1976.

== Biography ==
He was born in Sydney, son of Sam Aarons, a leading member of the Communist Party and a veteran of the Spanish Civil War. The Aarons family was of German-Jewish origin. His brother Eric Aarons was also a senior party member. He followed his father into the CPA as a teenager and became an active trade unionist.

During World War II Aarons was rejected for military service on security grounds, instead serving in the CPA's bureau for party members in the armed forces.

The period during and after World War II saw the CPA at the peak of its strength and influence, with about 10,000 members, under the veteran party leader Lance Sharkey, who had been installed by the Comintern in 1930.

=== Postwar ===
During the 1950s the party declined and Sharkey's leadership came under some criticism as he aged. Aarons became a leader of a group of younger party officials who favoured a new leadership and a change in the party line. Admirers of the Italian Communist Party leader Palmiro Togliatti, they became known as "the Italians."

During the Sino-Soviet split of the early 1960s the CPA suffered a split which resulted in the formation of the Communist Party of Australia (Marxist-Leninist), and Aarons led the majority pro-Soviet and anti-Chinese faction. In 1965 Sharkey finally retired and Aarons succeeded him as National Secretary of the party. He was a strong supporter of Nikita Khrushchev's liberalisation in the Soviet Union, and after Khrushchev's fall he became increasingly critical of the Soviet leadership's policies. In 1968 he welcomed Alexander Dubček's "Prague Spring" in Czechoslovakia, and bitterly criticised the Soviet-led occupation of Czechoslovakia in August 1968. In 1969, at meeting of world Communist parties in Moscow, he made a speech strongly critical of the invasion and of Soviet policy under Leonid Brezhnev generally. In 1971 Aarons remained with the CPA following a split which produced the pro-Soviet Socialist Party of Australia (SPA).

During the 1970s the CPA became a strong supporter of "Eurocommunism", abandoned Leninism and democratic centralism, and tried to form a "united front" of the various left-wing forces thrown up by the movement of opposition to the Vietnam War. But the party failed to recruit many new members from the New Left of the 1960s and '70s, and continued to decline in numbers and influence. Aarons retired as National Secretary in 1976, but remained influential in CPA affairs until the party was wound up in 1991. The SPA subsequently resumed the name "Communist Party of Australia".

Commenting on his brother's career, Eric Aarons outlined what he considered Laurie Aarons's greatest achievements. One was to see that the Vietnam War would be the major political issue in Australia during the 1960s, and to place the CPA in the leadership of a broad antiwar movement. Another was to abandon democratic centralism and introduce genuine internal party democracy. A third was challenging the Soviet line over Czechoslovakia and other issues. In the long run, however, Aarons was unable to prevent the decline of the CPA and of Communist politics generally in Australia.

During his declining years in the town of Maianbar, New South Wales, despite several painful medical conditions, Aarons continued to involve himself in community activities and to write books and articles. He died of cancer in Calvary Hospital, Sydney, on 7 February 2005, aged 87.

== Personal life ==
Aarons married Della Nicholas in 1937, but the couple later split up.

in 1944 Aarons married Carole Arkinstall, with whom he had three sons: Brian Aarons, who was also later prominent in the Communist Party, Mark Aarons, a broadcaster, journalist and author, and John Aarons.

Party political offices
Preceded by Lance Sharkey	General Secretary of the Communist Party of Australia; 1965–1976	Succeeded by Eric Aarons _{as joint National Secretary}
