= Sendy =

Sendy is a given name and surname. Notable people with the name include:

== Surname ==
- Jean Sendy (1910–1978), French writer and translator
- John Sendy (1924–2004), Australian communist activist

== Given name ==
- Sendy Pratama (born 1997), Indonesian football player
- Sendy Rleal (born 1980), Dominican Republic baseball player
