= List of Archibald Prize 1960 finalists =

1960 Archibald Prize finalists

This is a list of finalists for the 1960 Archibald Prize for portraiture, listed by Artist and Title. As the images are copyright, an external link to an image has been listed where available.

| Artist | Title | Subject | Notes |
|---|---|---|---|
| Norma Allen | James Ramsey | | |
| Norma Allen | Self-portrait | | |
| Alan Baker | Self-portrait | | |
| Joan Beck | Self-portrait | | |
| Reshid Bey | Matron Vivian Bullwinkel | | |
| Shirley Bourne | Tony Marinato | | |
| Mary Brady | Dr. Robert J. Noble | | |
| Rex Bramleigh | The Hon. Mr. Justice Barry | | |
| Ernest Buckmaster | The Hon. R. J. Gray | | |
| Charles Bush | Self-portrait at 40 | | |
| Donald Cameron | J. M. Cameron | | |
| Donald Cameron | John Counsel Porter | | |
| Reg Campbell | Barry Gurdon | | |
| Reg Campbell | Eric Baume | | |
| Jack Carington Smith | Dr William Bryden | | |
| Jack Carington Smith | Sir Edmund Hillary | | |
| Leonard Henry Carter | Self-portrait | | |
| Judy Cassab | Stanislaus Rapotec | | Winner: Archibald Prize 1960 |
| Walter Chandler | Rex Thorley | | |
| A. D. Colquhoun | Surgeon Rear Admiral L Lockwood | | |
| Noel Counihan | Judah Waten | | |
| William Dargie | Self-portrait | | |
| Frank G. Dickinson | R. Keith Yorston | | |
| Douglas Dundas | Miss Jan Barber | | |
| Maximilian Feuerring | Self-portrait | | |
| Bruce Fletcher | Mr. Henry Bolte | | |
| Sam Fullbrook | The dancer, Ruth Bergner | | |
| Henry Aloysius Hanke | Alderman P D Hills, MLA | | |
| Weaver Hawkins | Rene Hawkins | | |
| Newton Hedstrom | Bernard Hesling | | |
| Sali Herman | Joan | | |
| Sali Herman | Rabbi Porush | | |
| Vera Hrubska | Barry Stern | | |
| Harry E. Hudson | Self-portrait | | |
| Graeme Inson | Richard Edwards | | |
| Graeme Inson | Rev Dr WJ Edwards | | |
| Jean Isherwood | The Hon. Mr. Justice MacFarlan | | |
| Kenneth Jack | Self-portrait | | |
| Molly Johnson | Brenda | | |
| Molly Johnson | Frank Spears | | |
| Vernon Jones | Henry H. York | | |
| Louis Kahan | Dame Mary Gilmore | | |
| J. Noel Kilgour | Wilga | | |
| Garrett Kingsley | Michael Volin | | |
| Garrett Kingsley | Harry Pugmire | | |
| Valerie Lazarus | John Antill | | |
| Olive Long | Mrs. Charles Cruickshank | | |
| Julia B. Lynch | Miss Erin Quinn | | |
| Herbert McClintock | Self-portrait | | |
| Enid Mackellar | Mrs. M. Okkerse | | |
| Alan Martin | Frank Downes | | |
| Charles Meere | Jack | | |
| Max Middleton | The Hon. Mr Justice Adam | | |
| Jon Molvig | Sir Percy Spender | | |
| Kathleen O'Connor | Great-grandson of C. Y. O'Connor | | |
| Carlien Parker | Virginia Pye | | |
| Carlien Parker | Lieut. Commander D. A. Ross | | |
| L Scott Pendlebury | Dr. Kel Semmens | | |
| William Pidgeon | William Dobell | | |
| William Pidgeon | The Hon. Sir Edward Warren | | |
| Gwen Pratt | Val Pratt, B.Sc. | | |
| Iris Hope Proctor | Portrait of Jan | | |
| Marjorie Prophet | Joe | | |
| John Thomas Rigby | Self-portrait | | |
| Alex Robertson | Bea Miles | | |
| Joe Rose | Self-portrait | | |
| William Salmon | Frank Zeppel | | |
| John Santry | Mr R. S. Wakelin | | |
| Francis Sherwood | Mrs. M. M. Sherwood | | |
| Andrew Sibley | David Rowbotham | | |
| Andrew Sibley | Dr Gertrude Langer | | |
| Joshua Smith | His Excellency The Governor of Victoria, General Sir Dallas Brooks | | |
| Joan Alexandra Swinbourne | Mrs. Gratton-Wilson | | |
| John Talbert | Judy | | |
| Graham A. Thorley | Keith Ralston | | |
| William Torrance | Self-portrait | | |
| Thora Ungar | Bob Poynter | | |
| Thora Ungar | Mary James | | |
| Grace Ward | Dr. John Weatherly | | |
| Reinis Zusters | Terry Clune | | |

== See also ==
- List of Archibald Prize winners
- Lists of Archibald Prize finalists
