= Eric Aarons =

Australian activist (1919–2019)

General Secretary of the Communist Party of Australia
- In office 14 June 1976 – 14 June 1982 Serving with Bernie Taft (1979–1982)
- President: Judy Mundey
- Preceded by: Laurie Aarons
- Succeeded by: Position nominally dissolved

Personal details
- Born: Marrickville, New South Wales, Australia
- Died: 18 January 2019 (aged 99)
- Party: Communist
- Spouse: Betty Dent (m. 1942–1950)
- Domestic partners: Esther Taylor; Peta Salmon
- Parent: Samuel (father)
- Relatives: Laurie (brother); Mark (nephew)
- Education: University of Sydney

Eric Aarons (16 March 1919 – 18 January 2019) was a member of the third of four generations of the Aarons family who played leading roles in the Communist Party of Australia (CPA).

Aarons played an important role in the party's work from the mid-1940s to the winding up of the party in the early 1990s. He rose to be in charge of party education, to be a leading theorist and author, an advocate for the de-Stalinisation of the CPA and was one of three people who jointly replaced his older brother, Laurie Aarons, as CPA National Secretary in 1976.

== Early life ==
Born in Marrickville in inner-city Sydney, Aarons moved with his parents and older brother, Laurie, to Melbourne as a young boy. Here he became close to his grandparents, Jane and Louis Aarons, Jewish immigrants from the United States and Britain who had earlier been active in both the Australian Labor Party (ALP) and the far more radical Victorian Socialist Party.

When the CPA was formed in 1920 – inspired by the Russian Revolution of 1917 – Jane and Louis became foundation members in Melbourne and were among the early Australian communists to visit the Soviet Union. Aarons' father, Sam, joined the CPA and became a prominent figure in the party's local activities and in the mid-1930s travelled to Spain to volunteer for the International Brigade formed to assist the Spanish Republic resist Francisco Franco's ultimately successful uprising against the elected Popular Front government.

After finishing school in Melbourne, Eric Aarons moved back to Sydney in the mid-1930s and worked for a couple of years in his father's boot repair business before studying at Sydney University. There he obtained a First Class Honours Bachelor of Science degree specialising in chemistry. During this period he joined the CPA and became active in student politics and anti-fascist, anti-war and peace causes.

== Political activism ==
During the Second World War Aarons worked in key war industries using his scientific expertise for the war effort, but also was active in organising communist industrial branches. After the war he took up work for the CPA as an educator, organising Marxist study courses that aimed to provide working class activists with theoretical frameworks that would help them develop and implement correct communist practice for Australian conditions.

In 1947 he was sent to Wollongong, as secretary of the CPA's South Coast District. In the early 1950s the Chinese Communist Party (CCP) invited the CPA to send a delegation to China to study for several years in Peking (now Beijing). The idea was for Australian communists to familiarise themselves with Chinese communist theoretical ideas and to study the practical conditions that had led to the victory of Mao Zedong’s revolution in 1949 so that those experiences could help to develop an Australian path to communist revolution.

The CPA leadership chose Aarons to lead this delegation so that he would return to Australia with fresh ideas for new training and education methods and courses that would be relevant to local conditions. He spent three years studying in China and upon his return he developed a fundamentally different approach to party education that was only partially implemented, due to resistance from older members of the CPA leadership.

His experiences in China led to further CPA groups studying in China, most notably an 18 months school led by his brother a few years later. At this time, the CPA leadership was attracted to Mao’s political ideas and the apparent freshness and vigour of the “New China”. CPA leaders also saw themselves as closely relating to other Asian communist parties within the wider International Communist Movement. In this, Australian communists were well ahead of other Australian political parties and the Eurocentric Soviet-led communist movement in recognising the growing importance of Asia in world affairs.

In 1959 Aarons was sent by the CPA to be secretary of the Newcastle District, a highly working class industrial and mining town 150 kilometres north of Sydney. During this period he not only was closely engaged in trade union and community organising activities but also began to review the history of communism, both internationally and domestically, to try to come to terms with the re-appraisals that were taking place in Moscow and apply those lessons to the Australian experience.

Nikita Khrushchev’s denunciation of Joseph Stalin at the Communist Party of the Soviet Union’s (CPSU) 20th Congress in 1956, followed shortly after by the suppression of the Hungarian Revolution of 1956 which aimed for an independent and more democratic kind of socialism, had thrown the CPA into chaos, as these events did within most Western communist parties.

In response to these and other events, the two Aarons brothers, together with a wider group of younger communist leaders (including John Sendy, Bernie Taft, Rex Mortimer, Alec and Mavis Robertson, among others) slowly evolved towards an anti-authoritarian version of socialism. Ironically, in light of the long years the Aarons brothers, Sendy and Taft had spent in China, the first major catalyst for this new direction was the Sino-Soviet dispute which began to openly emerge in the late 1950s.

By the early 1960s it had become clear that the division between Moscow and Beijing was centrally about Khrushchev’s inconsistent but nevertheless radical departure from Stalin’s political course, including his denunciation of Stalin’s crimes against humanity, catastrophic economic policies and destructive international policy which placed Soviet national interests, as Stalin saw them, first and foremost. Mao was equally determined to reaffirm Stalinism and apply its methods in China, together with an extreme left position internationally which downplayed the dangers and horrors of nuclear war and urged “revolutionary” action irrespective of the realities in specific countries.

The older CPA leadership endorsed the direction adopted at the 1960 meeting of the International Communist Movement which overwhelmingly rejected Mao's position and that of his few supporters such as Enver Hoxha’s Albania. When Mao launched an international offensive to split communist parties around the world a small group of pro-Chinese CPA members emerged around Melbourne leader, Ted Hill. The younger group of CPA leaders, of which Aarons was a leading member, rallied CPA members against a return to Stalinist methods, as advocated by Hill and his small group of supporters.

Aarons then played a major role in helping to develop new theoretical frameworks to try to make the CPA more relevant in the rapidly changing world of the 1960s, especially looking at the impact on modern capitalism of the explosion of scientific and technological advances. This work coincided with his being elected to the post of CPA National Secretary in 1965 and at this time Aarons also became a key member of the CPA national leadership as the younger generation assumed power from the generation that had run the CPA since the onset of the Great Depression in 1929.

Aarons and the other members of the new national leadership became acutely aware from the mid-1960s onwards that both Chinese and Soviet authoritarian methods were highly damaging to the cause of communism in advanced democratic countries such as Australia. This realisation soon brought them into sharp conflict with the CPSU, especially as Khrushchev's successor, Leonid Brezhnev, embarked on a new clampdown at this time that quickly undid the gains of Khrushchev's period of liberalisation.

The first open breach between the Australian and Soviet communist parties came in 1965 over the question of official repression of Soviet Jewry and the gaoling of two dissident writers, Yuli Daniel and Andrei Sinyavsky, and which the CPA leadership publicly criticised. The CPA's wider new direction also soon caused tensions with the Soviet leadership and conservative elements within the CPA, especially the development of a Charter of Democratic Rights which clearly advocated a style of socialism at odds with Soviet methods.

Aarons and other members of the new leadership warmly embraced Alexander Dubček’s Prague Spring policies in Czechoslovakia launched in January 1968, which advocated the freeing up of Czech political, social and economic systems and the development of a national road to socialism – “socialism with a human face”. As the stand-off between the CPSU and the new Czech leadership developed into a crisis in mid-1968, Aarons was given the task of making a deep study of Czech developments and writing detailed analyses of the claims and counter-claims between Dubček and the Czechoslovak communists, and Leonid Brezhnev and his supporters among the neo-Stalinist regimes in East Germany, Hungary, Bulgaria and elsewhere.

The Warsaw Pact invasion of Czechoslovakia in August 1968 deeply shocked Aarons and the other CPA leaders who had hoped that Dubček's new path would reinvigorate the communist cause, especially in Australia. The CPA became the first of several Western communist parties to unequivocally condemn the Soviet's crushing of the Prague Spring and to call for the withdrawal of the occupying forces, a stand later reiterated by Laurie Aarons at the 1969 International Communist Movement meeting in Moscow.

This led not only to a rapid and sharp deterioration of the CPA's relations with the CPSU but to a deep split among the CPA's membership. The flames of this split were fanned by covert actions on the part of the CPSU to support the pro-Moscow group which now attempted to reverse the policy changes which the new leaders, including Eric, had begun in the mid-1960s.

The split developed into a bitter affair, with people who had been close friends and comrades divided over whether to embrace a new way forward or to stick with the Soviet road. Lifelong friendships were irrevocably destroyed as both sides launched a huge organising effort in preparing for the CPA's 22nd Congress in 1970, at which the membership overwhelmingly endorsed the positions taken by Aarons and the other leaders.

In this dispute Aarons played not only a significant part in organising among the CPA membership, but also in developing and propounding the ideological basis for the CPA's new policies and helping to write key documents for the Congress. Although the Congress vote was decisive on key issues, such as endorsing the stand taken over the Czech invasion and adopting a new, democratic course in building socialism in Australia, the CPA was bitterly divided and the following year a new pro-Soviet party (the Socialist Party of Australia) was established with Moscow’s open support and covert financial backing and around one-third of the CPA membership either left to join it or dropped out of political activities altogether.

During these turbulent events Aarons left full-time employment with the CPA and took up teaching in the public school system. He had also taken up sculpting in the mid-1960s and was soon acclaimed as a gifted artist of both wood and stone sculptures. In 1972 he found the time to read and study philosophical developments and trends and that year saw not only his first major sculpture exhibition but the publication of his book Philosophy for an Exploding World: Today’s Values Revolution. In this work, Aarons attempted to look at social thought outside the narrow, dogmatic Marxist framework, point the way forward for socialist thinking in the modern world and extend the new thinking that had underpinned the CPA's development over the previous decade.

In 1974 Aarons returned to full-time work for the CPA as Editor (later Coordinator) of the CPA's weekly paper, Tribune, following the tragic early death of the then editor, Alec Robertson. Two years later Aarons became one of three Joint National Secretaries who worked collectively. This came about as a result of a major reform initiated by the CPA leadership which required that key posts, such as the National Secretary, could not be held by the same person for more than six years. As a consequence, his brother Laurie stepped down from that post at the CPA's 25th Congress in 1976.

Despite all the efforts that had gone into reinvigorating and renewing the CPA, its membership and influence continued to decline. The major splits with the pro-Chinese and pro-Soviet groups had seen many talented people (especially trade union leaders) depart either in frustration or into the splinter parties. From its height during the Second World War of a claimed 23,000 members, the CPA had shrunk to around 3,000 members in the mid-1970s, although it still exerted considerable influence in the trade unions, on the left wing of the ALP and in new movements such as Feminist movement, Gay Liberation and the environment movement.

During the 1970s a further deep division emerged between most of the Sydney-based leaders (including the Aarons brothers) and those in Melbourne grouped around Bernie Taft and John Sendy, who advocated a much more moderate policy towards the Soviet Union and the Warsaw Pact countries as well as a less antagonistic attitude towards “reformism” and the ALP. Although this division did not result in a split during the six years that Eric Aarons was joint CPA National Secretary, the Taft-led group eventually left the party in 1984 and led a large proportion of the Melbourne membership into the ALP.

The CPA eventually was wound up in 1991 when it became clear that the party could no longer continue to function due to both the collapse of communism as an idea and the shrinking of its membership and influence.

In the last 25 years of his life, Aarons lived in the bush to the south-west of Sydney on the site of the CPA's education facility that he did so much to build up and turn into a vibrant centre for reading, debating and discussing revolutionary theories and practice. He held major exhibitions of the sculptures he created in his bush home and read widely about political developments, philosophical trends, and economic theories.

== Later life ==
Since the early 1990s, Aarons published a number of important books, notably What’s Left? (1993), an account of his years of activism in the CPA, which as its title suggests, also posed some searching questions about the future of left-wing ideas and actions, and What’s Right? (2003), which analysed the development of neo-liberalism and questioned where this trend of right-wing ideas has left classical liberal thought.

This study of right-wing philosophy and activism led him to a deep study of the ideas and influence of the free market economist, Friedrich Hayek, whose ideas have influenced not only modern neo-liberal thinkers but to one extent or another have been put into practice around the world over the past 30 years. This resulted in the publication of Market Versus Nature: The Social Philosophy of Friedrich Hayek (2008), in which the operation of unfettered free markets is analysed and the problem of market failures addressed, especially as it relates to the destruction of the environment and global warming.

Aarons continued to think deeply and write about modern politics and ideas. In 2008 he completed writing Hayek versus Marx and Today’s Challenges, which compares the philosophies, ideas and influence of Friedrich Hayek and Karl Marx and questions whether they are relevant to future global challenges. His final conclusion on the Marxist dream was that the socialist project was flawed because the society envisaged was not feasible, although the movements it inspired engaged in many important campaigns and won important social reforms. He did not regret his own role as a leading Marxist theorist and activist in the CPA.

Aarons died on 18 January 2019 in Sydney, at the age of 99.

== Bibliography ==
=== Major publications ===
- Hayek versus Marx and Today’s Challenges, London: Routledge (forthcoming)
- Market versus Nature: The Social Philosophy of Friedrich Hayek, Melbourne: Australian Scholarly Publishing, 2008
- What’s Right? Sydney: Rosenberg, 2003
- What’s Left? Memoirs of an Australian Communist, Ringwood, Victoria: Penguin, 1993
- Philosophy For An Exploding World: Today’s Values Revolution, Sydney: Brolga Books, 1972

=== Pamphlets and booklets ===
- Lenin’s Theories on Revolution, Sydney: D.B. Young, 1970
- Let The Sun Shine In: The Energy Crisis and How to Meet It, Sydney: Red Pen Publications, 1980
- Cuba: Beacon of the Americas, (with Pete Thomas), Brisbane: Queensland Guardian, 1966
- Economics for Workers, Sydney: Current Book Distributors, 1958, 1959, 1961
- The Steel Octopus: The Story of BHP, Sydney: Current Book Distributors, 1961

Party political offices
Preceded by Laurie Aarons	General Secretary of the Communist Party of Australia (joint national secretary); 1976–1982	Succeeded by
