= Henry Hanke =

Australian painter

Henry Aloysius Hanke (14 June 1901 – 29 September 1989) was born in Sydney in 1901. He was an Australian painter and teacher, who won the Archibald Prize in 1934 with a self-portrait, and the inaugural Sulman Prize in 1936 with his painting La Gitana.

Hanke served in the Army during World War II from November 1942, initially as a Signaller and later commissioned as an Officer and war artist from December 1943, during which he completed many paintings in New Guinea. He was the first war artist into Milne Bay after the Australians inflicted the first defeat on Japanese troops during World War II. Hanke was later made a director of the Royal Art Society art school.

Hanke was a friend of Sydney artists Graeme Inson and Ivy Shore, and often visited them. Hanke was one of the five artists Ivy Shore (winner of the Portia Geach Memorial Art Award in 1979) called her "Inspirations". Ivy Shore's painting of these five artists, titled "Inspirations", now hangs in the Dundee Arms Hotel in Sussex Street, Sydney, which was Graeme Inson and Ivy Shore's studio in the 1970s and 1980s.

His daughter Sonya became a pianist and music educator.

Awards
Preceded by Charles Wheeler	Archibald Prize; 1934 for Self Portrait	Succeeded by John Longstaff
