= William Morrow (physician) =

Australian physician and specialist in gastroenterology

Sir William Morrow DSO, ED, FRCP
- Born: 12 July 1903; East Maitland, New South Wales
- Died: 22 August 1977 (aged 74); Darlinghurst, New South Wales
- Education: Newington College; University of Sydney; Royal College of Physicians; Royal Australasian College of Physicians
- Occupation: Physician
- Spouse(s): Jean Buchanan, née Brown (d.1971); Margaret Mary Chauvel, née Fairfax
- Children: Three daughters
- Parent(s): Arthur John Morrow and Helonar, née Harkin

Sir Arthur William Morrow, DSO, ED, FRCP (12 July 1903 – 22 August 1977) was an Australian physician and specialist in gastroenterology. He served terms as president of the Royal Australasian College of Physicians and of the Australian Club.

== Early life ==
Bill Morrow was born at East Maitland, New South Wales, the only child of Arthur John Morrow and Helonar (née Harkin).

Morrow attended Newington College (1919–1921) and was cox of the school's First VIII that won the Head of the River regatta in 1921. In the same year, he won the Wigram Allen Scholarship, awarded by Sir George Wigram Allen, for general proficiency, with Hubert Cunliffe-Jones receiving it for classics. At the end of 1921, he was named Dux of the College and received the Halse Rogers and Schofield Scholarships.

Morrow was awarded an exhibition in the Leaving Certificate and went up to the University of Sydney in 1922 from whence he graduated as a Bachelor of Medicine and Surgery with first-class honours in 1927.

== Career ==
=== Early medical career ===
Following his graduation, Morrow was appointed as a junior resident medical officer at Royal Prince Alfred Hospital and from 1932 was the deputy clinical superintendent. In 1933, he gained membership of the Royal College of Physicians.

=== War service ===
Morrow was commissioned as a captain with the Australian Army Medical Corps in 1929. Early in the Second World War he joined the Australian Imperial Force and as a lieutenant colonel he was placed in command of a medical division in the Middle East. After the German invasion of Greece in 1941 he served in Crete and Egypt. From 1942, until the end of the war, Morrow served in Katherine, Northern Territory, and Melbourne and he visited operational areas in New Guinea, New Britain, Bougainville and Borneo. He was promoted to temporary colonel and awarded the Distinguished Service Order and mentioned in dispatches.

=== Later medical career ===
Morrow rejoined Royal Prince Alfred Hospital as an honorary assistant-physician and was appointed an honorary physician in 1952. He became a consultant physician there in 1963 and also at the Concord Repatriation General Hospital, Canterbury Hospital and the now closed Marrickville and Western Suburbs hospitals. He lectured in therapeutics and chaired the Postgraduate Committee of Medicine at the University of Sydney. Morrow was the foundation president of the Gastroenterological Society of Australia in 1958.

=== College of Physicians ===
In 1938, Morrow was appointed a foundation member of the Royal Australasian College of Physicians and served as a member of the board of censors for 16 years and as its censor-in-chief from 1962 until 1966. He was elected president of the college in 1966 and served in that position until 1968.

== Personal life ==
=== Marriage and children ===
In 1937, Morrow married Jean Buchanan Brown at St Stephen's Presbyterian Church, Sydney. The couple lived in Bellevue Hill and had three daughters. Lady Morrow died in 1971 and, in 1974, Sir William married the widowed Margaret Mary Chauvel (née Fairfax) at St Mark's Anglican Church, Darling Point.

=== Clubs ===
Morrow was a member of the Australian Club and president from 1973 until 1975, during which time the club's site was redeveloped. Viscount Slim, whilst Governor-General of Australia is said to have occasionally asked his thoughts on matters of importance by enquiring what 'the Australian Club think of that?' He was also a member of Royal Sydney Golf Club and the Australian Jockey Club.

== Honours and memorials ==
- Distinguished Service Order – 1941, 30 December
- Knight Bachelor – 1959, New Year Honours
- A. W. Morrow Department of Gastroenterology – 1961, Royal Prince Alfred Hospital
- A. W. Morrow Chair in Medicine – 1994, University of Sydney

== Portraits ==
- Howard Barron – Held by the Royal Australasian College of Physicians
- Graeme Inson – Held by Royal Prince Alfred Hospital

== Bibliography ==
- A. S. Walker, Middle East and Far East (Canb, 1953)
- A. S. Walker, The Island Campaigns (Canb, 1957)
- Lives of the Fellows of the Royal College of Physicians of London, vol 7 (Lond, 1984)
- J. R. Angel, The Australian Club 1838–1988 (Syd, 1988)
- G. L. McDonald (ed), Roll of the Royal Australasian College of Physicians, vol 2 (Syd, 1994)
- University of Sydney Medical Society, Senior Year Book (Syd, 1926)
- Medical Journal of Australia, 13 January 1979
- Sydney Morning Herald, 23 August 1977
