= Annette Cameron =

Australian feminist (1920–2008)

Annette Elizabeth Cameron, née Moore and formerly Aarons (6 January 1920 – 25 January 2008) was an Australian feminist and political activist.

Born in Middle Swan in Western Australia, she came from a political family. Her great-grandfather's brother, George Fletcher Moore, had been a pioneering settler around the Swan River, while her grandfather William Dalgety Moore was a member of the Western Australian Legislative Council from 1870 to 1872. Annette was educated in Perth, where her political interests were awakened by the Spanish Civil War, which led her to join the Anti-Fascist League and, in 1941, the Communist Party of Australia. Moving to Sydney, she worked for the party, was briefly jailed for her role in a protest supporting Indonesian independence, and developed a friendship with Katharine Susannah Prichard.

Having met prominent communist Sam Aarons in Sydney, she married him and returned to Perth; they had one son, Gerald, in 1949. In the late 1950s Annette and Gerald were flown to China by the Maoist government to visit Sam, who had suffered a heart attack; The West Australian alleged that Mao Zedong was so impressed by her that he "made it clear that a place was waiting for her as his consort". Annette's interests lay in the Australian communist movement, however, and she stood as a candidate for the Senate in 1955 and 1958 and for the House of Representatives in 1966. During the 1960s she was prominent in the anti-Vietnam War movement. Sam Aarons died in 1971 and Annette remarried Duncan Cameron, who was also an active communist; they were leading organisers of the Vietnam War moratoriums and campaigned for Aboriginal rights.

A long-time sufferer from multiple sclerosis, Annette Cameron died in 2008, three years after the death of her husband.
