= Della Elliott =

Australian trade unionist (1917–2011)

Della Elliott (née Kondelea Xenodohos; 23 December 1917 – 2 October 2011) was an Australian trade unionist.

Elliott was born Kondelea Xenodohos in Carlton in Melbourne, the daughter of Nicholaos and Agnes Xenodohos. and had to leave school at fourteen to assist in supporting her family. She then received a scholarship to Charters' Business College, from which she graduated as a shorthand typist in 1932. She had difficulty finding work as a typist and worked as a housekeeper, cleaner and waitress, as well as for left-wing organisations, including Friends of the Soviet Union and the Militant Minority Movement. A self-identified socialist, she joined the Young Communist League and then the Communist Party of Australia.

She joined the Federated Clerks' Union in 1936, and was elected to the union's New South Wales central council in 1940. In 1942, she became the union's first woman organiser, based in Newcastle. In 1943, she became the union's first woman assistant secretary. She became known as Della Nicholas, adopting an Anglicised version of her father's given name. She resigned as assistant secretary in April 1948 due to intra-union conflict, though publicly citing "ill health". She was heavily involved in the campaign for equal pay for women, using her roles as a delegate to the New South Wales Trades and Labor Council and the Australian Council of Trade Unions to speak out about the issue. She served on the executive of the Trade Union Equal Pay Committee, chaired by Jessie Street, who was described as a "great friend" of Elliott.

She went to work for the Waterside Workers' Federation after leaving the Federated Clerks' Union, working as secretary to the union's general secretary, Jim Healy. She was in this role in 1949 when Healy was jailed for refusing to reveal the location of union money that had been withdrawn from the banks to help workers in the 1949 Australian coal strike. Elliott was later revealed to have hidden the money under her parents' house. In 1951, she was again involved in coordinating clandestine union donations for striking workers during the 1951 New Zealand waterfront dispute. After leaving the Waterside Workers' Federation, she worked for the Seamen's Union of Australia as administrator and editor of their journal, the Seamen's Journal, from 1955 until her retirement in 1988. She was a key figure in the union for many years: historian Diane Kirkby described her as "a highly skilled editor with a brilliant intellect", while Rowan Cahill stated upon her death that "for Della, the SUA was more than her place of work, more than an industrial organisation, more than a part of her politics...in many ways the union, the members and their families, were her extended family"

Later in life, she was involved in the establishment of the Jessie Street National Women's Library and helped historians with research, especially into trade union histories. She received a Premier's Award for Community Service in 2000 for her work for the MV Noongah Trust Fund, which supported the dependents of those killed in a 1969 ship sinking. Her "last act" was to gift a scholarship for indigenous students to The Women's College, University of Sydney.

She was married to Laurie Aarons from 1937 to 1945 and to Eliot Elliott, secretary of the Seamen's Union of Australia, from 1982 until his death in 1984. She had been in a long-term de facto relationship with Elliott for many years before their marriage.

A portrait of Elliott by Ivy Shore is on display in the National Portrait Gallery in Canberra.
