= Sonya Hanke =

- Born: 27 September 1933
- Died: 4 September 1993 (aged 59) Sydney, Australia
- Occupations: Pianist, pedagogue
- Instrument: Piano

Sonya Helen Hanke (27 September 1933 – 4 September 1993) was an Australian pianist and educator.

The daughter of Henry Aloysius Hanke, an Archibald- and Sulman prize-winning artist, and Emily Mortimer, she was born in Hunters Hill in Sydney. Hanke was educated at North Sydney Girls High School and the New South Wales State Conservatorium of Music, receiving diplomas in performance and teaching in 1951. In the following year, she won the open piano championship at the Sydney Eisteddfod and a Pedley, Woolley, McMenamin Trust scholarship. These funds enabled her to study at the Royal College of Music in London from 1953 to 1956; she received the Hopkinson Gold Medal for piano playing in her final year. She subsequently studied at the Accademia Musicale Chigiana in Siena with the help of a scholarship from the Italian government. Hanke also studied at the Accademia Nazionale di Santa Cecilia in Rome. She performed in Italy, Switzerland, France, Germany, Britain, Israel and the United States.

In 1959, she married Aldo Lucchetti, an agricultural scientist. The couple later separated. However, they spent the latter part of her life together.

She returned to Australia in 1974 and joined the keyboard department at the New South Wales State Conservatorium of Music in 1977, retiring in 1992. Her students included Kathryn Selby, David Howie, Lisa Moore, Corey McVicar and Michael Kieran Harvey.

She was an examiner for the Australian Music Examinations Board. She was known for her performances of music by Franz Liszt and contemporary Italian composers. In 1980, she became founding president of the South Pacific Liszt Society.

Hanke died in Sydney at the age of 59, of breast cancer.
