= Freda Robertshaw =

Australian artist (1916–1997)

Freda Rhoda Robertshaw
- Born: 1916; Sydney, Australia
- Died: 1997 (aged 80–81); Sydney, Australia
- Known for: Painting
- Movement: stylised art deco

Freda Rhoda Robertshaw (1916–1997) was an Australian artist and painter of neoclassical figures and landscapes. Her works are represented in major Australian public galleries, and her Standing Nude (1944) was considered a key attraction at a 2001 exhibition of Modern Australian Women at the Art Gallery of New South Wales.

== Biography ==
Born in Sydney in November 1916. Her parents had migrated from England during WWI. She attended primary school in Rose Bay, Darlinghurst and Paddington before attending high school in Burwood. At age 16, she left school and she enrolled at the East Sydney Technical College. She studied in their commercial art program until 1937, studying drawing, life drawing, oil painting and watercolour.

Robertshaw wanted to compete for the NSW Travelling Scholarship, which required figure painting. To learn more about figure painting she became an apprentice and partner of artist Charles Meere who had been her life drawing teacher. Both were conservative academic artists, painting the human figure in a studied neoclassical style. Some of Robertshaw's paintings from this period have been mistaken for Meere's work. Meere's studio was in the same building as the studio of Max Dupain and the offices of Art in Australia.

== Works ==
Robertshaw began painting moody landscapes, but turned to more modernist ideas, influenced by school and her surroundings.

In 1940 she painted Australian Beach Scene (1940), a feminised response to Meere's famous 1940 work Australian Beach Pattern. In Robertshaws' work, the gender roles are reversed and women subjects predominate. This could reflect the changing Australian society as WWII evolved in 1940.

In 1940, the arts writer for The Bulletin declared that Robertshaw's nude painting "the best in the show".

In 1944 (also attributed as 1938), Robertshaw completed a standing nude self-portrait which she submitted to the New South Wales Travelling Art Scholarship competition. This was her third and last attempt at the competition. The painting reflects her training, with classical modelling, and composition over colour. And at the time there was no controversy about her nudity, probably because the figure is somewhat impassive.

Robertshaw was the first Australian woman artist to paint a fully nude self-portrait with Standing Nude (1944), which was also her last figure painting, representing her break from Meere's influence. Standing Nude was regarded as "the star attraction" of the 2001 Modern Australian Women exhibition, which debuted at the Art Gallery of South Australia. After completing this work, Robertshaw left Meere's studio.

She established a commercial art business but business was not great. In 1944 Robertshaw began to work freelance for the advertising firm L. B. Rennie, and she worked for them for the rest of her life.

Robertshaw returned to painting landscape and later experimented with landscape and surrealism; one of her surrealist works, Composition (1947), was acquired by the National Gallery of Australia.

In August 2023, The Bushwalkers was identified, having been collected by a grandparent of a family living in the Blue Mountains of New South Wales. The family decided it should be donated to the National Gallery of Australia rather than being sold at auction.

== Exhibitions ==
Robertshaw exhibited widely including at the New South Wales Society of Artists and the Royal Artists Society. Her works have also been included in several major Australian survey exhibitions.

In 2000 and 2001 her work was included in the exhibition Modern Australian Women: Paintings and Prints 1925–1945, developed by the Art Gallery of South Australia and then sent out as a touring exhibition.

In 2005, she was represented in Heaven on Earth, Visions of Arcadia, Hazelhurst Regional Gallery and Arts Centre.

In 2020 Robertshaw was represented in the exhibition Know My Name, Australian Women Artists 1900 to today, at the National Gallery of Australia.

== Collections ==
Robertshaw works are held in the Art Gallery of New South Wales, the National Gallery of Australia, the Gruthers Collection of Women's Art, The University of Western Australia, Perth, the collection of the National Art School, and the Art Gallery of South Australia.

In 1998, Australian Beach Scene (1940), a feminised response to Meere's famous 1940 work Australian Beach Pattern, sold at Sotheby's for $A475,500, a record for an Australian woman artist at the time.
