= Graeme Inson =

Australian artist (1923–2000)

Graeme Charles Inson (8 February 1923 – 2000) was an Australian artist, best known as a portraitist. He was a regular contributor to Archibald contests and a frequent finalist.

== History ==
Inson was born at the Inson residence "Inglebrae", Cootamundra, only son of Charles Henry Inson (6 April 1887 – 6 April 1934), co-owner with Mat Ryan of Ryan & Inson's department store. His mother was Lila Inson née Kirley.

He attended Canberra Grammar School, where he excelled at art, then studied under Max Meldrum in Melbourne, gaining a high degree of fluency in Meldrum's theory of tonal impressionism.

In 1955 he established his own teaching studio in Sydney. He was a friend of Henry Hanke and Ivy Shore, with whom he shared a studio in Sussex Street.

He was a prolific painter, and held a great number of one-man exhibitions. At one show, held at the Brisbane Town Gallery, every one of his paintings was sold before the show opened.

His paintings are held by most state galleries in Australia, the National collections and other public galleries.

== Awards ==
- Troy Roche Prize, Tumut NSW, 1961
- Royal Agricultural Society Easter Show, Sydney, 1966
- Sir Charles Lloyd Jones Memorial Prize for Portraiture
- Rural Bank Prize for Landscape
- Rothman Prize for Still-life

== Representative paintings ==
- Gough Whitlam, held by the National Portrait Gallery
- William Morrow, held by the Royal Prince Alfred Hospital

== Publications ==
- Peter O'Shaughnessy, Graeme Inson, and Russel Ward, The Restless Years – Being Some Impressions of the Origin of the Australian, The Jacaranda Press (1968), ASIN: B004H4EYJI.
