= Lance Sharkey =

Australian communist (1898–1967)

Lawrence Sharkey
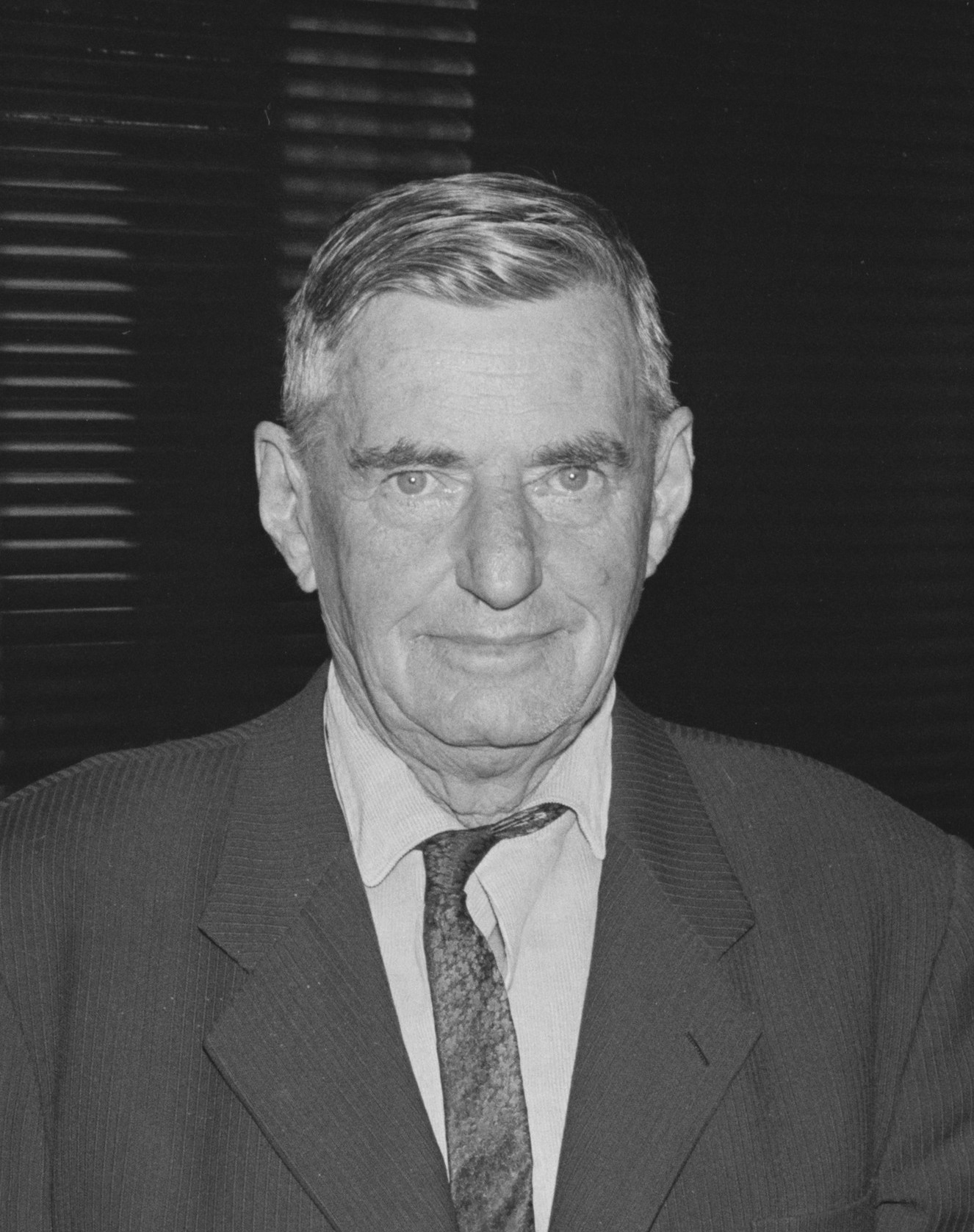
- Lance Sharkey in 1965

General Secretary of the Communist Party of Australia
- In office 12 May 1948 – 5 June 1965
- President: Richard Dixon
- Preceded by: Jack Miles
- Succeeded by: Laurie Aarons

Personal details
- Born: Lawrence Louis Sharkey; 19 August 1898 Warree Creek, New South Wales Colony
- Died: 13 May 1967 (aged 68) Sydney, New South Wales, Australia
- Cause of death: Atherosclerosis
- Party: Communist
- Height: 168 cm (5 ft 6 in)
- Spouse: Catherine Sharkey
- Parent(s): Michael Sharkey; Mary Teefy
- Occupation: Farmer

Lawrence Louis Sharkey (19 August 1898 – 13 May 1967), commonly known as Lance Sharkey or L. L. Sharkey, was an Australian trade unionist and communist leader. From 1948 to 1965, he served as the secretary-general of Communist Party of Australia (CPA). Sharkey was a devotee of the Soviet Union throughout his political career, closely following the prevailing Soviet line in each major turn of policy.

== Biography ==
=== Early years ===
Lawrence Sharkey was born on 18 August 1898 at Warree Creek, near Cargo, via Orange, New South Wales. His farming parents, Michael and Mary, were Irish and raised him as a Roman Catholic: a religious background he would share with numerous other Australian communist officials. He left school when only 14 years old, and commenced an apprenticeship as a coachmaker in Orange. Later he worked as a farmhand, claiming that itinerant bushworkers drew him into the anti-conscription struggle during World War I and into support of the Industrial Workers of the World.

After World War I, Sharkey moved to Sydney and obtained a job as a lift attendant, also becoming a militant activist in the Sydney Federated Miscellaneous Workers Union. In 1922, Sharkey became a member of the Communist Party of Australia. He was elected to the executive of the Miscellaneous Workers' Union, but lost that post in another election in 1925. In 1928, he became a union delegate to the Labor Council of New South Wales.

=== Political career ===
By that stage, Sharkey had been a member of the Communist Party of Australia (CPA) for four years. Elected to the executive of the CPA in 1926, he was dismissed from it the following year, when he resisted the change from a "united front" with the Australian Labor Party (ALP).

In 1928, Sharkey re-emerged as a strong advocate of the Comintern's new "Third Period" line of opposition to all types of reform. He was elected to the CPA's governing Central Committee and rose to prominence in the party, alongside his factional allies Bert Moxon and J. B. Miles. After they won control of the party in 1929, Sharkey was appointed editor of the party's newspaper Workers' Weekly. He continued to edit that paper and another party publication, The Tribune, throughout the 1930s.

Sharkey was named chairman of the CPA in 1930. He remained in that post without interruption until 1948, despite the twists and turns of party policy during that period.

In the summer of 1930, Sharkey visited the Soviet Union for the first time as one of the Australian party's representatives to the 5th World Congress of the Red International of Labor Unions (RILU). At the 7th World Congress of the Comintern, Sharkey was elected as an alternate to the Executive Committee of the Communist International (ECCI).

When Prime Minister Sir Robert Menzies declared the CPA illegal in June 1940, Sharkey and other party leaders went underground. A year later, Nazi Germany invaded the Soviet Union, and the Soviet Union entered the Second World War as an ally of Britain. The ban on members of the CPA was accordingly relaxed, and Sharkey resumed open political activity. In 1942, the ban was removed completely.

With the onset of the Cold War Sharkey displaced Miles as the CPA's secretary-general. The CPA became openly hostile to the ALP, and withdrew its previous conditional support of the American-sponsored program of post-war reconstruction.

==== General Secretary ====
At the 15th National Congress of the Communist Party of Australia, held in Sydney from 7 to 10 May 1948, Sharkey was elected general secretary. He took over from Jack Miles who stood down from nomination.

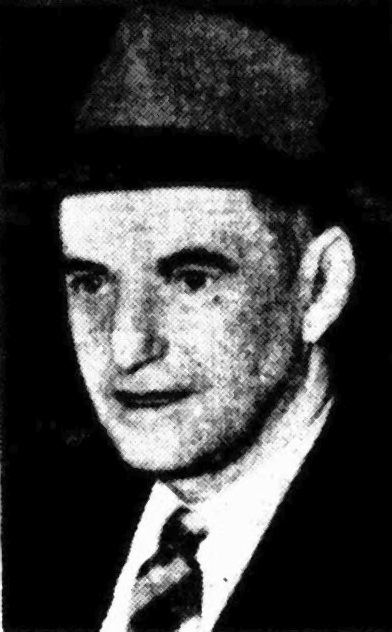
Portrait of Lance Sharkey at the time of his conviction for sedition in 1949.

In March 1949, Sharkey told a journalist for the Sydney Daily Telegraph that "if Soviet Forces in pursuit of aggressors entered Australia, Australian workers would welcome them." For this statement Sharkey was tried and convicted of sedition. The High Court upheld his conviction and he was sentenced to three years imprisonment, but eventually served a total of 13 months.

On his release, he undertook a national speaking tour. He then spent six months at a sanatorium in the Soviet Union, for treatment of a heart condition. Under his strong leadership he was able to ensure that the CPA did what many other countries' Communist parties failed to do, and minimised the impact of Nikita Khrushchev's repudiation of Joseph Stalin early in 1956, and of the Soviet invasion of Hungary later that year.

In November 1960, Sharkey attended the Meeting of 81 Communist and Workers Parties in Moscow, at which the CPA initially sympathised with the Chinese in the Sino-Soviet split. Ultimately, though, it backed the Soviets. Eleven months afterwards, Sharkey attended the 22nd Congress of the Communist Party of the Soviet Union in Moscow.

=== Later years, death, and legacy ===
On 9 June 1965, Sharkey's resignation as general secretary of the Communist Party, due to ill-health, was accepted, and he was replaced by Laurie Aarons. Thereafter, he held the ceremonial post of the party's vice-chairman. He died of a heart attack in Sydney on 13 May 1967, and his body was cremated.

Sharkey was lauded by many in his wartime and post-war heyday as a hero, but his reputation sank during the 1960s, along with the fortunes of the Communist Party as a whole. In a 1999 book, the historian of Australian Communism, Stuart Macintyre, who had long since abandoned his own CPA membership, noted the hyperbolic way in which Sharkey was portrayed during the cult of personality period of the 1930s:

"[Sharkey] was presented as a son of the soil, steeped in communist theory, yet always a man of the people. The list of his virtues was directed so unerringly to his limitations as to suggest parody. It was noted that 'like all the leaders of our Party, Comrade Sharkey was temperate in his habits'; in fact his binges in Moscow were notorious. He was a brilliant mass agitator; actually his oratory was leaden. He had an instinctive genius; yet when he took up Lenin's favourite pastime of chess, lesser party members had to be careful to lose."

== Writings ==
- Nationalisation of Banking and Socialisation of Credit: A Critical Analysis of the Policy of the Labour Party, from a Lecture delivered in May 1933. Sydney: Communist Party of Australia, 1933.
- Nationalisation of Banking: An Analysis of the Socialisation of Credit: Lang's Part in the Signing of the Premiers' Plan. Sydney: Modern Publishers, 1933.
- An Appeal to Catholics: Democracy, Fascism, Mexico, Spain, Peace, War. Sydney: Modern Publishers, n.d. [1938].
- Democracy for Whom? A striking Contrast: Democracy in Australia and the Soviet Union. Sydney: Central Committee, Communist Party of Australia, n.d. [c. 1941].
- Manifesto: Communist Call to Defend Australia. Melbourne: Political Rights Committee, n.d. [c. 1942].
- History: Communist Party of Australia, from a lecture by L. Sharkey. Twenty years of the Communist International. With Otto Kuusinen. Sydney: Communist Party of Australia, 1942.
- The Trade Unions: Communist Theory and Practice of Trade Unions. Sydney: N.S.W. Legal Rights Committee, 1942.
- Growth of Trade Unionism in Australia. n.c.: n.p., 1942.
- Australia Marches On. Sydney: N.S.W. Legal Rights Committee, 1942.
- The Soviet and the Japanese War. Sydney: N.S.W. Legal Rights Committee, 1942.
- For National Unity and Victory over Fascists, LIft Communist Party Ban. Sydney: Legal Rights Committee, n.d. [c. 1943].
- The left, "Dr." Lloyd Ross and Nationalisation. Sydney: Legal Rights Committee, 1943.
- Congress Report on the Work of the C.C. from the 12th to the 13th Party Congress. Sydney: Communist Party of Australia, 1943.
- A Reply to Father Ryan. Sydney: Communist Party of Australia, 1943
- An Outline History of the Australian Communist Party. Sydney: Communist Party of Australia, 1944.
- The W.E.A. Exposed: And an Exposition of the Principles of Democracy and Marxian Socialism. Sydney: Communist Party of Australia, 1944.
- Results of the Victory over Fascism. Sydney: Central Committee, Australian Communist Party, 1945.
- The Story of Government Enterprise in Australia. With E.W. Campbell. Sydney: Communist Party of Australia, 1945.
- Dialectical and historical materialism: Quotations from the Works of Marx, Engels, Plekhanov, Lenin and Stalin. With S. Moston. Sydney: Current Book Distributors, 1945.
- Labour Betrayed! Sydney: Current Book Distributors, 1946.
- Australian Communists and Soviet Russia. Sydney: Current Book Distributors, 1947.
- For Australia, Prosperous and Independent: The report of L.L. Sharkey to the 15th Congress of the Australian Communist Party, May 1948. Sydney: Current Book Distributors, 1948.
- The Labor Party Crisis. Sydney: Communist Party of Australia, n.d. [c. 1952].
- Petrov's 25,000 Dollar Story Exploded: The Devastating Answer to Petrov's "Moscow Gold" Story as Presented to the Petrov Commission. With Edward F. Hill. Newtown: R. S. Thompson, n.d. [c. 1955].
- Basic Questions of Communist Theory: Documents Relating to the Cult of the Individual and to Hungary. Sydney: Current Book Distributors, 1957.
- Socialism in Australia: Communist View on Democratic Socialism. Sydney: Current Book Distributors, 1957.
- Socializm v Avstralii. (In Russian). Moscow: Gospolitizdat, 1958.
- 18th Congress, April 1958 : Report of L.L. Sharkey, General Secretary. Sydney: Current Book Distributors, 1958.
- The Trade Unions. Sydney: Current Book Distributors, 1959.

== Footnotes ==
Party political offices
Preceded by Jack Miles	General Secretary of the Communist Party of Australia; May 1948–1965	Succeeded by Laurie Aarons
