= Richard Dixon (communist) =

Australian trade unionist and political activist

- Born: Clifton Reginald Walker; 26 May 1905; Forbes, New South Wales
- Died: 7 March 1976 (aged 70); Bankstown, New South Wales
- Education: International Lenin School
- Organization: Australian Railways Union
- Political party: Communist Party of Australia
- Spouse: Dorothy Jean Button

Richard Dixon, born Clifton Reginald Walker (26 May 1905 – 7 March 1976) was an Australian trade unionist who served as national president of the Communist Party of Australia from 1948 to 1972.

== Biography ==
He was born at Forbes to miner Henry Kidd Walker and Emily, née Wilmott, although the family soon moved to Lithgow. Reginald, as he was known, left school at fourteen and worked at a bicycle shop and then at a post office. He joined the New South Wales Government Railways and Tramways in 1925 and briefly joined the Australian Labor Party, although he was quickly drawn to the Communist Party of Australia (CPA). Moving to Sydney in 1928 to work at the railway parcels office, he became secretary of the CPA's Sydney branch in 1929, as well as secretary of the local branch of the Australian Railways Union. A supporter of independence from the Labor Party, he was involved in a successful push for leadership change in 1929 led by Lance Sharkey and Jack Miles, which brought with it a berth on the party's central executive committee, a position he held until 1974.

In January 1931, Walker embarked on a visit to the Soviet Union, attending the International Lenin School in Moscow. He returned to Australia in March 1933 and changed his name to Richard Dixon in an attempt to evade the attention of the security service, which had labelled him a "dangerous revolutionary". He became the CPA's general secretary in 1937. On 25 March 1939 he married Dorothy Jean Button at the registry office in North Sydney. He was elected national president of the CPA in 1948. In 1945 he attacked the White Australia policy as racist and offensive, and he represented the CPA at the Petrov royal commission in 1954. Although loyal to the Soviet Union, he agreed with the CPA's independent stance in the 1960s and disagreed with the 1968 invasion of Czechoslovakia. Dixon retired as national president of the CPA in 1972 and died in 1976 of hypertensive cardiovascular disease at Bankstown.
