= Lisa Moore (musician) =

Lisa Moore (born 1960) is an Australian pianist based in New York City.

Moore was born in Canberra, Australia, one of three children to an art historian and a prominent economist. Her early life included overseas travel, and by the age of 16 she had visited more than a dozen countries and lived in Sydney and London. Her development as an artist can be traced to her formative years in Canberra during the 1970s. A succession of "strange and interesting people" through her childhood included the Australian painter Charles Blackman. Moore was raised in both Australia and London (1971–73). She studied piano at the Sydney Conservatorium from 1976 until 1980 before moving to the US to complete her musical training. With an Alliance Française grant, Moore spent a year (1982–83) in Paris before moving back to the US and settling in New York City in 1985.

Moore is a graduate of the University of Illinois (BMus), Eastman School of Music (MMus), and SUNY Stony Brook (DMA). Her past piano teachers include Gilbert Kalish, David Burge, Yvonne Loriod, Benjamin Kaplan, Albert Landa, Sonya Hanke, Alan Jenkins, Wilma McKeown, and Larry Sitsky.

Moore's solo discs have been published on Cantaloupe Music, Philip Glass's Orange Mountain Music, Irreverence Group Music, Bandcamp, and Tall Poppies Records, with music ranging from Leoš Janáček to Philip Glass. Her 2016 disc The Stone People (Cantaloupe) – featuring the music of John Luther Adams, Martin Bresnick, Missy Mazzoli, Kate Moore, Frederic Rzewski, and Julia Wolfe – made both The New York Times Top Classical Albums 2016 and the 2017 Naxos Critics' Choice listings. Moore has recorded over thirty collaborative discs (Sony Classical Records, Nonesuch Records, Deutsche Grammophon, BMG, New World Records, ABC Classics, Albany Records, New Albion, Starkland, Harmonia Mundi). Her Steve Reich Music for Eighteen Musicians (Harmonia Mundi) with Ensemble Signal was listed on The New York Times Top Classical Albums 2015.

Moore is a Steinway Artist.

== Discography (selection) ==
- 1994: Stroke, Australian Piano Music Collection (Tall Poppies)
- 1995: Leoš Janáček, Janáček Piano Music (Tall Poppies)
- 2001: Elena Kats-Chernin, Purple Black and Blues] (Tall Poppies)
- 2003: Frederic Rzewski, Which Side Are You On? (Cantaloupe Music)
- 2009: Don Byron, Seven (Cantaloupe Music)]
- 2011: Annie Gosfield Lightning Slingers and Dead Ringers (Cantaloupe Music)]
- 2012: Donnacha Dennehy Stainless Staining (Cantaloupe Music)]
- 2015: Philip Glass, Solo Piano – Metamorphosis & Mad Rush (Orange Mountain)
- 2016: The Stone People (Cantaloupe Music)
- 2018: Julian De La Chica, Preludes Op. 8 (Irreverence Group Music)
- 2022: No Place to Go but Around, five pieces by Rzewski (Cantaloupe Music)
