= Sam Aarons =

Australian radical activist and communist

Samuel Aarons
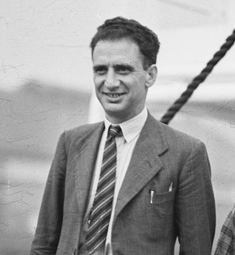
- A photograph of Sam Aarons in 1939

Personal details
- Born: 21 October 1895 Prahran, Victoria, Australia
- Died: 10 January 1971 (aged 75) Perth, WA, Australia
- Cause of death: Heart Attack
- Party: Communist Party of Australia
- Children: 3
- Occupation: Public Servant; Shoemaker

Samuel Aarons (21 October 1895 – 10 January 1971) was an Australian radical activist and communist.

== Early life ==
He was born in Prahran, Melbourne on the 21st of October 1895, to Louis and Jane Aarons (née Hyam), who passed on their radical politics to their son.

== Biography ==
Sam joined the Australian Labor Party at the age of sixteen and was an anti-war campaigner during World War I. This activism led to his sacking from his job at the Customs Department, and he was injured during a 1916 march to the Victorian Parliament. Although his parents were founding members of the Communist Party of Australia (CPA) in 1920, Sam instead established a chain of shoe repair stores in Sydney, although he did eventually join the CPA in 1930. He led a workers' delegation to the Soviet Union in 1934 and recruited a young unionist, Jim Healy, to the CPA; Healy would be one of the most significant unionists of his time.

Aarons fought in the Spanish Civil War on the republican side, not leaving until the collapse of the Republic began in 1938. Upon his return to Australia, Aarons embarked upon a speaking tour advocating for Spanish democracy. He remained active in communist affairs, but stood as an independent in the 1941 New South Wales state election for the western Sydney seat of Granville, where he only received 4.5%.

Later he became Western Australian State Secretary and a longtime member of the Central Committee. He retired in 1968. Aarons had three sons: two, Laurie and Eric, by his first wife, and a third, Gerald, by his second wife, Annette Moore.
