= Electoral district of Granville =

Granville New South Wales—Legislative Assembly
- Interactive map of district boundaries from the 2023 state election
- State: New South Wales
- Dates current: 1894–1920, 1927–present
- MP: Julia Finn
- Party: Labor Party
- Namesake: Granville
- Electors: 53,545 (2019)
- Area: 22.64 km^{2} (8.7 sq mi)
- Demographic: Inner-metropolitan
Electorates around Granville:
Winston Hills	Parramatta	Parramatta
Prospect	Granville	Auburn
Fairfield	Fairfield	Auburn

Granville is an electoral district of the Legislative Assembly in the Australian state of New South Wales in Sydney's West. It is currently represented by Julia Finn of the Labor Party.

== Geography ==
On its current boundaries, Granville includes the suburbs of Guildford, Guildford West, Holroyd, Merrylands, Merrylands West, South Granville, Woodpark, and part of Chester Hill, Granville, Greystanes, Mays Hill, Parramatta, Smithfield, South Wentworthville Wentworthville, Westmead and Yennora .

== History ==
Granville was first established in 1894, partly replacing part of Central Cumberland. In 1920, with the introduction of proportional representation, it was absorbed into Parramatta. Granville was recreated in 1927. It has historically tended to be a Labor seat.

== Members for Granville ==
First incarnation (1894–1920)
Member	Party	Term
George Smailes	Labor	1894–1898
John Nobbs	Free Trade	1898–1901
John Nobbs	Liberal Reform	1901–1913
Jack Lang	Labor	1913–1920
Second incarnation (1927–present)
Member	Party	Term
Bill Ely	Labor	1927–1932
Claude Fleck	United Australia	1932–1938
Bill Lamb	Labor	1938–1940
Bill Lamb	Labor (N-C)	1940–1941
Bill Lamb	Labor	1941–1962
Pat Flaherty	Labor	1962–1984
Laurie Ferguson	Labor	1984–1990
Kim Yeadon	Labor	1990–2007
David Borger	Labor	2007–2011
Tony Issa	Liberal	2011–2015
Julia Finn	Labor	2015–present

== Election results ==
2023 New South Wales state election: Granville
Party	Candidate	Votes	%	±%
Labor	Julia Finn	27,163	55.8	+4.3
Liberal	Anm Masum	9,766	20.1	−15.4
Independent	Charbel Saad	3,907	8.0	+8.0
Liberal Democrats	John Hadchiti	3,792	7.8	+7.8
Greens	Janet Castle	2,755	5.7	+1.5
Animal Justice	Rohan Laxmanalal	1,304	2.7	+1.6
Total formal votes		48,687	94.1	−0.5
Informal votes		3,074	5.9	+0.5
Turnout		51,761	83.2	−3.4
Two-party-preferred result
Labor	Julia Finn	30,413	71.5	+12.1
Liberal	Anm Masum	12,123	28.5	−12.1
Labor hold		Swing	+12.1	
