= David Borger =

Australian politician (born 1969)

Minister for Western Sydney
- In office 8 September 2008 – 28 March 2011
- Premier: Nathan Rees; Kristina Keneally
- Preceded by: Barbara Perry
- Succeeded by: Barry O'Farrell

Minister for Roads
- In office 21 May 2010 – 28 March 2011
- Premier: Kristina Keneally
- Preceded by: David Campbell (as Minister for Transport and Roads)
- Succeeded by: Duncan Gay (as Minister for Ports and Roads)

Minister for Housing
- In office 8 September 2008 – 21 May 2010
- Premier: Nathan Rees; Kristina Keneally
- Preceded by: Matt Brown
- Succeeded by: Frank Terenzini

Lord Mayor of Parramatta
- In office September 2005 – September 2007
- Preceded by: Julia Finn
- Succeeded by: Paul Barry Barber
- In office September 1999 – September 2000
- Preceded by: Paul Garrard
- Succeeded by: Lorraine Wearne

Member of the New South Wales Parliament for Granville
- In office 24 March 2007 – 26 March 2011
- Preceded by: Kim Yeadon
- Succeeded by: Tony Issa

Personal details
- Born: David Lawrence Borger; 7 September 1969 (age 56)
- Party: Labor Party
- Spouse: Giselle Borger
- Children: 2 daughters
- Education: University of Sydney
- Occupation: Executive Director of the Western Sydney Business Chamber

David Lawrence Borger (born 7 September 1969) is an Australian former politician. He represented the seat of Granville for the Labor Party in the New South Wales Legislative Assembly from 2007 until 2011. Borger was Minister for Roads, Housing and Minister for Western Sydney in the Rees and Keneally Labor Governments. Borger currently serves as the executive director of Business Western Sydney.

== Early years ==
Borger was an elected member of the Parramatta City Council, representing the Elizabeth Macarthur Ward, from 1995 to 2008. At 30 years of age, Borger became the youngest person to hold the office of Lord Mayor of Parramatta. Borger served as Lord Mayor for two terms (1999–2000 and 2005–2007).

== State politics ==
Following the retirement of Kim Yeadon, Borger won endorsement and then election for the seat of Granville at the 2007 state election. Borger lost his seat at the 2011 state election to his Liberal opponent Tony Issa.

In the Rees and Keneally Labor Governments, Borger was appointed to the following ministerial portfolios:

- Minister for Western Sydney (2008–2011)
- Minister for Housing (2008–2009)
- Minister Assisting the Minister for Transport and Roads (2009–2010)
- Minister for Roads (2010–2011)

== Post-politics ==
Borger was appointed the inaugural Western Sydney Director of the Sydney Business Chamber in September 2012. The position has since evolved to become executive director of Business Western Sydney and, as of 2026, Borger continues to hold the role.

In December 2024, Borger was appointed president of the Museum of Applied Arts and Science's (Powerhouse Museum) trust.

New South Wales Legislative Assembly
| Preceded by Kim Yeadon | Member for Granville; 2007–2011 | Succeeded by Tony Issa |
