= Julia Finn =

Australian politician

Julia Finn MP

Member of the New South Wales Parliament for Granville
- Incumbent
- Assumed office 28 March 2015
- Preceded by: Tony Issa

Parliamentary Secretary to the Premier and for the Arts
- Incumbent
- Assumed office 26 April 2023
- Minister: Chris Minns (Premier); John Graham (Arts)
- Preceded by: Gabrielle Upton (as Parliamentary Secretary to the Premier)

Lord Mayor of Parramatta
- In office September 2004 – September 2005
- Preceded by: Paul Garrard
- Succeeded by: David Borger

Councillor of the City of Parramatta for Arthur Phillip Ward
- In office 1999–2012

Personal details
- Born: c.1973
- Party: Labor Party
- Education: University of Sydney, Macquarie University, RMIT

Julia Dorothy Finn is an Australian politician who is the member for Granville in the New South Wales Legislative Assembly. Finn is a member of the Labor's NSW Left faction.

== Career ==
Finn holds a master's degree in environmental science and worked previously for the government of New South Wales Department of Energy, Utilities and Sustainability.

Finn served on Parramatta City Council from 1999 to 2012. She became lord mayor in 2004 at the age of thirty-one. In this role, she committed the council to water conservation measures during the millennium drought and expanded the Sydney Festival program at Parramatta, with the council becoming a sponsor.

She was elected as the member for Granville for the Labor Party at the 2015 New South Wales state election. Finn voted no to the Reproductive Health Care Reform Bill 2019.

Finn was appointed Shadow Minister for Consumer Protection and Shadow Minister for Carers in the McKay shadow cabinet in July 2019. In June 2020, Finn temporarily stepped down from her portfolios after she was named in an internal party investigation into branch stacking issues. McKay did not sack Finn and the latter officially remained a shadow minister. In 2021, she was appointed as Shadow Minister for Sport and Youth in the Shadow Ministry of Chris Minns. She was not appointed to the Minns ministry but was appointed as a Parliamentary Secretary in 2023.

On 19 October 2023, Finn signed an open letter which condemned attacks against Israeli and Palestinian civilians during the Gaza war.

New South Wales Legislative Assembly
Preceded by Tony Issa	Member for Granville; 2015–present	Incumbent
