= Claude Fleck =

Australian politician

Claude Cropton Fleck (11 June 1889 – 23 July 1962) was an Australian politician.

He was born in Sydney to carpenter James William Fleck and Isabella Ellen, née McFarlane. He attended Cleveland Street Boys' High School before being apprenticed to a chemist; he was a registered pharmacist by 1910 and studied at the University of Sydney for his Bachelor of Medicine and Master of Surgery (1923). From 1926 to 1941 he served on Granville Council (mayor 1939–41). He served in the New South Wales Legislative Assembly from 1932 to 1938 as the United Australia Party member for Granville.

== Personal and death ==
Fleck married three times. Firstly, in 1923, he married Aimee Isabel Hinder, with whom he had a son. She died on 14 August 1939. In June 1940 he married Dorothy Isabel Hinder, who died on 5 June 1950. He next married Mary Cunninghame on 12 July 1952. Fleck died at Chatswood in 1962.

New South Wales Legislative Assembly
Preceded by Bill Ely	Member for Granville; 1932–1938	Succeeded by Bill Lamb
Civic offices
Preceded by John Sykes Fielding	Mayor of Granville; 1939–1941	Succeeded by Donald McFarlane
