= George Smailes =

Australian politician

Member of the New South Wales Parliament for Granville
- In office 17 July 1894 – 5 July 1898

Personal details
- Born: George Wells Smailes; 1 January 1862 Durham, England
- Died: 9 January 1934 (aged 72) Auckland, New Zealand
- Party: Labor Party
- Occupation: Clergyman

George Wells Smailes (1 January 1862 – 9 January 1934) was an Australian politician in the New South Wales parliament, representing the electoral district of Granville for Labor from 17 July 1894 to 5 July 1898, and was a Methodist minister. Later he was an Anglican vicar in New Zealand, and a chaplain with the New Zealand garrison in Samoa in World War I. He apparently changed his surname from Smailes to Wells-Smailes in New Zealand.

He was born in Durham, England. He moved to New South Wales in 1882, and to Sydney in 1891.

He moved to New Zealand in 1902, where he was an Anglican vicar at Te Aroha then Ōpōtiki. He was living at St Heliers, Auckland when he applied to be a chaplain in WWI, recommended by Arthur Myers an Auckland MP and former mayor. As there were no chaplain vacancies in the NZEF, he was sent as a chaplain (Army No. 19/2131) to Samoa He served with the Samoa Relief Force in 1915 for 213 days, from 30 March to 28 October. He was sent home early by Colonel Logan, and a confidential report by the Anglican Bishop of Auckland (who did not know him personally, as he was not a vicar in his diocese) to the Minister of Defence said he was an adventurer and "cad", He died in Auckland in 1934.

New South Wales Legislative Assembly
Preceded by First Election	Member for Granville; 1894 – 1898	Succeeded by John Nobbs
