= Bill Lamb =

Australian politician

The Honourable Bill Lamb
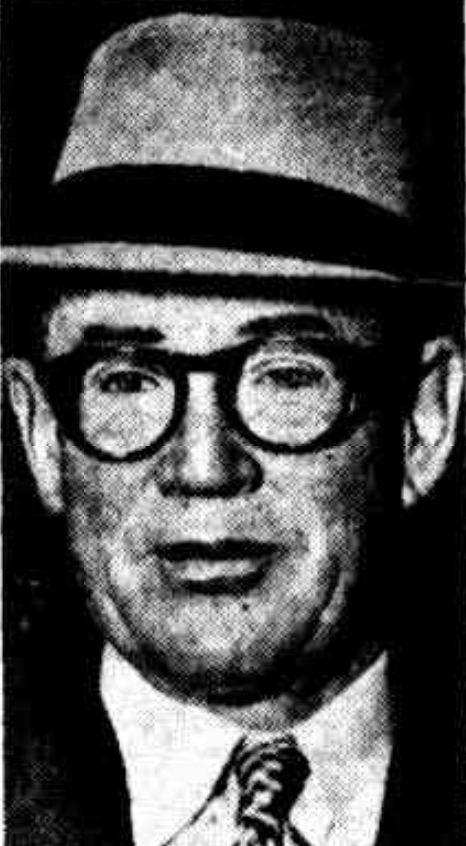
- Lamb circa 1953

21st Speaker of the New South Wales Legislative Assembly
- In office 28 May 1947 – 20 April 1959
- Premier: Jim McGirr; Joseph Cahill
- Deputy: George Booth
- Preceded by: Daniel Clyne
- Succeeded by: Ray Maher

18th Mayor of Auburn
- In office 10 December 1934 – 16 December 1935
- Deputy: Peter Herlihy
- Preceded by: Tom Cheetham
- Succeeded by: Peter Herlihy

Alderman of the Auburn Municipal Council
- In office 2 January 1932 – 16 October 1939
- Succeeded by: Thomas Ryan

Personal details
- Born: William Henry Lamb; 5 January 1889 Nyngan, Colony of New South Wales
- Died: 8 January 1964 (aged 75) Burwood, New South Wales, Australia
- Party: Labor Party, Australian Labor Party (Non-Communist)

William Henry Lamb (5 January 1889 – 8 January 1964) was an Australian politician. He was a member of the New South Wales Legislative Assembly from 1938 until 1962 and a member of the New South Wales Labor Party and the Lang Labor Party. He was the Speaker of the New South Wales Legislative Assembly between 1947 and 1959.

== Early life ==
Lamb was born in Nyngan, New South Wales. The son of a coachbuilder, Lamb was educated to elementary level at state schools—including one at the oil shale mining village of Airly—and from the age of 12 he worked as a grocer's boy and then as a coalminer. At age 19 he became a teacher in NSW rural schools and studied accountancy in his spare time. He was an office manager after 1927. A protégé of Jack Lang, Lamb was an alderman on Auburn Municipal Council from 1932 and was the mayor in 1935. As mayor in 1935, he was awarded the King George V Silver Jubilee Medal. In October 1939, having moved from Auburn to Granville, Lamb resigned as an alderman.

== Political career ==
At the 1938 state election, Lamb was elected to the New South Wales Legislative Assembly as the Labor member for the new seat of Granville. He defeated the sitting United Australia Party member, Claude Fleck. He was a supporter of Lang's Australian Labor Party (Non-Communist) during the party split of 1941 but did not support the later manifestations of Lang Labor.

== Speaker of the Legislative Assembly ==
Lamb succeeded Daniel Clyne as the Speaker of the New South Wales Legislative Assembly after the 1947 election and retained the position for twelve years. His time as speaker was characterised by his singular interpretation of standing orders and firm control, leading to frequent criticism from the opposition for inflexibility, unnecessary interjections from the chair and bias towards the government. Unusually for a serving speaker, Lamb often made contributions in committee stages of bills. Controversially he even opposed some of his government's legislation, including the Local Government (Areas) bill in 1948, calling it a "flagrant violation of the fundamental principles of the democratic system" which was a reference to the decision to amalgamate Granville Council into Parramatta instead of the other way round. He received the Queen Elizabeth II Coronation Medal in 1953.

Defeated in a caucus ballot for speaker in 1959, Lamb was granted retention of the "Honourable" title. Lamb retained his seat of Granville throughout his time in parliament but lost Labor Party pre-selection prior to the 1962 state election and retired. He did not live long outside of politics, dying on 8 January 1964, and was buried in Rookwood Cemetery.

New South Wales Legislative Assembly
Preceded by Claude Fleck	Member for Granville; 1938–1962	Succeeded by Pat Flaherty
Preceded by Daniel Clyne	Speaker of the New South Wales Legislative Assembly; 1947–1959	Succeeded by Ray Maher
Civic offices
Preceded by Tom Cheetham	Mayor of Auburn; 1934–1935	Succeeded by Peter Herlihy
