= Jack Miles (political activist) =

Scottish-born Australian politician (1888–1969)

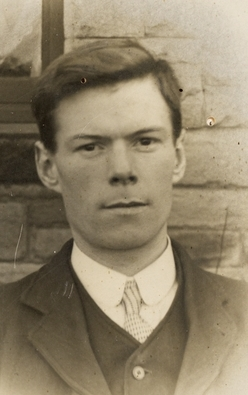

General Secretary of the Communist Party of Australia
- In office 1931 – 12 May 1948
- President: Lance Sharkey
- Preceded by: Herbert Moxon
- Succeeded by: Lance Sharkey

Personal details
- Born: John Bramwell Miles; 5 September 1888 Wilton, Roxburghshire, Scotland
- Died: 17 May 1969 (aged 80)
- Party: Communist Party of Australia
- Other political affiliations: Independent Labour Party
- Spouse: Elizabeth Jane Black (m. 1911)

John Bramwell Miles (5 September 1888 – 17 May 1969) was a Scottish-born Australian stonemason and communist leader.

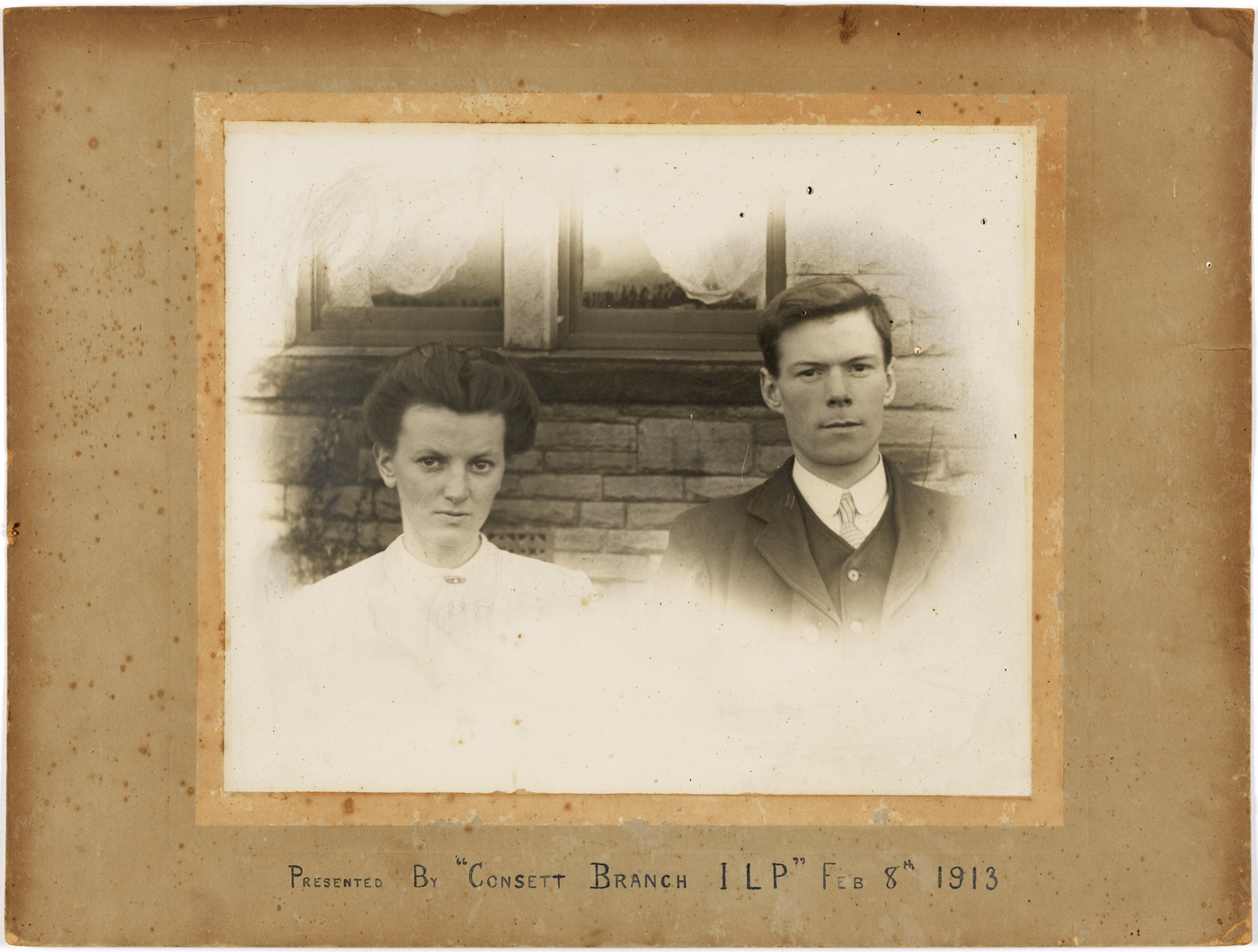
Elizabeth and Jack Miles February 1913

Miles was born at Wilton, Roxburghshire, Scotland, to journeyman mason William Miles and Louisa, née Wiggins. He was educated at Edinburgh and apprenticed to a stonemason in northern England. He was employed at Newcastle and then Consett in Durham, where he joined the Independent Labour Party. On 9 October 1911, he married Elizabeth Jane Black at Lanchester; the couple emigrated to Queensland and arrived in Brisbane on the Orama on 31 March 1913.

Miles was recruited to the Queensland Socialist League in 1918, and was a founding member of the Communist Party of Australia (CPA) in 1920. Employed as a meatworker from 1920 to 1923, he represented the Australian Meat Industry Employees' Union on the Trades and Labor Council before returning to stonemasonry and representing the United Operative Stonemasons' Society of Queensland. In the late 1920s, having risen to prominence in the CPA, he and Lance Sharkey won control on a platform of strong opposition to the Australian Labor Party's "social fascist" policies. Miles disliked middle-class communist converts, condemning Fred Paterson and John Anderson.

Miles visited the Soviet Union 1934–35 and on his return embarked on a national tour to promote the communist cause. During the early 1930s, he also had an affair with writer and fellow communist Jean Devanny. Miles adopted the pseudonym "A. Mason" after the CPA was banned in 1940, and re-emerged after the party was rehabilitated by the Soviet Union's entry into the war, but he was overshadowed by Sharkey. He was described by an ASIO officer in 1953 as the "Grand Old Man of Australian Communism", and remained firmly committed to the cause throughout the revelations concerning Stalinism in the early 1950s. He died at Naremburn in 1969 and was cremated.

Party political offices
Preceded by Herbert Moxon	General Secretary of the Communist Party of Australia; 1931–1948	Succeeded by Lance Sharkey
