= Sendy Pratama =

Indonesian footballer

Personal information
- Full name: Sendy Pratama
- Date of birth: January 4, 1997 (age 29)
- Place of birth: Bandung, Indonesia
- Height: 1.75 m (5 ft 9 in)
- Position: Midfielder

Youth career
- 2016: Persela Lamongan

Senior career*
Years	Team	Apps	(Gls)
2017	Persik Kediri	8	(2)
2018	Persela Lamongan	1	(0)
2019	Persatu Tuban	6	(1)
2020	Persekat Tegal	0	(0)

International career
2014	Indonesia U19	1	(0)
- * Club domestic league appearances and goals

Sendy Pratama (born January 4, 1997) is an Indonesian professional footballer who plays as a midfielder.

== Club career ==
=== Persekat Tegal ===
He was signed for Persekat Tegal to play in Liga 2 in the 2020 season.

== Career statistics ==
=== Club ===
As of match played 16 March 2020

Club	Season	League			Cup		Continental		Total	
Club	Season	Division	Apps	Goals	Apps	Goals	Apps	Goals	Apps	Goals
Persik Kediri	2017	Liga 2	8	2	0	0	0	0	8	2
Persela Lamongan	2018	Liga 1	1	0	0	0	0	0	1	0
Persatu Tuban	2019	Liga 2	6	1	0	0	0	0	6	1
Persekat Tegal	2020–21	Liga 2	0	0	0	0	0	0	0	0
Career total			15	3	0	0	0	0	15	3
