= Ivy Shore =

Australian artist (1915–1999)

Ivy Shore (14 January 1915 – 25 August 1999; known as Billie Shore; born Ivy Williams) was an Australian painter. Shore was a student of tonal impressionist Graeme Inson, and also Inson's partner for the last 40 years of her life. She was the 1979 winner of the Portia Geach Memorial Award, Australia's richest art award for women artists only. Shore also won the Most Highly Commended award in the Portia Geach Memorial Award three times.

Her award-winning portrait of activist Kondelea 'Della' Elliott is now in the Australian National Portrait Gallery collection in Canberra.
