= Charles Meere =

Australian artist (1890–1961)

Mathew Charles Meere (6 December 1890 – 17 October 1961), generally known as Charles Meere, was an English-born artist who studied art in England and France, served in World War I, and eventually settled in Australia in 1932. While pursuing his Sydney art practice, he also worked as a commercial artist, exhibited widely and taught life classes to students such as Freda Robertshaw. He achieved considerable artistic and commercial success, winning the Sulman Prize in 1938 with Atalanta's Eclipse, a neo-classical interpretation of the Greek myth. One of his colleagues described him as "somewhat of a character, slightly eccentric, looking like a businessman, with a droll sense of humour".

Meere's Chifley portrait and Gall's cartoon

In 1950 Meere sued Brisbane's Courier Mail for publishing an editorial cartoon by Ian Gall, which appropriated his signed portrait of Ben Chifley, implying that Chifley was being controlled by Jack Lang. Meere won the case, and in 1951 was awarded £800 for damages to his reputation as an artist.

Meere is best known for his stylised art deco paintings dating from the interwar period, most notably Australian Beach Pattern (1938–40). Alternately criticised or praised for its studied formality, this painting has been variously interpreted as a celebration of Australian beach culture, a glorification of heroic racial purity, or as a nuanced reflection of Australia's unpreparedness for World War II. It was among the quintessential Australian images chosen for the opening ceremony of the 2000 Summer Olympics program and was included in the major exhibition of Australian art held at London's National Gallery in 2013.

== Family ==
Meere married nurse Denise Moreau in 1919; they had a son, Desmond, in 1920.

He married again in Sydney, to Anne Carter; their son Michael John Meere, was born on 4 December 1938, but died before his first birthday.
