= Mark Aarons =

Australian journalist and author

- Born: 25 December 1951 (age 74); Newcastle, New South Wales, Australia
- Occupation: Journalist
- Father: Laurie Aarons

Mark Aarons (born 25 December 1951) is an Australian journalist and author. He was a political adviser to New South Wales Premier Bob Carr.

== Biography ==
Aarons was born in Newcastle, New South Wales, but he was brought up in Sydney. He was educated at Fairfield Boys High School and North Sydney Boys High School. He is the son of the late Laurie Aarons, former secretary of the Communist Party of Australia. Aarons was also a member of the Communist Party of Australia from 1969 to 1978, and a Young Communist organiser in 1977.

Aarons' activism started at North Sydney Boys High School in the mid-1960s, especially in organising students to protest the Vietnam War. His 1986 ABC radio documentary series Nazis in Australia prompted the Bob Hawke government's inquiry into war criminals and formation of Special Investigations Unit.

Aarons contends that right-wing authoritarian regimes and dictatorships backed by Western powers committed atrocities and mass killings that rival the Communist world, citing examples such as the Indonesian mass killings of 1965–66 and the killings associated with Operation Condor throughout South America.

== Bibliography ==
- Aarons, Mark & John Loftus (1991). Ratlines: How the Vatican's Nazi networks betrayed Western intelligence to the Soviets. William Heinemann.
- Aarons, Mark (1990). Sanctuary: Nazi Fugitives in Australia. Mandarin Australia.ISBN 1-863-30047-3
- Aarons, Mark & John Loftus (1992). Unholy Trinity: How the Vatican's Nazi networks betrayed Western intelligence to the Soviets (U.S. ed.). New York: St. Martin's Press.
- East Timor: A Western Made Tragedy, Sydney: Left Book Club, 1992.
- The Secret War Against the Jews: How Western Espionage Betrayed the Jewish People, with John Loftus, St. Martin's Press, 1994, ISBN 978-0-312-15648-0
- War Criminals Welcome: Australia, a Sanctuary for War Criminals Since 1945, Melbourne: Black Inc., 2001
- Aarons, Mark (March 2009). "The Nation Reviewed: Hideout". The Monthly. 43: 14–16.
- The Family File, Melbourne: Black Inc., 2010.
- Aarons, Mark (2010). "The Family File: ASIO, the Archives and the Aarons Family". Memento. Vol. 39. National Archives of Australia. pp. 19–21.
- Aarons, Mark (August 2010). "The Hollowmen". The Monthly. 59: 22–27.
- The Show: Another Side of Santamaria's Movement (co-authored with John Grenville), Melbourne: Scribe Publications, 2017.
