= Pat Flaherty (politician) =

Australian politician (1923–2013)

James Patrick Flaherty (12 December 1923 – 9 December 2013) was an Australian politician. He was a Labor Party member of the New South Wales Legislative Assembly from 1962 to 1984, representing the electorate of Granville.

Flaherty was born in Granville, and was educated at Blaxcell Street Public School and Marist Brothers High School, Parramatta. He was a carpenter and joiner by trade. He was an alderman on the City of Parramatta council from 1957 to 1962, serving as deputy mayor in 1960 and mayor in 1962.

Flaherty entered state politics at the 1962 state election, when he defeated the incumbent Labor MLA for the safe seat of Granville, Bill Lamb, for preselection. He was re-elected without difficulty on seven occasions, and retired at the 1984 state election, where he was replaced by future federal minister Laurie Ferguson.

New South Wales Legislative Assembly
Preceded by Bill Lamb	Member for Granville; 1962–1984	Succeeded by Laurie Ferguson
