= Kim Yeadon =

Australian politician

Kimberley ("Kim") Maxwell Yeadon (born 25 July 1956) is a former Australian politician, who served as a member of the New South Wales Legislative Assembly. from 1990 to 2007, representing the Electoral district of Granville as a member of the Labor Party.

== Early life and background ==
Yeadon was born in Goulburn, New South Wales, but was brought up in Western Sydney.

He was educated at Patrician Brothers' High School in Granville and received an Electrical Mechanics Certificate at Granville TAFE College, part of South Western Sydney Institute of TAFE. He attended the University of Sydney from 1982 and 1986 and received a BA. He was previously an electrician and trade union research officer.

== Political career ==
Yeadon represented Granville for the Labor Party from 1990 to 2007. He was Minister for Land and Water Conservation from May 1995 to December 1997 and Minister for Ports from December 1997 to April 1999. He was Minister for Information Technology and Minister for Forestry from December 1997 to April 2003 and Minister for Western Sydney and Minister for Energy and Utilities from April 1999 to April 2003.

== Later life ==
Yeadon was one of two deputy chancellors of the University of Western Sydney (now Western Sydney University) from 2008 to 2013. He had first joined the board in 2003, served three terms as a board member and was awarded an honorary degree by the university in 2014.

In 2010 he was controversially appointed to the boards of Delta Electricity and Erraring Energy in an emergency measure to ensure the companies' sale, after the boards of both entities had resigned en masse. It was reported that he had been advising on the sale process prior to this appointment. He was removed from both boards the following year after a change of Government.

New South Wales Legislative Assembly
Preceded by Laurie Ferguson	Member for Granville; 1990–2007	Succeeded by David Borger
