= Tony Issa =

Australian politician (1955–2025)

Tony Issa OAM
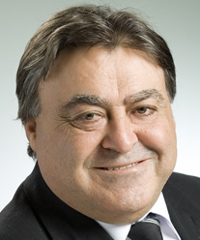

Member of the New South Wales Parliament for Granville
- In office 26 March 2011 – 6 March 2015
- Preceded by: David Borger
- Succeeded by: Julia Finn

Lord Mayor of Parramatta Council
- In office 29 September 2008 – September 2009
- Preceded by: Paul Barry Barber
- Succeeded by: Paul Garrard

Personal details
- Born: 14 August 1955 Barsa, Lebanon
- Died: 30 March 2025 (aged 69) Auburn, New South Wales, Australia
- Party: Liberal Party
- Spouse: Sue Issa
- Occupation: Self-employed

Antoine Khalil Issa OAM (14 August 1955 – 30 March 2025) was an Australian politician who was a member of the New South Wales Legislative Assembly representing Granville for the Liberal Party from 2011 until the 2015 election when he lost the seat to Labor's Julia Finn. Issa died in Auburn, New South Wales on 30 March 2025, at the age of 69.

== Early years and background ==
Issa migrated to Australia with his father in 1973, as one of seven children of Lebanese Maronite Catholic background. Issa has extensive community involvement including:

- President, Bkerkacha Charitable Association (1989)
- Treasurer, Granville Multicultural Centre (1984–1987)
- President, Granville Multicultural Centre (1987–1991)
- Board member, Australian Lebanese Welfare Group (2004–2008)
- School representative, Catholic Diocesan Parramatta Regional Council (c.1992)
- Member, Bicentenary Committee (1988)
- Member, Western Sydney Assistant Services Ranking Committee
- Board member, Western Sydney Regional Organisation of Councils (WSROC)
- Chairman, Sister City Organisation
- Representative, Finance Complaint Services Board
- Committee member, Our Lady of Lebanon Church, Sydney

== Local government career ==
Elected to Parramatta City Council in 1988, Issa served as an independent councillor until 1998 and then as a Liberal party councillor from 1998 to 2012.

Issa was elected as deputy mayor from 2000 to 2001 and became the first Liberal Party lord mayor in New South Wales, serving between 2008 and 2009.

== State political career ==
In 1994, Issa contested unsuccessfully as an independent in the Parramatta by-election.

In 2011, he contested the normally safe Labor seat of Granville in the Sydney's western suburbs. Running against the incumbent and high-profile sitting member and Minister, David Borger.

Issa was elected with a swing of 13.1 points and won the seat with 52.7 per cent of the two-party vote.

== Honours ==
Issa was awarded the Medal of the Order of Australia (OAM) in 1995 for service to local government and to the Lebanese community.

Issa was awarded the Order of Local Government for more than 20 years service as a councillor on Parramatta City Council.

New South Wales Legislative Assembly
| Preceded by David Borger | Member for Granville; 2011–2015 | Succeeded by Julia Finn |
