= Laurie Ferguson =

Australian politician

The Honourable Laurie Ferguson
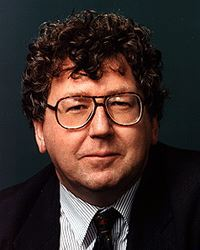

Member of the Australian Parliament for Werriwa
- In office 21 August 2010 – 9 May 2016
- Preceded by: Chris Hayes
- Succeeded by: Anne Stanley

Member of the Australian Parliament for Reid
- In office 24 March 1990 – 21 August 2010
- Preceded by: Tom Uren
- Succeeded by: John Murphy

Personal details
- Born: Laurence Donald Thomas Ferguson; 7 July 1952 (age 74) Sydney, New South Wales, Australia
- Party: Labor
- Spouse: Maureen Walsh
- Relations: Martin Ferguson (brother); Andrew Ferguson (brother); Jennifer (sister); Debborah (sister); Lynda Voltz (stepdaughter); Paul Lynch (brother in-law)
- Education: University of Sydney
- Occupation: Research officer

Laurie Donald Thomas Ferguson (born 7 July 1952) is a former Australian politician who was an Australian Labor Party member of the House of Representatives from March 1990, representing Reid until 2010 and Werriwa until May 2016, both in New South Wales.

== Early life and education ==
Laurie Ferguson grew up in Guildford, the eldest son of Mary Ellen and Jack Ferguson, who was deputy premier of New South Wales 1976–84. His brother Martin was also a federal MP. Both attended at St Patrick's College, Strathfield. His younger brother, Andrew, was the former NSW Secretary of the Construction Forestry Mining and Energy Union (Construction and General Division).

Ferguson was educated at the University of Sydney and was a research officer with the Federated Miscellaneous Workers' Union before entering politics.

== Career ==
He was the member for Granville in the New South Wales Legislative Assembly 1984–90.

In the federal Parliament, Ferguson was elected to the opposition shadow ministry in March 1996 and was Shadow Minister for Immigration in 2004–05. His handling of the debate around Petro Georgiou's private member's bill on asylum seekers was severely criticised and he was shifted to Shadow Minister for Consumer Affairs, Population Health and Health Regulation in June 2005. On the election of the Rudd Labor Government in 2007, Ferguson became Parliamentary Secretary for Multicultural Affairs and Settlement Services.

He was preselected to contest the south-western Sydney seat of Werriwa at the 2010 federal election after his existing seat of Reid was merged with neighbouring Lowe. Lowe MP John Murphy contested the redistributed Reid. He was not re-appointed to the Gillard Ministry after the election. Ferguson is a member of the Board of Advisors of the Global Panel Foundation-Australasia.

== Personal life ==
Ferguson is married to Maureen Walsh, a former councillor at Parramatta City Council in the Woodville Ward.

New South Wales Legislative Assembly
Preceded by Pat Flaherty	Member for Granville; 1984–1990	Succeeded by Kim Yeadon
Parliament of Australia
Preceded by Tom Uren	Member for Reid; 1990–2010	Succeeded by John Murphy
Preceded by Chris Hayes	Member for Werriwa; 2010–2016	Succeeded by Anne Stanley
