= John Sendy =

John Alan Sendy (1 June 1924 – 4 August 2004) was an Australian communist activist.

Sendy joined the Communist Party of Australia in 1942. He was a committed activist for many years in South Australia and Victoria, serving on the National Councils and studying communist theory in China and the Soviet Union. From 1972 to 1974 he was national president of the Communist Party. Sendy left the Communist Party in 1974 as part of the turmoil of that decade over the increasing brutality of Stalinism eventually exacerbated by the Soviet invasion of Czechoslovakia. In his retirement Sendy focused on writing and released an autobiography, Comrades Come Rally! Recollections of an Australian Communist, in 1978. He died in 2004.
