= Deaths in July 1995 =

The following is a list of notable deaths in July 1995.

Entries for each day are listed alphabetically by surname. A typical entry lists information in the following sequence:

- Name, age, country of citizenship at birth, subsequent country of citizenship (if applicable), reason for notability, cause of death (if known), and reference.

== July 1995 ==
=== 1 ===
- Paul Nguyễn Văn Bình, 84, Vietnamese prelate of the Catholic Church and first Archbishop of Saigon.
- Akanu Ibiam, 88, Nigerian medical missionary and politician.
- Wolfman Jack, 57, American disc jockey.
- Bruce Mitchell, 86, South African cricket opening batsman.
- Nikolay Peyko, 79, Russian composer and educator.
- Roger Dale Stafford, 43, American serial killer, execution by lethal injection.

=== 2 ===
- Bert Edwards, 80, Australian rules footballer.
- Menachem Mendel Futerfas, 87, Russian educator and rabbi.
- John C. Higgins, 87, Canadian-American screenwriter.
- Gervase Jackson-Stops, 48, British architectural historian and journalist.
- Zdeněk Košler, 67, Czech conductor.
- Lloyd MacPhail, 75, Canadian politician and 23rd Lieutenant Governor of Prince Edward Island.
- Geraint Morgan, 74, British lawyer and politician.
- George Seldes, 104, American investigative journalist.
- Krissy Taylor, 17, American model, asthma.
- Maria Vinogradova, 72, Russian actress.

=== 3 ===
- Charley Eckman, 73, American basketball coach and referee, colorectal cancer.
- Ricardo Alonso González, 67, American tennis champion, stomach cancer.
- Bert Hardy, 82, British photographer.
- Alexander Langer, 49, Italian journalist, peace activist, politician, and teacher, suicide.
- Eddie Mazur, 65, Canadian ice hockey player (Montreal Canadiens, Chicago Black Hawks).
- George Williams, 72, Australian rugby league footballer.
- Gil J Wolman, 65, French artist and member of the Ultra-Lettrist movement.

=== 4 ===
- Margaret F. Ackroyd, 87, American civil servant from Providence, Rhode Island.
- Andrew John Berger, 79, American ornithologist from the American Museum of Natural History.
- Arsen Diklić, 72, Serbian poet, novelist and film director.
- Seán Fallon, 57, Irish Fianna Fáil politician.
- Eva Gabor, 76, Hungarian-American actress (Green Acres, The Aristocats, The Rescuers) and socialite, pneumonia.
- Yevhen Hutsalo, 58, Ukrainian writer and journalist.
- Adeline Kerrar, 70, American baseball player.
- Bharat Rangachary, 41, Indian Bollywood film director and producer.
- Bob Ross, 52, American television painter (The Joy of Painting), lymphoma.
- Gilberto Bosques Saldívar, 102, Mexican diplomat.
- Åke Samuelsson, 81, Swedish footballer.
- Karim Sanjabi, 89, Iranian politician.

=== 5 ===
- Bernice Ackerman, 69–70, American meteorologist and first woman weathercaster in the U.S.
- Stepan Bakhayev, 73, Soviet Air Force major and flying ace.
- Renato Baldini, 73, Italian film actor.
- Viktoria Brezhneva, 86, wife of Soviet leader Leonid Brezhnev, diabetes.
- Christian Calmes, 81, Luxembourgish civil servant, lawyer, and historian.
- Johan Koren Christie, 85, Norwegian engineer and air force officer.
- John Dittrich, 62, American gridiron football player.
- Takeo Fukuda, 90, Japanese politician, 46th Prime Minister of Japan, pulmonary emphysema.
- Foster Furcolo, 83, American lawyer, writer, and politician.
- Jüri Järvet, 76, Estonian actor and theatre director.
- Ray Nolting, 81, American gridiron football player (Chicago Bears), and college football coach.

=== 6 ===
- Saidye Rosner Bronfman, 98, Canadian philanthropist and matriarch of the Bronfman family.
- Philip Clarke, 62, Irish politician, cyclist, and Irish Republican Army member.
- Colin Crampton, 62, Australian rules footballer.
- Horace Garner, 71, American baseball player.
- Aziz Nesin, 79, Turkish writer, heart attack.
- Howard Henry Peckham, 84, American historian.
- Eduardo Viso, 75, Spanish football player and football manager.

=== 7 ===
- Geoffrey Freeman Allen, 73, British writer on railways.
- Jean Bony, 86, French medieval architectural historian.
- Martin Bucksbaum, 74, American businessman and shopping center development pioneer.
- Dave Elliman, 93, Australian rules footballer.
- Marga Höffgen, 74, German contralto.
- Helene Johnson, 89, African-American poet during the Harlem Renaissance.
- Léon Le Calvez, 86, French bicycle racer.
- Eeva-Liisa Manner, 73, Finnish poet and playwright.
- Peter Murray-Willis, 84, English cricketer.
- Ralph Neves, 78, American jockey.
- Thomas Tyra, 62, American composer, arranger, and bandmaster.
- Al Unser, 82, American baseball player (Detroit Tigers, Cincinnati Reds).

=== 8 ===
- Günter Bialas, 87, German composer.
- Paul Bonneau, 76, French conductor, composer and arranger.
- Edmondo Fabbri, 73, Italian football player and coach.
- Jean-Paul Harroy, 86, Belgian colonial civil servant and governor Ruanda-Urundi.
- George Johnson, 74, Canadian medical doctor and political reformer.
- Pál Kovács, 82, Hungarian fencer and Olympian (1936, 1948, 1952, 1956, 1960).
- Dorothy Stanley-Turner, 78, English racing driver.
- Petrus Josephus Zoetmulder, 89, Dutch missionary and linguist.

=== 9 ===
- Dennis Allen, 56, English football player and manager.
- Kazimierz Godłowski, 60, Polish archeologist and historian.
- Federico Marietti, 69, Italian Olympic basketball player (1948, 1952).
- Vera Thomas, 73, English table tennis and tennis player.
- James Cameron Tudor, 75, Barbadian politician and diplomat.

=== 10 ===
- Mehmet Ali Aybar, 86, Turkish politician and Olympian (1928), heart failure.
- Reds Bagnell, 66, American football player.
- August Belmont IV, 86, American investment banker and thoroughbred racehorse owner.
- James Harvey Brown, 89, American politician and judge.
- Văn Cao, 71, Vietnamese composer.
- Hugh Dundas, 74, British RAF fighter pilot during World War II and television executive .
- Barbara Lyon, 63, American singer and actress, cerebral hemorrhage.
- Alfonso Zirpoli, 90, American district judge (United States District Court for the Northern District of California).

=== 11 ===
- John Cruickshank, 70, Irish scholar and writer on the French language, literature and culture.
- David J. Kennedy, 88, American politician.
- Gojko Nikoliš, 83, Yugoslavia/Serbian partisan general, physician, and historian.
- Helma Seitz, 82, German actress.
- Don Starr, 77, American actor, fall.
- Armand Walter, 87, French Olympic gymnast (1936).

=== 12 ===
- Lennart Ahlin, 78, Swedish sports shooter and Olympian (1964).
- Michael Clegg, 62, British museum curator, naturalist, and television presenter.
- Earl Coleman, 69, American jazz singer.
- Ashapoorna Devi, 86, Indian novelist and poet.
- Gordon Flemyng, 61, Scottish television and film director.
- Erich Kulka, 84, Czech-Israeli writer, historian and journalist.
- Sean Mayes, 50, British pianist and writer.
- John Yudkin, 84, British physiologist and nutritionist

=== 13 ===
- Ali Al-Wardi, 81, Iraqi social scientist.
- Aimé Barelli, 78, French jazz trumpeter, vocalist, and band leader.
- Varyl Begg, 86, British Royal Navy admiral, Alzheimer's disease.
- József Bencsics, 61, Hungarian football player.
- Garth Butler, 72, English footballer.
- Devyani Chaubal, 52–53, Indian journalist and columnist.
- Godtfred Kirk Christiansen, 75, Danish toy manufacturer and managing director of Lego.
- Bilge Karasu, 65, Turkish short story writer and novelist.
- Peter Morrison, 51, British politician.
- Matti Pellonpää, 44, Finnish actor and a musician, heart attack.

=== 14 ===
- Elsebeth Brehm, 93, Danish tennis player and Olympian (1920, 1924).
- Henri Gastaut, 80, French neurologist and epileptologist.
- Noel Orange, 55, Australian rules footballer.
- Herb Rowland, 84, Canadian Olympic wrestler (1932).
- Sergey Shupletsov, 25, Russian freestyle skier and Olympic medalist (1992, 1994), traffic collision.
- Volodymyr, 69, Ukrainian patriarch of the Eastern Orthodox Church.

=== 15 ===
- Bill Amick, 69, American NASCAR driver.
- Khalid Bakdash, 82–83, Syrian communist politician.
- Delia Bogard, 74, American actress and dancer.
- Sylvia Bossu, 33, French conceptual artist, car accident.
- Robert-Joseph Coffy, 74, French Roman Catholic cardinal and Archbishop of Marseille.
- Brian Molony, 62, Australian rules footballer.
- Cyril Solomon, 84, Australian cricketer.
- Ivano Staccioli, 68, Italian film actor.

=== 16 ===
- Charles Bruck, 84, French-American conductor and teacher.
- Torfi Bryngeirsson, 68, Icelandic Olympic pole vaulter (1948, 1952).
- Louis Darmanin, 86, Maltese Olympic water polo player (1928).
- Gustaf Ekström, 87, Swedish chemist, SS volunteer, and politician.
- Mordechai Gur, 65, Israeli military officer and politician, suicide.
- Patsy Ruth Miller, 91, American actress, heart attack.
- Zenonas Puzinauskas, 75, Lithuanian basketball player.
- May Sarton, 83, Belgian-American feminist writer, breast cancer.
- Sir Stephen Spender, 86, English poet and writer.
- Charles Woodbridge, 93, American missionary, minister, and founding member of the National Association of Evangelicals.
- Elvis Álvarez, 30, Colombian flyweight boxer, homicide.

=== 17 ===
- Lionel Billas, 66, French Olympic long-distance runner (1952).
- Gani Bobi, 51, Albanian philosopher and sociologist from Kosovo.
- Harvey Charters, 83, Canadian Olympic canoeist (1936).
- Robert Close, 92, Australian novelist.
- Ephraim Evron, 75, Israeli diplomat.
- Juan Manuel Fangio, 84, Argentine racing driver.
- Harry Guardino, 69, American actor (Dirty Harry, The Enforcer, Pork Chop Hill), lung cancer.
- Herb Hippauf, 56, American professional baseball player (Atlanta Braves), and scout, cancer.
- Rainer Kunad, 58, German conductor and composer.
- Michael Ljunggren, 33, Swedish outlaw biker and gangster, murdered.

=== 18 ===
- Bernard Bolender, 42, American mass murderer, execution by electrocution.
- Fabio Casartelli, 24, Italian cyclist and Olympian (1992), bicycle crash during the 1995 Tour de France.
- Johan Gabriel Oxenstierna, 95, Swedish Olympic modern pentathlete (1932), and naval officer.
- Ryōichi Sasakawa, 96, Japanese suspected war criminal, businessman, politician, and philanthropist.
- Subagio Sastrowardoyo, 71, Indonesian poet, short-story writer, essayist and literary critic.
- Princess Srinagarindra, The Princess Mother of Thailand, 94, Thai princess, kidney disease.
- Thomas Tang, 73, American lawyer and circuit judge (United States Court of Appeals for the Ninth Circuit).

=== 19 ===
- Michael Andrews, 66, British painter.
- Balakrishna, 78, Indian actor.
- Sydney Lipton, 89, British dance band leader.
- Brian Lloyd, 68, English rower and Olympian (1948, 1952).
- Víctor Manuel Mendoza, 81, Mexican film actor.
- Tomás Méndez, 68, Mexican composer and singer of Mexican music and ranchera music.
- Kim Pong-ryul, 77, North Korean general of the Korean People's Army.
- René Privat, 64, French road bicycle racer.

=== 20 ===
- Pierre Barbet, 70, French science fiction writer.
- Bernard Callinan, 82, Australian soldier, civil engineer, businessman, and sport administrator.
- Cesare Emiliani, 72, Italian-American scientist, geologist, micropaleontologist, and founder of paleoceanography.
- Helmut Gernsheim, 82, German photographer, collector and historian.
- Arthur Herrdin, 76, Swedish Olympic cross-country skier (1948, 1952).
- Ernest Mandel, 72, Belgian Marxian economist and a Trotskyist activist and theorist, heart attack.
- Natalia Shpiller, 85, Czech-Russian operatic soprano and a People's Artist of Russia.
- Raimundo Tupper, 26, Chilean football player, suicide.

=== 21 ===
- Viktor Barannikov, 54, Soviet Interior Minister in 1991 and Russia Minister from 1992 to 1993.
- Yves Cros, 71, French athlete and Olympian (1948).
- Heinrich Dumoulin, 90, German Jesuit theologian, philosopher and author.
- Aad de Graaf, 55, Dutch cyclist and Olympian (1960, 1964).
- Jon Hinson, 53, American politician, member of the United States House of Representatives (1979-1981).
- Sajjad Hussain, 78, Indian film score composer.
- Claude McLin, 69, American jazz tenor saxophonist.
- Pavle Šovljanski, 67, Yugoslavian Olympic boxer (1952).
- Elleston Trevor, 75, British novelist and playwright.
- Michael Wisher, 60, English actor (Doctor Who).
- Tarzan Woltzen, 90, American basketball player.

=== 22 ===
- Tami Ben-Ami, 39–40, Israeli supermodel, cervical cancer.
- Jack Bergin, 74, New Zealand neurologist.
- Dudley Baldwin Bonsal, 88, American district judge (United States District Court for the Southern District of New York).
- Otakar Borůvka, 96, Czech mathematician known for his contribution to graph theory.
- Dave Clark, 86, pioneering African-American record promoter.
- Daniel Dixon, 2nd Baron Glentoran, 83, Northern Ireland soldier and politician.
- Percy Humphrey, 90, American jazz trumpeter and band leader.
- Roly Jenkins, 76, English cricketeer.
- Cecil Kerr, 85, Australian rules footballer.
- Harold Larwood, 90, British cricket player.
- Elyse Pahler, 15, American high school freshman.
- Shiva Kumar Rai, 76, Indian writer and politician.
- Joshua Smith, 90, Australian artist.

=== 23 ===
- Ray Beverton, 72, British biologist who made important contributions to fisheries science.
- Vernon Cheadle, 85, American botanist, educator and university administrator.
- Chuck Hanger, 71, American basketball player.
- Ewa Malewicka, 40, Polish Olympic speed skater (1976).
- Mario Passano, 70, Argentine film actor and tango performer, heart attack.
- Berta Scharrer, 88, American scientist.
- Trần Kim Tuyến, 70, Vietnamese diplomat and Chief of intelligence of South Vietnam.
- Kees Verwey, 95, Dutch painter.

=== 24 ===
- Sadik Achmet, 48, Greek medical doctor and politician, traffic collision.
- Turan Amirsoleimani, 90, Iranian royal.
- Martha Boaz, 83, American librarian.
- Endre Bán, 61, Hungarian Catholic priest, theologian, and professor.
- Judith Dvorkin, 67, American composer and librettist.
- Hassan Katsina, 62, Nigerian general and last Governor of Northern Nigeria.
- Jerry Lordan, 61, English songwriter, composer and singer, acute renal failure.
- Jerzy Toeplitz, 85, Russian film maker.
- Theo Wied, 72, German Olympic gymanst (1952, 1956).
- Hans Wind, 75, Finnish fighter pilot and flying ace during World War II.

=== 25 ===
- Janice Elliott, 63, English fiction writer, journalist and children's writer.
- Eddie Isbey, 77, New Zealand politician.
- Toy Ledbetter, 67, American football player (Philadelphia Eagles).
- Ernestina Maenza, 86, Spanish Olympic alpine skier (1936).
- Rosalia Maggio, 74, Italian actress, dancer, singer and showgirl, cancer.
- Osvaldo Pugliese, 89, Argentine tango musician.
- Charlie Rich, 62, American singer, pulmonary embolism.
- Hermine Tobolowsky, 74, American Equal Rights Amendment activist.

=== 26 ===
- Doris Akers, 72, American gospel music composer, arranger and singer, spinal cord neoplasm.
- Laurindo Almeida, 77, Brazilian guitarist and composer in classical, jazz, and Latin music, cancer.
- Jaime de Mora y Aragón, 70, Spanish aristocrat and actor.
- Gawain Westray Bell, 86, British colonial administrator and Governor of Northern Nigeria.
- Sam Benson, 86, Australian politician.
- Eleanore Griffin, 91, American screenwriter (Boys Town), Oscar winner (1939).
- Heinrich Heesch, 89, German mathematician.
- Baruch Korff, 81, Ukrainian-American Orthodox rabbi and American-Jewish community activist.
- Pietro Leoni, 86, Mexican Dominican priest.
- Boy Lornsen, 72, German sculptor and children's author.
- Raymond Mailloux, 77, Canadian politician and Cabinet Minister.
- George Rodger, 87, British photojournalist.
- George W. Romney, 88, American politician and 43rd Governor of Michigan and father of Mitt Romney, heart attack.
- Ismayil Shykhly, 76, Azerbaijani writer.

=== 27 ===
- Iza Bieżuńska-Małowist, 78, Polish historian and professor at the University of Warsaw.
- Don Carpenter, 64, American novelist and playwright, suicide .
- Vladimír Dzurilla, 52, Slovak ice hockey goaltender and Olympian (1964, 1968, 1972).
- Melih Esenbel, 80, Turkish diplomat and Minister of Foreign Affairs.
- Rick Ferrell, 89, American Hall of Fame baseball player (St. Louis Browns, Boston Red Sox, Washington Senators), coach, and scout.
- Eric Fright, 77, English footballer and Olympian (1948).
- Fanahan McSweeney, 47, Irish sprinter and Olympian (1972).
- Miklós Rózsa, 88, Hungarian film composer (Ben-Hur, Spellbound, The Thief of Baghdad), Oscar winner (1946, 1948, 1960).

=== 28 ===
- Susie Cooper, 92, British artist.
- Douglas Dalton, 82, New Zealand rugby player.
- Eddie Hinton, 51, American songwriter and session musician.
- Casper Oimoen, 89, American ski jumper and Olympian (1932, 1936).

=== 29 ===
- Juozas Bulavas, 86, Lithuanian legal scholar, academic, and politician.
- Bruno Da Col, 82, Italian Olympic ski jumper (1936, 1948).
- Philippe De Lacy, 78, French-American silent film era child actor, cancer.
- Les Elgart, 77, American swing jazz bandleader and trumpeter.
- Canray Fontenot, 72, American Creole fiddle player.
- Kurt Gudewill, 84, German musicologist.
- Leo Kofler, 88, Austrian-German Marxist sociologist.
- Miklós Meszéna, 54, Hungarian Olympic fencer (1964, 1968).
- Kevin Tame, 63, Australian footballer.
- Severino Varela, 81, Uruguayan football player.

=== 30 ===
- Nalin Angammana, 49–50, Sri Lanka Army officer, homicide.
- Aleksander Bardini, 81, Polish theatre and opera director, actor, and educator.
- Pelle Christensen, 72, Norwegian actor and translator.
- Nando Cicero, 64, Italian film director, screenwriter and actor.
- Charles Dunn, 80, British japanologist from the SOAS University of London.
- Alfredo Giannetti, 71, Italian screenwriter and film director.
- Anthony Jennings, 50, New Zealand harpsichordist, organist, director, and academic.
- Nikolai Kuznetsov, 84, Russian aeronautical engineer.
- Harry Leonard Shorto, 75, British linguist scholar of Mon and Khmer languages.
- Verner E. Suomi, 79, Finnish-American educator, inventor, and scientist.

=== 31 ===
- Joan Embury Cochran, 82, New Zealand social reformer and sex educator.
- Bernhard Jope, 81, German Luftwaffe bomber pilot during World War II.
- Risto Lamppu, 70, Finnish Olympic field hockey player (1952).
- Harry Madison, 85, Canadian Olympic wrestler (1932).
- Thomas E. Morgan, 88, American politician, member of the United States House of Representatives (1945-1977).
- Genevieve Tobin, 95, American actress.
- Lola Todd, 91, American silent film era actress.

== Sources ==
- Liebman, Roy (2000). The Wampas Baby Stars: A Biographical Dictionary, 1922–1934. Jefferson, North Carolina: McFarland. ISBN 0-7864-0756-5.
