= Cootamundra Annual Classic =

Race details
- Date: August
- Region: New South Wales, Australia
- Nickname(s): Coota Annual, Coota Classic
- Discipline: Road
- Competition: State Open
- Type: Road Handicap
- Organiser: Cootamundra Cycling Club

History
- First edition: 1955
- Editions: 55
- First winner: Jim Bundy (AUS)
- Most wins: Garry Crowe (AUS) 3 wins
- Most recent: Aaron Donnelly (AUS) (2012)

The Cootamundra Annual Classic, also known as the Coota Classic or Coota Annual, is a bicycle handicap race starting and finishing in the New South Wales town of Cootamundra. First run in 1955, the race is traditionally held on the last weekend in August. Today it is one of the oldest open road races in New South Wales.

== History ==
The race has run every year since 1955, making it one of oldest races on the Cycling NSW open calendar. Organised by Cootamundra Cycling Club, past winners have included road professional Graeme Brown and 2010 Melbourne to Warrnambool winner Rhys Pollock. Traditionally the race was held in the last Saturday of August each year, it has now moved to fit with the NSW Cycling calendar.

Cootamundra local man Garry Crowe holds the title of the most Coota Annual wins after taking the honours in 1968, 1975 and again in 1991 at the age of 50 years old.

== Course ==
Up until 2011 the course started in Cootamundra, traveled North through the small town Wallendbeen to Young along the Olympic Highway. The race then turned south, travelling to Harden, then West back to Wallendbeen before returning to the finish in Cootamundra. The course was 120 kilometres long.

From 2011 the course was shortened to 106 km with the course resembling a figure '8' centered on Cootamundra

== Past winners ==
Year	Distance	Winner	From	Fastest Time	From
2012	106 km	Aaron Donnelly	Illawarra CC	Aaron Donnelly 2:27'06"	Illawarra CC
2011	106 km	Shaun Lewis	Southern Highlands CC	Stephen Fairless 2:27'21"	Shepparton Cycling Club
2010	120 km	Rhys Pollock	Albury Wodonga CC	Rhys Pollock 2:49'21"	Albury Wodonga CC
2009	120 km	Stuart Shaw	Canberra CC	Stuart Shaw 2:54'47"	Canberra CC
2008	120 km	Matthew Carmellotti	Norwa Velo Club	Blair Windsor 2:48'35"	
2007	120 km	Joe McDonnell	Sutherland Shire CC	Joe McDonnell 2:44'35"	Sutherland Shire CC
2006	120 km	Charles Gascoyne/Kevin Nicholls	Orange CTC/?	Rob McLachlan 2:41'45"	Canberra CC
2005	120 km	David Whyman	Randwick Botany CC	Stuart Shaw 2:41'00"*	Canberra CC
2004	120 km	Rob McLachlan	Canberra CC	Rob McLachlan 2:42'30"	Canberra CC
2003	120 km	Hector Morales		Hector Morales 2:55'59"	
2002	120 km	Craig Metcalf	Albury Wodonga CC	Josh Collingwood 2:46'46"	
2001	120 km	John Leary	Cootamundra Cycle Club	Brian Appleyard 2:46'49"	
2000	120 km	Darren Rolf		Darren Rolf 2:48'07"	
1999	120 km	Marcus Hayman		Trent Wilson 2:48'19"	
1998	120 km	Graham Brown		Graham Brown 2:46'07"	
