= Bob Holder =

Bob Holder (born 1931) is an Australian rodeo cowboy from Cootamundra, New South Wales. In 2019, he was reckoned as the world's oldest professional in the sport.

== History ==
At the age of five, Holder accompanied his father droving, and after some formal education became a successful real-estate agent with Elders Real Estate, Cootamundra, and lives in the district.

Holder first entered a competition as a novice at the Tumut rodeo aged 14, winning the bronc ride. In 1953, he won the Novice class at the Wagga showgrounds in October 1953. In March 1954, he came fourth in both the NSW bareback riding and bullock riding championships at Condobolin. Holder won the Riverina bareback riding championship at Narrandera a month later.

In 1959, he was invited to appear on the American rodeo circuit, on a tour that culminated at Madison Square Garden; one of the first Australian cowboys to be so honoured.

In later years, his specialty was team roping as the "header", whose job is to lasso the horns of a steer while his partner (Brian Lawless, another Cootamundra resident) as "heeler" tackles the hind legs.

== Recognition ==
On 23 October 2017, Holder was inducted into the Australian Professional Rodeo Association's Hall of Fame.

Holder's daughter Kerrie is a rodeo cowgirl, specializing in barrel racing.
