= Cyril Solomon =

Australian cricketer

Personal information
- Full name: Cyril Moss Solomon
- Born: 11 March 1911; Cootamundra, New South Wales, Australia
- Died: 15 July 1995 (aged 84); Cootamundra, New South Wales, Australia

Domestic team information
- Years: Team
- 1931/32–1939/40: New South Wales
- Source: ESPNcricinfo, 2 February 2017

Cyril Moss Solomon (11 March 1911 – 15 July 1995) was an Australian cricketer. He played 13 first-class matches for New South Wales between the 1931–32 season and 1939–40.

Born at Cootamundra in New South Wales in 1911, Solomon played club cricket for the Petersham and Waverley clubs, and later played Victorian Premier Cricket for Hawthorn-East Melbourne. He made his first-class debut for the New South Wales state side against the touring touring South Africans at the Sydney Cricket Ground in December 1931, scoring 11 runs in his only innings. He went on to score 787 runs, including a single century, in 13 first-class matches. His century came against South Australia in December 1939, with Solomon scoring 131 runs.

Solomon died at Cootamundra in 1995. He was aged 84.
