= Cricket Captains' Walk =

Memorial path to Australian test cricket captains

The Cricket Captains' Walk is a collection of specially commissioned bronze busts of Test captains of the Australian men’s national cricket team, arrayed on pedestals on the outside of a rectangular path set in a large public park in Cootamundra, New South Wales. The all-weather path, which starts and ends at Wallendoon Street is wheelchair friendly, and approximately 150 metres around.

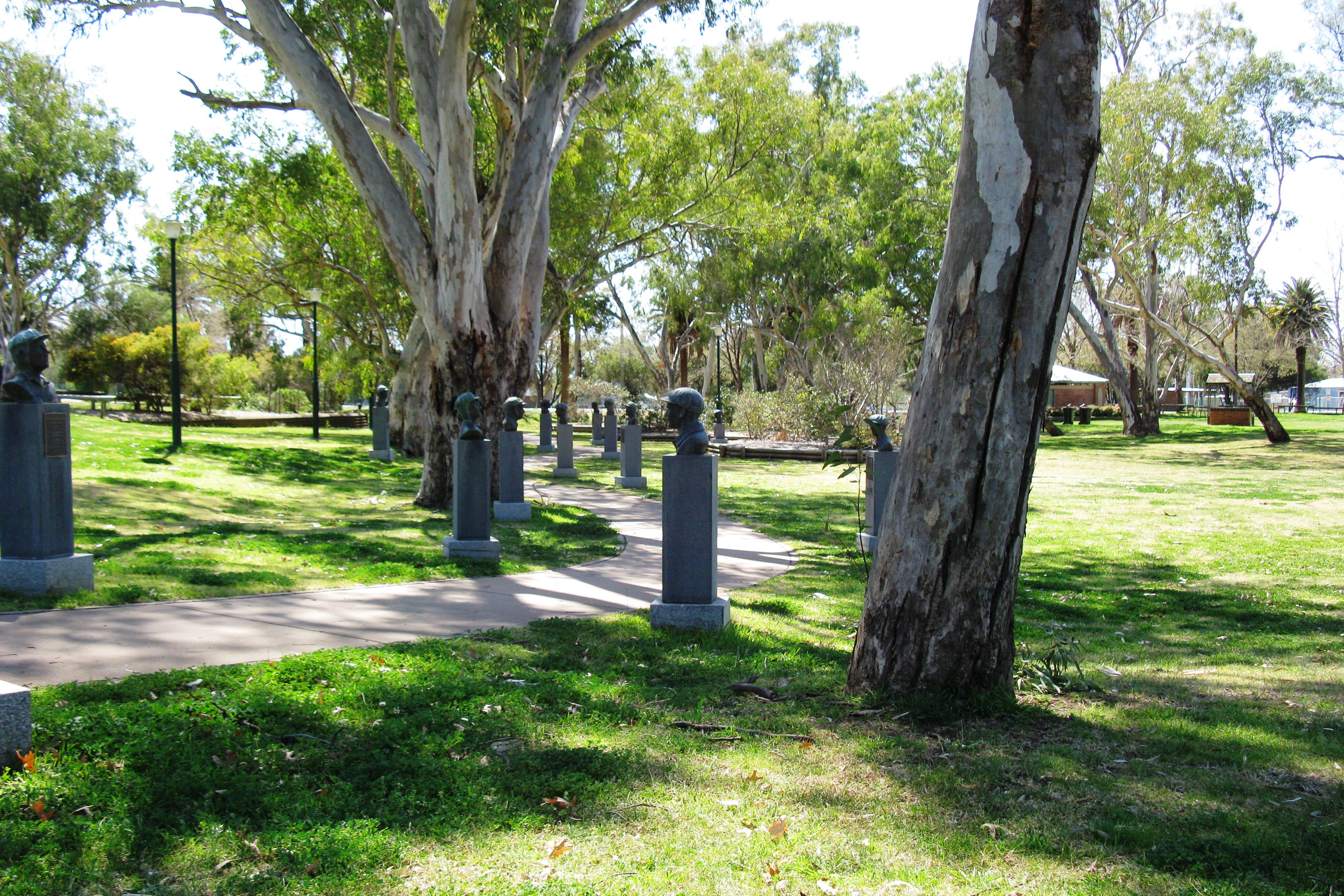
Cricket Captains' Walk, as it was

Cricket Captains' Walk, Cootamundra. For clarity, only a few names are listed here.
1 Unaarrimin
2 Tom Horan
3 Hugh Massie
4 Hugh Trumble
5 Jack Ryder
6 Vic Richardson
7 Ray Lindwall
8 Ian Craig
9 Ian Chappell
10 Adam Gilchrist
11 Ricky Ponting
12 Steve Smith
16 Bradman figure

== History ==
The Walk was planned and executed by the Cootamundra Shire Council (now Cootamundra–Gundagai Regional Council) with the approval of the Australian Cricket Board (now Cricket Australia).

- Stage 1, unveiled on 30 August 1998, comprised the likenesses of Unaarrimin (Johnny Mullagh), Dave Gregory, Bill Murdoch, Arthur Morris, Richie Benaud, Bobby Simpson, Bill Lawry, Ian Chappell, Greg Chappell, Allan Border and Mark Taylor. Modelling of these busts was performed by Carl Valerius, sculptor and stone mason of Harden–Murrumburrah, perhaps best known for his bronze statues at the Australian Light Horse Memorial in Harden–Murrumburrah, notably the horse "Bill the Bastard", of which the full size version is now installed at Harden-Murrumburrah.

The nearby statue by Valerius (shown below) of Bradman in action was unveiled during the celebrations for "Sir Don"'s 92nd Birthday in August 2000. A minor mystery surrounds the Brian Booth sculpture, similar in style to others by Valerius, but not credited in the official documentation. There is no obvious clue in the plaques, which have remained uniform in style and execution over 30 years.

- Stage 2, comprising the remaining 30 captains, was unveiled by the sculptor Tom Bass on 27 August 2008, the centenary of Bradman's birth barely a kilometre away. Much of this work was performed by Bass and his team. His bust of Bradman was unveiled by the cricketer's grandson, Tom Bradman.
- Stage 3, unveiled on 12 March 2020, brought the walk up-to-date with the unveiling of three new busts - Shane Watson, Steve Smith and Tim Paine and a plaque for Michael Clarke, who was mid-career when the second tranche of busts was commissioned. All three were made by the Tom Bass sculpture studio.

In 2023 the pedestals were relocated to a more formal arrangement with the Bradman statue as a focal point.

== The busts ==
- For a more complete summary of each captaincy, see List of Australia national cricket captains.

| Work | Name | Specialty | Tests as Captain | Plaque | Artist | Notes |
|---|---|---|---|---|---|---|
| | Johnny Mullagh, traditional name Unaarrimin or Unaarrimmim | | Led Australian Aboriginal cricket team in England in 1868 | | Carl Valerius | Sponsored by Aboriginal and Torres Strait Islander Commission |
| | Dave Gregory | | 3 Tests; 1876–77; 1878–79 | | Carl Valerius | Sponsored by Goldenfields Water County Council |
| | Billy Murdoch | RH batsman | 16 Tests; 1880–1890 | | Carl Valerius | Murdoch was a practising solicitor in Cootamundra in 1880s. Sponsored by Australia Post |
| | Tom Horan | RH batsman Bowler | 2 Tests; 1884–85 | | Robert Pratten | |
| | Hugh Massie | RH batsman | 1 Test; 1884–85 | | Bernice Lowe | |
| | Jack Blackham | Wicketkeeper; RH batsman | 8 Tests; 1884–85; 1891–92; 1893; 1894–95 | | Karen Alexander | |
| | Tup Scott | RH batsman Bowler | 3 Tests; 1886 | | Damien Lucas | |
| | Percy McDonnell | RH batsman | 6 Tests; 1886–87 | | Wendy Black | |
| | George Giffen | RH batsman Bowler | 4 Tests; 1894–95 | | Michael Christie & Sue Alexopoulos | |
| | Harry Trott | RH batsman Bowler | 8 Tests; 1896; 1897–98 | | Damien Lucas | |
| | Joe Darling | LH batsman | 21 Tests; 1901–02; 1902; 1902–03; 1905 | | Lea Ferris | |
| | Hugh Trumble | RH batsman Bowler | 2 Tests; 1901–02 | | Sue Alexopoulos | |
| | Monty Noble | RH batsman Bowler | 15 Tests; 1903–04; 1907–08; 1909 | | Carol Crawford | |
| | Clem Hill | LH batsman | 10 Tests; 1910–11 | | Bernice Lowe | |
| | Syd Gregory | RH batsman | 6 Tests; 1912 | | Michael Christie | |
| | Warwick Armstrong | RH batsman Bowler | 10 Tests; 1920–21 | | Christine Crimmins | |
| | Herbie Collins | RH batsman | 11 Tests; 1921–22; 1924–25; 1926 | | BJ (Beomjin) Kim | |
| | Warren Bardsley | LH batsman | 2 Tests; 1926 | | Peter Bartlett | |
| | Jack Ryder | RH batsman Bowler | 5 Tests; 1928–29 | | Julieanne Mahony | |
| | Bill Woodfull | RH batsman | 25 Tests; 1930; 1930–31; 1931–32; 1932–33; 1934 | | Virginia Lloyd–Tait | |
| | Vic Richardson | RH batsman Slips fieldsman | 5 Tests; 1935–36 | | Robert Pratten | |
| | Don Bradman | RH batsman | 24 Tests; 1936–37; 1938; 1946–47; 1947–48; 1948 | | Tom Bass | |
| | Bill Brown | RH opening batsman | 1 Test; 1945–46 | | Karen Alexander | |
| | Lindsay Hassett | RH batsman Bowler | 24 Tests; 1951–52; 1952–53; 1953 | | Petrena Shaw | |
| | Arthur Morris | LH batsman | 2 Tests; 1951–52; 1954–55 | | Carl Valerius | |
| | Ian Johnson | RH batsman Bowler | 17 Tests; 1954–55; 1956; 1956–57 | | Janet Coyne | |
| | Ray Lindwall | RH Bowler; Lower-order batsman | 1 Test; 1956–57 | | Michael Christie | |
| | Ian Craig | RH batsman | 5 Tests; 1957–58 | | Peter Bartlett | |
| | Richie Benaud | RH batsman Leg spin bowler | 28 Tests; 1958–1964 | | Carl Valerius | |
| | Neil Harvey | LH batsman Cover fieldsman | 1 Test; 1961 | | Bernice Lowe | |
| | Bob Simpson | RH opening batsman Leg spin bowler Slips fieldsman | 39 Tests; 1963–1978 | | Carl Valerius | |
| | Brian Booth | RH batsman | 2 Tests; 1965–1966 | | | |
| | Bill Lawry | LH opening batsman | 25 Tests; 1967–1971 | | Carl Valerius | Sponsored by the City of Darebin, Victoria, who have a replica in their council chambers. |
| | Barry Jarman | RH batsman Wicketkeeper | 1 Test; 1968 | | Carol Crawford | |
| | Ian Chappell | RH top-order batsman Slips fieldsman | 30 Tests; 1970–1975 | | Carl Valerius | |
| | Greg Chappell | RH batsman Bowler; Fieldsman | 48 Tests; 1975–1983 | | Carl Valerius | |
| | Graham Yallop | LH top-order batsman | 7 Tests; 1978–1979 | | Damien Lucas | |
| | Kim Hughes | RH batsman | 28 Tests; 1978–1984 | | Wendy Black | |
| | Allan Border | LH batsman Bowler; Fieldsman | 93 Tests; 1984–1994 | | Carl Valerius | |
| | Mark Taylor | LH batsman Slips fieldsman | 50 Tests; 1994–1999 | | Carl Valerius | Sponsored by Pat Kerin, Cootamundra cricketing aficionado |
| | Steve Waugh | RH batsman Bowler | 57 Tests; 1999–2004 | | Carl Valerius | |
| | Adam Gilchrist | LH batsman Wicketkeeper | 6 Tests; 2000–2004 | | Sue Alexopoulos | |
| | Ricky Ponting | RH batsman | 77 Tests; 2003–2010 | | Wendy Black | |
| | Michael Clarke | RH batsman Slips fieldsman | 47 Tests; 2011–2015 | | Christine Crimmins | |
| | Shane Watson | RH batsman Fast bowler | 1 Test; 2013 | | Wendy Black | |
| | Steve Smith | RH batsman Slips fieldsman | 34 Tests; 2014–2018 | | Monika Scarrabelotti | |
| | Tim Paine | RH batsman Wicketkeeper | 19 Tests; 2018–2021 | | Christine Crimmins | |
| | Pat Cummins | Right Arm fast bowler | 2021– | | | |

== Gallery ==
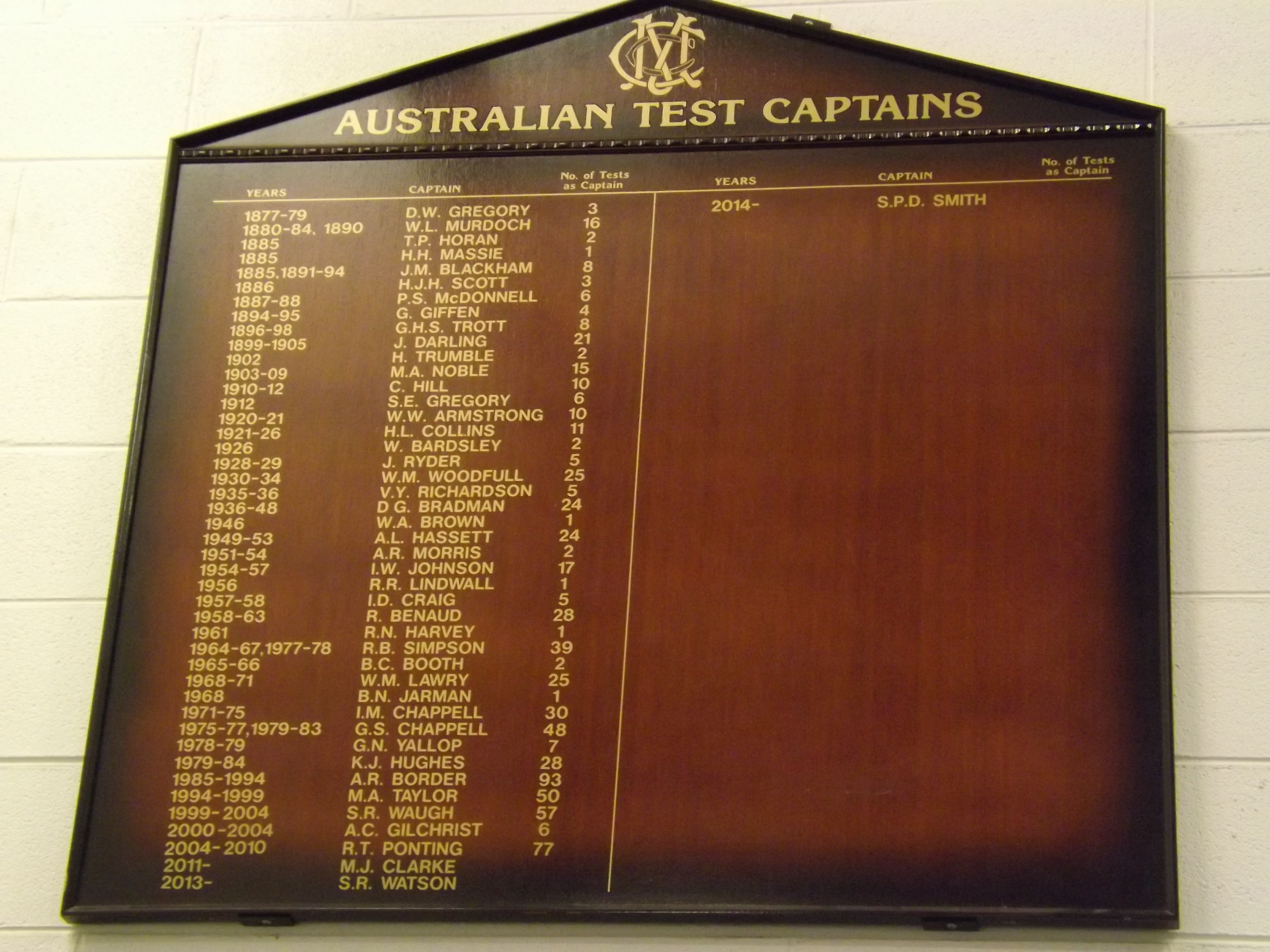
List of Test Captains at the MCG

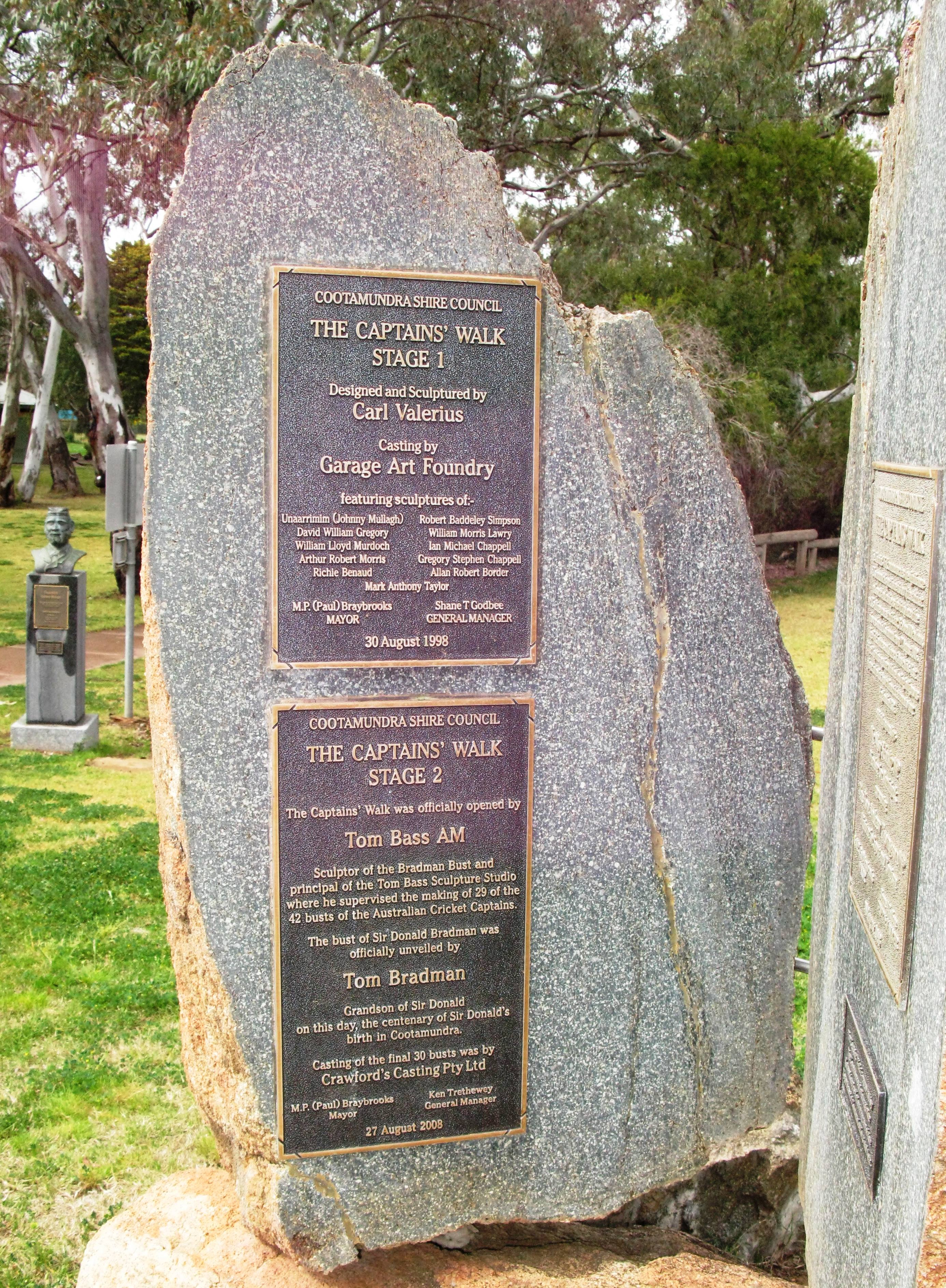
History of Cricket Captains' Walk

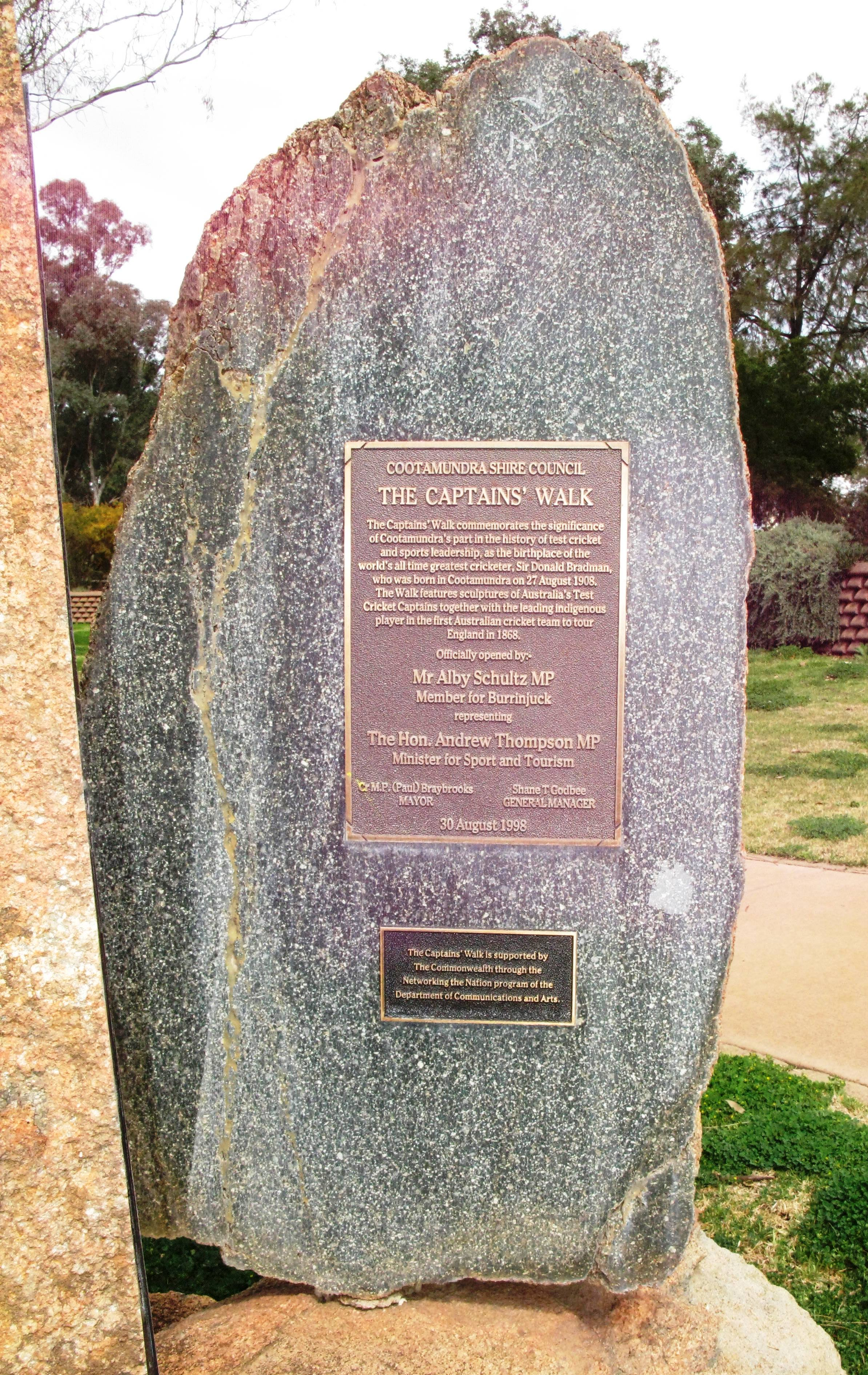
Info on Cricket Captains' Walk

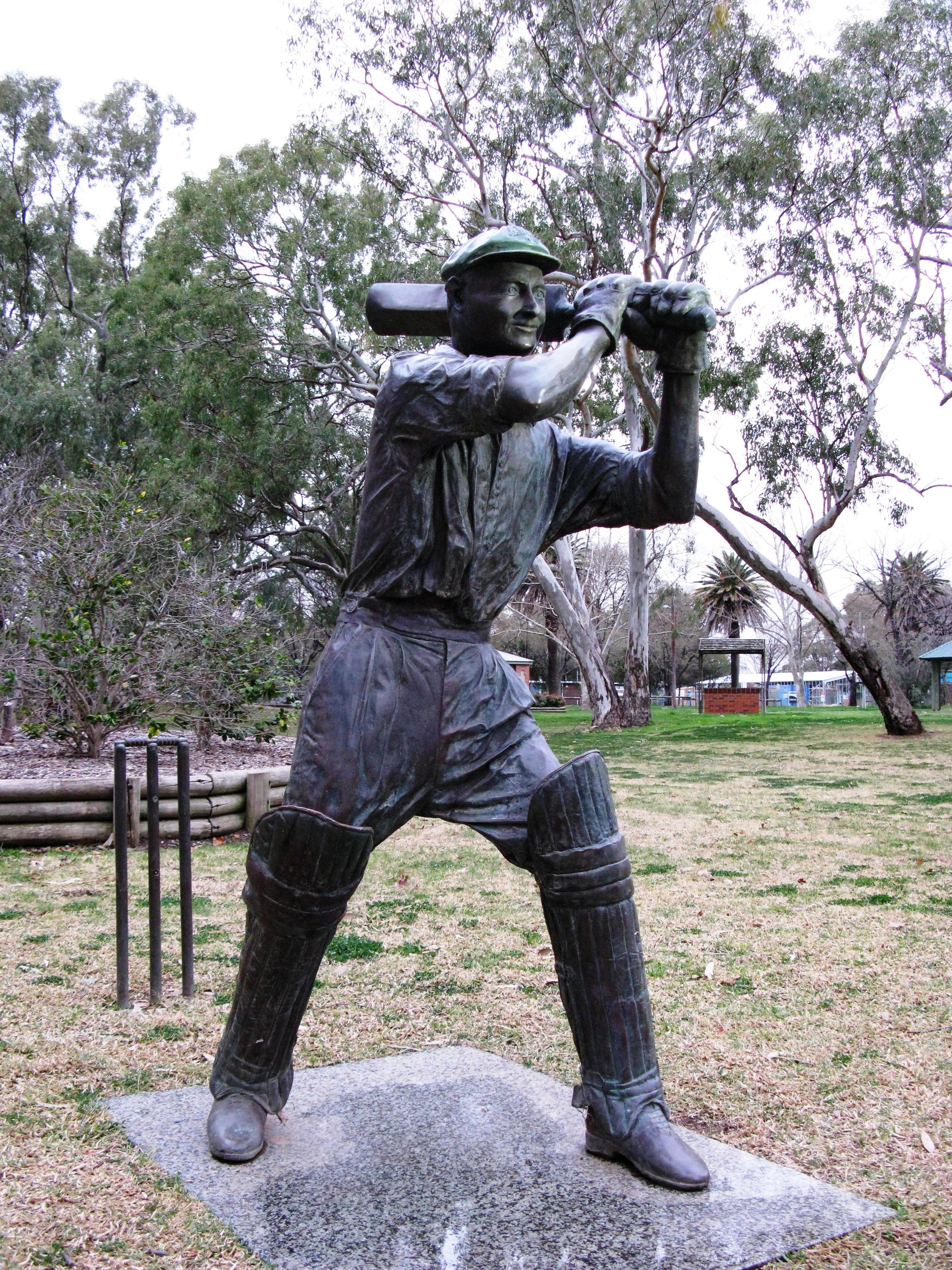
Don Bradman statue nearby

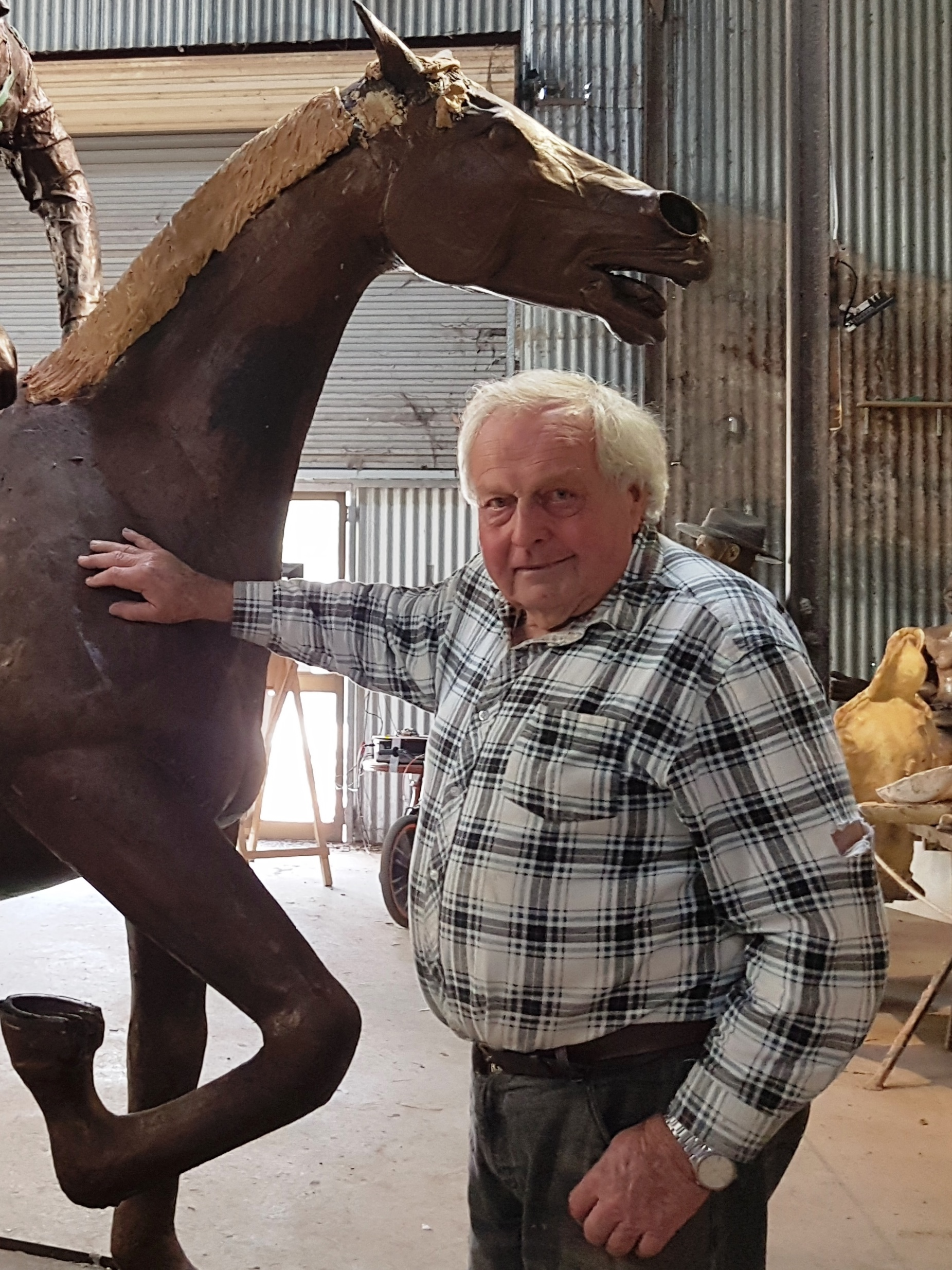
Carl Valerius and Bill the Bastard

== See also ==
- List of Australia national cricket captains
