= Kevin Tame =

Australian rules footballer

Personal information
- Full name: Kevin Tame
- Born: 26 October 1931
- Died: 29 July 1995 (aged 63)
- Original team: Preston District
- Height: 178 cm (5 ft 10 in)
- Weight: 76 kg (168 lb)

Playing career^{1}
| Years | Club | Games (Goals) |
| 1952 | Fitzroy | 3 (0) |
- ^{1} Playing statistics correct to the end of 1952.

Kevin Tame (26 October 1931 – 29 July 1995) was a former Australian rules footballer who played with Fitzroy in the Victorian Football League (VFL).
