= Wrestling at the 1932 Summer Olympics – Men's freestyle light heavyweight =

Men's freestyle light heavyweight at the Games of the X Olympiad
- Venue: Grand Olympic Auditorium
- Dates: 1–3 August 1932
- Competitors: 4 from 4 nations

Medalists
1st place, gold medalist(s)		Peter Mehringer	United States
2nd place, silver medalist(s)		Thure Sjöstedt	Sweden
3rd place, bronze medalist(s)		Eddie Scarf	Australia

The men's freestyle light heavyweight competition at the 1932 Summer Olympics in Los Angeles took place from 1 August to 3 August at the Grand Olympic Auditorium. Nations were limited to one competitor. This weight class was limited to wrestlers weighing up to 87kg.

This freestyle wrestling competition did not use the single-elimination bracket format previously used for Olympic freestyle wrestling but instead followed the format that was introduced at the 1928 Summer Olympics for Greco-Roman wrestling, using an elimination system based on the accumulation of points. Each round featured all wrestlers pairing off and wrestling one bout (with one wrestler having a bye if there were an odd number). The loser received 3 points. The winner received 1 point if the win was by decision and 0 points if the win was by fall. At the end of each round, any wrestler with at least 5 points was eliminated.

== Schedule ==
Date	Event
1 August 1932	Round 1
2 August 1932	Round 2
3 August 1932	Final round

== Results ==
=== Round 1 ===
Both bouts were won by fall, with Mehringer and Scarf the victors (0 points) and Sjöstedt and Madison the losers (3 points).

Bouts

Winner	Nation	Victory Type	Loser	Nation
Peter Mehringer	United States	Fall	Thure Sjöstedt	Sweden
Eddie Scarf	Australia	Fall	Harry Madison	Canada

Points

Rank	Wrestler	Nation	Start	Earned	Total
1	Peter Mehringer	United States	0	0	0
1	Eddie Scarf	Australia	0	0	0
3	Harry Madison	Canada	0	3	3
3	Thure Sjöstedt	Sweden	0	3	3

=== Round 2 ===
The first-round winners drew the opposite first-round loser for the second round, with mixed results. Mehringer prevailed a second time (this time by decision, earning 1 point), giving Madison his second loss and elimination. Scarf, however, fell to Sjöstedt by fall, with both wrestlers ending the round at 3 points.

Winner	Nation	Victory Type	Loser	Nation
Thure Sjöstedt	Sweden	Fall	Eddie Scarf	Australia
Peter Mehringer	United States	Decision	Harry Madison	Canada

Points

Rank	Wrestler	Nation	Start	Earned	Total
1	Peter Mehringer	United States	0	1	1
2	Eddie Scarf	Australia	0	3	3
2	Thure Sjöstedt	Sweden	3	0	3
4	Harry Madison	Canada	3	3	6

=== Final round ===
Sjöstedt had already faced each of Mehringer and Scarf, so the only possible bout left among the three wrestlers was between Mehringer and Scarf. Scarf could not have taken gold, but only silver with a win (a win by fall would have left him tied at 3 points with Sjöstedt, whom he had already lost to; a win by decision would leave him tied with Mehringer at second but also broken that tie in favor of Scarf) or bronze with a loss. Sjöstedt was guaranteed at least silver with the bye, hoping for a Scarf win to give Sjöstedt gold. Mehringer could have finished the round with either gold (any win) or bronze (a loss). Mehringer won by decision, earning gold and sending Scarf to the bronze medal position, while Sjöstedt took silver.

Winner	Nation	Victory Type	Loser	Nation
Peter Mehringer	United States	Decision	Eddie Scarf	Australia
Thure Sjöstedt	Sweden	Bye	N/A	N/A

Points

Rank	Wrestler	Nation	Start	Earned	Total
1st place, gold medalist(s)	Peter Mehringer	United States	1	1	2
2nd place, silver medalist(s)	Thure Sjöstedt	Sweden	3	0	3
3rd place, bronze medalist(s)	Eddie Scarf	Australia	3	3	6
