= Devyani Chaubal =

Indian journalist (1942–1995)

Devyani Chaubal (1942 – 13 July 1995) was an Indian journalist and columnist. She is best known for her fortnightly column, "Frankly Speaking" in popular Bollywood film magazine Star and Style through the 1960s and 1970s, she also wrote for Eve's Weekly.

She was the first journalist to refer to Rajesh Khanna as a superstar, in her Star & Style column.

== Biography ==
She was born into a rich Marathi speaking family in Maharashtra; her father was a prosperous barrister in Mumbai. Chaubal was a film gossip journalist, and among the first in Indian film journalism to have a poison pen and insinuate a lot in her columns. Until her arrival, Indian film journalism had been largely free of accusation and gossip. She wrote in a popular film magazine called Star and Style.

She had a lot of credibility and her "gossip" (delivered in a column called "Frankly Speaking") was always researched and had credible sources. The column was also carried in Eve's Weekly.

Chaubal was the first writer to use Hinglish in her English works, with words like "badans" (bodies) and "kachra" (garbage). Shobha De then began to use Hinglish elements in her novels.

Later in life she suffered a paralytic stroke in 1985, thereafter she was largely using a wheelchair and later bedridden. However she continued to write her column, almost till her death in 1995, at age 53.
