= John Cruickshank (literary scholar) =

Irish writer (1925–1995)

John Cruickshank (18 July 1924, Belfast – 11 July 1995) was an Irish scholar and writer on the French language and French and francophone literature and culture. He was the first professor of French at the University of Sussex; founding the French studies department at that institution in 1962. He was a specialist on French writers Albert Camus, Benjamin Constant, Henry de Montherlant, Alfred de Vigny, Blaise Pascal, and Romain Rolland. During World War II he worked as a cryptologist for British military intelligence.

== Life and career ==
Born in Belfast, Ireland, Cruickshank was the son of a journalist who reporter on Parliament. attended grammar school at the Royal Belfast Academical Institution in his youth. He then studied foreign languages at Trinity College Dublin, but his education was interrupted by the events of World War II. From 1943 through 1945 he worked for British military intelligence as a cryptographer. He returned to Trinity College after the war to complete his education; graduating in 1948 with a First in both the French and German languages. He took a position at the École Normale Supérieure in Paris as a lecturer on the English language; teaching for the 1948–1949 academic year. There he pursued graduate studies, earning a Ph.D. with a dissertation on the French dramatist, writer and art historian Romain Rolland.

In 1951 Cruickshank returned to the United Kingdom to take a post as assistant lecturer at the University of Southampton. He remained there for the next eleven years, and in 1961 was made a senior lecturer. In 1962 he left Southampton to establish the French studies program at the University of Sussex as that institution's first professor of French. He remained there until his retirement in 1989.

== Partial list of books ==
- Albert Camus and the Literature of Revolt (1960, author)
- The Novelist as Philosopher (1962, contributing author among multiple writers)
- Aspects of the Modern European Mind (1969)
- French Literature and Its Background (1968-1970, six volumes as editor and contributing author)
