= Margaret F. Ackroyd =

American civil servant from Rhode Island

Margaret "Peggy" F. Ackroyd
- Born: Margaret O'Connor; January 15, 1908
- Died: July 4, 1995 (aged 87)
- Education: University of Rhode Island
- Occupations: Chief of the Rhode Island Division of Women and Children

Margaret F. Ackroyd (née O'Connor; January 15, 1908 – July 4, 1995) was a civil servant from Providence, Rhode Island. Ackroyd was named the Providence Journal's Man of the Year in 1971, and she was inducted into the Rhode Island Heritage Hall of Fame in 1972.

Ackroyd was born in Providence, Rhode Island, and attended Hope High School. Ackroyd earned a bachelor's degree in economics from the University of Rhode Island in 1929. She worked as a statistician in the Rhode Island state government in the 1930s before being fired for her gender in 1938. She then became the Executive Secretary of the Rhode Island Consumer's League. She was appointed Chief of the Division of Women and Children and Commissioner of Minimum Wage for the state of Rhode Island in 1940. She held both positions until her retirement in 1970.

During her career in the Rhode Island state government, Ackroyd was responsible for the state's first minimum wage orders and laws related to labor standards, including laws protecting workers making piece work in the then-booming jewelry industry. She was also the founder of the Commission on the Status of Women (now the Commission on Women) for the state of Rhode Island. She was appointed to the national Commission on the Status of Women in 1962. In 1968, was awarded an honorary doctorate by the University of Rhode Island.

Following retirement, Ackroyd continued to speak on women's, children's and labor issues; she acted as a roving ambassador for U.S. Department of Labor and a consultant to the Organization of American States.
