= Eric Fright =

English footballer

Personal information
- Date of birth: 10 September 1917
- Place of birth: Eastry, England
- Date of death: 27 July 1995 (aged 77)
- Place of death: Maidstone, England

Senior career*
Years	Team	Apps	(Gls)
- Bromley

International career
1948	Great Britain	4	(0)
- * Club domestic league appearances and goals

Eric G. Fright (10 September 1917 – 27 July 1995) was an English footballer who represented Great Britain at the 1948 Summer Olympics. Fright played amateur football for Bromley.
