= Brian Molony (footballer) =

Australian rules footballer

Personal information
- Full name: Brian "Muncher" Molony
- Born: 22 November 1932
- Died: 15 July 1995 (aged 62)
- Original teams: St Pat's, Ballarat
- Height: 183 cm (6 ft 0 in)
- Weight: 79 kg (174 lb)
- Position: Midfielder

Playing career^{1}
Years	Club	Games (Goals)
1952–55	Carlton	27 (6)
1956–58	St Kilda	41 (24)
Total		68 (30)
- ^{1} Playing statistics correct to the end of 1958.

Brian Molony (22 November 1932 – 15 July 1995) was an Australian rules footballer who played with Carlton and St Kilda in the Victorian Football League (VFL).
