= Cootamundra =

- Town
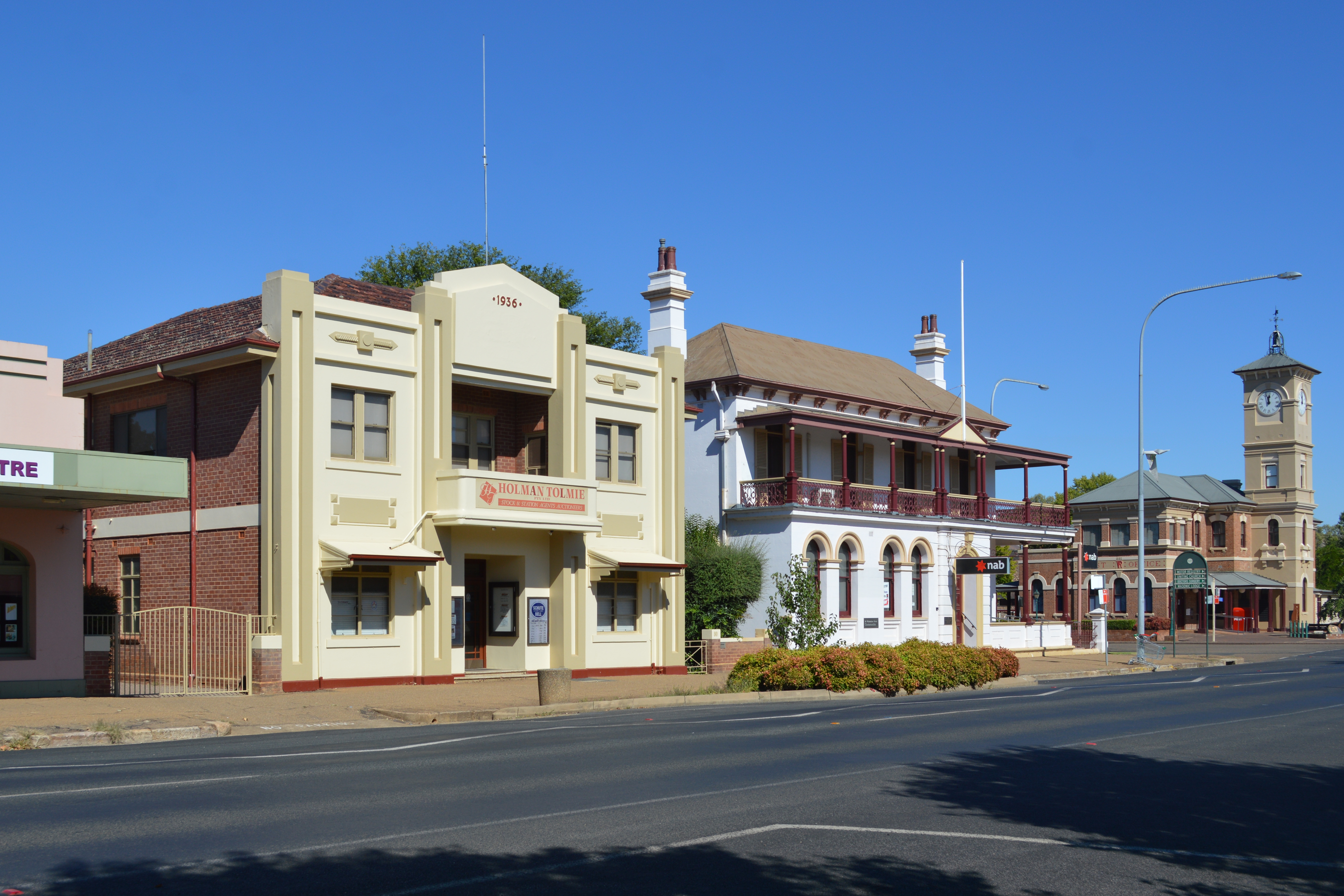
- The CBC bank building and post office on Wallendoon St

- Coordinates: 34°38′30″S 148°01′30″E
- Country: Australia
- State: New South Wales
- LGA: Cootamundra-Gundagai Regional Council
- Location: 390 km (240 mi) from Sydney; 161 km (100 mi) from Canberra; 53 km (33 mi) from Junee; 49 km (30 mi) from Young; 105 km (65 mi) from Yass
- Established: 1861

Government
  - State electorate: Cootamundra
  - Federal division: Riverina
- Elevation: 318 m (1,043 ft)

Population
  - Total: 5,732 (UCL 2021)
- Postcode: 2590
- County: Harden
- Mean max temp: 22.3 °C (72.1 °F)
- Mean min temp: 7.8 °C (46.0 °F)
- Annual rainfall: 614.3 mm (24.19 in)

Cootamundra, nicknamed Coota, is a town in the South West Slopes region of New South Wales, Australia and within the Riverina. It is within the Cootamundra-Gundagai Regional Council. It is located on the Olympic Highway at the point where it crosses the Muttama Creek, between Junee and Cowra. Its railway station is on the Main Southern line, part of the Melbourne-to-Sydney line.

Cootamundra is the birthplace of Sir Donald Bradman AC, an Australian cricketer universally regarded as the greatest batsman of all time. It is also known for being the site of Cootamundra Domestic Training Home for Aboriginal Girls, an institution housing Aboriginal girls who were forcibly taken from their families.

It is also the home of the Cootamundra wattle. Every year there is a large "Wattle Time" Festival held at the time the wattle starts to bloom, with an art show and festivities.

== History ==
The traditional owners of the area where present day Cootamundra exists are considered to be the Wiradjuri people, with the name "Cootamundra" probably deriving from the Wiradjuri language word guudhamang for "turtle".

Ken Loiterton argues that the name, for many years spelled "Cootamundry", derives from "Coramandra", the name of a property owned by John Hurley and James Fitzpatrick in tribute to a ship Coromandel, which brought settlers to the area in the 1840s, and written "Cotamandra" by Fitzpatrick (c. 1797 – 27 July 1882) in 1844.

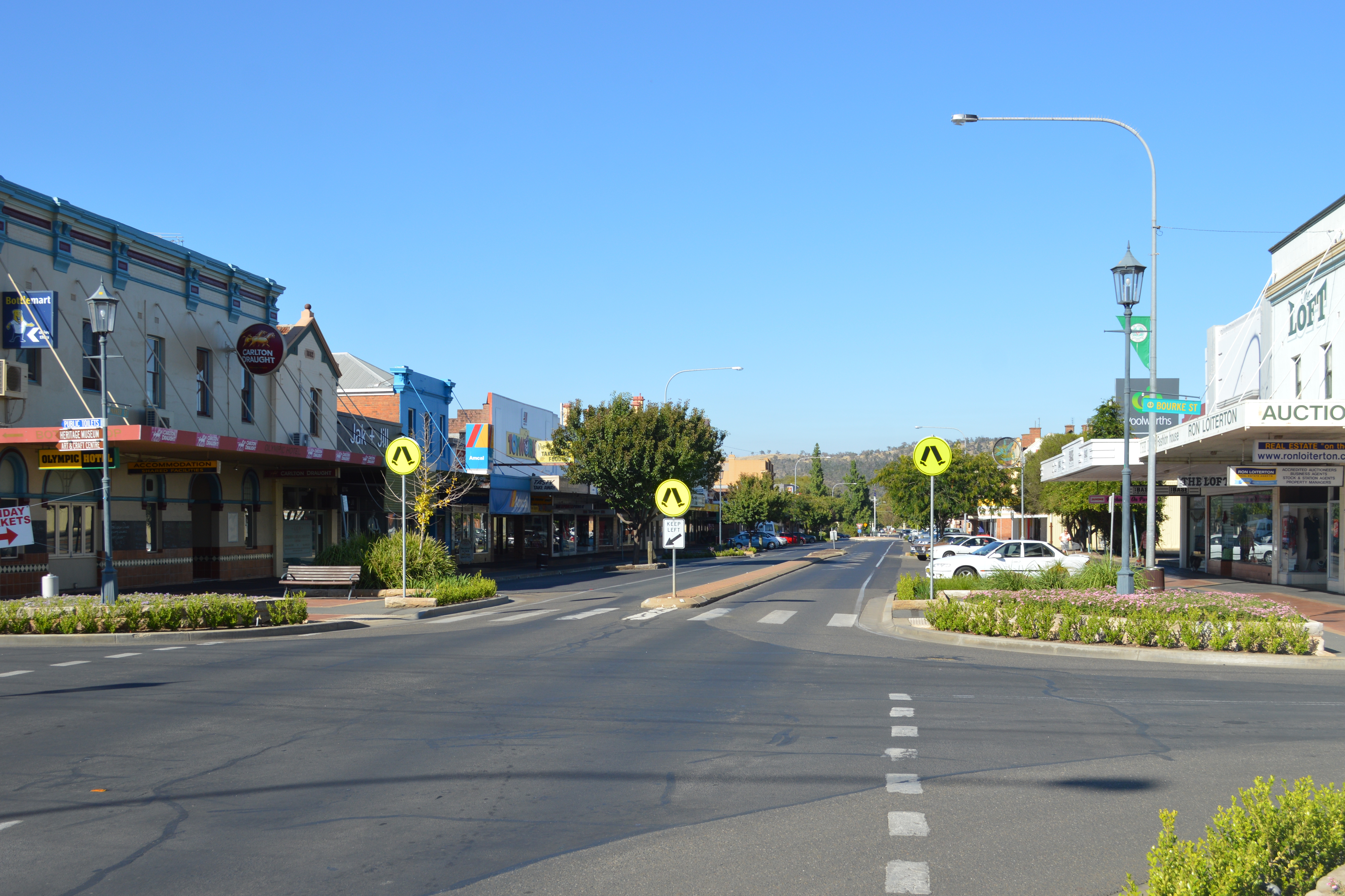
Parker St, the main street of Cootamundra

Cootamundra was incorporated as a township on 9 August 1861, and the first settlers bought their lots in early 1862. Like many other towns in the Riverina, it was originally populated by those attracted by the gold rush of the 1860s but became a quiet yet prosperous agricultural community after the local deposits were exhausted. However, the potential sale of a recently disused mine near Adelong may have piqued the curiosity of would-be prospectors.

The town's rugby league team, the Cootamundra Bulldogs, competed in the Maher Cup.

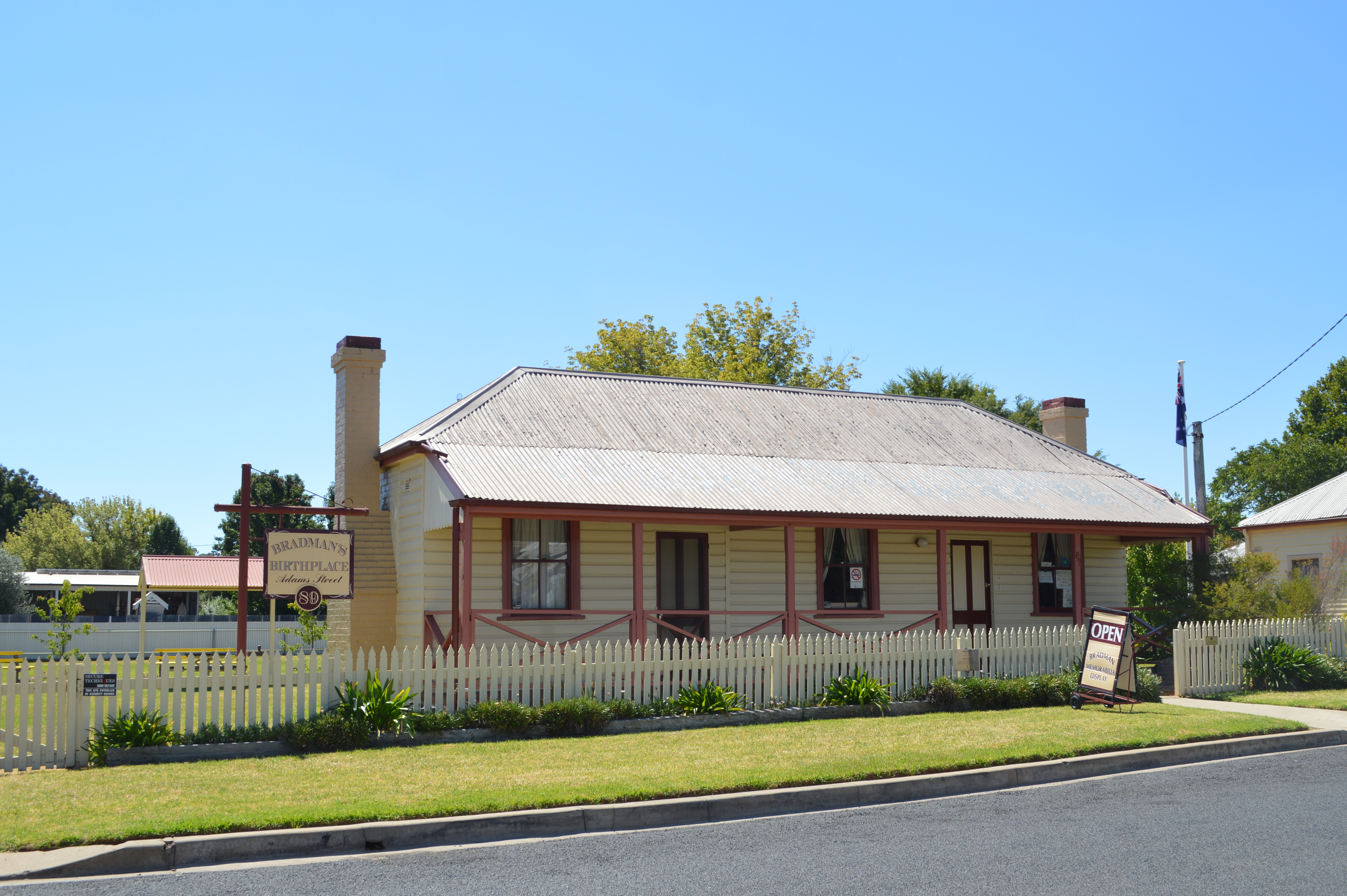
Birthplace of Sir Donald Bradman

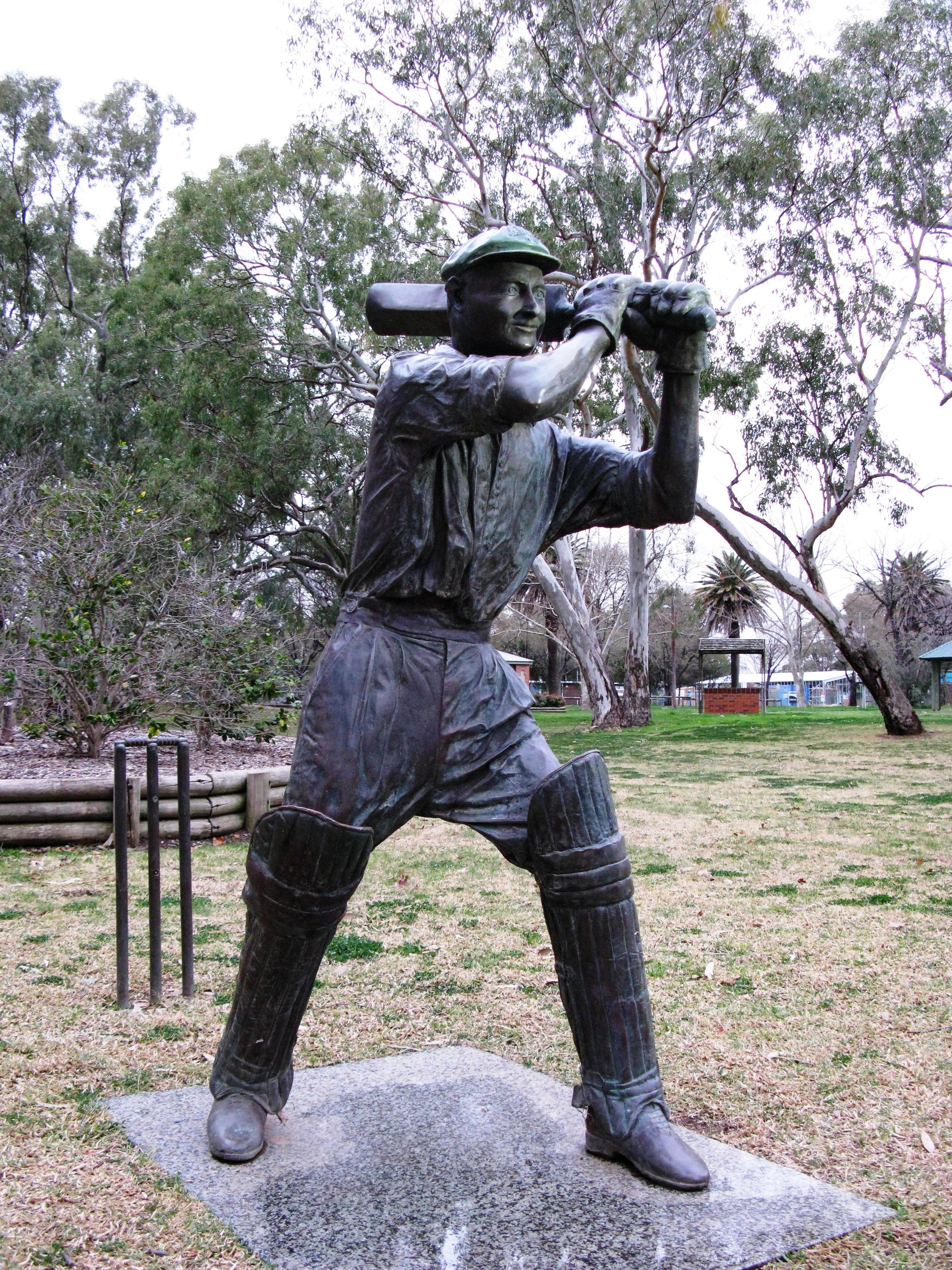
Bradman statue in Jubilee Park

=== Timeline ===
- 1837 – John Hurley and Patrick Fennell licensed to stock Coramundra Run
- 1847 – Cootamundry Run, a large stock run, is the first colonist settlement in the area.
- 1860 – Plan of proposed village drawn up by surveyor Philip Francis Adams
- 1861 – The site of Cootamundry is published in the NSW Government Gazette
- 1862 – Gold mining commences at the nearby 'Muttama Reef' mine.

First town lots sold by auction at Gundagai

- 1864 – The first church (Anglican) and post office are established
- 1874 — Convent for the Presentation Order of nuns opened by (Catholic) Bishop of Goulburn
- 1875 – The first school in the district opens.
- 1877 – First issue of Cootamundra Herald published by Frederick Pinkstone and Thomas Campbell Brown

Cootamundra's railway connection opens on 1 November.
Public school opens on Cooper Street

- 1878 – Christ Church (Anglican) of England opens
- 1879 – St Columba's (Catholic) church opens
- 1881 – Post Office (the current building) opened
- 1882 – First Show held at Albert Park
- 1884 – Cootamundra is gazetted as a municipality and John Frederick Barnes elected first mayor.
- 1885 — Salt Clay Creek railway disaster - seven killed and dozens injured when culvert collapsed
- 1886 – Solomon Cohen establishes his store, corner of Wallendoon and Parker streets
- 1889 – First hospital opens on hill north east of the town, became Bimbadeen Aboriginal Girls' Home in 1911.
- 1893 – Dam on Hardy's Folly Creek constructed as town's water supply, but never satisfactory

Bank of NSW building (the current Westpac) constructed
Farmers' and Settlers' Association founded

- 1896 – Cootamundra Cycling Club. It is probably the oldest continual club in NSW, although as was the case with most clubs it went into recess during the war years.
- 1903 – Flood 23 April
- 1908 – Donald Bradman (later Sir Donald) is born in Cootamundra.
- 1911–1968 – Cootamundra Domestic Training Home for Aboriginal Girls opens in former hospital.
- 1919 – Flood 6 December
- 1920 – 23 February arrival of Ross and Keith Smith after the first flight from England to Australia
- 1926 – 10 December "Black Friday" bushfires
- 1928 – Cootamundra is first town to receive Burrinjuck hydro-electric power.
- 1933 – Water from Burrinjuck replaces supply from bores and Hardy's Folly Dam.
- 1942 – On 3 December, the corvette HMAS Cootamundra, named for the town, is launched.
- 1951 – Cootamundra Jazz Band is formed by John Ansell.
- 1952 – Name of Cootamundry officially changed to Cootamundra.
- 1955 – The first Cootamundra Annual Classic cycling handicap race, one of the oldest open races in NSW.
- 1956 – Cootamundra's rugby league football club's Bill Marsh is first selected to play for the Australian national team.
- 1960 – Cootamundra Blues Australian rules football club is established.
- 1982 – In November 1982, aviation company Masling Industries is formed. This was restructured in June 1993 after the death of its owner.
- 1986 – Popular Australian singer/songwriter/bush poet John R Williamson releases his song 'Cootamundra Wattle'.
- 1998 – Phase 1 of Cricket Captains' Walk declared open; all busts the work of Harden–Murrumburrah sculptor Carl Valerius
- 2000 – The first annual beach volleyball competition. Truckloads of sand are deposited in a main street for "Coota Beach" (punning reference to Kuta Beach in Bali, Indonesia).
- 2015 – Australian youth radio station Triple J featured the 'Cootamundra bonus weather rap'.

=== Churches ===
The first churches in Cootamundra were:

Primitive Methodist

Rev. Smith was minister from around 1874, succeeded by J. Spalding, who was minister in 1877, and services were held on alternate Sunday afternoons.

Wesleyan Methodist

The church, seating 100 persons, was opened on 17 December 1876. Rev. G. Thompson was minister in 1878 and services were held regularly. In 1880 Rev. R. East was the only minister resident in the town.

Anglican

Christ Church opened on 12 July 1878; the vicar W. Cocks shared with Murrumburrah. In January 1880 Rev. S. B. Holt left Gundagai to take up the position.

Roman Catholic

Eighty confirmations were performed in 1875 in conjunction with a jubilee attended by Bishop Lanigan of Goulburn and Fathers Bermingham (Burrowa), Dunne and O'Dwyer (Gundagai), and Hanley (Goulburn). Mass was held fortnightly in the schoolroom by visiting priests from Gundagai. St Columba's church was consecrated on 30 November 1879. The first resident pastor was Rev. Richard Butler in 1881.

=== Military history ===
During World War II, Cootamundra was the location of RAAF No.3 Inland Aircraft Fuel Depot (IAFD), completed in 1942 and closed on 14 June 1944. It was located in an area of land near the intersection of Olympic Highway and Thompson Street. Usually consisting of 4 tanks, 31 fuel depots were built across Australia for the storage and supply of aircraft fuel for the RAAF and the US Army Air Forces at a total cost of £900,000 ($1,800,000).

It was also home to the No 1 Air Observers School, commemorated by a plaque at Cootamundra Airfield.

A plane from the No. 31 Beaufighter Squadron, RAAF, from Wagga Wagga, crashed nearby on 21 September 1942 during training exercises, resulting in the death of Flt/Sgt J. E. Jenkins and Sgt V. Sutherst. A memorial alongside the main road to Young, dedicated on 28 April 1990, is regularly tended. See Gallery below.

=== Heritage listings ===
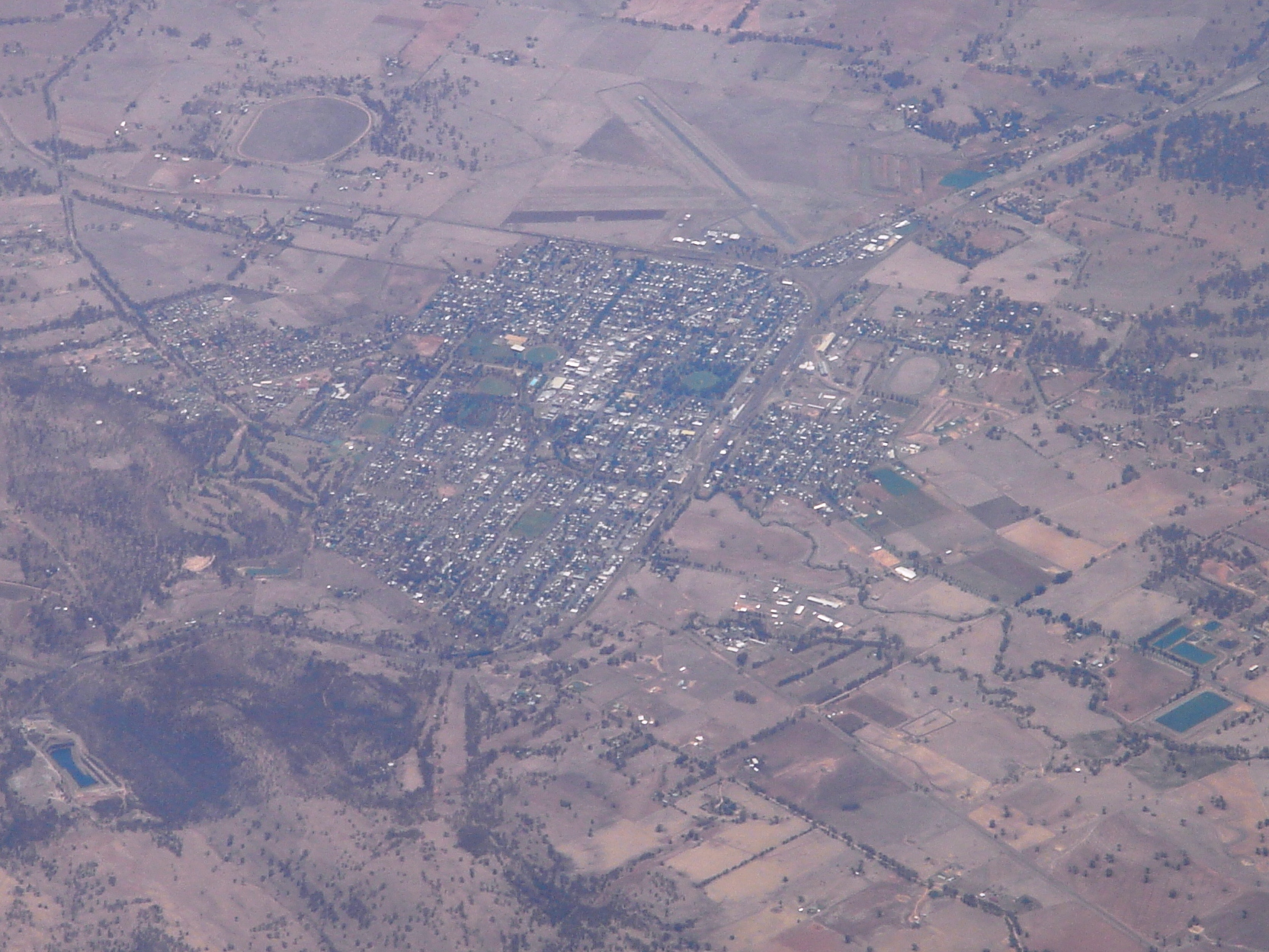
Aerial view of Cootamundra

Cootamundra has a number of heritage-listed sites, including:

- Cootamundra-Griffith railway: Cootamundra West railway station
- Main Southern railway: Cootamundra railway station
- 39 Rinkin Street: Cootamundra Domestic Training Home for Aboriginal Girls
- 219 Sutton Street: Cootamundra World War II Fuel Depot

== Description and attractions ==
Cootamundra is located in the South West Slopes region of New South Wales, within the Riverina region.

It is within the local government area of Cootamundra-Gundagai Regional Council. Abb McAlister was elected mayor of the newly-formed Cootamundra-Gundagai Regional Council on 21 September 2017.

The town is known as the birthplace of the great cricketer Sir Donald Bradman. Although he never lived in the town and his parents left Yeo Yeo (some 18 km from Cootamundra) when he was two, the town celebrates this connection with the Sir Donald Bradman Birthplace Museum, the home where "The Don" was born, a fully restored visitors' site featuring cricketing memorabilia and artefacts.

The Coota Ex-Services Club is an ex-servicemen's club that is open to the public as a restaurant.

Hemet, California, is a sister city.

=== Cricket Captains' Walk ===
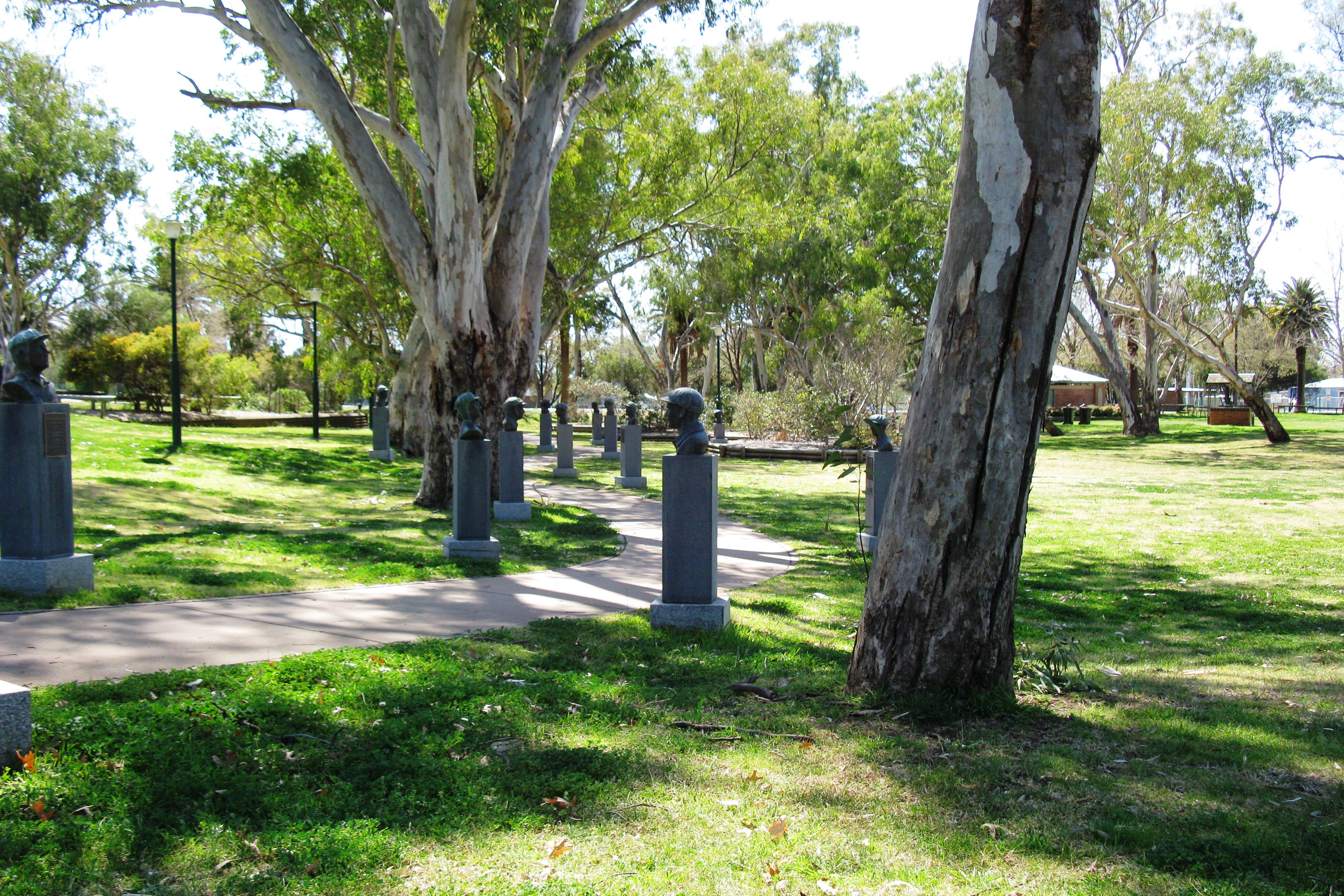
Cricket Captains' Walk

In 1998 a collection of 14 bronze busts depicting captains of the Australia International Test XI cricket team was unveiled in Jubilee Park, adjacent the Caravan Park. Specially commissioned, they were all the work of Harden-Murrumburrah sculptor Carl Valerius.

In 2008 a further 30 busts were installed on either side of a looping path, making a full set of Australian Test cricket captains, with three more added in 2020 to bring the list up to date. These are by various artists from the Tom Bass sculpture studio. The all-weather path, which starts and ends at Wallendoon Street is family, jogger, and wheelchair friendly, and approximately 250 metres long. In 2024 the busts were re-assembled into a more formal arrangement, around a rectangular path.

A life-sized bronze statue of Bradman in action, also by Valerius, is nearby, as is a barbecue and playground. Jubilee Park, the site of these attractions, is on land reclaimed from the original stock dam, memorialised by a plaque on the Morgan Arch on Wallendoon Street.

=== The Giant ===
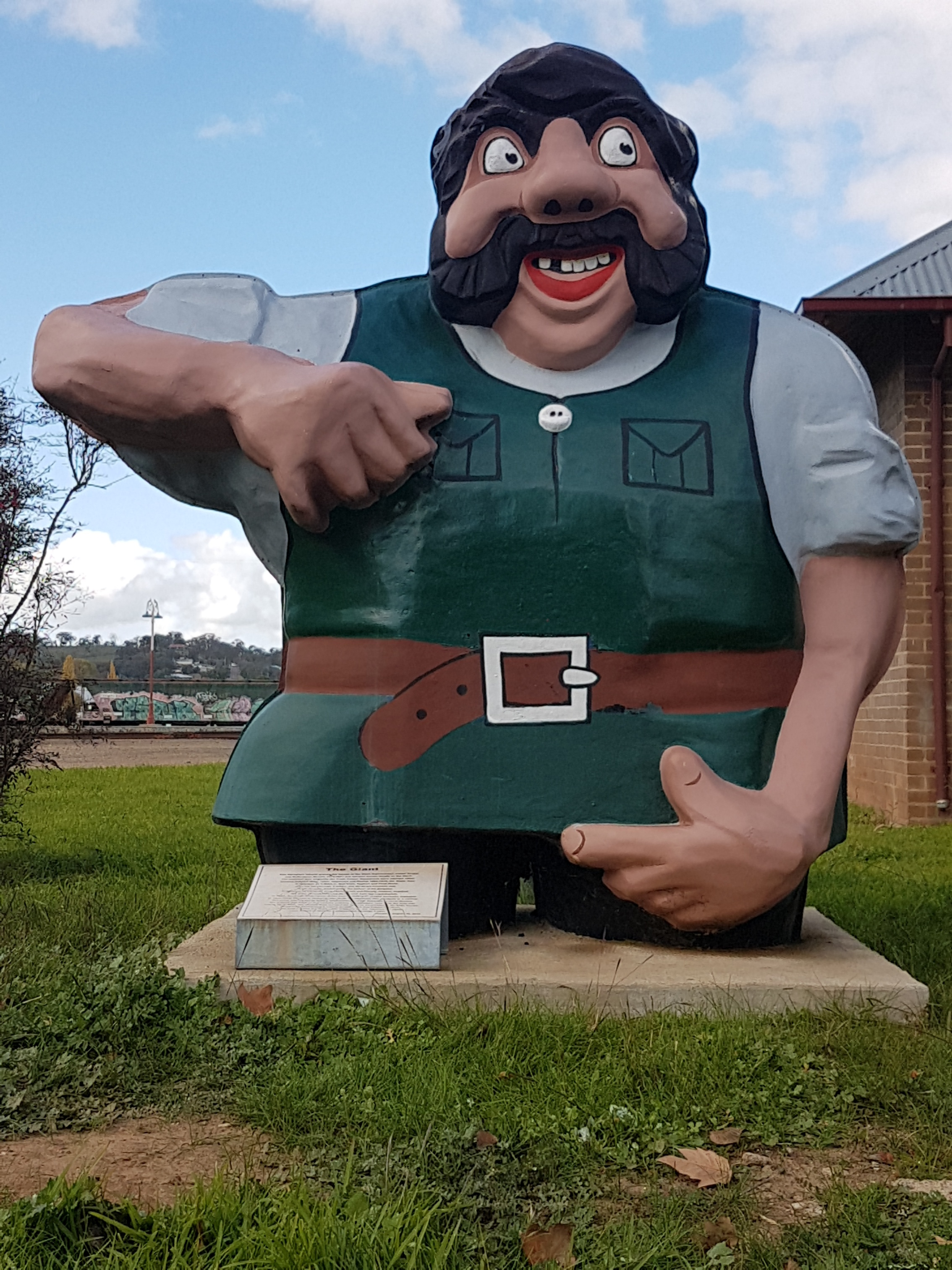
"The Giant"

The large effigy of a fairytale giant gesturing towards to his crotch was created by an unknown artist around 1975 in fibreglass as a mascot for "The Giant Supermarket" on the corner of Cooper and Wallendoon streets.

This location was in 1882 the site of Kibby's "Trade Palace" department store; and taken over by Solomon Cohen (c. 1848–1922) in 1886. In 1943 it became "Cohen's Corner", a name which endures to this day. "Hammond and Hanlon" were tenants in 1962 and "The Giant" in 1975, subsequently "U-Mark-it", "Half-case Warehouse", "Payless", and "Food World". It next became Mark Ward's hardware store, then "GV Bargains".

When the statue was taken down it was purchased by Allan and Phuong Jenkins, who ran a florist shop nearby. In 1985 Allan participated in a Round-Australia marathon run by Rotary International and the Australian Cancer Society as a fundraiser, and his support vehicle was surmounted by "The Giant". In 2014 the Jenkins couple donated the statue to the Cootamundra Heritage Centre.

Local artist Jim Newman did its original paintwork back in 1975, and his brother Robert Newman was responsible for its restoration in 2015. The statue is located alongside the Heritage Centre on Hovell Street, near the railway station.

The Giant, along with Don Bradman's Bat and Stumps in Bradman Oval, are considered to be two of Australia's many Big Things.

== Population ==
According to the 2016 Australian census, there were 6,782 people in Cootamundra. Of these:

- Aboriginal and Torres Strait Islander people made up 5.6% of the population.
- 85.6% of people were born in Australia. The next most common country of birth was England at 2.1%.
- 91.6% of people spoke only English at home.
- The most common responses for religion were Catholic 30.8%, Anglican 28.4% and No Religion 16.4%.

Historical population
Year	Pop.	±%
1921	1,748	—
1933	4,683	+167.9%
1947	5,259	+12.3%
1954	5,760	+9.5%
1961	5,939	+3.1%
1966	6,219	+4.7%
1971	6,530	+5.0%
1976	6,384	−2.2%
1981	6,540	+2.4%
1986	6,314	−3.5%
1991	6,386	+1.1%
1996	5,879	−7.9%
2001	5,486	−6.7%
2006	5,566	+1.5%
2011	5,579	+0.2%
2016	5,669	+1.6%
2021	5,732	+1.1%
Source: Australian Bureau of Statistics data.

== Transport ==
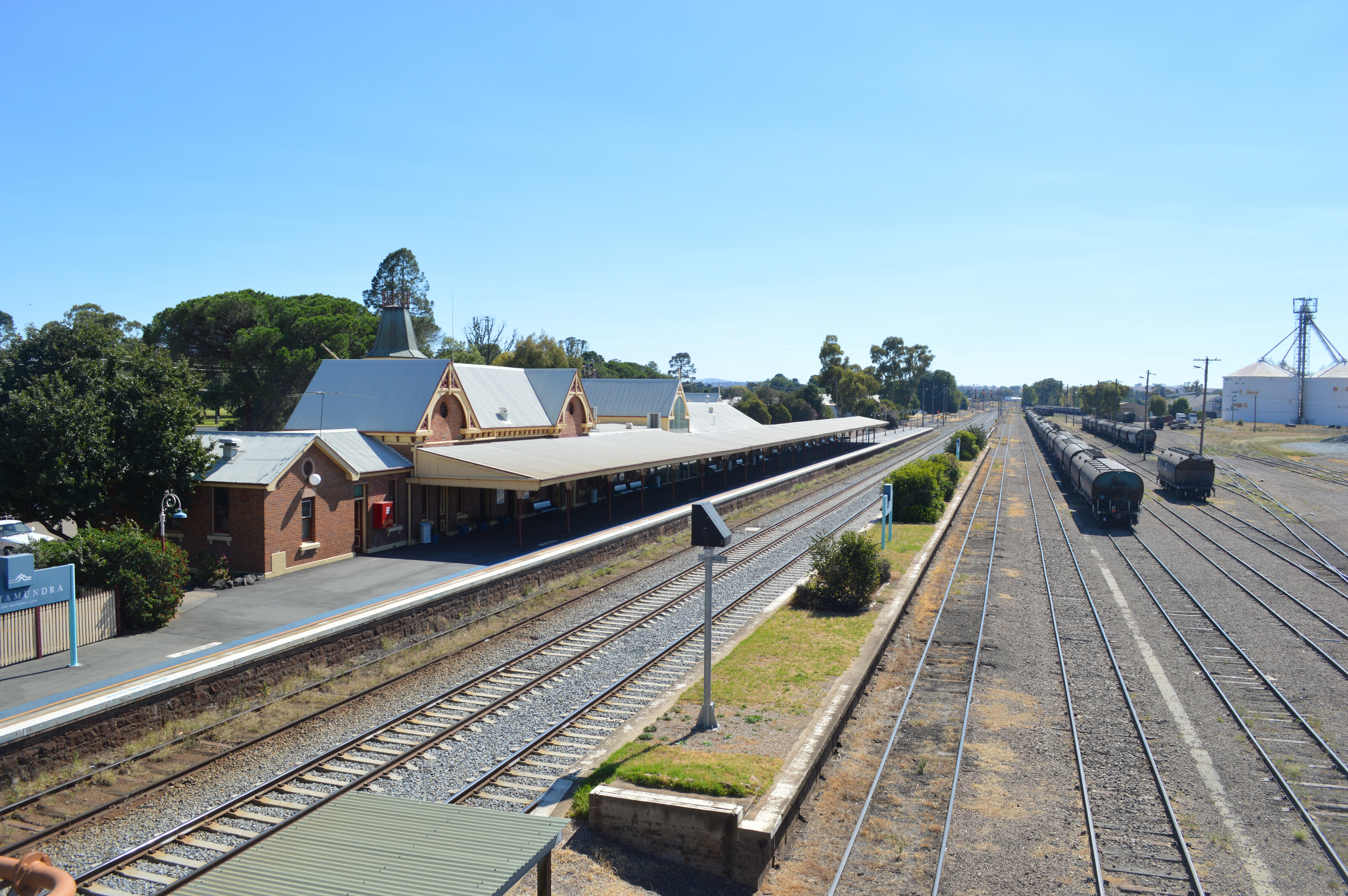
Cootamundra railway station

Cootamundra railway station is located on the Main Southern railway line, with passengers served in each direction by twice daily NSW TrainLink XPT railway services between Sydney and Melbourne, and the twice weekly Xplorer railway services to Griffith. Interstate freight trains also pass through the town.

Regional Rail Logistics previously operated a containerised freight service from Junee to Sydney stopping in the town.

Preceding station	NSW TrainLink	Following station
Junee towards Griffith or Melbourne	NSW TrainLink Southern Line Griffith Xplorer; Melbourne XPT	Harden towards Sydney

=== TrainLink coaches ===
Cootamundra acts as a hub for coach services, run by Transport for NSW, to other regional centres with departures and arrivals timed to connect with certain New South Wales XPT train arrivals. The exception is Services 704/703 (coloured row), provided for those who have business in Canberra civic, the major hospitals, or to connect with the Canberra–Sydney rail service (three trains per day both directions).

Seats are allocated and must be booked ahead. must be consulted for conditions of travel and coach stop locations. On-line booking and more information

Destination/s	Other stops	Service #	Frequency	Return #	Frequency	Notes
Condobolin	see timetable	717	Daily	718	Daily	
Tumbarumba	see timetable	723	Tue/Thu/Sun	724	Tue/Thu/Sun	
Griffith, Hay, Mildura	see timetable	725	Daily	726	Daily	~20 min. refreshment stop at Hay
Yass Junction, Canberra, Queanbeyan	see timetable	782	Daily	781	Daily	~15 min. stop at Yass Junction. Wheelchair access
Parkes, Dubbo	see timetable	791	Mon/Wed/Sat	792	Sun/Tue/Thu	Wheelchair access
Orange, Bathurst	see timetable	793	Tue/Thu/Fri/Sun	794	Mon/Wed/Fri/Sat	
Major stop on route: Wagga Wagga–Cootamundra–Canberra–Queanbeyan	see timetable	704	Tue/Thu/Sat (morning)	703	Tue/Thu/Sat (evening)	currently (2019) a trial service, trial timetable, Wheelchair access

=== Airport ===
Cootamundra Airport, is one of the oldest country airports outside of Mascot to be continually licensed.

From 1991 to 2002 local business Country Connection Airlines offered regional flights from Cootamundra to Sydney, as well as to many other regional locations such as West Wyalong, Cowra, Forbes and Young.

== Sport ==
Cootamundra has a long sporting history; most notably, it is the birthplace of Sir Donald Bradman, a test cricketer.

Today, the most popular sport in Cootamundra is rugby league. The local team, the Cootamundra Bulldogs, compete in the George Tooke Shield competition, which is part of the broader Canberra Rugby League. The club formerly competed in the Group 9 Rugby League competition, in which they were among the most successful clubs, winning nine titles, and their junior sides remain in this league. The club famously produced Les Boyd, whom the club's home ground is named after, Eric Weissel, and Paul Field, a local player who was picked to represent New South Wales in the 1983 State of Origin series, one of only three players to ever be selected for the side from a Country Rugby League club.

Cootamundra also has an Australian rules football side, nicknamed the Blues, who play in the AFL Canberra lower divisions, and a rugby union team, the Cootamundra Tri-Colours, in the Central West Rugby Union Division 3 South. The region also has a strong local cricket competition.

There is also an Association Football team in Cootamundra, named the Cootamundra Strikers, who compete in Football Wagga Wagga and play their home matches at O'Connor Park. As well as Cootamundra Strikers there is also a junior team, Cootamundra J.S.C who compete in the South West Slopes Soccer League.

== Notable residents ==
- Paul Beath (born 1968) – represented the Canberra Raiders and Manly Sea Eagles in the NRL
- Les Boyd (born 17 November 1956) – grew up representing the Cootamundra Bulldogs in the Group 9 Rugby League, became a professional Rugby League Player, representing Australia and NSW in the State of Origin.
- Thomas Bradley (born 1990) – Australian dancer for Sydney Dance Company and Australian Dance Theatre
- Sir Donald Bradman AC (27 August 1908 – 25 February 2001) – Australian international cricketer, born in Cootamundra
- Bob Holder – rodeo champion described as the 'world's oldest cowboy.'
- Graeme Inson (1923–2000) – painter, son of Ryan & Inson co-founder
- Philip Lowe (born 1961) – Governor of the Reserve Bank of Australia, moved to Cootamundra aged 5
- Hayley Manwaring (born 1991) – Guitarist in Australian rock band Moaning Lisa
- Billy Murdoch (1854–1911) – batsman and Test cricket captain, was a solicitor in private life, and had a practice in Cootamundra in the 1880s.
- Hubert Leslie Primrose (1880–1942) – solicitor and politician
- Isaac Smith (30 December 1988) – AFL footballer
- E. A. Southee (1890–1968) – college principal
- Eric Weissel (1903–1972) – Professional Rugby League Player

== Climate ==
Cootamundra has hot, dry summers interspersed with severe thunderstorms and the odd cold front, and cool, mostly cloudy winters with many rain days. Snow can occur during the winter months, with the most recent snowfall having occurred in August 2019. Under the Köppen climate classification scheme, the town has a humid subtropical climate (Cfa), receiving enough precipitation to avoid the cold semi-arid (BSk) climate classification.

Climate data for Cootamundra Airport (1995–2022); 335 m AMSL; 34.63° S, 148.04° E
Month	Jan	Feb	Mar	Apr	May	Jun	Jul	Aug	Sep	Oct	Nov	Dec	Year
Record high °C (°F)	45.0 (113.0)	43.0 (109.4)	39.7 (103.5)	33.5 (92.3)	27.0 (80.6)	22.0 (71.6)	20.5 (68.9)	24.8 (76.6)	30.2 (86.4)	34.9 (94.8)	41.0 (105.8)	42.2 (108.0)	45.0 (113.0)
Mean daily maximum °C (°F)	32.1 (89.8)	30.4 (86.7)	27.2 (81.0)	22.7 (72.9)	17.5 (63.5)	13.9 (57.0)	13.0 (55.4)	14.6 (58.3)	18.3 (64.9)	22.4 (72.3)	26.1 (79.0)	29.3 (84.7)	22.3 (72.1)
Mean daily minimum °C (°F)	16.1 (61.0)	15.5 (59.9)	12.4 (54.3)	7.5 (45.5)	3.5 (38.3)	2.2 (36.0)	1.2 (34.2)	1.5 (34.7)	3.5 (38.3)	6.3 (43.3)	10.4 (50.7)	13.0 (55.4)	7.8 (46.0)
Record low °C (°F)	2.0 (35.6)	2.9 (37.2)	0.9 (33.6)	−4.0 (24.8)	−6.5 (20.3)	−7.3 (18.9)	−7.8 (18.0)	−7.0 (19.4)	−6.0 (21.2)	−3.5 (25.7)	−1.4 (29.5)	2.1 (35.8)	−7.8 (18.0)
Average precipitation mm (inches)	49.3 (1.94)	52.3 (2.06)	53.9 (2.12)	35.3 (1.39)	38.0 (1.50)	60.7 (2.39)	58.5 (2.30)	58.4 (2.30)	52.9 (2.08)	48.6 (1.91)	64.6 (2.54)	52.7 (2.07)	614.3 (24.19)
Average precipitation days (≥ 0.2 mm)	6.8	5.4	6.5	5.1	7.6	10.8	12.9	11.8	9.0	8.5	8.4	6.7	99.5
Average afternoon relative humidity (%)	33	38	38	43	53	66	65	61	53	46	39	36	48
Source: Bureau of Meteorology

== Some street names ==
- Parker St. is named for NSW premier Henry Parker.
- Sutton St. is (mis)named for one or other of the Suttor family: William Suttor Jr perhaps.
- Hovell St. for the explorer William Hovell

== In popular culture ==
- In The Two Ronnies' sketch "The Australians", Cootamundra is the location of their travel agency.
- Leonard Hubbard recorded the song "Cootamundra" in 1924.
- The Cootamundra Jazz Band (1951–1960) was one of Australia's foremost Dixieland groups
- John Williamson recorded the song "Cootamundra Wattle" in 1986.
- Cootamundra was long described as the town of "railway engines, wide streets and white ways" (illuminated roads)

== Gallery ==
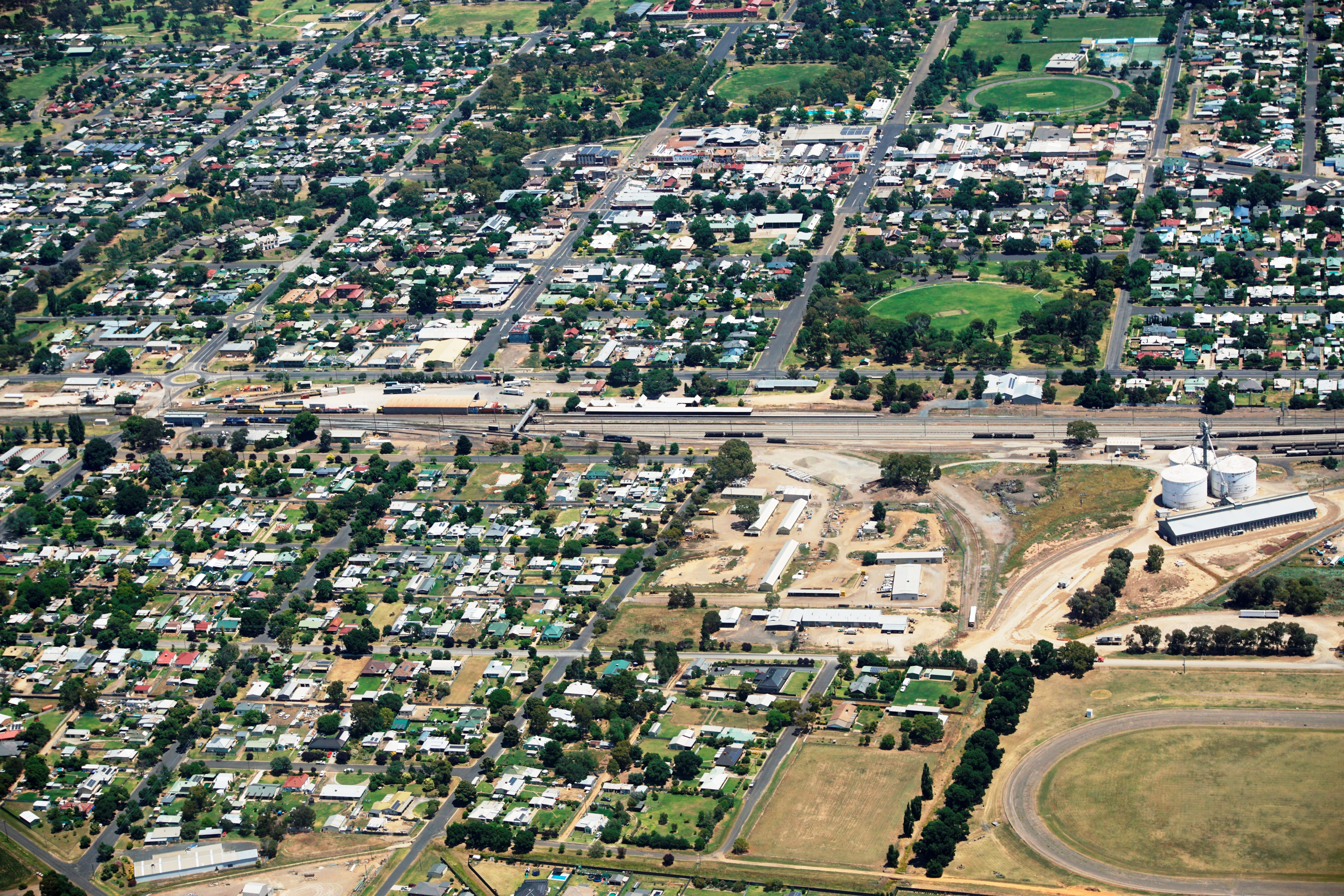
Cootamundra looking NE; railway station at centre

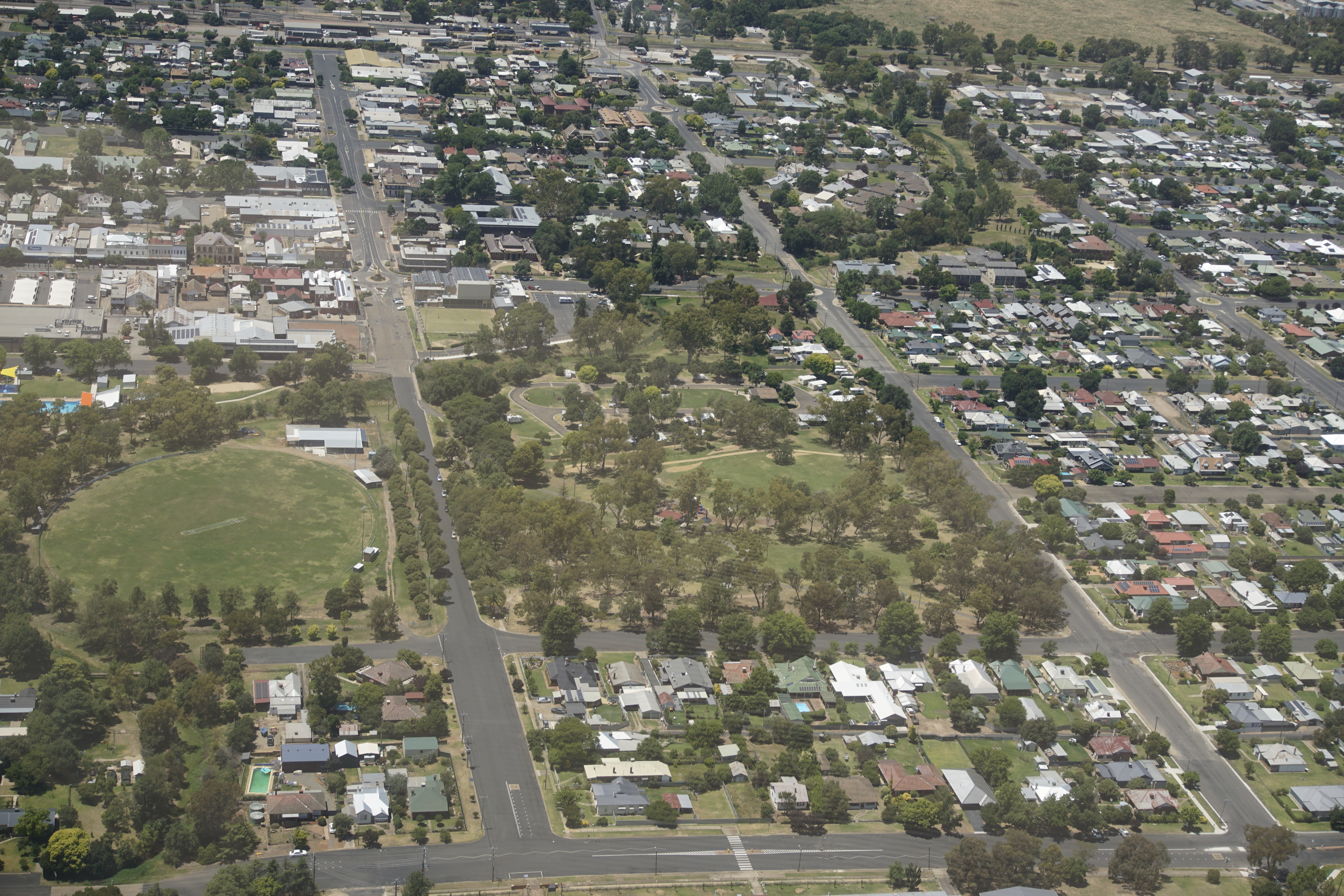
Cootamundra looking SW, railway station at top

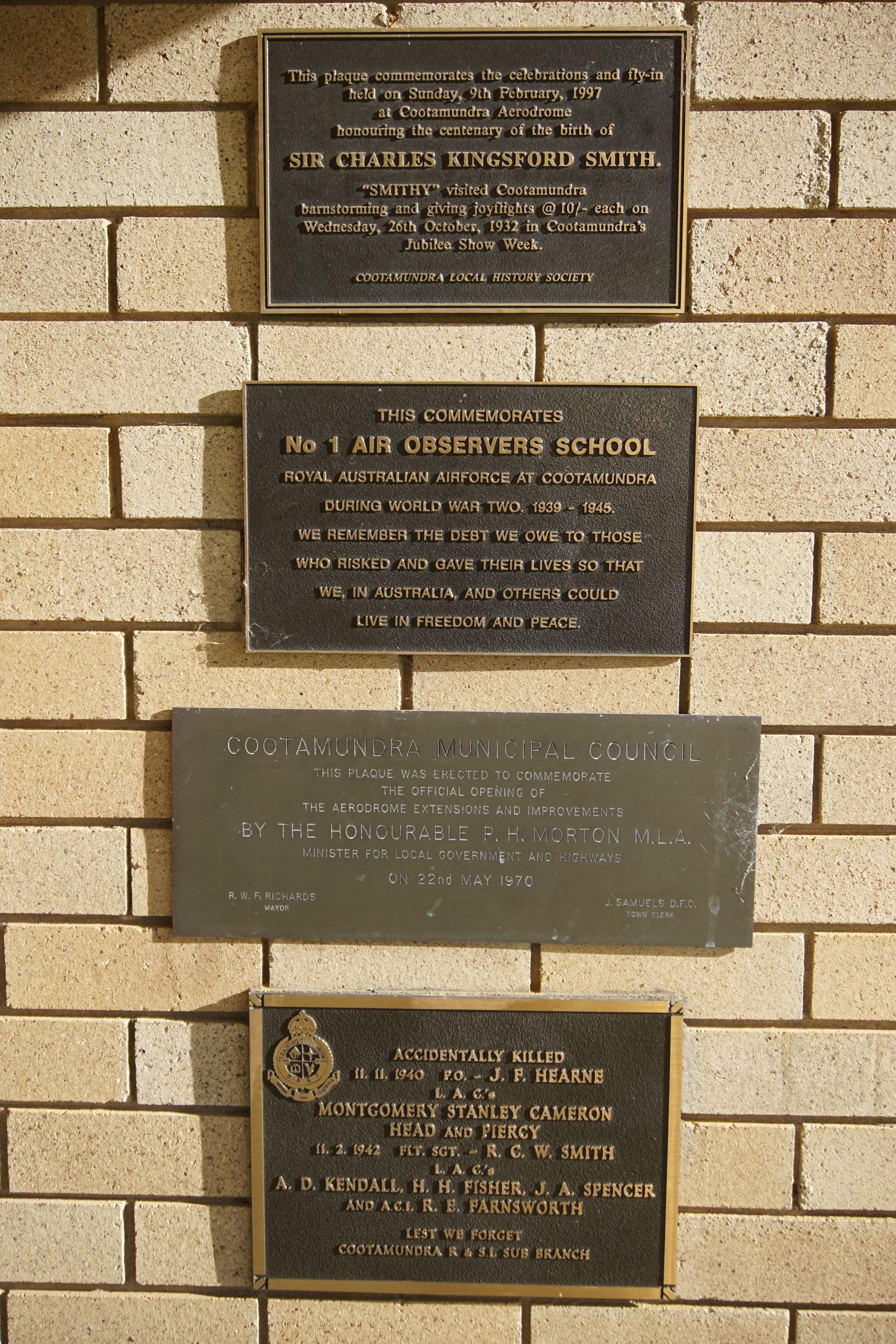
Plaques at Aerodrome

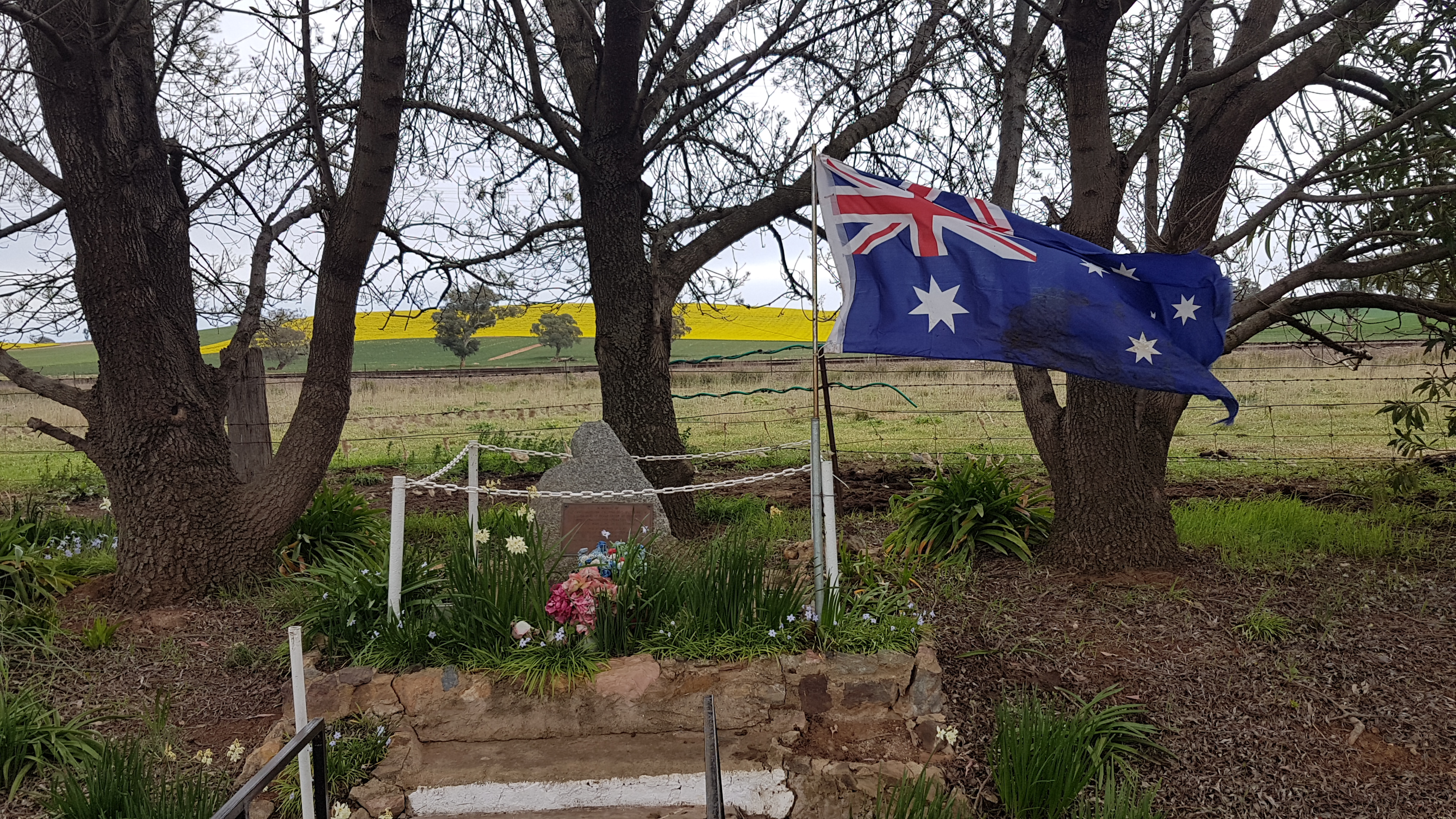
Roadside memorial

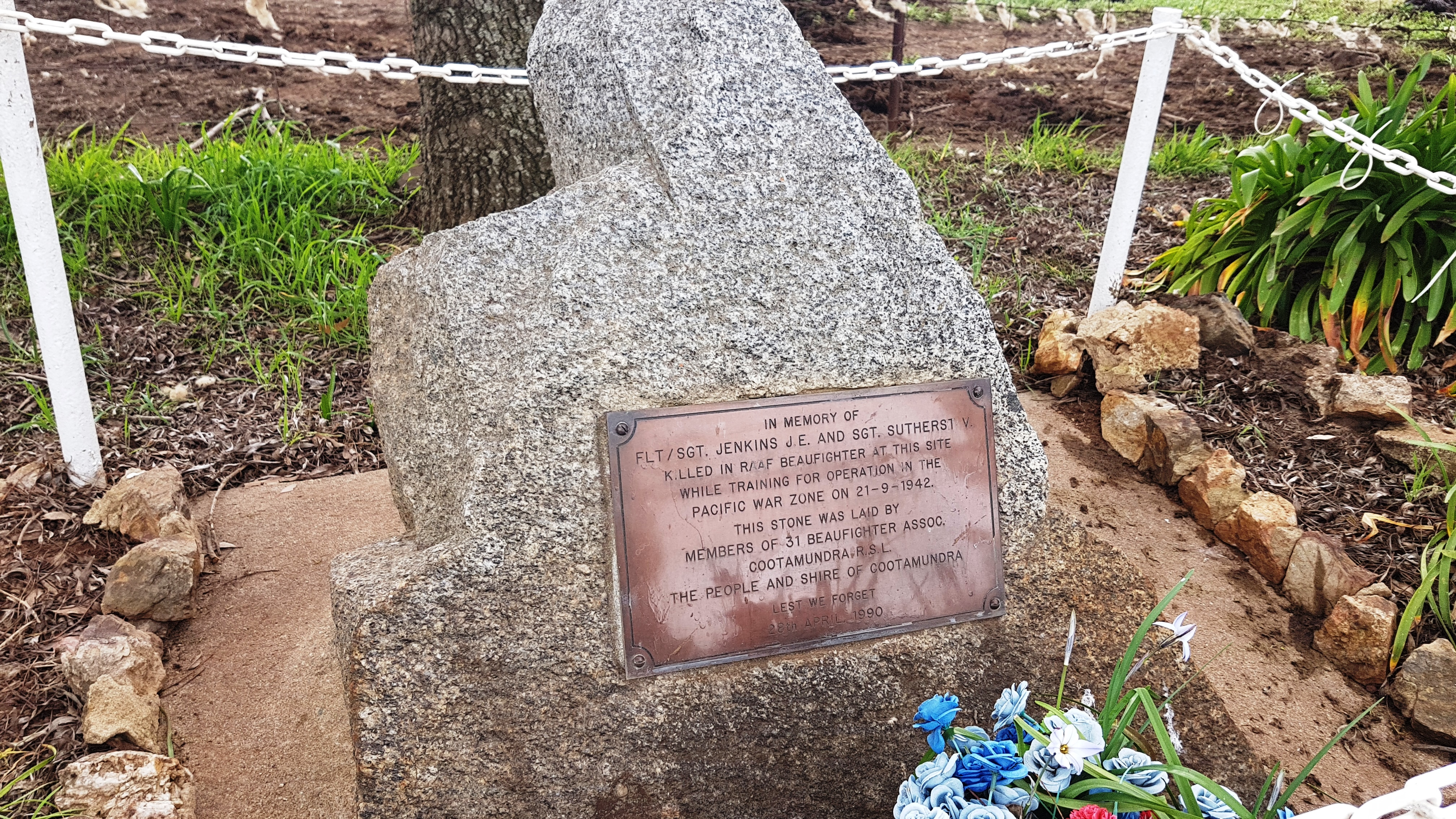
Roadside plaque

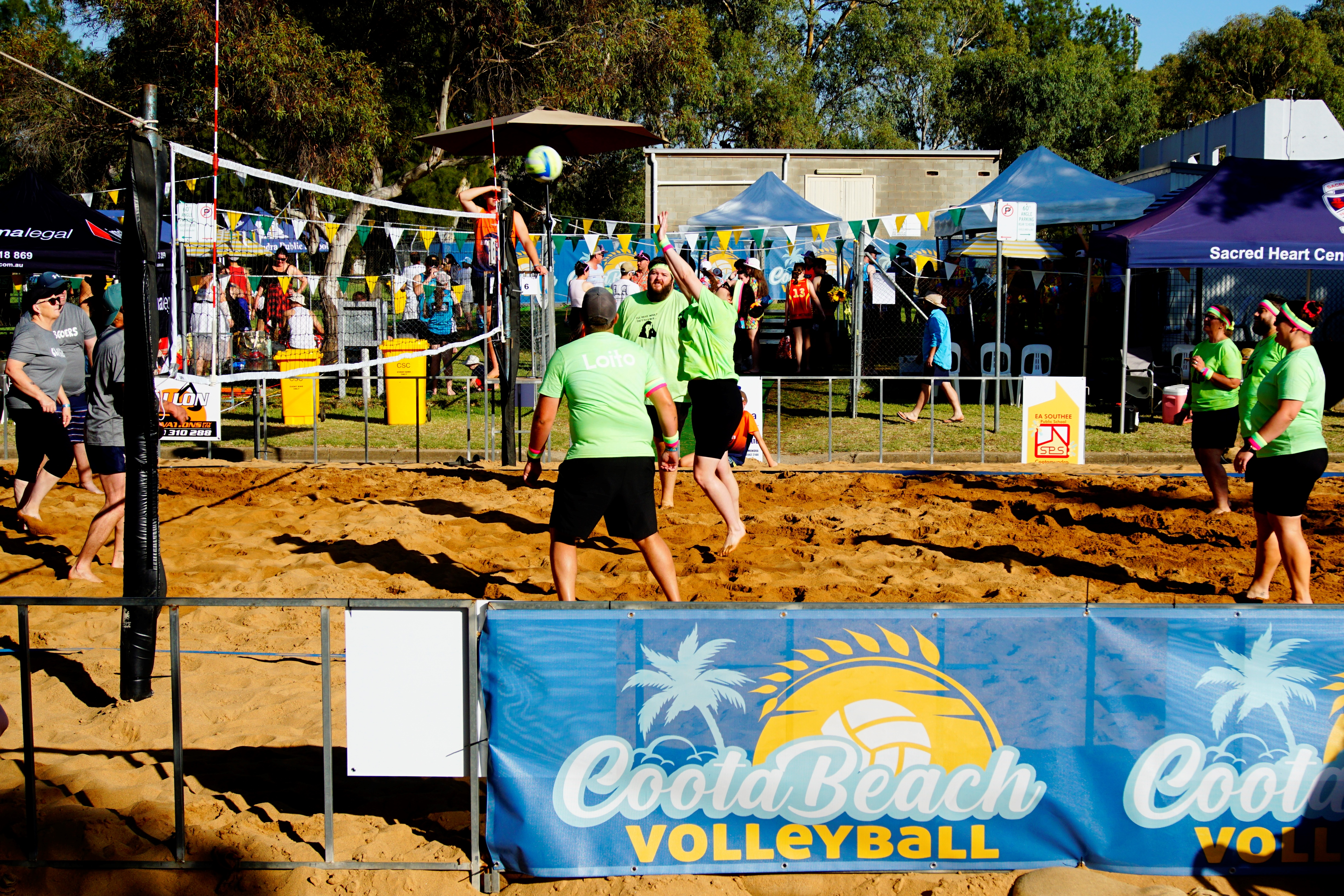
Coota Beach Volleyball

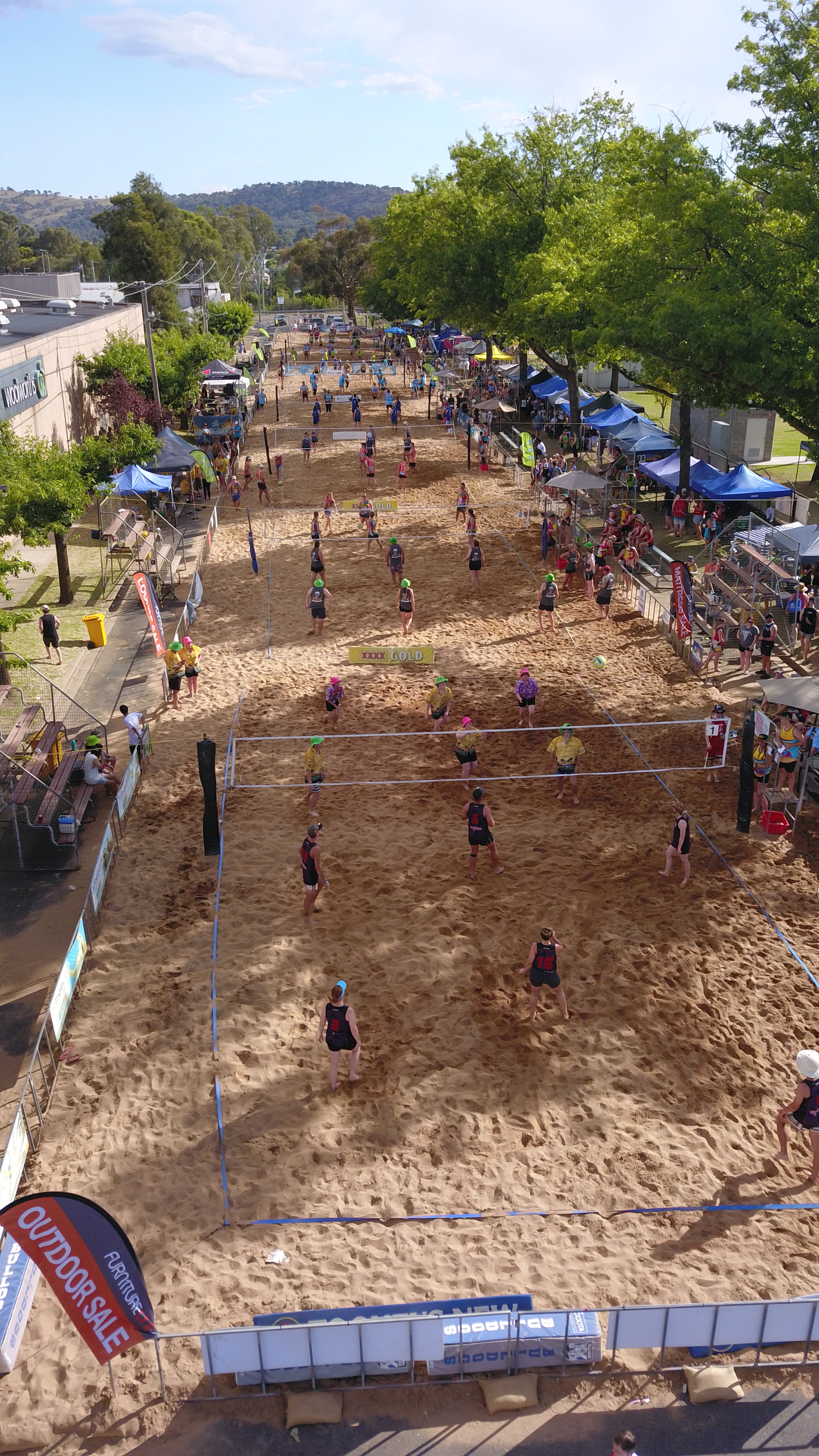
Murray St. transformed

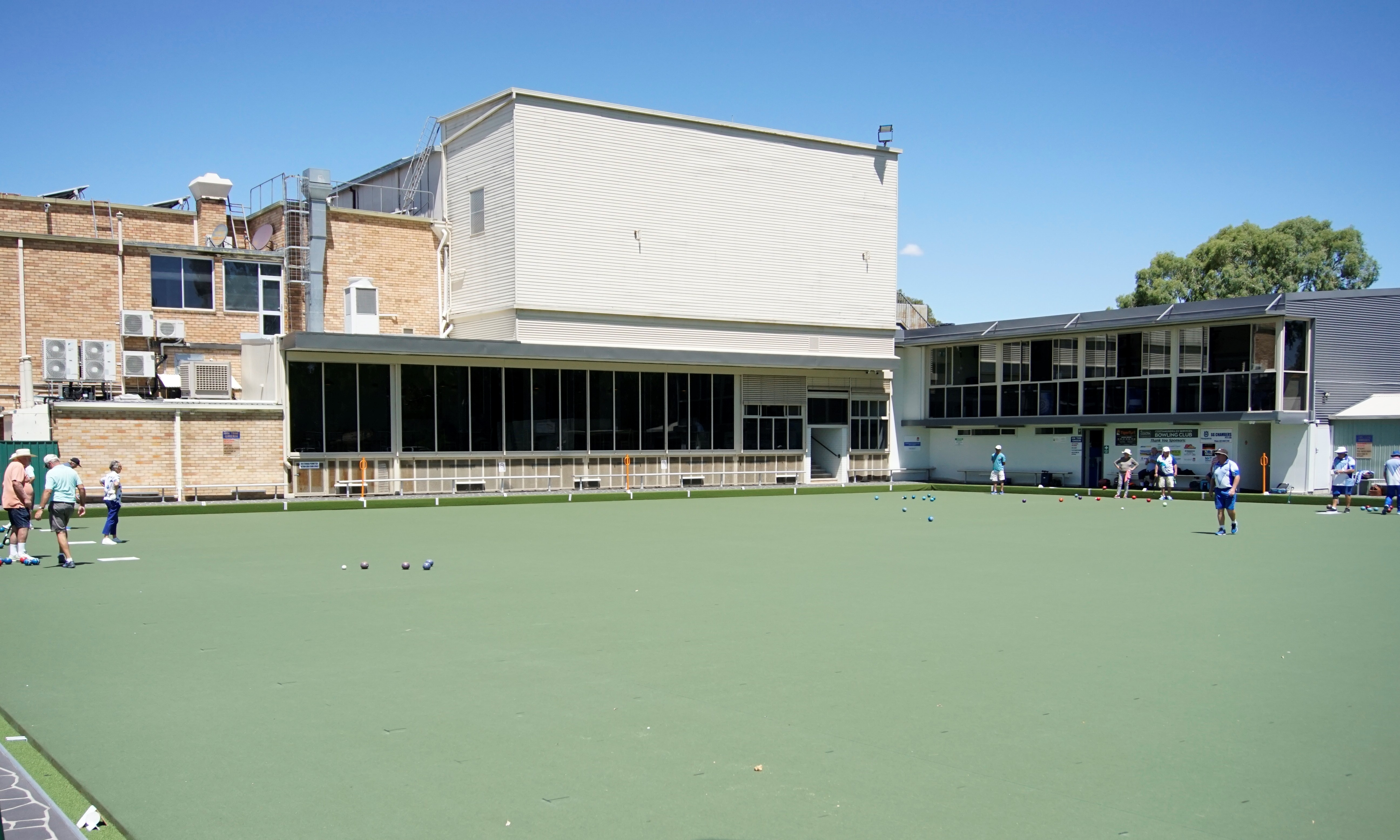
Services Club bowling green
