= Harry Madison =

Canadian wrestler

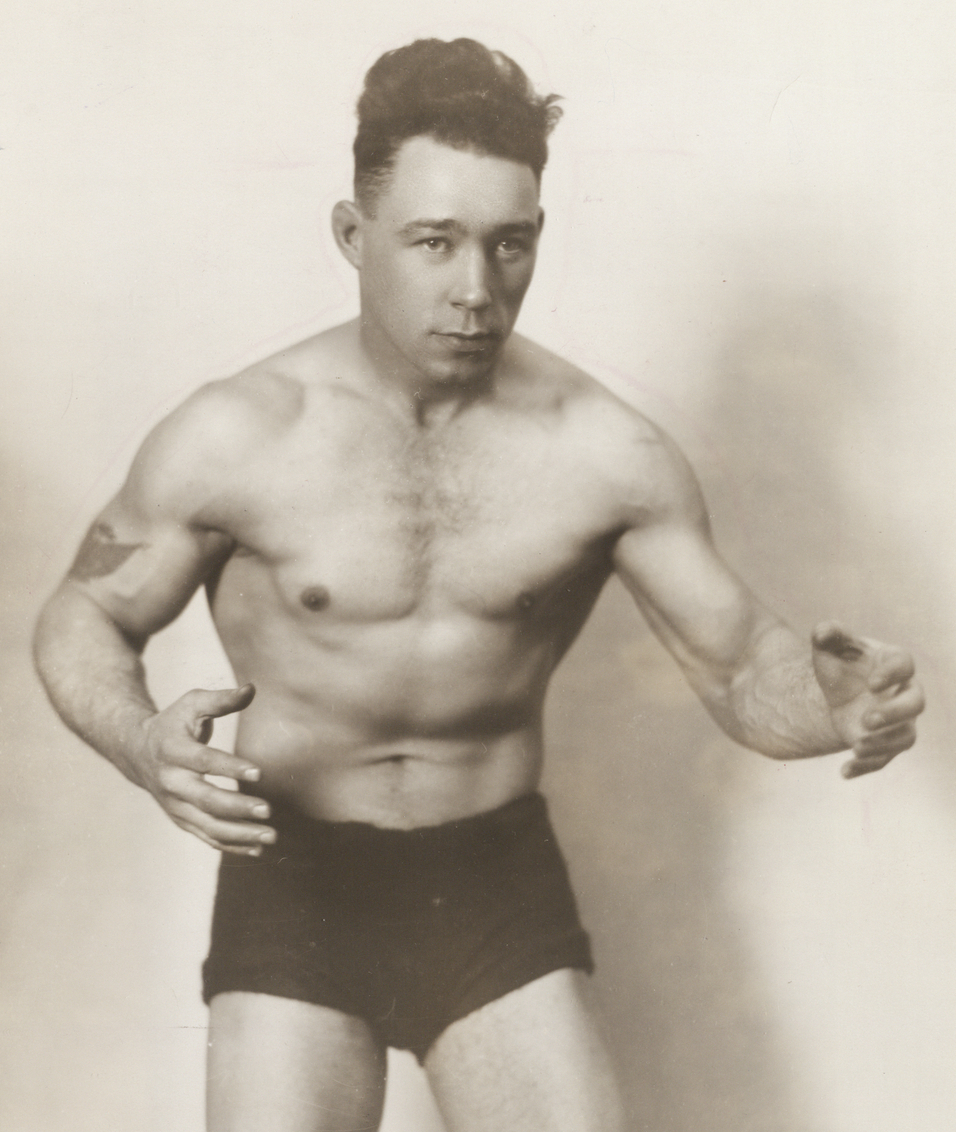

Personal information
- Born: 7 September 1909 Verdun, Quebec, Canada
- Died: 31 July 1995 (aged 85) Sainte-Agathe-des-Monts, Quebec, Canada

Sport
- Sport: Wrestling

Harry Madison (7 September 1909 – 31 July 1995) was a Canadian wrestler. He competed in the men's freestyle light heavyweight at the 1932 Summer Olympics.

== Championships and accomplishments ==
- Ray LaMontagne Promotions
  - NWA World Junior Heavyweight Championship (Quebec version) (4 times)
