= Noel Orange =

Australian rules footballer

Personal information
- Full name: Noel Campbell Orange
- Born: 10 August 1939
- Died: 14 July 1995 (aged 55)
- Original team: Yarraville
- Height: 191 cm (6 ft 3 in)
- Weight: 83 kg (183 lb)
- Position: Defence

Playing career^{1}
Years	Club	Games (Goals)
1965–66	South Melbourne	24 (3)
- ^{1} Playing statistics correct to the end of 1966.

Noel Campbell Orange (10 August 1939 – 14 July 1995) was an Australian rules footballer who played with South Melbourne in the Victorian Football League (VFL).
