= Billabong Creek (Junee) =

River in New South Wales, Australia

Coordinates: 34°55′S 147°48′E

Billabong Creek Billabung Creek
- Etymology: Aboriginal: an effluent from a river, sometimes separated from it, sometimes being joined again at time of flood.

Location
- Country: Australia
- State: New South Wales
- IBRA: South West Slopes
- Local government area: Junee

Physical characteristics
- Source confluence: Ironbong and Turveys Falls Creeks
  - location: near Illabo
  - elevation: 271 m (889 ft)
- Mouth: confluence with the Murrumbidgee River
  - location: east of Wantabadgery, west of Gundagai
  - elevation: 201 m (659 ft)
- Length: 44 km (27 mi)

Basin features
- River system: Murrumbidgee catchment, Murray–Darling basin

The Billabong Creek, a perennial river of the Murrumbidgee catchment within the Murray–Darling basin, is located in the South West Slopes region of New South Wales, Australia.

== Course and features ==
Formed by the confluence of the Ironbong and Turveys Falls Creeks, Billabong Creek rises west of Bethungra, northeast of the village of Illabo, and flows generally south southeast, then south by west, before reaching its confluence with the Murrumbidgee River, east of Wantabadgery, west of Gundagai. The river descends 70 metres (230 ft) over its 44 kilometres (27 mi) course.

== See also ==
- Rivers of New South Wales
- List of rivers of New South Wales (A–K)
- List of rivers of Australia
