= Dirnaseer, New South Wales =

Dirnaseer New South Wales
- Coordinates: 34°38′S 147°46′E
- Population: 89 (SAL 2021)
- Postcode(s): 2666
- Elevation: 299 m (981 ft)
- Location: 50 km (31 mi) from Cootamundra; 42 km (26 mi) from Temora
- LGA(s): Junee Shire
- County: Clarendon
- State electorate(s): Cootamundra
- Federal division(s): Riverina

Dirnaseer is a locality in the north east part of the Riverina and situated about 42 kilometres south east of Temora and 50 kilometres west of Cootamundra. At the 2006 census, Dirnaseer had a population of 170 people.

== History ==
"Dirnaseer" was the name of an extensive sheep run operated by Henry Scott & Sons, later Scott Bros. (Murray and Percy) from 1906 to around November 1919, when they sold it to the State Government for subdivision into soldier-settler blocks.

The property "Dirnaseer" adjoined part of George Main's property "Retreat"; George and his brother Hugh Main, who owned a separate part of "Retreat" were well disposed towards the soldier-settlers, and were instrumental in getting the Soldiers' Hall started. Dirnaseer Hall was opened on 15 October 1924 with a dance floor area 40 by 30 feet (12.2 m × 9.1 m), plus kitchen and ladies' change room.

In 1940 George Main's daughter Mary married Clive Caldwell at the Dirnaseer chapel. The reception was held the previous day at the Albion Hotel, Cootamundra, to cater for their large number of friends, far more than could be accommodated in a tiny country chapel.

Information is needed as to what extent "Dirnaseer" station is congruent with the locality.
