= Clarendon County =

Clarendon County may refer to:

- Clarendon County, New South Wales, Australia
- Clarendon County, South Carolina, USA
