= Eurongilly, New South Wales =

Eurongilly New South Wales
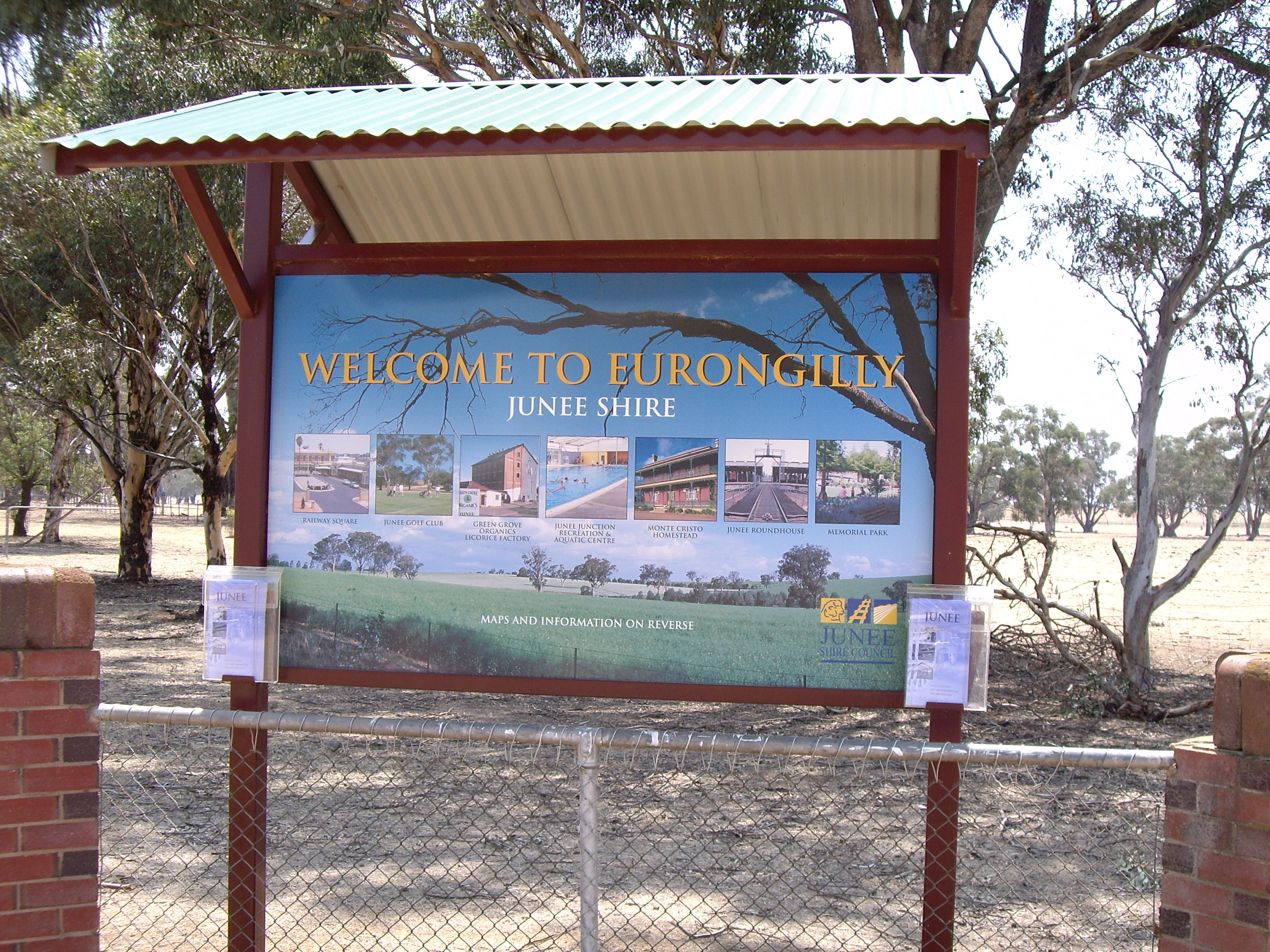
- Entering Eurongilly

- Coordinates: 34°57′S 147°46′E
- Population: 91 (SAL 2021)
- Postcode(s): 2663
- Elevation: 294 m (965 ft)
- Location: 19 km (12 mi) from Nangus
- LGA(s): Junee Shire
- County: Clarendon
- State electorate(s): Cootamundra
- Federal division(s): Riverina
| Mean max temp | Mean min temp | Annual rainfall |
| 46.0 °C; 115 °F | -5.8 °C; 22 °F | 929.17 mm 36.6 in |

Eurongilly is a locality in the central part of the Riverina and situated about 19 kilometres north west of Nangus and 21 kilometres south east of Junee.

Clarendon Post Office was opened on 1 January 1866, and was renamed Eurongilly in 1886. It was then closed in 1926.

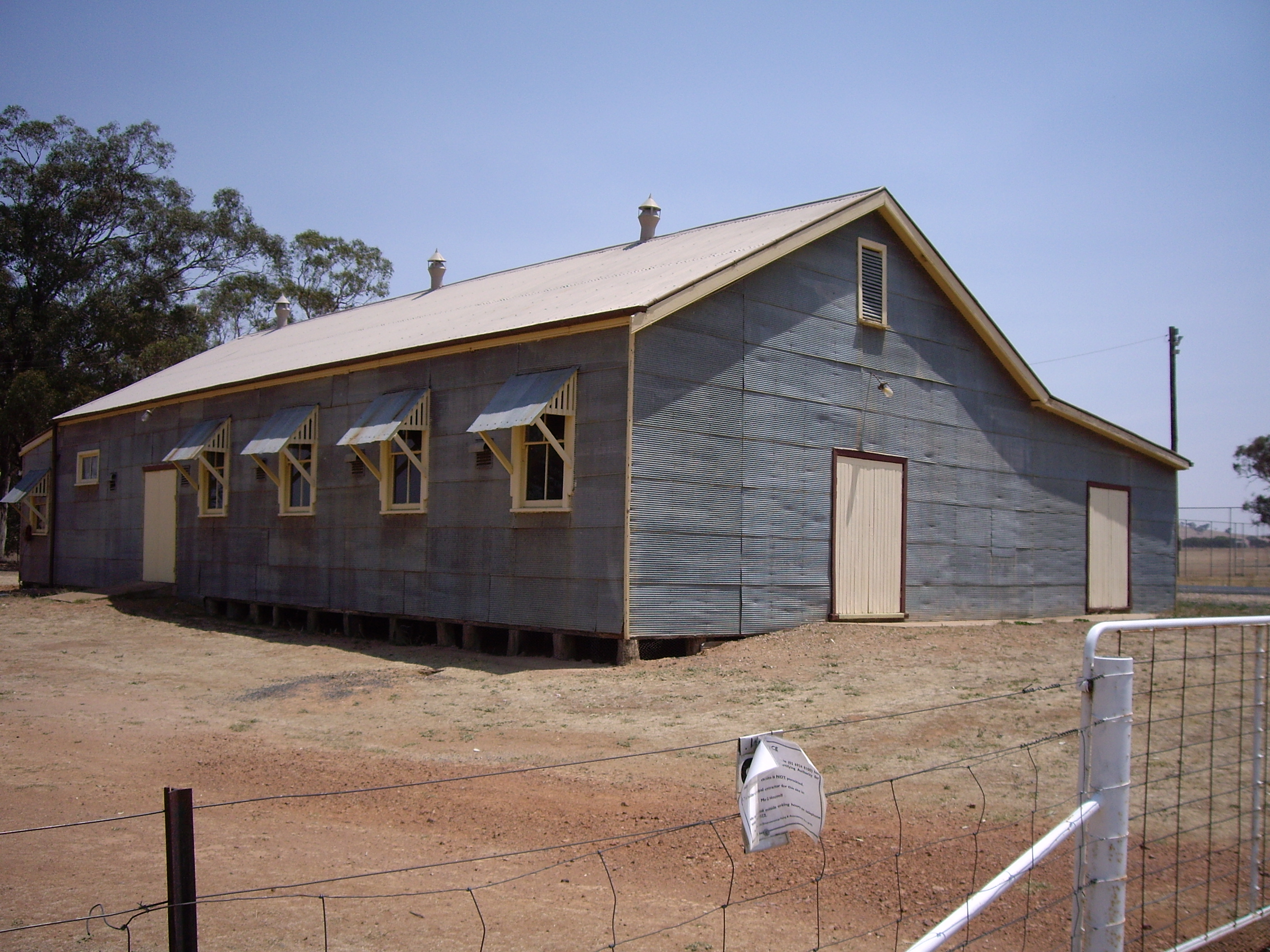
Eurongilly Hall

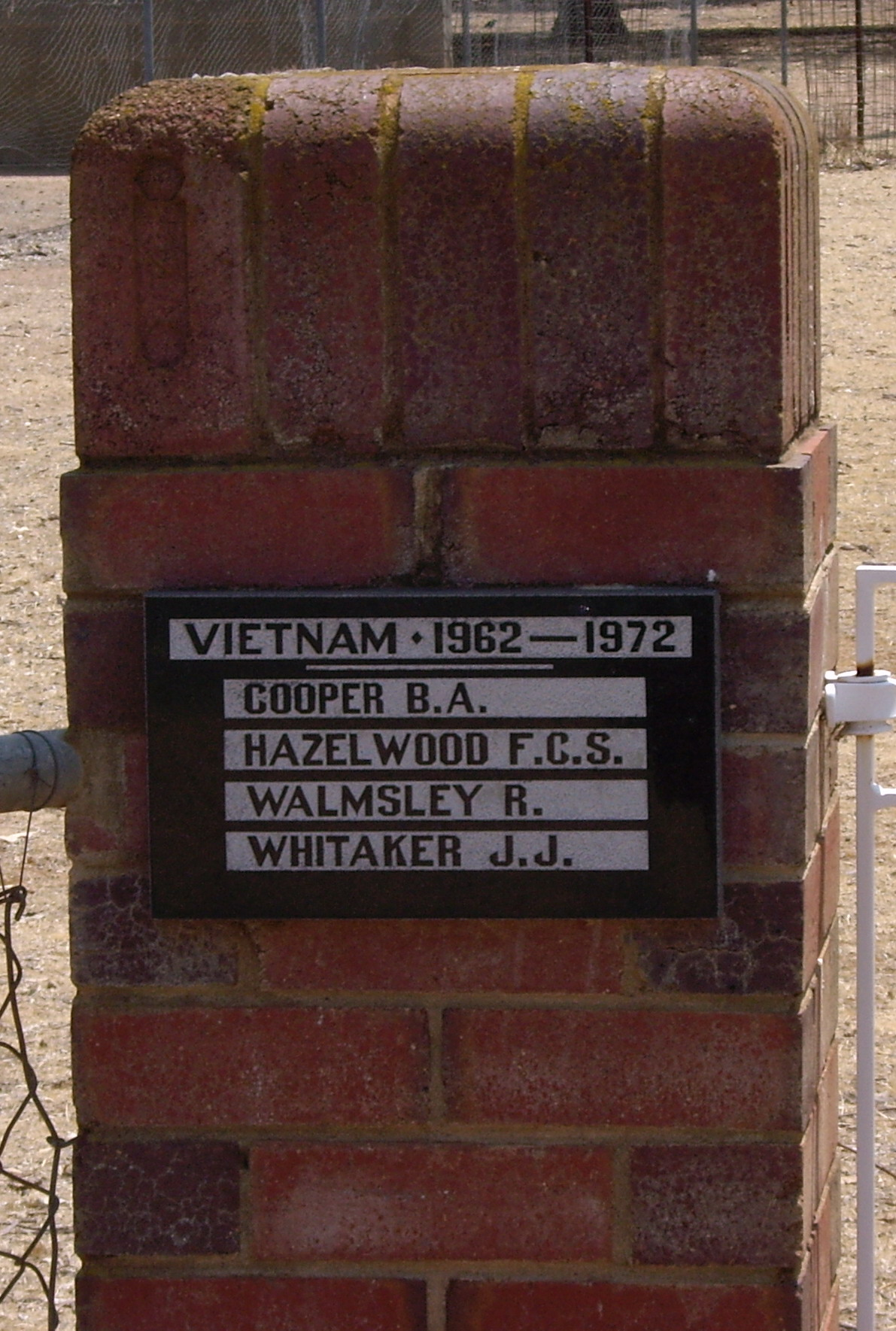
Eurongilly - Vietnam War those that served

Eurongilly is a typical example of the country town acceptance of the call to arms requests that occurred during the history of Australia. Despite its tiny stature, (there are no buildings in Eurongilly other than the Hall (see image) and the Bush Fire Brigade shed) the area proudly remembers those that served on the commemorative gate posts of the RJ Cooper (DFC) park, which was provided by Cooper's parents after he was killed in action over Derna, Libya in 1941, whilst enlisted in the RAF during World War II. The gate posts show that a total of 34 locals served (probably more than 10% of the total village population) during that conflict. Another four of the Eurongilly population served during the Vietnam War.
