= Clive Caldwell: Air Ace =

2006 Biography of Clive Caldwell by Kristen Alexander

- Author: Kristen Alexander
- Publisher: Allen & Unwin
- Publication date: 2006
- ISBN: 978 1 74114 705 6

Clive Caldwell: Air Ace is a 2006 book by Kristen Alexander. It is a biography of Clive Caldwell, the leading Australian flying ace of World War II.
