= Mitta Mitta, New South Wales =

Mitta Mitta New South Wales
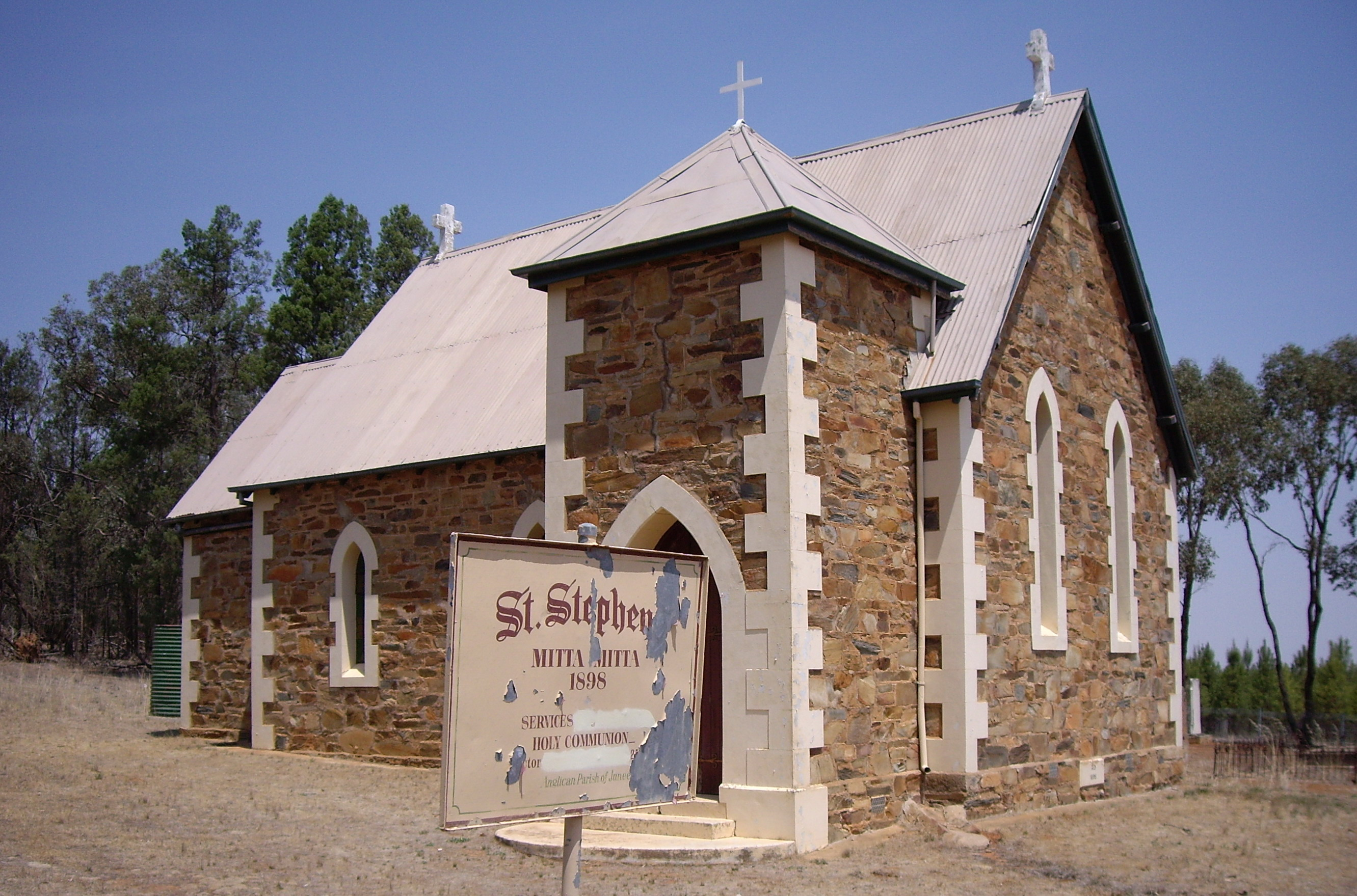
- St Stephen's Anglican Church

- Coordinates: 34°53′S 147°51′E
- Elevation: 303 m (994 ft)
- Location: 21 km (13 mi) from Nangus; 30 km (19 mi) from Bethungra
- LGA(s): Junee Shire
- County: Clarendon
- State electorate(s): Cootamundra

Mitta Mitta is a farming community in the north eastern part of the Riverina. It is situated by road, about 30 kilometres (19 mi) south of Bethungra and 21 kilometres (13 mi) north east of Nangus.

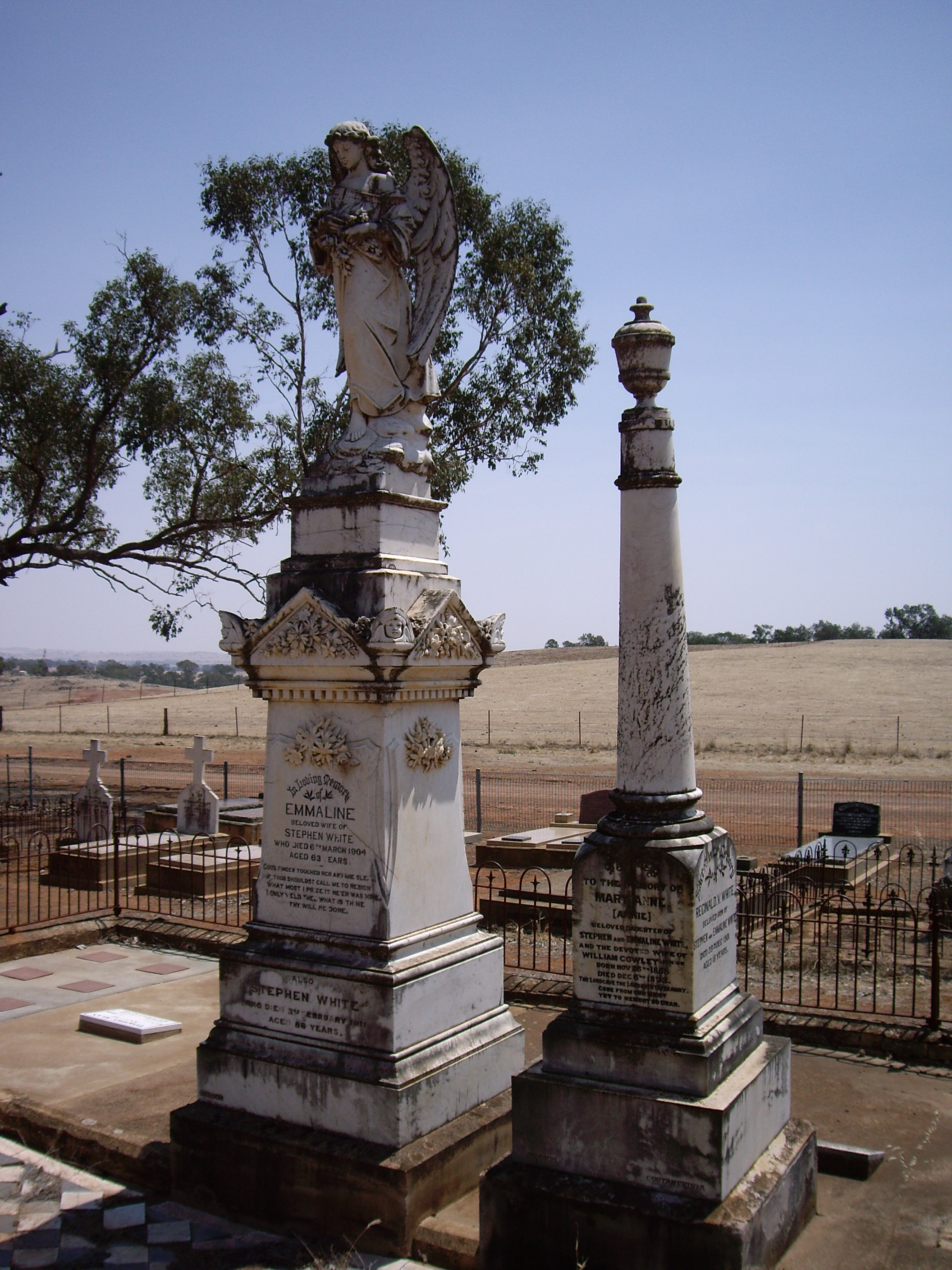
Mitta Mitta Cemetery

Mitta Mitta is locatable only by finding the old St Stephen's Anglican Church situated 8 kilometres (5.0 mi) along a corrugated dirt road that runs west from the Nangus to Bethungra road.

The name Mitta Mitta is derived from the local Aboriginal words "mida-modunga" meaning "where reeds grow".

Mitta Mitta Post Office opened on 1 January 1888, was reduced to a Telephone Office in 1931 and closed in 1936.
