= Dhulura, New South Wales =

Dhulura New South Wales
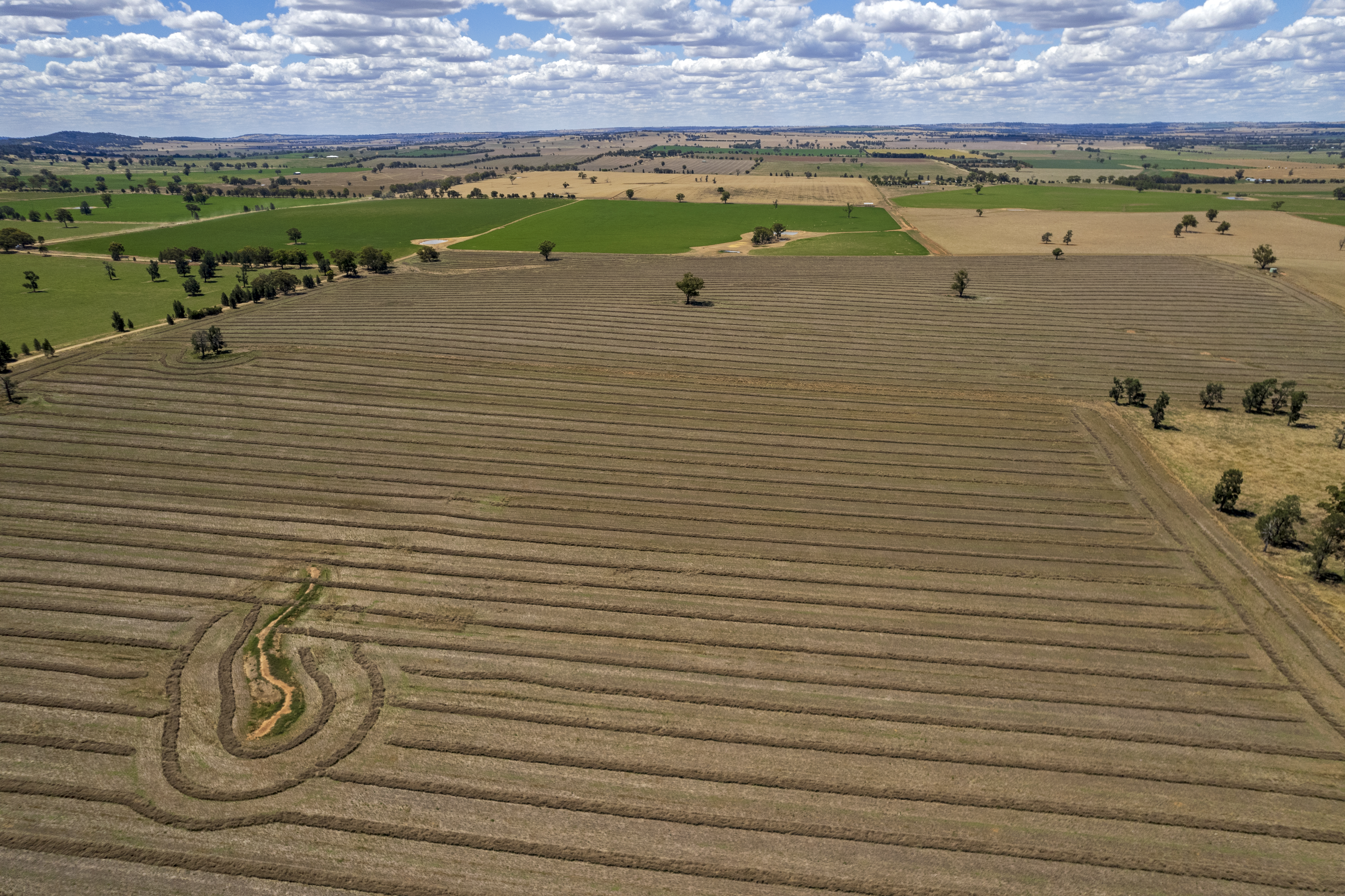
- Aerial view of the rural landscape of Dhulura in December 2021

- Coordinates: 35°00′54″S 147°18′04″E
- Population: 47 (2016 census)
- Postcode(s): 2650
- LGA(s): City of Wagga Wagga
- County: Clarendon
- State electorate(s): Wagga Wagga

Dhulura is a rural area in the New South Wales Riverina close to Wagga Wagga. The locality was gazetted in 2015, and is named after the former Dhulura School which was located in the area
