= Marinna =

Marinna may refer to:

- Myrina (Aeolis), present-day Turkey
- Marinna, New South Wales, Australia
- Marinna Teal or Strings (born 1975), American rapper and songwriter

== See also ==
- Marina (disambiguation)
