= King Charles III Stakes =

King Charles III Stakes may refer to:

- King Charles III Stakes (Australia), a horse race previously named the George Main Stakes
- King Charles III Stakes (Great Britain), a horse race previously named the King's Stand Stakes
