= Nangus, New South Wales =

Nangus
- Town
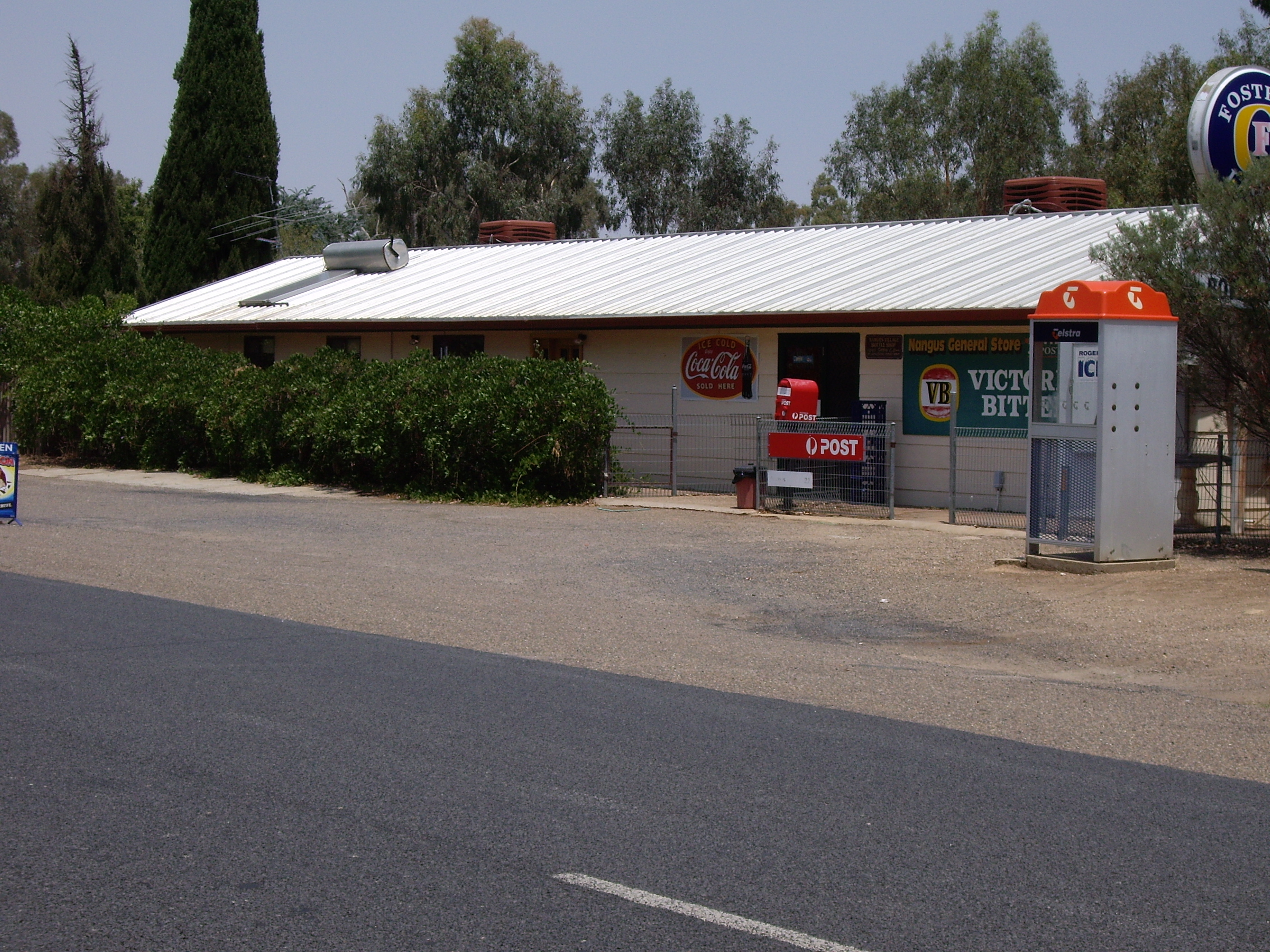
- Nangus General Store

- Coordinates: 35°03′19″S 147°54′25″E
- Country: Australia
- State: New South Wales
- LGA: Gundagai Council
- Location: 20 km (12 mi) from Gundagai; 21 km (13 mi) from Mitta Mitta; 58 km (36 mi) from Wagga Wagga; 397 km (247 mi) from Sydney

Government
  - State electorate: Cootamundra
  - Federal division: Riverina
- Elevation: 220 m (720 ft)

Population
  - Total: 240 (2021 census)
- Postcode: 2722
- County: Clarendon

Nangus is a village on the Wagga Wagga to Gundagai Road on the north side of the Murrumbidgee River. From Nangus, Junee, Gundagai, Wantabadgery, Oura and Wagga Wagga are accessible. Nangus is approximately 24 kilometres (15 mi) due west of Gundagai in the Riverina area of Australia and in Gundagai Council. At the 2021 census, Nangus and the surrounding area had a population of 240. The nearby Nangus Station and Yabtree Station are heritage listed.

Nangus Post Office opened on 1 July 1897.

Nangus has a post office, Anglican church, general store, with an off-site liquor licence, public school, public hall, fire station, petrol station, tennis courts, and hockey fields amongst some of its services and attractions.

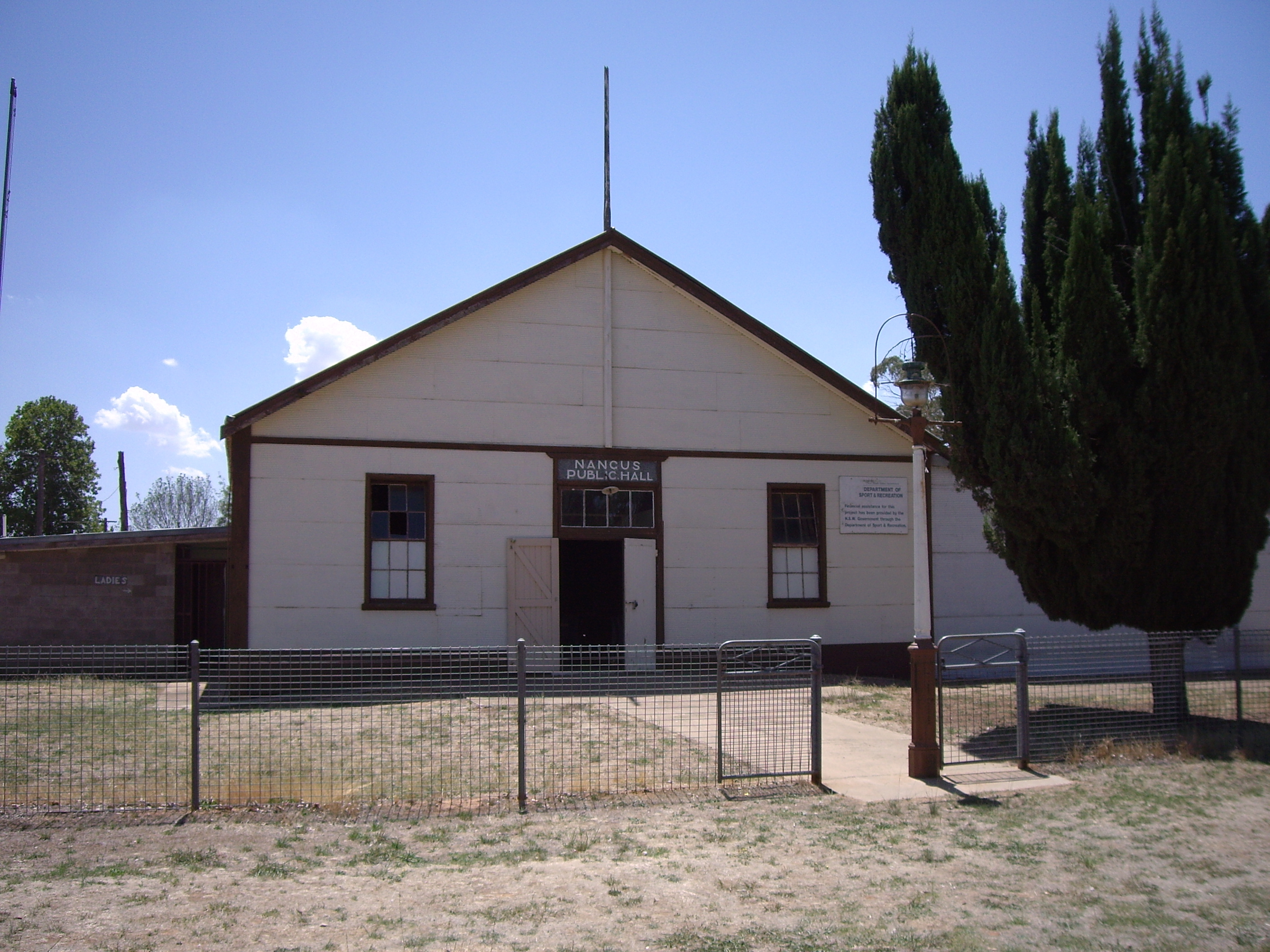
Nangus Public Hall
