= Marinna, New South Wales =

Marinna
- Town
- Coordinates: 34°50′37″S 147°39′02″E
- Country: Australia
- State: New South Wales
- LGA: Junee Shire

Government
  - State electorate: Cootamundra
  - Federal division: Riverina

Population
  - Total: 36 (SAL 2021)
- Time zone: UTC+10 (AEST)
  - Summer (DST): UTC+11 (AEDT)
- Postcode: 2663

Marinna is a locality in Junee Shire in southern New South Wales, Australia. Its main feature is a grain silo on the Main South railway line. A station was opened in the locality between 1897 and 1975.

Marinna Post Office opened on 7 December 1925 and closed in 1968.

== Marinna railway station ==
Preceding station	Former services	Following station
Junee towards Albury	Main Southern Line	Illabo towards Sydney
