= Illabo =

- Town
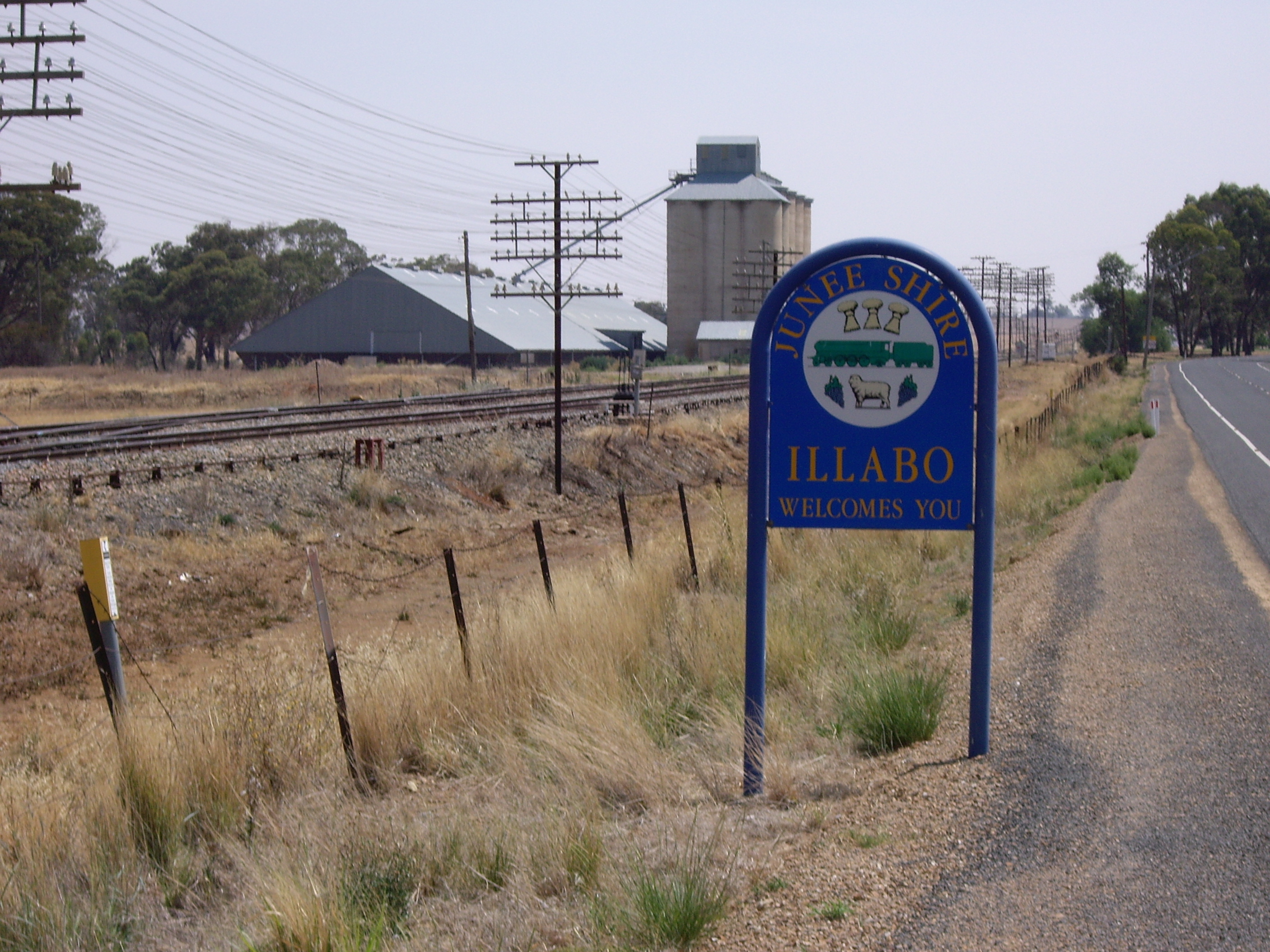
- Entering Illabo

- Coordinates: 34°49′0″S 147°45′0″E
- Country: Australia
- State: New South Wales
- LGA: Junee Shire
- Location: 416 km (258 mi) SW of Sydney; 54 km (34 mi) NE of Wagga Wagga; 17 km (11 mi) E of Junee

Government
  - State electorate: Cootamundra
  - Federal division: Riverina
- Elevation: 279 m (915 ft)

Population
  - Total: 144 (2016 census)
- Postcode: 2590
- County: Clarendon

Illabo (pron. ILL a boh) is a locality in the South West Slopes part of the Riverina in New South Wales, Australia. It is situated about 13 kilometres (8 mi) southwest of Bethungra and 16 kilometres (10 mi) northeast of Junee. At the 2016 census, Illabo had a population of 144.

== History ==
Illabo Post Office opened on 1 July 1879. A railway station on the Main South railway served the town between 1878 and the 1970s. A grain silo remains in use. The town name is said to derive from an Aboriginal word meaning "where", but other sources derive it as a clipping of billabong.

== Noted residents ==
- George Main, a chairman of the Australian Jockey Club, and his wife Mary had a grazing property "Retreat", at Illabo, where they bred racehorses and ran sheep. The George Main Stakes was named for him.
- Their daughter Jean Main married Clive Caldwell in 1940 and lived in Illabo for several years after Caldwell became one of Australia's leading fighter aces of WWII and was known as "Killer Caldwell", a household name throughout Australia.
- Hugh Main, George's brother, also a horse breeder but much better known as the local MLA 1920–1938, had an adjacent property, part of "Retreat", and has been referred to as "Retreat East", roughly equidistant from Bethungra.

== Notes and references ==
Preceding station	Former services	Following station
Marinna towards Albury	Main Southern Line	Bethungra towards Sydney
