= Oura, New South Wales =

Oura New South Wales
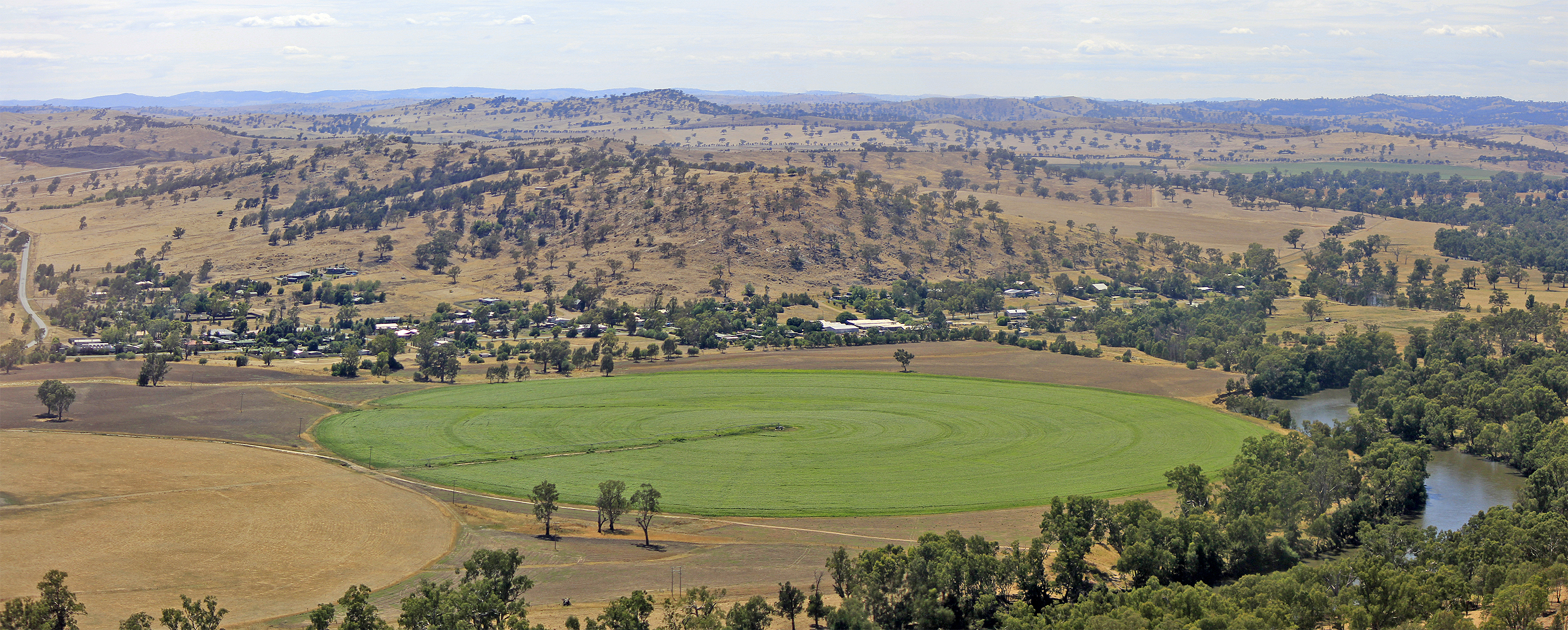
- Aerial view of Oura

- Coordinates: 35°5′56″S 147°35′53″E
- Population: 246 (2021 census)
- Established: 226
- Postcode(s): 2650
- Location: 15 km (9 mi) from Wagga Wagga; 20 km (12 mi) from Wantabadgery
- LGA(s): City of Wagga Wagga
- County: Clarendon
- Parish: Oura
- State electorate(s): Wagga Wagga
- Federal division(s): Riverina

Oura is a town community in the central east part of the Riverina and situated about 15 kilometres north east from Wagga Wagga and 20 kilometres south west from Wantabadgery. At the 2021 census, Oura had a population of 246 people.

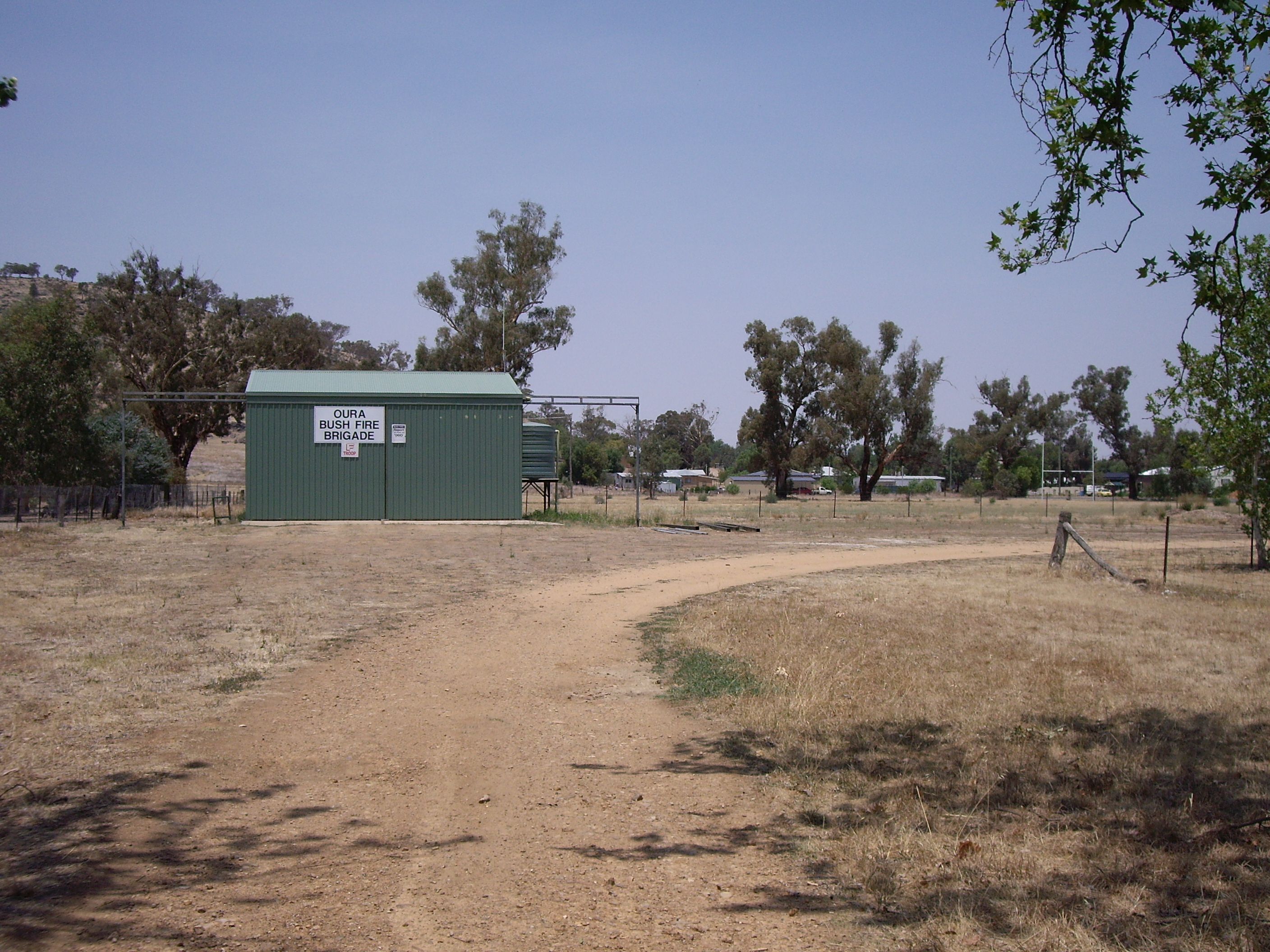
Oura - with Bush Fire Brigade shed

== Former residents ==
- Leslie Redgrave (1882–1956) Writer, headmaster and grazier
