= Brawlin =

- Town
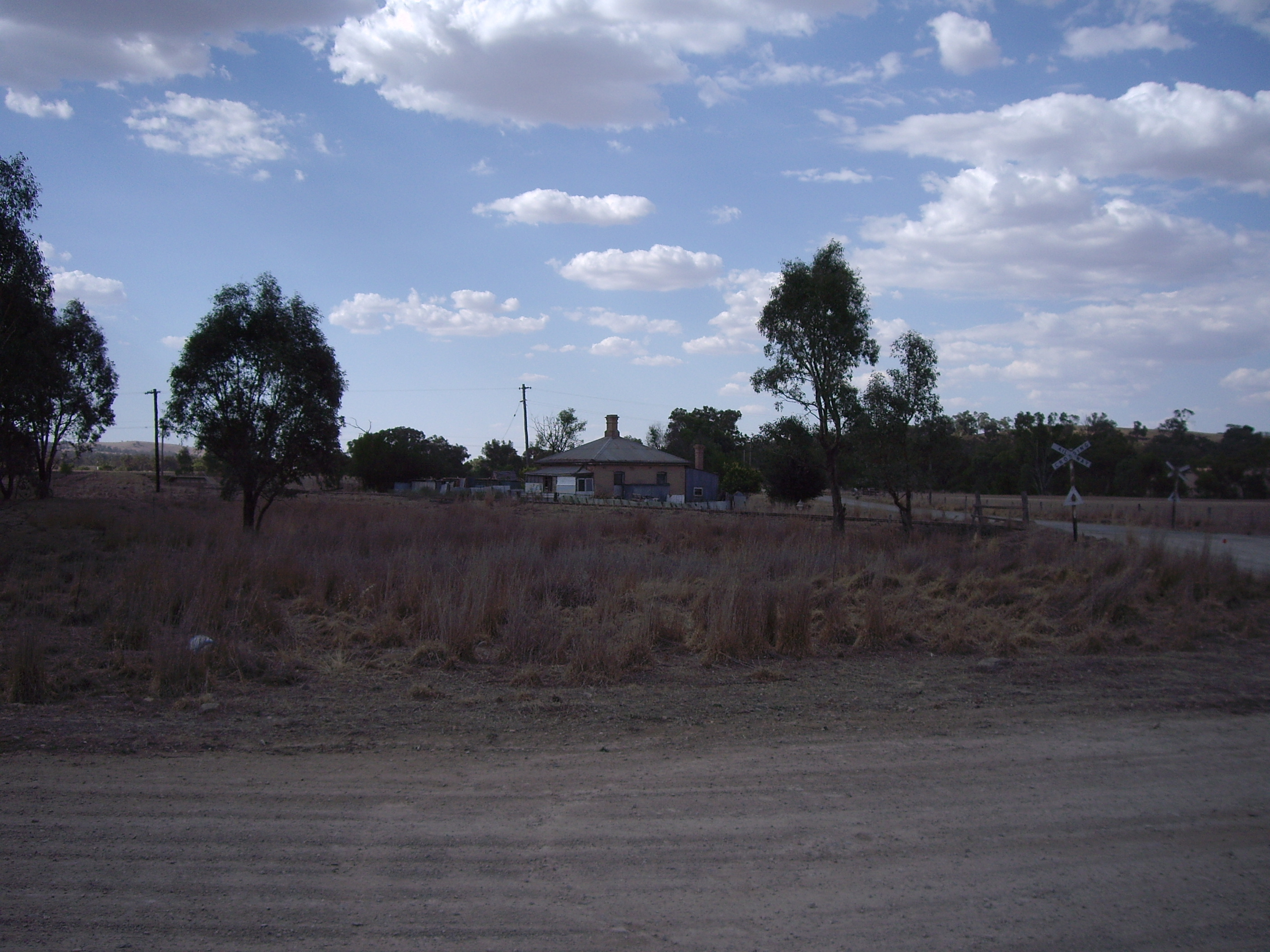
- Brawlin – with disused rail siding at left background

- Coordinates: 34°44′0″S 148°02′0″E
- Country: Australia
- State: New South Wales
- LGA: Gundagai Council
- Location: 362 km (225 mi) from Sydney; 110 km (68 mi) from Wagga Wagga; 29 km (18 mi) from Coolac; 12 km (7.5 mi) from Cootamundra

Government
  - State electorate: Cootamundra
  - Federal division: Riverina
- Elevation: 295 m (968 ft)
- Postcode: No postcode
- County: Harden

Brawlin is a small community in the northeast of the Riverina, about 12 kilometres south of Cootamundra and 29 kilometres north of Coolac.

Brawlin Post Office opened on 1 February 1880 and closed in 1951.

Brawlin is the site of a railway siding used to unload and upload goods, but that siding is no longer in operation. Brawlin is only found by taking the Brawlin to Lockhart dirt road that runs west off the Coolac to Cootamundra road.
