= Cootamundra–Gundagai Regional Council =

- Local government area
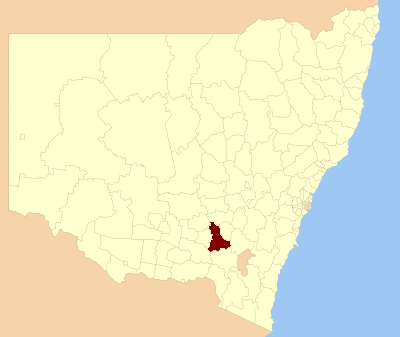
- Location in New South Wales

- Interactive map of Cootamundra–Gundagai Regional Council
- Coordinates: 34°48′S 148°7′E
- Country: Australia
- State: New South Wales
- Region: Riverina
- Established: 12 May 2016
- Council seat: Cootamundra and Gundagai

Government
  - Mayor: Charlie Sheahan
  - State electorate: Cootamundra
  - Federal division: Riverina

Area
  - Total: 3,981 km^{2} (1,537 sq mi)

Population
  - Totals: 11,141 (2016); 11,260 (2018 est.)
  - Density: 2.7985/km^{2} (7.2482/sq mi)
- Website: Cootamundra–Gundagai Regional Council
LGAs around Cootamundra–Gundagai Regional Council
Temora	Hilltops	Hilltops
Junee	Cootamundra–Gundagai Regional Council	Hilltops
Wagga Wagga	Snowy Valleys	Yass Valley

Cootamundra–Gundagai Regional Council (CGRC) is a local government area located in the Riverina region of New South Wales, Australia. The council was formed on 12 May 2016 through a merger of the Cootamundra Shire and Gundagai Shire Councils. Originally named Gundagai Council, the name was changed to Cootamundra–Gundagai Regional Council on 7 September 2016.

The council has an area of 3,981 square kilometres (1,537 sq mi) and occupies the slopes of the western side of the Great Dividing Range between Yass and Tumut and to the north the beginning of the northern part of the Riverina plains. At the time of its establishment the council had an estimated population of 11,141.

The first mayor of the Cootamundra–Gundagai Regional Council was Councillor Abb McAlister, who was elected after the inaugural Cootamundra–Gundagai Regional Council election which was held on 9 September 2017.

The second and current mayor of the Cootamundra–Gundagai Regional Council is Councillor Charlie Sheahan, who was elected after the NSW Local Government Election which was held on 4 December 2021.

== History ==
=== Controversy at creation ===
Around the same time as the state government was announcing the mergers of shires and councils in a 2015 review to amalgamate 44 local government areas to form 19 new local government areas, the mayor of the former Gundagai Shire, Abb McAlister, lodged papers with the Land and Environment Court of New South Wales to prevent it.

Signs protesting the amalgamation were prominently displayed throughout Gundagai for several years.

In July 2025, the local government minister Ron Hoenig announced that the council would become two separate entities as it was before 2016.

== Towns and localities ==
The following towns and localities are located within Cootamundra-Gundagai Council:

- Brawlin
- Coolac
- Cootamundra
- Frampton
- Gundagai
- Mount Adrah
- Muttama
- Nangus
- Stockinbingal
- Tumblong
- Wallendbeen

== Population ==
The population for the predecessor councils was estimated in 2015 as:

- 7,705 in Cootamundra Shire and
- 3,756 in Gundagai Shire.

== Council ==
The CGRC consists of nine Councillors elected proportionally in a single ward.

The inaugural councillors were expected to be elected for a fixed four-year term of office by the Local Government Elections held on 9 September 2017. Due to the COVID-19 pandemic, the councillors served a slightly longer term as the elections were postponed to 4 December 2021.

The second council was elected on 4 December 2021, with the final results declared on 20 December 2021. These councillors was sworn in at an extraordinary meeting held on 10 January 2022 and will serve for 2 years and 3/4 to realign the election calendar to the original plan. The next election will take place in September of 2024.

The most recent election was held on 4 December 2021, and the makeup of the council is as follows:

Party	Councillors
Independents and unaligned	9
Total	9

Councillor	Party	Notes
Abb McAlister	Independent	Former mayor and returning councillor
Charlie Sheahan	Independent	Mayor, returning councillor
Gil Kelly	Independent	Returning councillor
Les Boyd	Independent	
Leigh Bowden	Independent	Deputy Mayor, returning councillor
Penny Nicholson	Independent	Returning councillor
Logan Collins	Independent National	
Trevor Glover	Independent	
David Graham	Independent	Returning councillor

== Election results ==
=== 2024 ===
Cootamundra–Gundagai Regional Council is composed of nine councillors elected proportionally to a single ward.

=== 2021 ===
Cootamundra–Gundagai Regional Council is composed of nine councillors elected proportionally to a single ward.

Logan Collins was elected at the age of 18, becoming the youngest local councillor in New South Wales history.

== Past councillors ==
=== 2017−present ===
Year	Councillor	Councillor	Councillor	Councillor	Councillor	Councillor	Councillor	Councillor	Councillor
2017	Doug Phillips (Ind.)	Abb McAlister (Ind.)	Dennis Palmer (Ind.)	Craig "Stewie" Stewart (Ind.)	Charlie Sheahan (Ind. Labor)	Gil Kelly (Ind.)	David Graham (Ind.)	Penny Nicholson (Ind.)	Leigh Bowden (Ind.)
2021	Les Boyd (Ind.)	Abb McAlister (Ind.)	Logan Collins (Ind. Nat)	Trevor Glover (Ind.)	Charlie Sheahan (Ind. Labor)	Gil Kelly (Ind.)	David Graham (Ind.)	Penny Nicholson (Ind.)	Leigh Bowden (Ind.)

== See also ==
- Local government areas of New South Wales
