= George Main (horse racing) =

Australian pastoralist and horse breeder

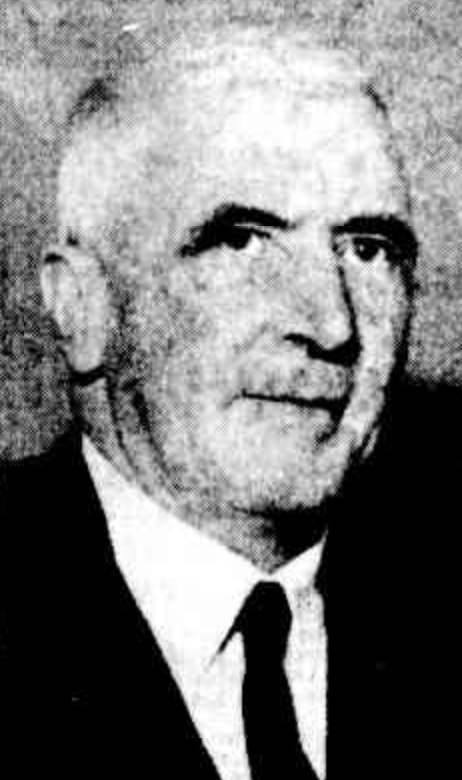
George Main, 1937

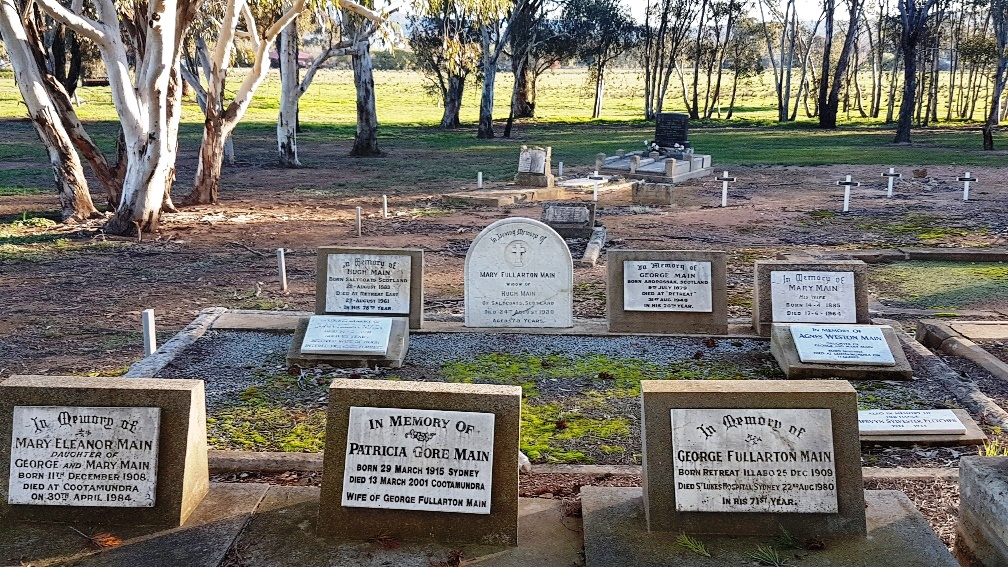
Main family plot, Cootamundra cemetery

George Main (9 July 1879 – 31 August 1948) was an Australian pastoralist and horse breeder, chairman of the Australian Jockey Club (AJC) —later Australian Turf Club— from 1937 to 1945.

== History ==
Main was born in Ardrossan, Scotland, the eldest son of Hugh Main (c. 1831 – 9 August 1885) of Saltcoats, Ayrshire, and educated at Troubridge School, where he was a member of the cadet corps, and shot at Bisley.

He and his brother Hugh were brought out to South Australia by their father in 1884, and had a home "Lisnamorra", Medindie.

Both were educated at Roseworthy Agricultural College.

In 1900 George enlisted in the Bushmen's Contingent, a South Australian volunteer force mobilised to fight in the Boer War. He enlisted with the 7th Contingent in January 1902, at which time he was resident at Victor Harbor.

Their father had two blocks on Kermode Street, North Adelaide, in partnership with Nathaniel Alexander Knox (died 1908) with five two-storey houses, all tenanted. He also owned a city block on the corner of Hurtle Square and Hanson Street with two shops and six houses. These properties were advertised for sale by auction in August 1908, around the time the brothers made the move to Illabo, New South Wales.

The two men established the pastoral property "Retreat" at East Illabo or Bethungra, New South Wales, 12 miles (19 km) south west of Cootamundra, around 1906. Hugh enlisted with the 1st AIF and served in France during WWI, while George managed the property. Pte. Hugh Main returned in 1919; his part of the property was often called "Retreat East".

George Main was a successful horse breeder and studmaster. Notable stallions were Featherstitch (1905–1923) by Ayrshire, and Limelight. Featherstitch, whom he purchased in 1909, was imported 1907 by James N. Hart (died 1920), and won the 1909 Tattersall's Stakes at Randwick, and was the sire of many good horses. Main raced several of his own horses, but unsuccessfully.

He married Mary "Polly" Weston of Kadlinga Station at Mintaro, South Australia on 3 March 1908, and settled down at "Retreat". Their children included Jean Main, who married Clive Caldwell on 13 April 1940. Caldwell would later rise to fame (and a little infamy) as an "ace" RAAF fighter pilot.

Main was elected a member of the AJC in 1911 and elected to the committee in September 1921. He acted as temporary Chairman during the final illness of Sir Colin Stephen, and was elected to the position on 16 September 1937, resigning in November 1945, to be succeeded by A. G. Potter.

He died at "Retreat" on 31 August 1948 and his remains were buried at the Cootamundra Cemetery. He was survived by his wife Mary, sons George and Hugh, and daughters Molly and Agnes "Toots" Main, and Jean Caldwell. His estate was valued at £32,036 for probate purposes.
