= Clive Caldwell =

Australian flying ace (1911–1994)

Clive Robertson Caldwell
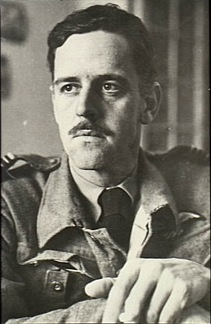
- Clive Caldwell c. 1942
- Born: 28 July 1911; Lewisham, New South Wales
- Died: 5 August 1994 (aged 83); Sydney
- Military career
- Allegiance: Australia
- Branch: Royal Australian Air Force
- Service years: 1940–1946
- Rank: Flight Lieutenant (formerly Group Captain)
- Nickname: "Killer"
- Commands: No. 112 Squadron RAF (1942); No. 1 Wing RAAF (1942–1943); No. 80 Wing RAAF (1944–1945)
- Conflicts: World War II; North African campaign; Syria-Lebanon campaign; South West Pacific theatre; New Guinea campaign
- Awards: Distinguished Service Order; Distinguished Flying Cross & Bar; Krzyż Walecznych (Poland)

Clive Robertson Caldwell, DSO, DFC & Bar (28 July 1911 – 5 August 1994) was the leading Australian air ace of World War II. He is officially credited with shooting down 28.5 enemy aircraft in over 300 operational sorties, including a German ace in a day, Erbo Graf von Kageneck. In addition to his official score, he has been ascribed six probables and 15 damaged. (Note: According to the USAF historian, Major Robert Tate, Caldwell's career claims can be corroborated 50% to 60%, indicating that some of his claims may not have actually been aerial victories. Tate found similar corroboration rates for other pilots during the same period: Billy Drake (70% to 80% corroboration), Hans-Joachim Marseille (65% to 70% corroboration), John Lloyd Waddy (70% to 80% corroboration) and Nicky Barr (60% to 70% corroboration))

Caldwell flew Curtiss P-40 Tomahawks and Kittyhawks in the North African Campaign and Supermarine Spitfires in the South West Pacific Theatre. He was the highest-scoring P-40 pilot from any air force and the highest-scoring Allied pilot in North Africa.

Caldwell also commanded a Royal Air Force (RAF) squadron and two Royal Australian Air Force (RAAF) wings. His military service ended in controversy, when he resigned in protest at the misuse of Australian First Tactical Air Force's fighter units and was later court martialed and convicted for trading liquor.

== Early life ==
Caldwell was born in the Sydney suburb of Lewisham, and educated at Albion Park School, Sydney Grammar School and Trinity Grammar School. He was at Sydney Grammar School from June 1924 until May 1927, but did not complete his Leaving Certificate there. He rowed in the 4th IV and was a member of the Games Committee. In 1938, he learned to fly with the Royal Aero Club of New South Wales. to July 1912.

He was employed as a commission agent when World War II broke out, and he joined the Citizen Air Force division of the Royal Australian Air Force (RAAF) on 27 May 1940, with the intention of becoming a fighter pilot. As he was over the age limit for fighter training, Caldwell persuaded a pharmacist friend to alter the details on his birth certificate to July 1912. He was accepted by the RAAF and joined the Empire Air Training Scheme (EATS) also known as the British Commonwealth Air Training Plan and similar names.

== World War II ==
=== Middle East and North Africa ===
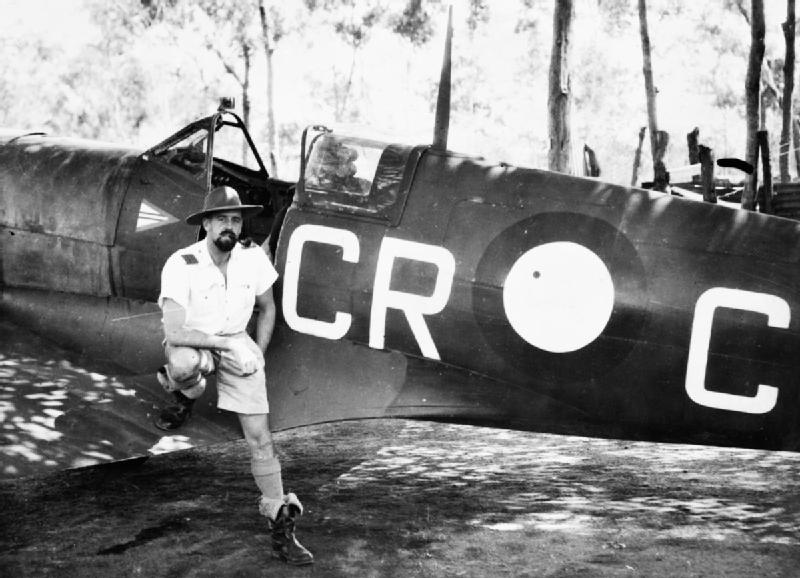
Caldwell posing beside his Supermarine Spitfire.

Caldwell's first, brief combat posting was a British Hurricane unit, No. 73 Squadron, Royal Air Force, in the early stages of the North African campaign. He had gained only a few operational hours when he was transferred to No. 250 Squadron RAF as it converted to the new P-40 Tomahawk, one of the first units in the world to operate P-40s.

According to some accounts, on 6 June 1941, Caldwell as Flying Officer Jack Hamlyn's wingman, was involved in the P-40's first ever kill, of an Italian CANT Z.1007 bomber, over Egypt. However, the claim was not officially recognised. Hamlyn and Sergeant Tom Paxton scored the first official kill two days later, another Italian CANT bomber. Soon afterwards, Caldwell served with the squadron over Syria and Lebanon.

After struggling to acquire the skill of gunnery deflection, Caldwell developed a training technique, known as "shadow shooting", in which he fired at the shadow of his own aircraft on the desert surface. This was later widely adopted by the Desert Air Force.

The squadron returned to North Africa. On 26 June 1941, while escorting bombers attacking Gazala, Libya, Caldwell destroyed an aircraft in air-to-air combat for the first time, during his 30th sortie. He downed a German Messerschmitt Bf 109E, piloted by Leutnant Heinz Schmidt of I. Gruppe, Jagdgeschwader 27 Afrika (JG 27—Fighter Wing 27), over Capuzzo, he followed this claim with a 'half share' of a Messerschmitt Bf 110 of III./ZG 26 Horst Wessel and 2 Ju 87s of II./Sturzkampfgeschwader 2 Immelmann (StG 2—Dive Bomber Wing 2) on 30 June.

On 4 July 1941, Caldwell saw a German pilot shoot and kill a close friend, Pilot Officer Donald Munro, who was descending to the ground in a parachute. This was a war crime, but was nevertheless common among German and Allied pilots. One biographer, Kristin Alexander, suggests that it may have caused Caldwell's attitude to harden significantly. Months later, press officers and journalists popularised Caldwell's nickname of "Killer", which he disliked. One reason for the nickname was that he too shot enemy airmen after they parachuted out of aircraft.

Caldwell commented many years later: "... there was no blood lust or anything about it like that. It was just a matter of not wanting them back to have another go at us. I never shot any who landed where they could be taken prisoner." (In later life, Caldwell said that his thoughts often turned to one Japanese airman or passenger, who survived Caldwell's last aerial victory but could not be rescued.)

A more commonly cited reason for the nickname was his habit of using up ammunition left over at the end of sorties, to shoot up enemy troop convoys and vehicles. During his war service, Caldwell wrote in a notebook: "it's your life or theirs. This is war."

On 29 August 1941, while flying to his base alone, over northwest Egypt, Caldwell was attacked by two Bf 109s, in a simultaneous approach at right angles. His attackers included one of Germany's most famous aces, Leutnant Werner Schröer, also of JG 27, in a Bf 109E-7. Caldwell sustained three separate wounds from ammunition fragments and or shrapnel. His Tomahawk was hit by more than 100 7.92 mm bullets and five 20 mm cannon shells, but he shot down Schröer's wingman, and heavily damaged Schröer's "Black 8", causing Schröer to disengage. Suitable claim for that day 29.08.41 Ltn. Werner Schroer (6.) of 1./JG 27, Curtiss P-40 N.W. Sidi Barrani at 18.10 (Film C. 2036/II Nr.81357/42).

On 23 November, Caldwell shot down an Experte, Hauptmann Wolfgang Lippert, Gruppenkommandeur (Group Commander) of II./JG 27, who bailed out. Lippert had struck the stabiliser. Following capture he had his legs amputated. 10 days later, a gangrene infection set in and he died on 3 December. For this action, Caldwell was awarded the Distinguished Flying Cross. Caldwell claimed five Junkers Ju 87 (Stuka) dive bombers in a matter of minutes on 5 December. For this he was awarded a Bar to his DFC. His report of that action reads:

I received radio warning that a large enemy formation was approaching from the North-West. No. 250 Squadron went into line astern behind me and as No. 112 Squadron engaged the escorting enemy fighters we attacked the JUs from the rear quarter. At 300 yards I opened fire with all my guns at the leader of one of the rear sections of three, allowing too little deflection, and hit No. 2 and No. 3, one of which burst into flames immediately, the other going down smoking and went into flames after losing about 1000 feet. I then attacked the leader of the rear section...from below and behind, opening fire with all guns at very close range. The enemy aircraft turned over and dived steeply... opened fire [at another Ju 87] again at close range, the enemy caught fire...and crashed in flames. I was able to pull up under the belly of one of the rear, holding the burst until very close range. The enemy... caught fire and dived into the ground.

The citations for both the original DFC and the Bar were published in the same issue of the London Gazette, a supplement to that of 23 December 1941, dated 26 December 1941. The first citation described Caldwell as continuing to "take his toll of enemy aircraft" and that "he personally shot down 5 of the enemy's aircraft bringing his total victories to 12." The second said that he "has performed splendid work in the Middle East operations", "shown dogged determination and high devotion to duty which have proved an inspiration to his fellow pilots", and that after receiving "wounds on his face, arms and legs...he courageously returned to the attack and shot down one of the hostile aircraft." Michael Balss, in his book Deutsche Luftwaffe Losses & Claims, notes the discrepancy between the claim by 112 Squadron of five Ju 87 destroyed when the Luftwaffe lost only one, with two killed from I./StG 3, and a second of I./StG 1 being severely damaged (50%) with crew unhurt, both at Gubi.

On 24 December 1941, Caldwell was involved in an engagement which mortally wounded another Luftwaffe ace, Hpt. Erbo Graf von Kageneck (credited with 69 air victories) of III./JG 27. Caldwell only claimed a "damaged" at the time, but postwar sources have attributed him with the kill. (Note: Kageneck's brother and biographer, August von Kageneck, who later corresponded with Caldwell, was among those who held this theory.)

In January 1942, Caldwell was promoted to squadron leader and given command of No. 112 Squadron RAF, becoming the first EATS graduate to command a British squadron. 112 Sqn at that time included several Polish aviators, and this was why Caldwell was later awarded the Polish Krzyż Walecznych (KW; "Cross of Valour").

In February 1942, Caldwell scored another striking victory, while leading a formation of 11 Kittyhawks from 112 Sqn and 3 Sqn. Over Gazala, he sighted a schwarm of Bf 109Fs flying some 2,000 ft higher. Caldwell immediately nosed into a shallow dive, applied maximum power and boost, then pulled his Kittyhawk up into a vertical climb. With his P-40 "hanging from its propeller," he fired a burst at a Bf 109 flown by Leutnant Hans-Arnold Stahlschmidt of I./JG 27, who was lagging behind the others. Stahlschmidt's fighter "shuddered like a carpet being whacked with a beater" before spinning out of control. Although the Kittyhawk pilots thought that the Bf 109 had crashed inside Allied lines, Stahlschmidt was able to crash-land in friendly territory.

When Caldwell left the theatre later in 1942, the commander of air operations in North Africa and the Middle East, Air Vice Marshal Arthur Tedder described him as: "[a]n excellent leader and a first class shot". Caldwell claimed 22 victories while in North Africa flying P-40s, including ten Bf 109s and two Macchi C.202s. He had flown some 550 hours in over 300 operational sorties.

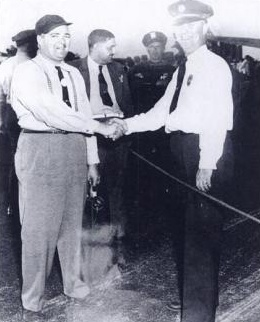
Test Pilot Herbert O. Fisher shakes hands with Curtiss-Wright fire chief; note Caldwell in background, August 1942.

While on a tour of the United States, Caldwell visited Curtiss-Wright in Buffalo, New York. On 6 August 1942, he was invited to come on an acceptance re-flight of a Curtiss C-46 Commando, the latest transport aircraft destined for overseas use. The aircraft was also loaded with Curtiss executives, and flown by Chief Production Test Pilot Herbert O. Fisher. The landing gear became stuck in a three-quarters down position, and after an extended eight-hour attempt to release the gear, Fisher calmly belly-landed the C-46.

With the weight of the aircraft gently pushing the gear back into the wheel wells, a minimum of damage resulted. Caldwell had taken over as the co-pilot on the eight hours of circling over Buffalo, receiving certification that he was checked out on the C-46, under the tutelage of Fisher. Finishing his tour at Curtiss-Wright, Caldwell visited the North American Aviation factory and was able to personally evaluate their new P-51 fighter, then in development.

=== South West Pacific ===
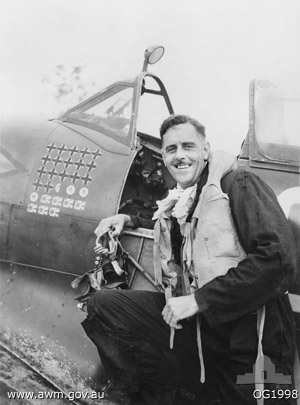
Caldwell with his Spitfire on Morotai, in December 1944

In 1942, Australia came under increasing pressure from Japanese forces, and Caldwell was recalled by the RAAF, to serve as the wing leader of No. 1 (Fighter) Wing, comprising No. 54 Squadron RAF, No. 452 Squadron RAAF and No. 457 Squadron RAAF. The wing was equipped with the Supermarine Spitfire. In early 1943, it was posted to Darwin, to defend it against Japanese air raids.

Caldwell claimed two kills in his first interception sortie over Darwin, a Mitsubishi A6M Zero (also known by the Allied codename "Zeke") fighter and a Nakajima B5N "Kate" light bomber. The Spitfire pilots found Japanese fighter pilots reluctant to engage Allied fighters over Australia, due to the distance from their bases in the Dutch East Indies. The wing initially suffered high losses, due to the inexperience of many of its pilots, and teething mechanical problems with their newly "tropicalised" Mark VC Spitfires. This was viewed with concern by high commanders, to such extent that the Allied air commander in the South West Pacific, Major General George Kenney, considered sending the wing to the New Guinea campaign, and returning US Fifth Air Force fighter units to Darwin.

On 17 August 1943, Caldwell scored his last aerial victory, a Mitsubishi Ki-46 "Dinah" of the 202nd Sentai, over the Arafura Sea. He claimed a total of 6.5 Japanese aircraft shot down.

Later in 1943, Caldwell was posted to Mildura, to command No. 2 Operational Training Unit (2OTU). In November 1943, he was awarded the Distinguished Service Order (DSO). In 1944, with the Japanese forces retreating north, Caldwell was again posted to Darwin, this time commanding No. 80 (Fighter) Wing, equipped with the Spitfire Mark VIII.

In April 1945, while serving at Morotai in the Dutch East Indies with the Australian First Tactical Air Force, as Officer Commanding No. 80 Wing, Caldwell played a leading part in the "Morotai Mutiny", in which several senior flyers resigned in protest at what they saw as the relegation of RAAF fighter squadrons to dangerous and strategically worthless ground attack missions. An investigation resulted in three senior officers being relieved of their commands, with Caldwell and the other "mutineers" cleared.

Prior to the "mutiny", Caldwell had been charged over his involvement in an alcohol racket on Morotai, where liquor was flown in by RAAF aircraft and then sold to the sizeable US forces contingent in the locality. He was court martialled in January 1946 and reduced to the rank of Flight Lieutenant. Caldwell left the service in February.

== Personal life ==
On 13 April 1940, Caldwell married Jean McIver Main, whom he had known twelve years, a daughter of George and Mary Main of "Retreat" station, Illabo, New South Wales. George was well known as chairman of the Australian Jockey Club. A pre-wedding reception was held at Cootamundra. The service was held at the tiny chapel at Dirnaseer, adjacent "Retreat". On his return to Australia, the couple lived in Illabo until at least 1947.

== Later years ==
After the war, Caldwell was involved as a purchasing agent obtaining surplus aircraft and other military equipment from the US Foreign Liquidation Commission in the Philippines. The aircraft and equipment were exported to Australia in 1946. After the successful conclusion of this venture, Caldwell joined a cloth import/export company in Sydney and shortly after became its managing director. He became a partner in 1953 and later served as chairman of the board. The firm, Clive Caldwell (Sales) Pty Ltd, achieved considerable success under Caldwell's direction and expanded through subsidiaries worldwide.

Although in later life Caldwell "spoke modestly" about his wartime service, upon his death in Sydney on 5 August 1994, many Australians "mourned the passing of a true national hero".

== Honours and awards ==

- Distinguished Service Order (DSO) – awarded 14 October 1943
- Distinguished Flying Cross and Bar (DFC*) – both awarded 26 December 1941
- 1939–1945 Star – campaign medal
- Air Crew Europe Star – campaign medal
- Africa Star with "North Africa 1942–43" Clasp – campaign medal
- Pacific Star
- Defence Medal
- War Medal 1939–1945 – campaign medal
- Australia Service Medal 1939–45 – campaign medal
- Polish Cross of Valour (Krzyż Walecznych) – permission to wear granted 2 August 1942

== See also ==
- List of World War II aces from Australia
