= Wantabadgery =

Wantabadgery New South Wales
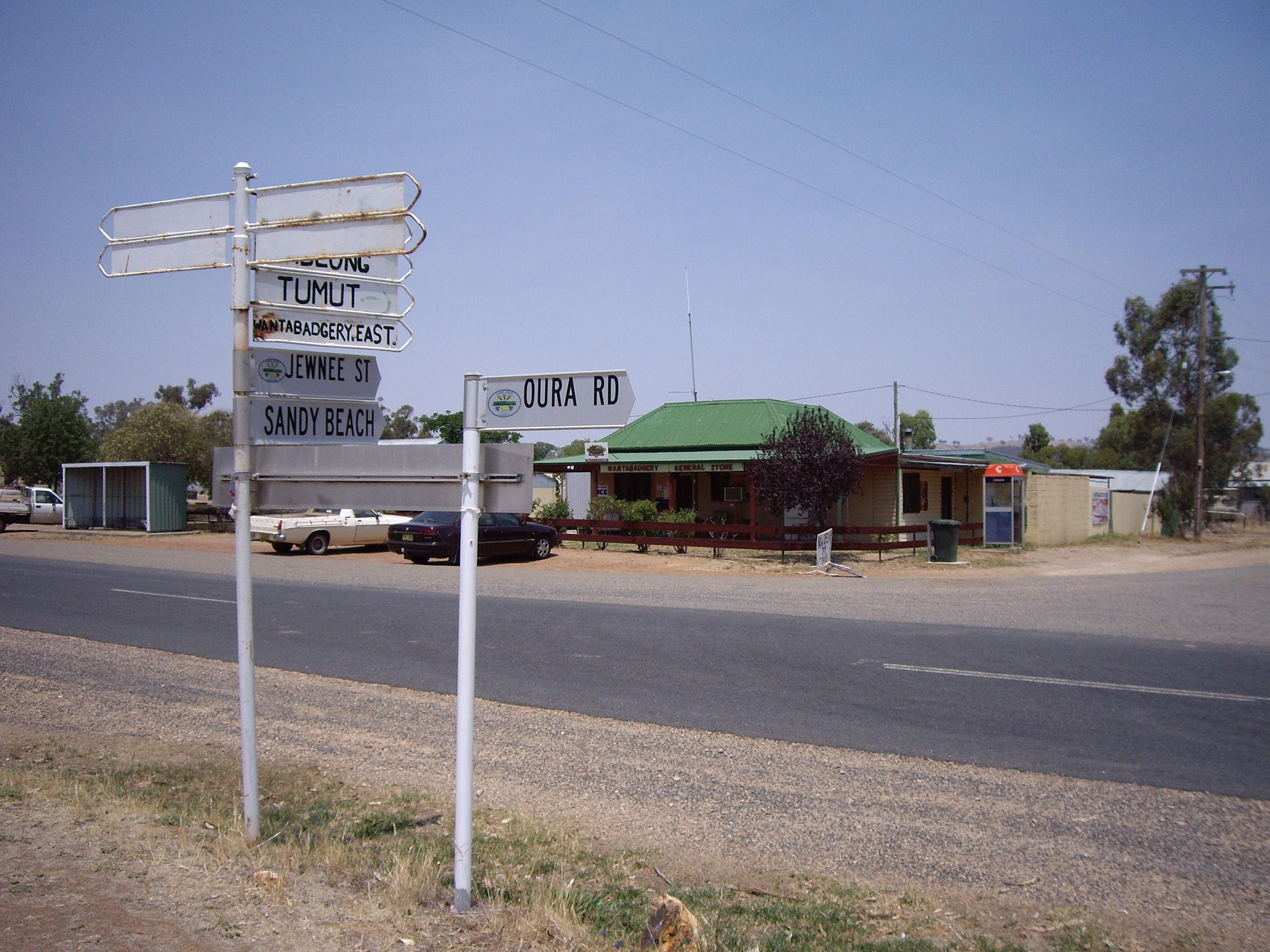
- Wantabadgery - in the Junee Shire note street sign with old spelling of Jewnee - see Junee

- Coordinates: 35°02′31″S 147°45′10″E
- Population: 183 (2021 census)
- Postcode(s): 2650
- Elevation: 302 m (991 ft)
- Location: 19 km (12 mi) from Nangus; 35 km (22 mi) from Wagga Wagga
- LGA(s): Junee Shire
- County: Clarendon
- State electorate(s): Cootamundra
- Federal division(s): Riverina

Wantabadgery is a village community in the central eastern part of the Riverina situated about 35 kilometres east of Wagga Wagga and 19 kilometres west of Nangus. At the 2021 census, Wantabadgery had a population of 183.

Wanta Badgery Post Office opened on 1 December 1923 and closed in 1966.

Wantabadgery was formerly an Aboriginal mission. It is now a small village along the Murrumbidgee River, New South Wales.

== Gallery ==
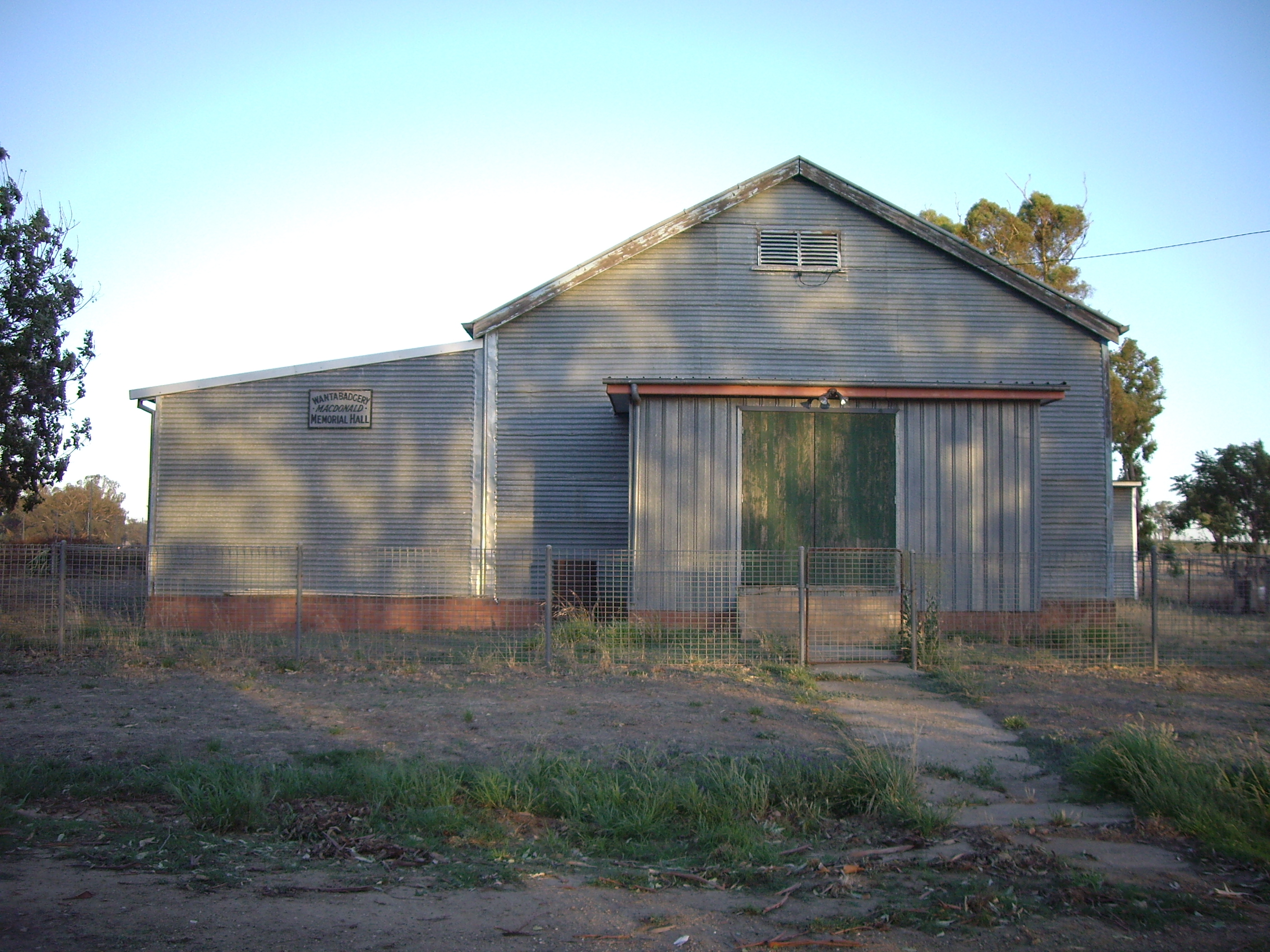
MacDonald Memorial Hall
