= Clarendon County, New South Wales =

Clarendon New South Wales
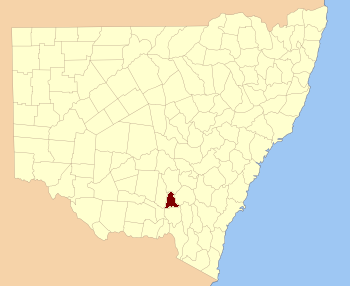
- Location in New South Wales
Lands administrative divisions around Clarendon:
Bourke	Bland	Bland
Bourke	Clarendon	Harden
Mitchell	Wynyard	Buccleuch

Clarendon County is one of the 141 cadastral divisions of New South Wales. It contains the towns of Gundagai, Junee and Bethungra. The Murrumbidgee River is the boundary to the south.

Clarendon County was named in honour of George William Frederick Villiers, 4th Earl Clarendon (1800–1870).

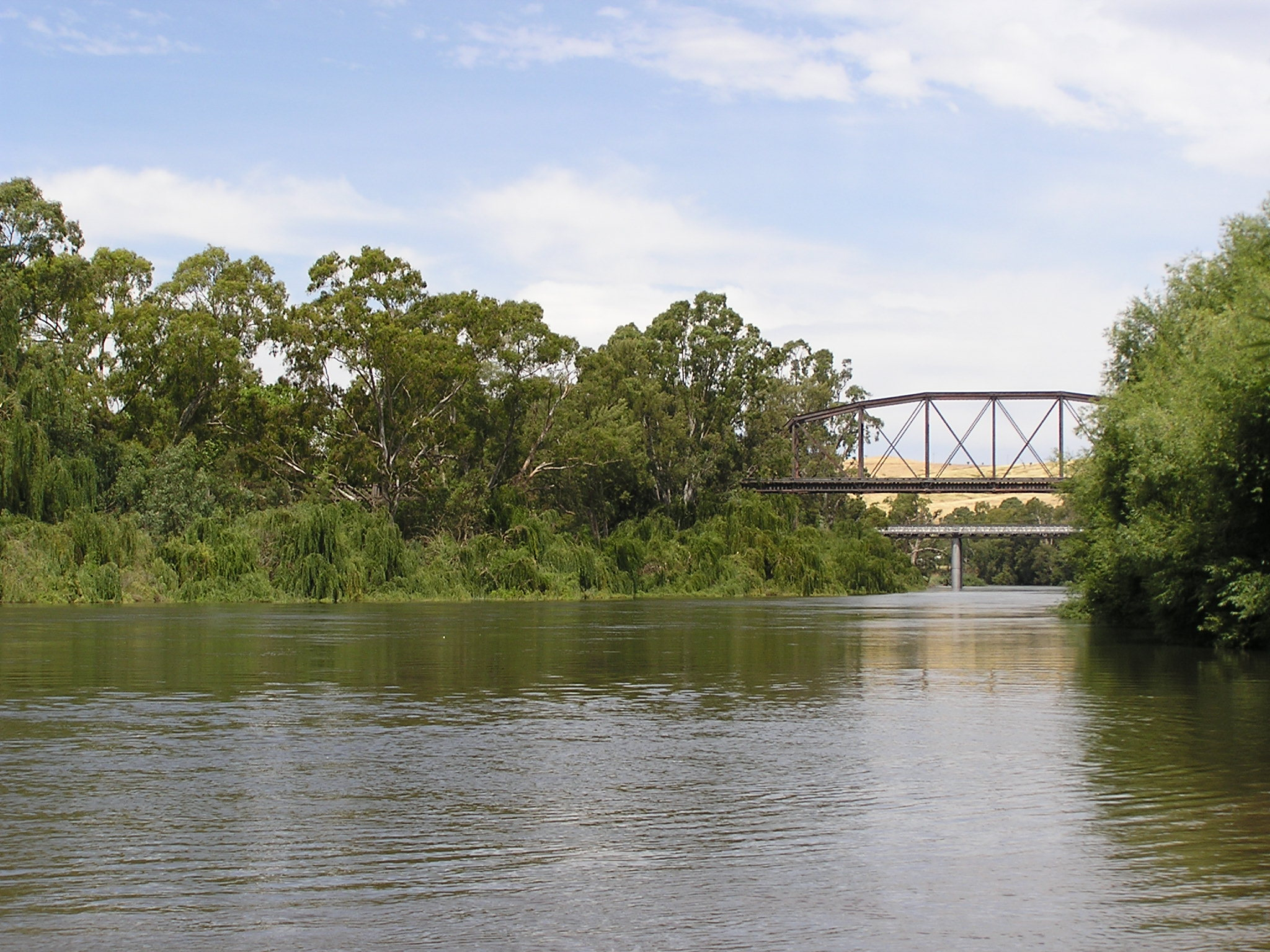
The Murrumbidgee River at Gundagai; the boundary between Clarendon and Wynyard

== Parishes within this county ==
A full list of parishes found within this county; their current LGA and mapping coordinates to the approximate centre of each location is as follows:

Parish	LGA	Coordinates
Bethungra	Junee Shire Council	34°43′54″S 147°50′04″E
Bilda	Junee Shire Council	35°04′54″S 147°39′04″E
Billabung	Junee Shire Council	34°47′54″S 147°48′04″E
Boree	Junee Shire Council	34°50′54″S 147°39′04″E
Bulgan	City of Wagga Wagga	34°57′54″S 147°20′04″E
Bute	Junee Shire Council	34°35′54″S 147°46′04″E
Claris	Junee Shire Council	34°59′54″S 147°40′04″E
Cooba	Junee Shire Council	34°55′54″S 147°52′04″E
Eunanoreenya	City of Wagga Wagga	35°03′54″S 147°29′04″E
Eurongilly	Junee Shire Council	34°55′54″S 147°45′04″E
Gobbagombalin	City of Wagga Wagga	35°02′54″S 147°18′04″E
Gwynne	Junee Shire Council	34°47′54″S 147°30′04″E
Houlaghan	Junee Shire Council	34°43′40″S 147°32′43″E
Hurley	Junee Shire Council	34°36′54″S 147°41′04″E
Ironbong	Junee Shire Council	34°44′54″S 147°45′04″E
Ivor	Junee Shire Council	34°44′54″S 147°40′04″E
Jeralgambeth	Junee Shire Council	34°59′54″S 147°35′04″E
Junee	Junee Shire Council	34°47′54″S 147°33′04″E
Kimo	Cootamundra-Gundagai Regional Council	35°02′54″S 148°00′04″E
Malebo	Junee Shire Council	34°55′54″S 147°23′04″E
Maror	Junee Shire Council	34°50′54″S 147°28′04″E
Merrybundinah	Junee Shire Council	34°51′54″S 147°48′04″E
Mitta Mitta	Junee Shire Council	34°51′54″S 147°54′04″E
Nangus	Cootamundra-Gundagai Regional Council	35°00′54″S 147°57′04″E
North Gundagai	Cootamundra-Gundagai Regional Council	35°00′54″S 148°04′04″E
North Wagga Wagga	City of Wagga Wagga	35°03′54″S 147°23′04″E
Oura	City of Wagga Wagga	35°03′54″S 147°33′04″E
Sebastopol	Temora Shire Council	34°35′54″S 147°34′04″E
South Junee	Junee Shire Council	34°53′54″S 147°31′04″E
Tenandra	Junee Shire Council	34°59′54″S 147°50′04″E
Trevethin	Junee Shire Council	34°40′54″S 147°40′04″E
Ulandra	Junee Shire Council	34°45′54″S 147°54′04″E
Wallace	City of Wagga Wagga	34°57′54″S 147°28′04″E
Wantabadgery	Junee Shire Council	34°59′54″S 147°45′04″E
Wantiool	Junee Shire Council	34°54′54″S 147°39′04″E
Warre Warral	Junee Shire Council	34°38′54″S 147°32′04″E
