= Junee Shire =

- Local government area
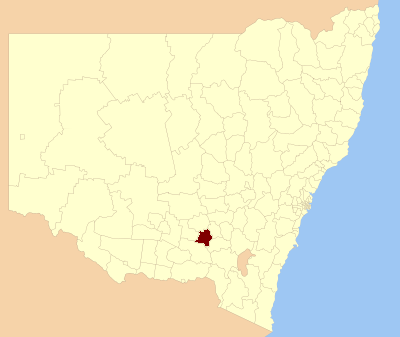
- Location in New South Wales

- Interactive map of Junee Shire
- Coordinates: 34°52′S 147°34′E
- Country: Australia
- State: New South Wales
- Region: Riverina
- Established: 1 January 1981
- Council seat: Junee

Government
  - Mayor: Neil Smith (Unaligned)
  - State electorate: Cootamundra
  - Federal division: Riverina

Area
  - Total: 2,030 km^{2} (780 sq mi)

Population
  - Totals: 6,295 (2016); 6,631 (2018 est.)
  - Density: 3.101/km^{2} (8.032/sq mi)
- Website: Junee Shire
LGAs around Junee Shire
Temora	Temora	Cootamundra-Gundagai
Coolamon	Junee Shire	Cootamundra-Gundagai
Wagga Wagga	Wagga Wagga	Cootamundra-Gundagai

The Junee Shire is a local government area in the Riverina region of New South Wales, Australia. The Shire comprises an area of 2,030 square kilometres (780 sq mi) and is located adjacent to the Olympic Highway and the Main South railway line. It was formed on 1 January 1981 from the amalgamation of the Municipality of Junee and Illabo Shire resulting from the Local Government Areas Amalgamation Act 1980.

The Shire includes the town of Junee and the small towns of Bethungra, Illabo, Wantabadgery, Harefield, Old Junee, Junee Reefs, Dirnaseer and Eurongilly.

The mayor of Junee Shire is Robert John Callow, an independent politician.

== Council ==
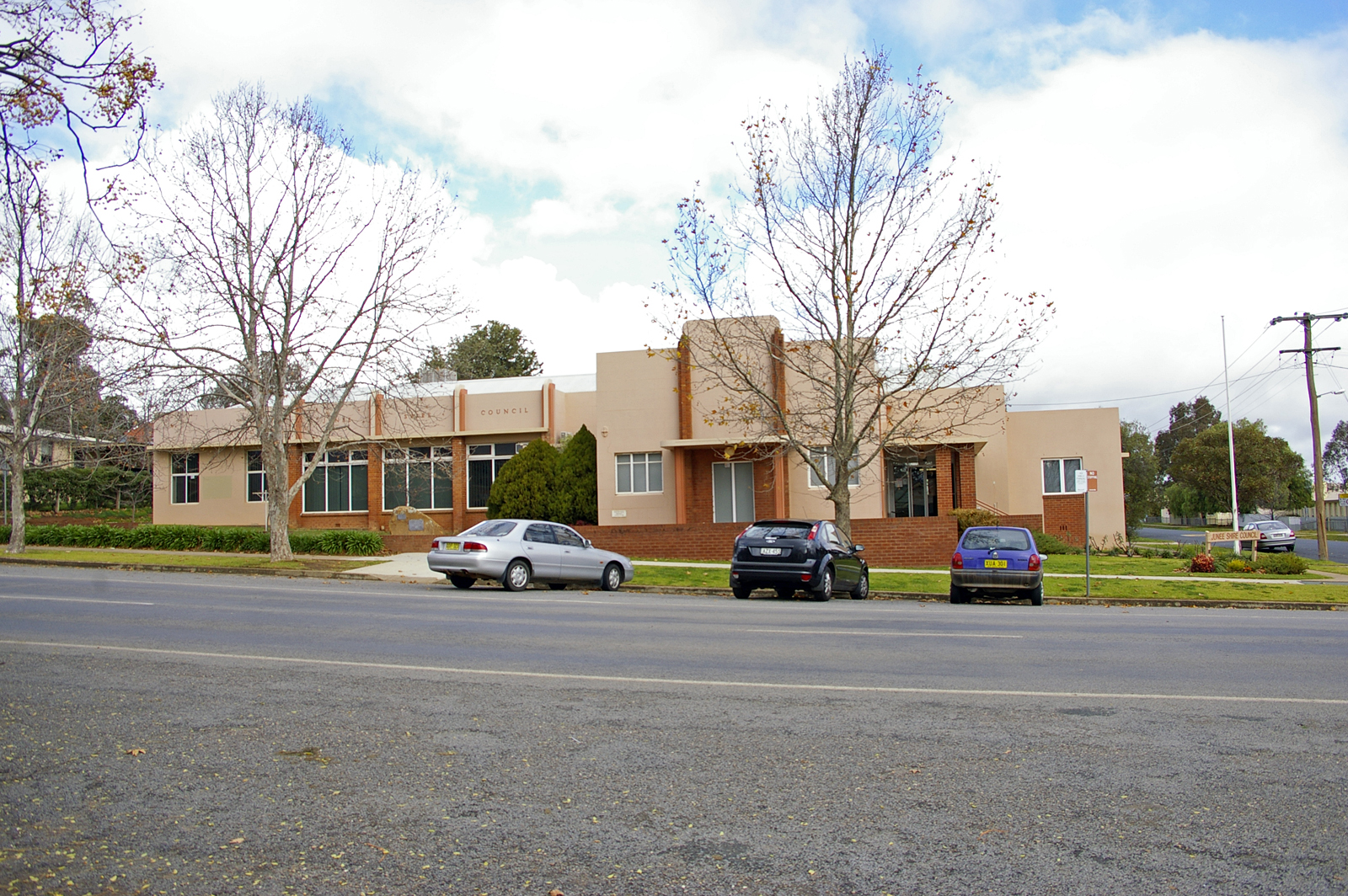
Council Chambers, in Junee

=== Current composition and election method ===
Junee Shire Council is composed of nine councillors elected proportionally as a single ward. All councillors are elected for a fixed four-year term of office. The mayor is usually elected by the councillors each September. The most recent council election was held on 4 December 2021, having been delayed from 2020 due to the COVID-19 pandemic, the makeup of the council is as follows:

Party	Councillors
Independents	7
Independent National	2
Total	9

The current Council, elected in 2021, in order of election, is:

Councillor	Party	Notes
Neil Smith	Independent	Mayor
Matt Austin	Independent National	Deputy Mayor
Pam Halliburton	Independent National	
David Carter	Unaligned	
Andrew Clinton	Independent	
Robin Asmus	Independent	
Mark Cook	Independent	
Marie Knight	Independent	
Bob Callow	Independent	

== Election results ==
=== 2024 ===
2024 New South Wales local elections: Junee
Party	Candidate	Votes	%	±%
Independent National	Pam Halliburton (elected)	unopposed		
Shooters, Fishers, Farmers	Ingrid Eyding (elected)	unopposed		
Independent	David Carter (elected)	unopposed		
Independent National	Matt Austin (elected)	unopposed		
Independent	Bob Callow (elected)	unopposed		
Independent	Marie Knight (elected)	unopposed		
Independent	Andrew Clinton (elected)	unopposed		
Independent	Robin Asmus (elected)	unopposed		
Registered electors				

=== 2021 ===
2021 New South Wales local elections: Junee
Party	Candidate	Votes	%	±%
Independent	Neil Smith (elected)	795	24.4	
Independent National	Pam Halliburton (elected)	476	14.6	
Independent National	Matt Austin (elected)	433	13.3	
Independent	David Carter (elected)	303	9.3	
Independent	Andrew Clinton (elected)	253	7.8	
Independent	Robin Asmus (elected)	180	5.5	
Independent	Mark Cook (elected)	179	5.5	
Independent	Marie Knight (elected)	160	4.9	
Independent	Anna Lashbrook	158	4.8	
Independent	Maggie Salisbury	108	3.3	
Independent	Bob Callow (elected)	107	3.3	
Independent	Linda Calis	57	1.7	
Independent	Robert Minister	53	1.3	
Total formal votes		3,262	95.9	
Informal votes		138	4.1	
Turnout		3,400	85.1	

=== 2016 ===
2016 New South Wales local elections: Junee
Party	Candidate	Votes	%	±%
Independent	Neil Smith (elected 1)	583	19.36	
Independent	Pam Halliburton (elected 2)	486	16.14	
Independent National	Matt Austin (elected 3)	456	15.14	
Independent	Robin Asmus (elected 4)	262	8.70	
Independent	Kerri Walker (elected 5)	222	7.37	
Independent	David Carter (elected 6)	210	6.97	
Independent	Mark Cook (elected 7)	169	5.61	
Independent	Bob Callow (elected 8)	141	4.68	
Independent	Martin Holmes (elected 9)	125	4.15	
Independent	Linda Calis	74	2.46	
Independent	Colin Randall	94	3.12	
Independent	Andrew Clinton	83	2.76	
Independent	Joseph Costello	78	2.59	
Independent	Arron Smith	28	0.93	
Total formal votes		3,011	96.38	
Informal votes		113	3.62	
Turnout		3,124	80.14	

== Gallery ==
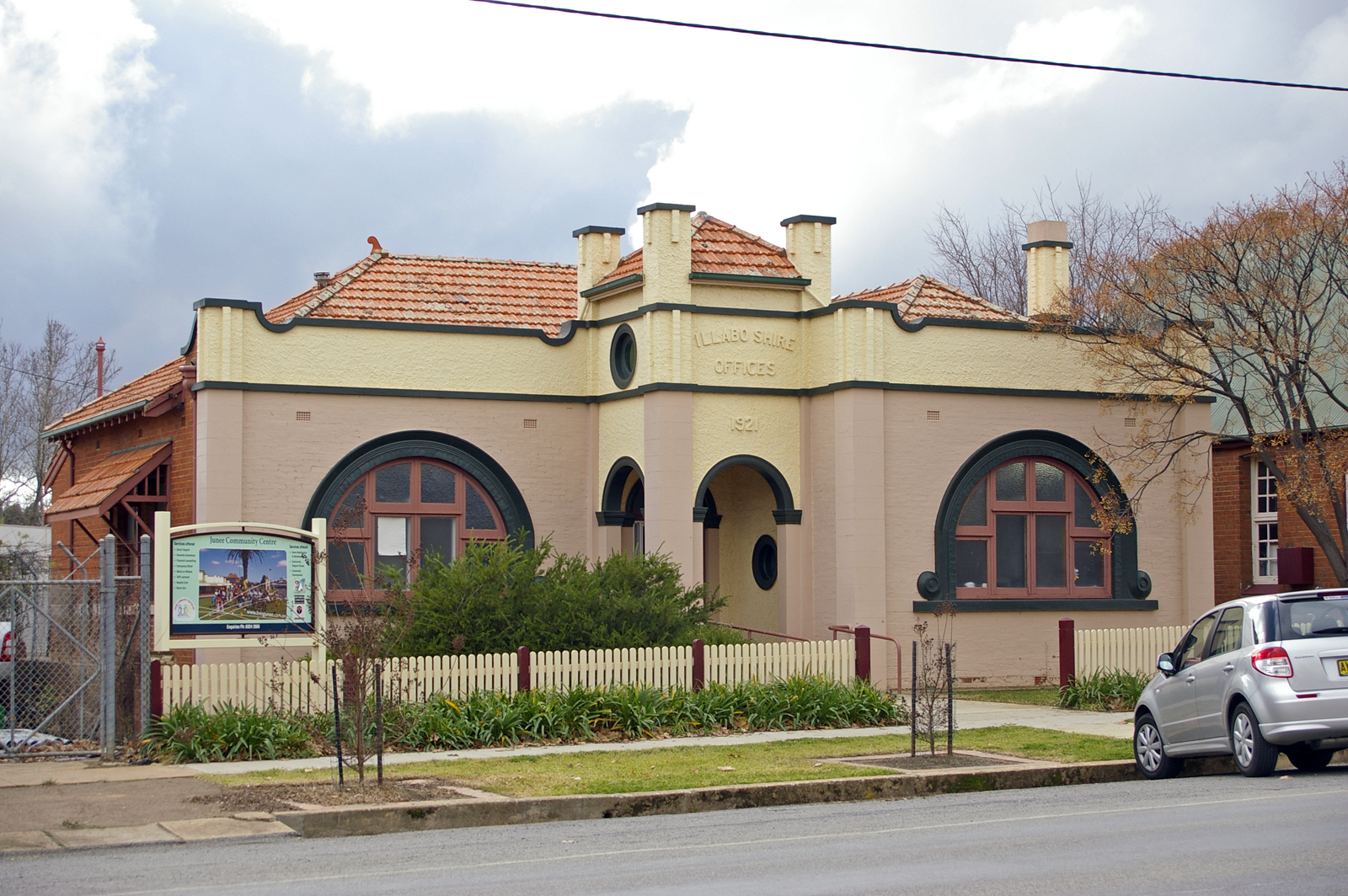
Former Illabo Shire Offices

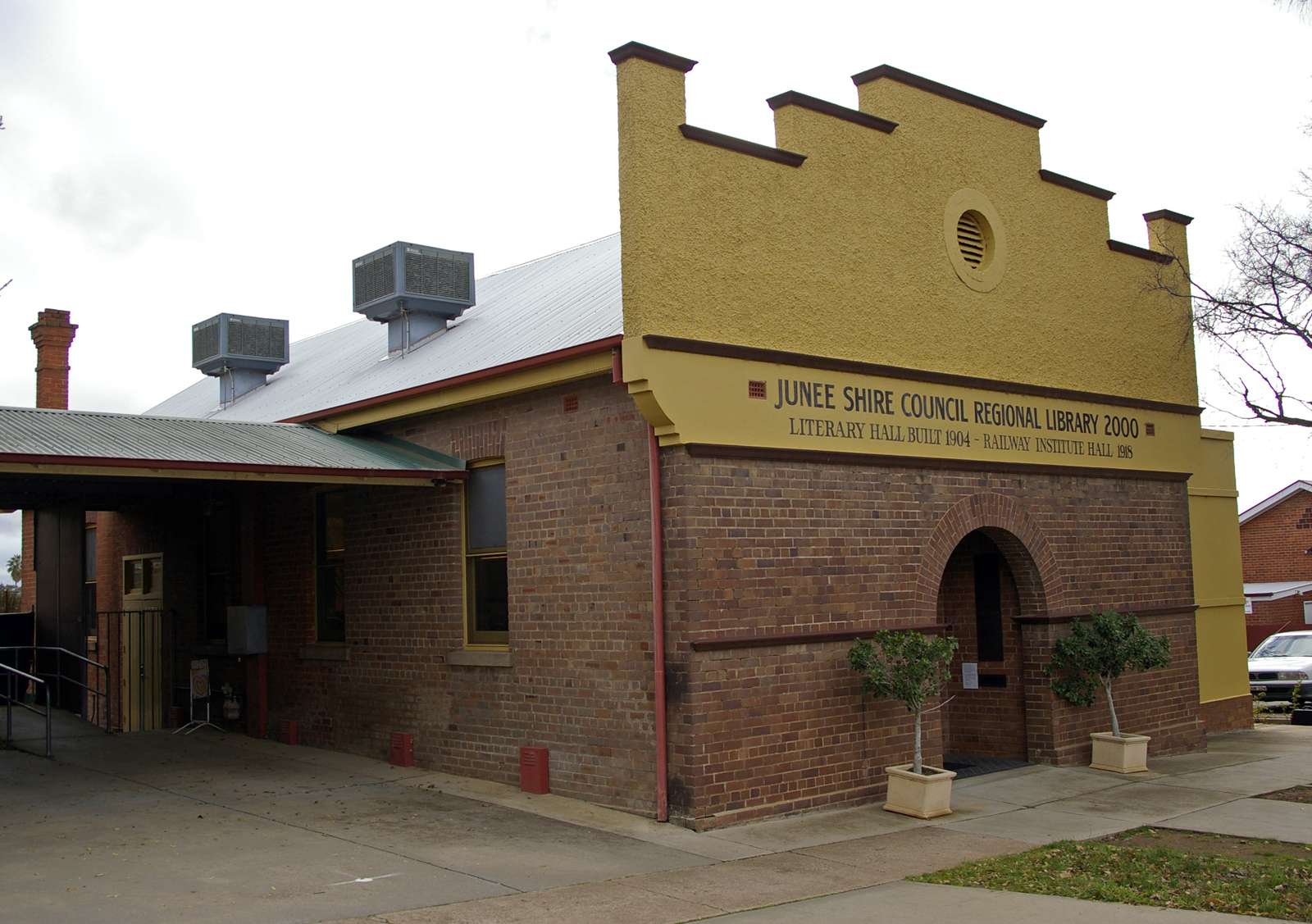
Regional Library

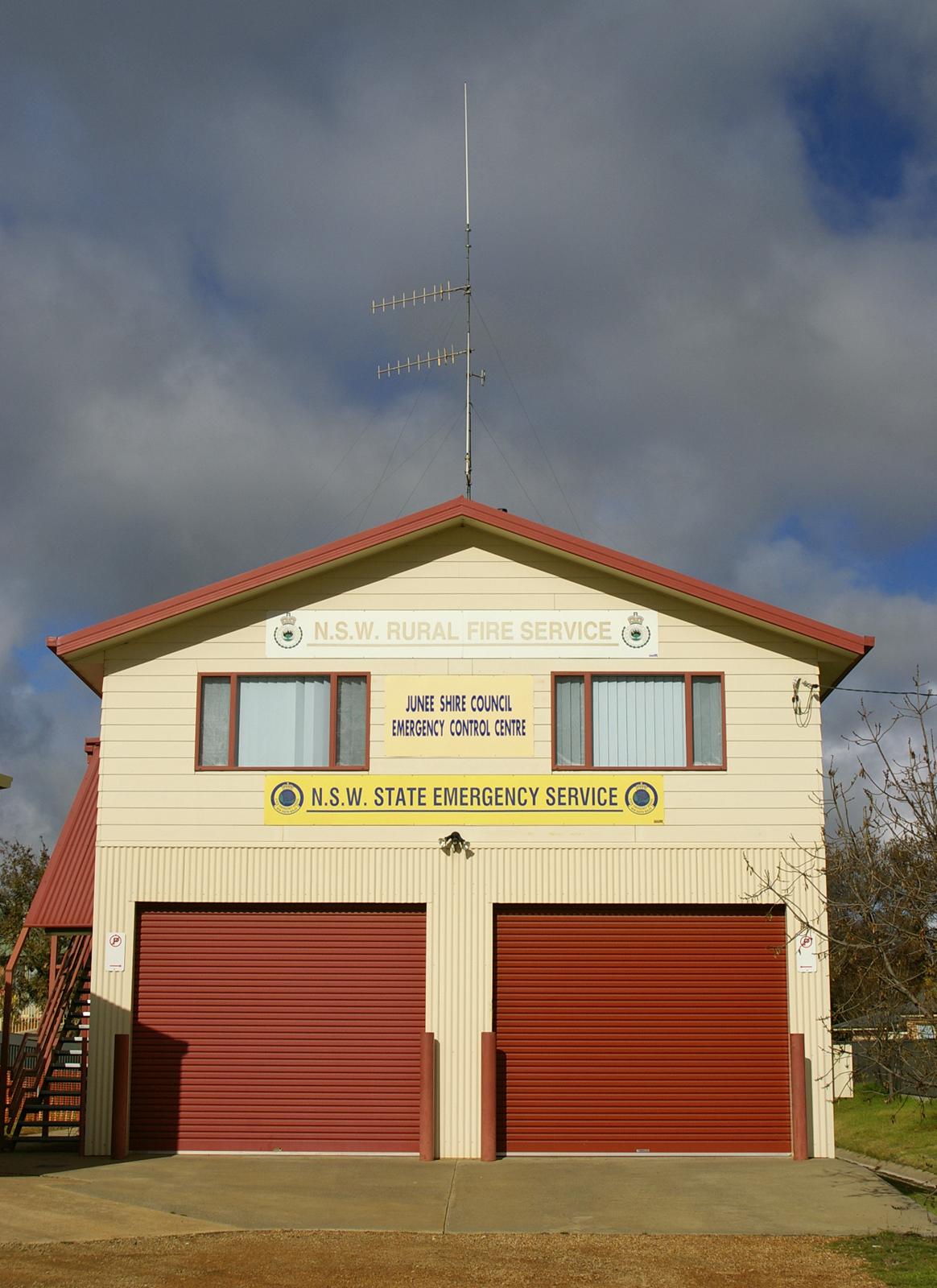
Fire station, Council Emergency Control Centre and NSW State Emergency Service
