= Results of the 2024 New South Wales local elections =

- 14 September 2024

This is a list of local government area results for the 2024 New South Wales local elections.

== Results by LGA ==
- Results of the 2024 New South Wales local elections in Central West
- Results of the 2024 New South Wales local elections in Hunter
- Results of the 2024 New South Wales local elections in Illawarra
- Results of the 2024 New South Wales local elections in Inner Sydney
- Results of the 2024 New South Wales local elections in Mid North Coast
- Results of the 2024 New South Wales local elections in Murray and Far West
- Results of the 2024 New South Wales local elections in New England
- Results of the 2024 New South Wales local elections in Northern Rivers
- Results of the 2024 New South Wales local elections in Orana
- Results of the 2024 New South Wales local elections in Outer Sydney
- Results of the 2024 New South Wales local elections in Riverina
- Results of the 2024 New South Wales local elections in South Coast and Southern Inland

== Statewide results ==
Party	Votes	%	Swing	Seats (Note: Excluding directly-elected mayors.)	Change
Independents (Note: Including local groups (not to be confused with locally-registered political parties).)	1,386,557	32.57	−0.16	722	▼54
Labor	1,107,839	26.02	−0.65	162	▼26
Liberal	750,296	17.62	+0.10	110	▼17
Greens	411,999	9.68	+0.84	73	▲8
Libertarian	87,056	2.04	+1.93	10	▲10
Your Northern Beaches	71,095	1.67	+0.52	7	▲1
Independent Liberal	44,647	1.05	−1.33	16	▲8
Our Local Community	42,834	1.01	−0.80	5	▼5
Independent National	36,336	0.85	+0.45	37	▲28
Shoalhaven Independents Group	30,231	0.71	+0.03	6	▲2
Dai Le	30,052	0.71	+0.24	3	Steady
Lake Mac Independents	28,530	0.67	+0.05	3	Steady
Clover Moore Independent Team	28,201	0.66	−0.43	3	▼1
Residents and Ratepayers	24,839	0.58	+0.17	5	▲1
Community Voice of Australia	23,222	0.55	+0.55	3	▲3
Community First Totally Independent	17,494	0.41	+0.41	3	▲3
Animal Justice	15,634	0.37	+0.13	0	▼1
Independent Labor	14,362	0.34	+0.26	16	▲15
Sustainable Australia	13,865	0.33	+0.15	1	▼1
Community Champions	12,735	0.30	+0.30	1	▲1
Peaceful Bayside	11,536	0.27	+0.27	2	▲2
Shooters, Fishers and Farmers	10,619	0.25	−0.05	4	▼1
Residents First Woollahra	9,393	0.22	−0.05	5	Steady
Yvonne Weldon Independents	8,144	0.19	+0.19	1	▲1
Liverpool Community Independents Team	7,547	0.18	−0.09	1	▼1
Serving Mosman	7,062	0.17	0.00	3	▼1
Central Coast Heart	3,799	0.09	+0.09	0	Steady
Lorraine Wearne Independents	3,722	0.09	−0.15	1	Steady
Australia Multinational Unity Inc	3,715	0.09	+0.09	0	Steady
Small Business	3,474	0.08	−0.22	1	Steady
Strathfield Independents	3,401	0.08	−0.02	1	▼1
Battler	1,848	0.04	+0.04	0	Steady
Socialist Alliance	1,691	0.04	−0.03	0	Steady
Australian Christians	1,585	0.04	+0.04	0	Steady
Australian Democrats	967	0.02	+0.02	0	Steady
Independent One Nation	757	0.02	+0.02	0	Steady
Family First	241	0.01	+0.01	0	Steady
Public Education Party	82	0.00	+0.00	0	Steady
Independent United Australia				1	▲1
Formal votes	4,257,457				
Registered voters / turnout					

== Maps ==
=== Statewide results ===
Results by ward in Greater Sydney and Greater Newcastle

=== LGA results by ward ===
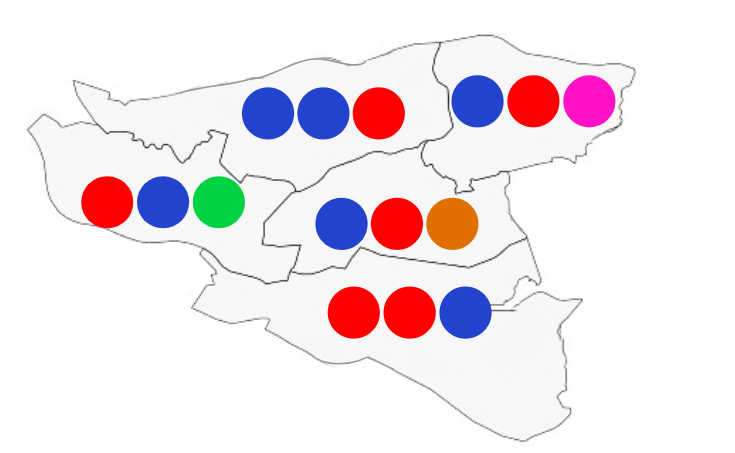
Parramatta
