= Results of the 2024 New South Wales local elections in South Coast and Southern Inland =

2024 New South Wales local elections (South Coast and Southern Inland)
- 14 September 2024

This is a list of results for the 2024 New South Wales local elections in the South Coast and Southern Inland region.

The region covers eight local government areas (LGAs), including Queanbeyan–Palerang Regional Council, while the City of Shoalhaven is considered part of the Illawarra region.

== Bega Valley ==
2024 Bega Valley Shire Council election
- 14 September 2024

All 9 seats on Bega Valley Shire Council (Note: Excluding the mayor, who is directly-elected.) 6 seats needed for a majority

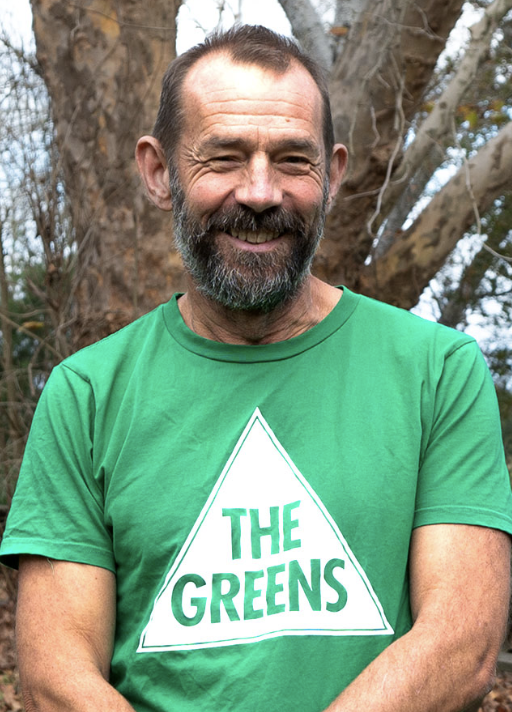
	First party	Second party
	IFC	IND
Leader	Mitchell Nadin	N/A
Party	Inds For Change	Independents
Last election	Did not exist	7 seats
Seats before	2	5
Seats won	3	2
Seat change	▲1	▼3
Primary vote	7,374	5,695
Percentage	34.63%	26.76%
Swing	▲34.63	▼43.54
	Third party	Fourth party
Leader	Helen O'Neil	Peter Haggar
Party	Labor	Greens
Last election	1 seat	1 seat
Seats before	1	1
Seats won	2	1
Seat change	▲2	Steady
Primary vote	5,296	2,926
Percentage	24.87	13.74
Swing	▲7.57	▲1.34
Largest party before election
Independents
Subsequent largest party
Inds For Change

Bega Valley Shire Council is composed of eight councillors elected proportionally to a single ward. The 2024 election also saw the first appointment of a popularly-elected mayor. As such, Bega Valley Shire Council consists of nine representatives total.

In November 2022, councillor Russell Fitzpatrick joined the Liberal Party to contest the 2023 state election in the electorate of Bega. He was unsuccessful, receiving 39.60% of the two-party-preferred vote before resigning as a Liberal member sometime in 2023 or 2024. Fitzpatrick was elected as mayor by popular vote on 1 October 2024.

Incumbent councillors Mitchell Nadin and David Porter, who were both elected as ungrouped independents in 2021, ran on a joint ticket called "Independents For Change". Greens councillor Cathy Griff did not seek re-election.

=== Bega Valley results ===
2024 New South Wales local elections: Bega Valley
Party	Candidate	Votes	%	±%
Independents For Change	1. Mitchell Nadin (elected); 2. David Porter (elected); 3. Peggy Noble (elected); 4. Jason Hetherington; 5. Morgan Eneberg	7,374	34.63	+34.63
Labor	1. Helen O'Neil (elected); 2. Simon Daly (elected); 3. David Neyle; 4. Nicola Collins	5,296	24.87	+7.57
Greens	1. Peter Haggar (elected); 2. Liane Munro; 3. Emma Goward; 4. Vivian Harris; 5. Jamie Shaw	2,926	13.74	+1.34
Independent	Russell Fitzpatrick (elected mayor)	2,044	9.60	−3.50
Independent	Tony Allen (elected)	1,836	8.62	−3.48
Independent	Clair Mudaliar (elected)	1,082	5.08	+5.08
Independent	Phillip Dummett	733	3.44	+3.44
Total formal votes		21,291	90.87	−0.53
Informal votes		2,138	9.13	+0.53
Turnout		23,429		

== Eurobodalla ==
2024 Eurobodalla Shire Council election
- 14 September 2024

All 8 seats on Eurobodalla Shire Council 5 seats needed for a majority

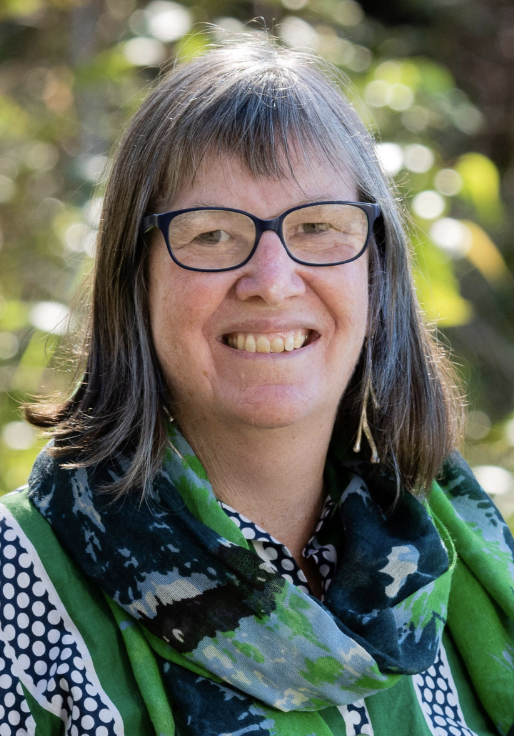
	First party	Second party	Third party
	AE	TP	OE
Leader	Mathew Hatcher	Rob Pollock	Phil Constable
Party	Advance Eurobadalla (Note: Local group, not a registered political party)	Team Pollock	One Eurobadalla
Last election	2 seats	2 seat	Did not exist
Seats before	3	2	0
Seats won	3	1	2
Seat change	Steady	▼1	▲2
Primary vote	7,105	4,225	4,015
Percentage	29.1%	17.3%	16.4%
	Fourth party	Fifth party	Sixth party
		TMT
Leader	Sharon Winslade	Anthony Maybe	Colleen Turner
Party	Labor	The Mayne Team	Greens
Last election	1 seat	1 seat	1 seat
Seats before	1	1	1
Seats won	1	1	1
Seat change	Steady	Steady	Steady
Primary vote	2,821	2,255	1,706
Percentage	11.5%	9.2%	7.0%
Largest party before election
Independents
Subsequent largest party
Independents

Eurobodalla Shire Council is composed of eight councillors elected proportionally to a single ward, as well as a popularly-elected mayor.

=== Eurobodalla results ===
2024 New South Wales local elections: Eurobodalla
Party	Candidate	Votes	%	±%
Advance Eurobodalla	1. Mathew Hatcher (elected mayor); 2. Amber Schutz (elected 1); 3. Laurence Babington (elected 5); 4. Ronald Meek; 5. Carrie Taylor; 6. Rebecca Mahon; 7. Charles Stuart	7,105	29.1	+8.9
Team Pollock	1. Rob Pollock (elected 2); 2. Sofia Keady; 3. John Tait; 4. Keira Marchini; 5. Emily Zahra; 6. James Thomson; 7. Lindsay Brown	4,225	17.3	−1.4
One Eurobodalla	1. Phil Constable (elected 3); 2. Mick Johnson (elected 8); 3. Trish Hellier; 4. Kristy Beecham	4,015	16.4	
Labor	1. Sharon Winslade (elected 4); 2. Maureen Searson; 3. Maureen Ellis; 4. Gail Vincent	2,821	11.5	−3.6
The Mayne Team	1. Anthony Mayne (elected 6); 2. Karyn Starmer; 3. Michelle Hamrosi; 4. Sally Christiansen; 5. David Grice	2,255	9.2	−7.7
Greens	1. Colleen Turner (elected 7); 2. Joslyn van der Moolen; 3. Charlie Bell; 4. Niall O'Donnell	1,706	7.0	−3.8
Independent	1. Claire McAsh; 2. John Hawke; 3. Krystal Tritton; 4. Gary Traynor	1,153	4.7	
Independent	1. Jason Ford; 2. Marlene Brayshaw; 3. Dave Greer; 4. Rosemary Deadman; 5. Robert Fortune; 6. Geoff Martin	957	3.9	
Independent	Neil Gow	213	0.9	
Total formal votes		24,450	91.3	
Informal votes		2,341	8.7	
Turnout		26,791	81.9	

== Goulburn Mulwaree ==
2024 Goulburn Mulwaree Council election
- 14 September 2024

All 9 seats on Goulburn Mulwaree Council 5 seats needed for a majority
	First party	Second party	Third party
	IND	DG
Leader	N/A	Nina Dillon	Jason Shepard
Party	Ungrouped Independents	Dillon Group	Labor
Last election	6 seats	Did not exist	1 seat
Seats before	6	0	1
Seats won	3	2	2
Seat change	▼3	▲2	▲1
Primary vote	7,722	6,565	3,190
Percentage	42.3%	36.0%	17.5%
Swing	▼28.4	▲36.0	▲0.1
Largest party before election
Independents
Subsequent largest party
Independents

Goulburn Mulwaree Council is composed of nine councillors elected proportionally to a single ward.

The Greens will not recontest, following the loss of their only seat in 2021.

=== Goulburn Mulwaree results ===
2024 New South Wales local elections: Goulburn Mulwaree
Party	Candidate	Votes	%	±%
Dillon Group	1. Nina Dillon (elected 1); 2. Christopher O'Mahony (elected 4); 3. Keith Smith (elected 5); 4. Chloe Hurley; 5. Paul Kemp	6,565	36.0	
Labor	1. Jason Shepard (elected 2); 2. Liz McKeon (elected 9); 3. Danielle Marsden-Ballard; 4. Anna Wurth-Crawford; 5. James Corbett	3,190	17.5	+0.1
Independent	Bob Kirk (elected 3)	2,303	12.6	−10.4
Independent	Caitlin Flint (elected 6)	1,280	7.0	
Independent	Michael Prevedello (elected 7)	1,118	6.1	−2.8
Shooters, Fishers, Farmers	Andy Wood	761	4.2	−3.1
Independent	Samuel Ross	714	3.9	
Independent	Steven Ruddell	563	3.1	−1.7
Independent	Daniel Strickland (elected 8)	537	2.9	−5.3
Independent	Carol James	415	2.3	−3.8
Independent	Adrian Beresford-Wylie	356	2.0	
Independent	Matthew Kane	189	1.0	
Independent	Richard Orchard	168	0.9	
Independent	Shaun Allen	79	0.4	
Total formal votes		18,238	91.2	
Informal votes		1,755	8.8	
Turnout		19,993	88.3	

== Hilltops ==
2024 Hilltops Council election
- 14 September 2024

All 11 seats on Hilltops Council 6 seats needed for a majority
	First party
	IND
Party	Independent
Last election	11 seats
Seats before	11
Seats won	11
Seat change	Steady
Percentage	100%
Largest party before election
Independents
Subsequent largest party
Independents

Hilltops Council is composed of 11 councillors elected proportionally to a single ward.

In 2022, councillor Matthew Stadtmiller (a former member of the Shooters, Fishers and Farmers Party) joined the Labor Party. However, his membership was suspended on 27 October 2022 after he was charged with assault. Stadtmiller is seeking re-election in Hilltops, where he is a non-resident, while also contesting Yass Valley Council.

=== Hilltops results ===
2024 New South Wales local elections: Hilltops
Party	Candidate	Votes	%	±%
Independent	Brian Ingram (elected)	1,740	15.8	+6.8
Independent	Neil Langford (elected)	1,612	14.7	
Independent	Matthew Stadtmiller (elected)	1,271	11.6	−1.5
Independent	Alison Foreman (elected)	959	8.7	−7.3
Independent	Jake Davis (elected)	951	8.6	
Independent	Tony Flanery (elected)	884	8.0	−0.8
Independent	Joanne Mackay (elected)	525	4.8	−3.1
Independent	James Blackwell (elected)	521	4.7	
Independent	Mary Dodd (elected)	479	4.4	−0.8
Independent	Abdullah Sultan	435	4.0	
Independent	Michelle Gallo (elected)	418	3.8	
Independent	Patrick Fitzgerald	349	3.2	−0.9
Independent	Fiona Douglas (elected)	315	2.9	
Independent	Jennifer Smith	253	2.3	
Independent	Michael Skillen	239	2.2	
Independent	Brandon Douglas	51	0.5	
Total formal votes		11,002	91.9	
Informal votes		972	8.1	
Turnout		11,974	82.1	

== Queanbeyan–Palerang ==
2024 Queanbeyan–Palerang Regional Council election
- 14 September 2024

All 9 seats on Queanbeyan–Palerang Regional Council 6 seats needed for a majority

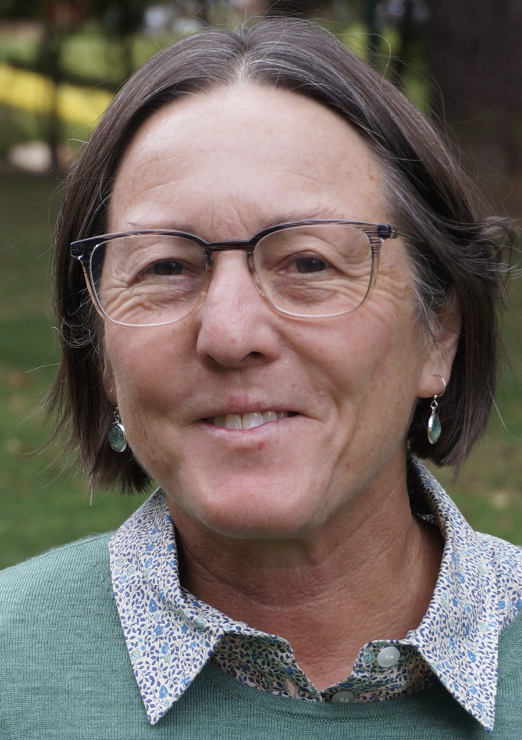
	First party	Second party
		TW
Leader	Bryce Wilson	Kenrick Winchester
Party	Labor	Team Winchester
Last election	3 seats	2 seats
Seats before	3	1
	Third party	Fourth party
Leader	Ross Macdonald	Katrina Willis
Party	Liberal	Greens
Last election	2 seats	1 seat
Seats before	2	1
Largest party before election
Labor
Subsequent largest party
TBD

Queanbeyan–Palerang Regional Council is composed of nine councillors elected proportionally to a single ward.

In October 2023, councillor Edwina Webster resigned, citing personal reasons. Her seat was left vacant until the election.

=== Queanbeyan–Palerang results ===
2024 New South Wales local elections: Queanbeyan–Palerang
Party	Candidate	Votes	%	±%
Liberal	1. Ross Macdonald (elected 1); 2. Mark Schweikert (elected 5); 3. Morgan Broadbent (elected 10); 4. Robert Schwartz; 5. Louise Burton; 6. Jacqueline Ternouth; 7. Wayne Brown; 8. Margaret Royds	8,248	23.3	+6.1
Team Winchester	1. Kenrick Winchester (elected 3); 2. Bill Waterhouse (elected 7); 3. Margot Sachse; 4. Kylie Prescott; 5. Alex Tine; 6. Shane Shipa; 7. Peter Lindbeck; 8. Dean Martin; 9. Tony Wood; 10. Tony Rayner; 11. Jan Browne	7,785	22.0	+5.7
Labor	1. Bryce Wilson (elected 2); 2. Esma Livermore (elected 6); 3. John Preston (elected 11); 4. Barrina South; 5. Timothy Nicholson; 6. Shelley Evans; 7. Michael MacWilliam	7,198	20.3	−1.6
Grundy Independents	1. Mareeta Grundy (elected 4); 2. Shane Ivimey; 3. Johnny Lange; 4. Rachel Scattergood; 5. Antoni (Billie) Woods; 6. Bec Edwards; 7. Sian Rinaldi; 8. Michael Bagley	3,478	9.8	+0.4
Greens	1. Katrina Willis (elected 8); 2. James Ansell; 3. Tonya Rooney; 4. Kathleen Maher; 5. Gregory Buckman; 6. Simon Wooldridge	2,929	8.3	−1.7
Independent	1. Steve Taskovski (elected 9); 2. Manpreet Singh Cheema; 3. Velice Trajanoski; 4. Lou Baldan; 5. Samantha Kirchner; 6. Bashir Fayaq; 7. Charles Tran; 8. Hasina Ahmed; 9. Frank Agresta; 10. Alan Hill; 11. Zoran Duckinoski	2,555	7.2	−0.2
Independent	1. Trevor Hicks; 2. Scott Hart; 3. Natasha Abbott; 4. Horst Kirchner; 5. Bonnie O'Brien; 6. Jason Webb	1,194	3.4	
Sustainable Australia	1. James Holgate; 2. Michael Thompson; 3. John Reynolds; 4. Katrina Holgate; 5. Darren Garnon; 6. Philip Snare	1,082	3.1	+3.0
Independent	1. Rachael Macdonald; 2. Wayne Reynolds; 3. May Kowalski; 4. Todd McKittrick; 5. Samantha Kew; 6. Joanne Lawrence	565	1.6	
Independent	Richard Graham	370	1.1	
Total formal votes		35,404	95.1	
Informal votes		1,822	4.9	
Turnout		37,226	82.1	

== Snowy Monaro ==
2024 Snowy Monaro Regional Council election
- 14 September 2024

All 11 seats on Snowy Monaro Regional Council 6 seats needed for a majority
	First party	Second party
	IND
Leader	N/A	Tanya Higgins
Party	Independents (Note: Including local groups (not to be confused with locally-registered political parties).)	Labor
Last election	8 seats	2 seats
Seats before	9	2
	Third party	Fourth party
	BLUE	SFF
Leader	John Rooney	Mathieu Nolte
Party	Blue Team	SFF
Last election	Did not contest	Did not contest
Seats before	0	0
Largest party before election
Independents
Subsequent largest party
TBD

Snowy Monaro Regional Council is composed of 11 councillors elected proportionally to a single ward.

In September 2022, Greens councillor John Castellari resigned. He was replaced via countback by independent Craig Mitchell, and the Greens are not recontesting Snowy Monaro in 2024.

Ahead of the election, The Sydney Morning Herald reported independent candidate Andrew Thaler was a "serial pest" who used social media to "insult prominent local women". Thaler's candidacy was denounced by Labor, who claimed that Team Williamson, Group D (James Gilbert) and the Reuben Rose Group were all linked to him.

Labor and the Shooters, Fishers and Farmers Party were the only registered parties endorsing candidates. An Independent Liberal group, "John Rooney's Blue Team", also contested.

=== Snowy Monaro results ===
2024 New South Wales local elections: Snowy Monaro
Party	Candidate	Votes	%	±%
Independent	1. Chris Hanna (elected 1); 2. Tricia Hopkins (elected 6); 3. Karlee Johnson; 4. Cindy Chawner; 5. Anne O'Leary; 6. Guy Palframan	2,130	18.5	−20.0
Labor	1. Tanya Higgins (elected 2); 2. Lynda Summers (elected 7); 3. Bill Walker; 4. Anthony Garvin; 5. Penny Judge; 6. Kylie Phillips	1,924	16.7	+0.4
Independent	1. Bob Stewart (elected 3); 2. Nick Elliott (elected 9); 3. Megan Downie; 4. Cathy Ingram; 5. Suzanne Bate; 6. Richard Murphy; 7. Michael Downie	1,734	15.0	+7.1
Team Williamson	1. Luke Williamson (elected 4); 2. Mick Newman; 3. Vele Civijovski; 4. Hamish Williamson; 5. Michael Freeman; 6. Nicholas Kopievsky; 7. Katherine Corbett	1,505	13.0	+9.7
Reuben Rose Group	1. Reuben Rose (elected 5); 2. Chris Chan; 3. Sidonie Carpenter; 4. Stuart McKenzie; 5. Shawn Joynt; 6. Jeremy Meeks	1,293	11.2	
John Rooney's Blue Team	1. John Rooney (elected 11); 2. Anna Lucas; 3. Bernard Rooney; 4. Adrian Ljubic; 5. Fiona Foster; 6. Catherine Turnbull	585	5.1	+3.3
Independent	1. Andrew Thaler (elected 10); 2. Charles Kolano; 3. Nicolaas Luntungan; 4. Michal Chotar; 5. Faye Simpson; 6. Allen Simpson; 7. Kylie Paske	545	4.7	+2.8
Independent	Narelle Davis (elected 8)	342	3.0	
Independent	Lynley Miners	314	2.7	
Independent	Craig Mitchell	231	2.0	−0.5
Independent	Vickie Pollard	202	1.8	−0.6
Independent	Maree Stevenson	175	1.5	
Independent	Peter Beer	170	1.5	−2.4
Shooters, Fishers, Farmers	Mathieu Nolte	140	1.2	
Independent	1. James Gilbert; 2. Lionel Harris; 3. Dave Chatterton	133	1.2	
Independent	Rachelle Edwards	51	0.4	
Independent	Bernie McDonald	35	0.3	
Independent	Barry Bridges	19	0.2	
Independent	Oliver Moran	13	0.1	
Independent	Malcolm Bruce	8	0.1	0.0
Total formal votes		11,547	92.9	
Informal votes		880	7.1	
Turnout		12,427	83.5	

== Upper Lachlan ==
2024 Upper Lachlan Shire Council election
- 14 September 2024

All 9 seats on Upper Lachlan Shire Council 5 seats needed for a majority
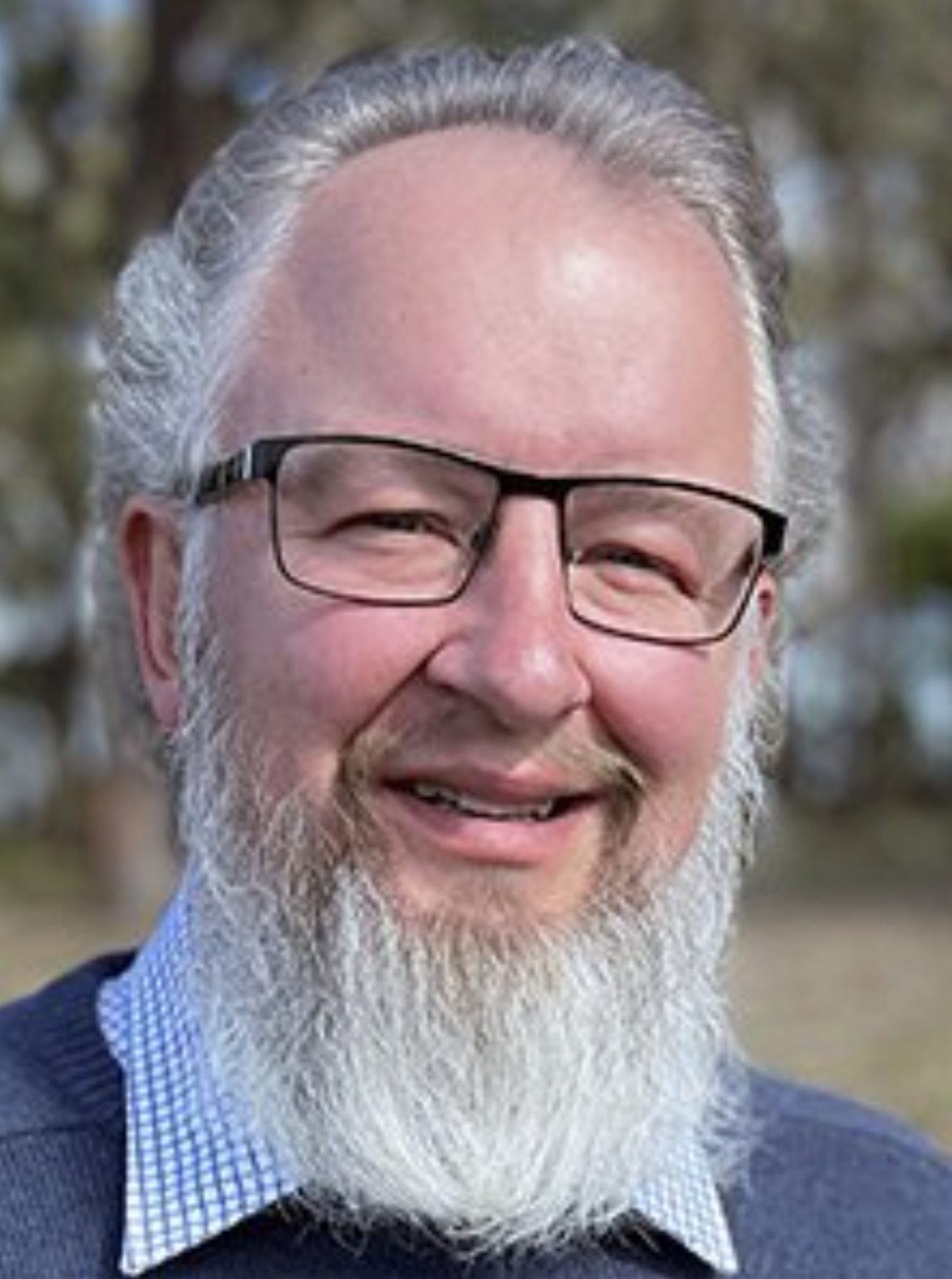
	First party	Second party	Third party
	IND	IND
Leader	N/A	N/A	Gregory Harris
Party	Independents	Ind. Labor	Libertarian
Last election	8 seats	1 seat	Did not contest
Seats before	8	1	0
Seats won	7	1	1
Seat change	▼1	Steady	▲1
Primary vote	4,155	506	450
Percentage	81.30%	9.90%	8.80%
Swing			▲8.80
Largest party before election
Independents
Subsequent largest party
Independents

Upper Lachlan Shire Council is composed of nine councillors elected proportionally to a single ward.

The Libertarian Party was the only party endorsing a candidate.

=== Upper Lachlan results ===
2024 New South Wales local elections: Upper Lachlan
Party	Candidate	Votes	%	±%
Independent	Rob Cameron (elected)	741	14.50	
Independent	Paul Culhane (elected)	741	14.50	
Independent	Terry Yallouris (elected)	480	9.39	
Independent	John Searl (elected)	471	9.22	
Libertarian	Gregory Harris (elected)	450	8.80	
Independent	Susan Reynolds (elected)	442	8.65	
Independent	Vivienne Flanagan (elected)	383	7.49	
Independent Labor	Simon Peirce (elected)	369	7.22	
Independent	Alexandra Meggitt (elected)	306	5.99	
Independent	Dennis Crowe	236	4.62	
Independent	Paul Mills	234	4.58	
Independent Labor	Nathan McDonald	137	2.68	
Independent	Graham Dyer	121	2.37	
Total formal votes		5,111	90.96	
Informal votes		508	9.04	
Turnout		5,619	84.50	

== Yass Valley ==
2024 Yass Valley Council election
- 14 September 2024

All 9 seats on Yass Valley Council 5 seats needed for a majority
- Registered: 12,998
- Turnout: 10,511 (80.87%)
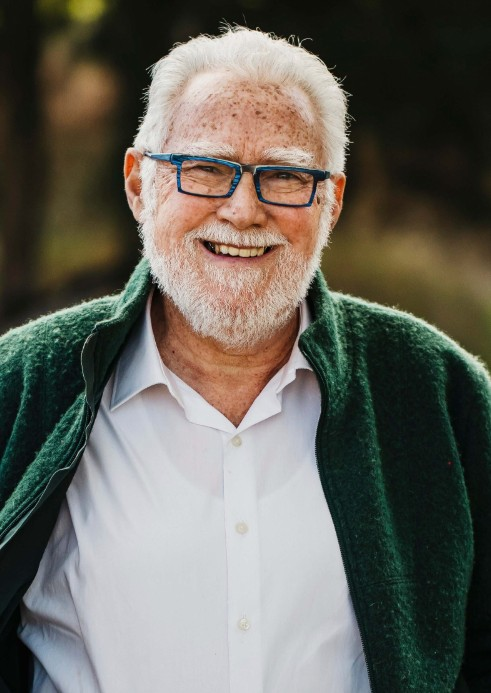
	First party	Second party
	IND
Leader	N/A	Adrian Cameron
Party	Independents	Greens
Last election	8 seats	1 seat	Did not contest
Seats before	8	1	0
Seats won	8	1
Seat change		Steady
Primary vote	7,479	1,421	758
Percentage	77.44	14.71	7.85
Largest party before election
Independents
Largest party after election
Independents

Yass Valley Council is composed of nine councillors elected proportionally to a single ward.

Hilltops councillor Matthew Stadtmiller is contesting Yass Valley while also seeking re-election in Hilltops.

=== Yass Valley results ===
2024 New South Wales local elections: Yass Valley
Party	Candidate	Votes	%	±%
Greens	1. Adrian Cameron (elected); 2. Tanya Cullen	1,421	14.71	
Independent	Kristin Butler (elected)	1,131	11.71	
Independent	David Rothwell (elected)	953	9.87	
Independent	Fleur Flanery (elected)	935	9.68	
Independent	Allan McGrath (elected)	883	9.14	
Independent	Cecil Burgess (elected)	869	9.00	
Independent	David Carter (elected)	814	8.43	
Independent	Jasmin Jones (elected)	756	7.83	
Independent	Alvaro Charry (elected)	758	7.85	
Independent	Cayla Pothan	701	7.26	
Independent	Matthew Stadtmiller	437	4.52	
Total formal votes		9,658	91.88	
Informal votes		853	8.12	
Turnout		10,511	80.87	
