= Results of the 2021 New South Wales local elections in Illawarra =

This is a list of results for the 2021 New South Wales local elections in the Illawarra region.

== Kiama ==
Elected councillor	Party
Kathy Rice	Greens
Imogen Draisma	Labor
Mark Croxford	YCC
Karen Renkema-Lang	S.A.F.E.
Neil Reilly	Team Reilly
Matt Brown	WLKGJ
Jodi Keast	Greens
Stuart Larkins	Labor
Warren Steel	Independent

2021 New South Wales local elections: Kiama
Party	Candidate	Votes	%	±%
	Greens	4,070	27.1	+3.3
	Labor	2,553	17.0	+17.0
	Your Community Candidates	2,030	13.5	
	You're in S.A.F.E. Hands	1,963	13.1	
	We Love Kiama Gerringong Jamberoo	1,706	11.4	
	Team Reilly	1,675	11.2	
	Independent	1,019	6.8	
Total formal votes		15,016	96.0	
Informal votes		628	4.0	
Turnout		15,644	86.9	

== Shellharbour ==
2021 Shellharbour City Council election
← 2017	4 December 2021	2024 →

All 8 seats on Shellharbour City Council (Note: Excluding the mayor, who is directly-elected.) 5 seats needed for a majority
	First party	Second party
		IND
Leader	Marianne Saliba	N/A
Party	Labor	Independents (Note: Including local groups (not to be confused with locally-registered political parties).)
Last election	3 seats	4 seats
Seats before	3	4
Seats won	4	4
Seat change	▲1	Steady
First preference vote	21,199	13,083
Percentage	61.8%	38.2%
Swing	▲12.5	▼11.1
Largest party before election
Independents
Subsequent largest party
TBD

Shellharbour is composed of four two-member wards and a directly-elected mayor. Prior to this election, the council was undivided and the mayor was chosen by councillors, but a referendum held in 2017 saw voters change the electoral system.

The Liberal Party did not endorse any candidates, including its one councillor elected in 2017.

=== Shellharbour results ===
2021 New South Wales local elections: Shellharbour
Party	Votes	%	Swing	Seats	Change
Labor	21,199	61.8	+12.5	4	▲1
Kellie Marsh Independents	8,746	25.5		1	
Independent	5,583	16.3		2	
Local Voice	3,454	10.1		1	
Community Voice	3,416	10.0		0	
Formal votes	34,282	94.9			
Informal votes	1,845	5.1			
Total votes	36,127	100.0			
Registered voters / turnout	55,825	64.71			

=== A Ward ===
2021 New South Wales local elections: A Ward
Party	Candidate	Votes	%	±%
Kellie Marsh Independents	1. Kellie Marsh (elected); 2. Shane Bitschkat	8,746	66.6	+66.6
Labor	1. Maree Edwards (elected); 2. Mick Moon	4,392	33.4	+33.4
Total formal votes		13,138	95.4	N/A
Informal votes		640	4.6	N/A
Turnout		13,778	88.0	N/A

=== B Ward ===
2021 New South Wales local elections: B Ward
Party	Candidate	Votes	%	±%
Labor	1. Moira Hamilton (elected); 2. Aarron Vann	3,657	34.7	+34.7
Local Voice	1. John Davey (elected); 2. Craig Ridding	3,454	32.8	+32.8
Community Voice	1. Peter Moran; 2. Tammy Larkings	3,416	32.4	+32.4
Total formal votes		10,527	93.8	N/A
Informal votes		699	6.2	N/A
Turnout		11,226	83.7	N/A

=== C Ward ===
2021 New South Wales local elections: C Ward
Party	Candidate	Votes	%	±%
Independent	1. Chris Homer; 2. Colin Gow (elected)	5,583	52.6	+52.6
Labor	1. Lou Stefanovski (elected); 2. Stuart Geddes	5,034	47.4	+47.4
Total formal votes		10,617	95.5	N/A
Informal votes		506	4.5	N/A
Turnout		11,123	83.7	N/A

=== D Ward ===
2021 New South Wales local elections: D Ward
Party	Candidate	Votes	%	±%
Independent	Jacqueline Graf (elected)	unopposed		
Labor	Rob Petreski (elected)	unopposed		
Registered electors		13,461		
