= Results of the 2024 New South Wales local elections in Northern Rivers =

2024 New South Wales local elections (Northern Rivers)
← 2021	14 September 2024	2028 →

This is a list of results for the 2024 New South Wales local elections in the Northern Rivers region.

The Northern Rivers has a total population of 311,295 and includes seven local government areas (LGAs), including Tweed Shire.

== Ballina ==
2024 Ballina Shire Council election
← 2021	14 September 2024	2028 →

All 9 seats on Ballina Shire Council (Note: Excluding the mayor, who is directly-elected.) 5 seats needed for a majority
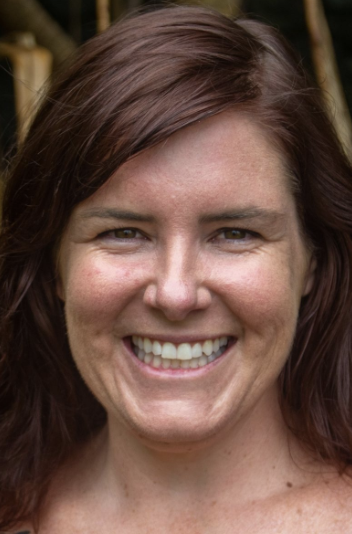

	First party	Second party
	SCT
Leader	Sharon Cadwallader	Kiri Dicker
Party	Cadwallader Team	Greens
Last election	3 seats	2 seats
Seats before	2	2
Seats won	3	3
Seat change	▲1	▲1
First preference vote	10,369	6,706
Percentage	40.28%	26.05%
Swing	▲11.68	▲9.55
	Third party	Fourth party
	IND
Leader	N/A	Andrew Broadley
Party	Independents	Labor
Last election	4 seats	0 seats
Seats before	5	0
Seats won	2	0
Seat change	▼3	Steady
First preference vote	5,307	1,950
Percentage	20.61%	7.57%
Swing	▼19.79	▼6.93
Largest party before election
Independents
Subsequent largest party
Sharon Cadwallader Team

Ballina Shire Council is composed of three three-member wards, as well as a directly elected mayor.

In August 2024, Sharon Cadwallader Team councillor Eva Ramsey split from the group to contest the election as a self-described "true independent". Two other Cadwallader Team councillors, Rod Bruem (A Ward) and Nigel Buchanan (C Ward), did not seek re-election. Independent B Ward councillor Jeff Johnson also did not recontest, endorsing candidates from the Greens (the party he was a member of until 2015).

=== Ballina results ===
2024 New South Wales local elections: Ballina
Party	Votes	%	Swing	Seats	Change
Sharon Cadwallader Team	10,369	40.28	+11.68	3	▲1
Greens	6,706	26.05	+9.55	3	▲2
Independents	5,307	20.61	−19.79	2	▼3
Labor	1,950	7.57	−6.93	0	Steady
Independent Labor	1,410	5.47	+5.47	1	Steady
Formal votes	25,742	88.49			
Informal votes	3,349	11.51			
Total	29,091			9	
Registered voters / turnout					

=== A Ward ===
2024 New South Wales local elections: A Ward
Party	Candidate	Votes	%	±%
Sharon Cadwallader Team	Damian Loone (elected 1)	1,989	23.6	+23.6
Greens	Erin Karsten (elected 2)	1,277	15.2	+3.6
Independent	Phil Meehan (elected 3)	1,217	14.5	−2.3
Labor	Maria Marshall	1,008	12.0	−1.6
Independent	Kevin Loughrey	964	11.4	+7.8
Sharon Cadwallader Team	Kay Oxley	819	9.7	+9,7
Independent	Stephen McCarthy	652	7.7	+7.7
Independent	Mark Paterson	495	5.9	+5.9
Total formal votes		8,421	86.3	
Informal votes		1,334	13.7	
Turnout		9,755	81.7	

=== B Ward ===
2024 New South Wales local elections: B Ward
Party	Candidate	Votes	%	±%
Sharon Cadwallader Team	Sharon Cadwallader	3,654	40.5	+4.0
Greens	Kiri Dicker (elected 1)	2,359	26.2	+9.9
Labor	Andrew Broadley	942	10.4	−5.0
Independent	Eva Ramsey (elected 3)	811	9.0	+4.9
Independent	Tom Berry	572	6.4	+6.4
Sharon Cadwallader Team	Michelle Bailey (elected 2)	374	4.2	+4.2
Greens	Alexander Sharkey	300	3.3	+3.3
Total formal votes		9,012	91.7	
Informal votes		820	8.3	
Turnout		9,832	81.0	

=== C Ward ===
2024 New South Wales local elections: C Ward
Party	Candidate	Votes	%	±%
Greens	Simon Chate (elected 1)	2,770	33.3	+11.8
Sharon Cadwallader Team	Simon Kinny (elected 2)	2,422	29.1	+29.1
Independent Labor	Therese Crollick (elected 3)	1,410	17.0	+2.4
Sharon Cadwallader Team	Shona Barrett	1,111	13.4	+13.4
Independent	Lois Cook	596	7.2	+7.2
Total formal votes		8,309	87.4	
Informal votes		1,195	12.6	
Turnout		9,504	82.4	

== Clarence Valley ==
2024 Clarence Valley Council election
← 2021	14 September 2024	2028 →

All 9 seats on Clarence Valley Council 5 seats needed for a majority
- Registered: 41,897
- Turnout: 83.7% (▼2.0)
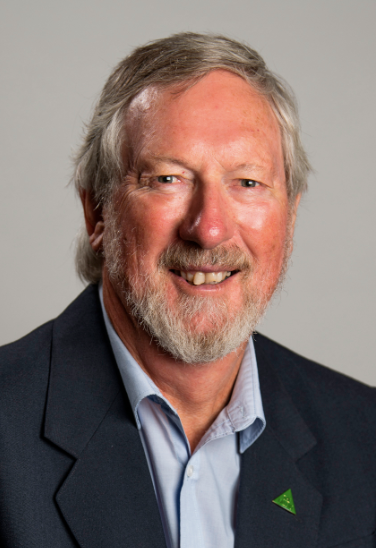
	First party	Second party	Third party
	IND	IND
Leader	N/A	N/A	Greg Clancy
Party	Independents	Ind. National	Greens
Last election	6 seats	2 seats	1 seat
Seats before	6	2	1
Seats won	6	2	1
Seat change	Steady	Steady	Steady
First preference vote	22,686	6,150	2,998
Percentage	71.3%	19.3%	9.4%
Swing			▲0.9
Largest party before election
Independents
Subsequent largest party
Independents

Clarence Valley Council is composed of nine councillors elected proportionally to a single ward.

=== Clarence Valley results ===
2024 New South Wales local elections: Clarence Valley
Party	Candidate	Votes	%	±%
Independent	Cristie Yager (elected)	4,773	15.0	
Independent National	Peter Johnstone (elected)	3,832	12.0	+4.8
Greens	Greg Clancy (elected)	2,998	9.4	+0.9
Independent	Ray Smith (elected)	2,486	7.8	
Independent	Shane Causley (elected)	2,432	7.6	
Independent National	Allison Whaites (elected)	2,318	7.3	−0.5
Independent	Lynne Cairns (elected)	2,057	6.5	
Independent	Debrah Novak (elected)	1,893	6.0	−5.8
Independent	Amanda Brien	1,556	4.9	
Independent	Karen Toms (elected)	1,435	4.5	−0.9
Independent	Andrew Baker	1,173	3.7	
Independent	Steve Pickering	1,144	3.6	−1.4
Independent	Melissa Hellwig	1,043	3.3	
Independent	James Allan	904	2.8	
Independent	Des Schroder	833	2.6	
Independent	Justin James	723	2.3	
Independent	Phillip Provest	234	0.7	
Total formal votes		31,834	90.8	−2.1
Informal votes		3,227	9.2	+2.1
Turnout		35,061	83.7	−2.0

== Kyogle ==
2024 Kyogle Council election
← 2021	14 September 2024	2028 →

All 9 seats on Kyogle Council 5 seats needed for a majority
	First party	Second party
	IND	IND
Party	Independents	Ind. Labor
Last election	9 seats	Did not contest
Seats before	9	0
Largest party before election
Independents
Subsequent largest party
TBD

Kyogle Council is composed of three three-member wards, totalling nine councillors.

=== Kyogle results ===
2024 New South Wales local elections: Kyogle
Party	Votes	%	Swing	Seats	Change
Independents					
Independent Labor					
Formal votes					
Informal votes					
Total					
Registered voters / turnout					

=== A Ward ===
2024 New South Wales local elections: A Ward
Party	Candidate	Votes	%	±%
Independent	Brett McNamara (elected)	557	31.6	
Independent	Kieran Somerville (elected)	446	25.3	
Independent	Janet Wilson (elected)	334	19.0	
Independent	Doug Layton	232	13.2	
Independent Labor	Naomi Worrall	193	11.0	
Total formal votes		1,762	91.6	
Informal votes		162	8.4	
Turnout		1,924	82.3	

=== B Ward ===
2024 New South Wales local elections: B Ward
Party	Candidate	Votes	%	±%
Independent	Olivia Taylor (elected)	632	34.2	
Independent	John Burley (elected)	452	24.5	+0.8
Independent	Robert Cullen (elected)	369	20.0	−10.5
Independent	Neil Summerville	270	14.6	
Independent	Glenn Robinson	123	6.7	
Total formal votes		1,846	93.5	
Informal votes		129	6.5	
Turnout		1,975	89.0	

=== C Ward ===
2024 New South Wales local elections: C Ward
Party	Candidate	Votes	%	±%
Independent	Danielle Mulholland (elected)	737	41.8	−7.0
Independent	Tom Cooper (elected)	397	22.5	−4.3
Independent	Robin Harley (elected)	224	12.7	
Independent	James Murray	207	11.7	−7.6
Independent	Earle Grundy	106	6.0	
Independent	Simon Dejoux	67	3.8	−1.3
Independent	Ian Murrell	25	1.4	
Total formal votes		1,763	93.4	
Informal votes		123	6.6	
Turnout		1,886	81.4	

== Lismore ==
2024 Lismore City Council election
← 2021	14 September 2024	2028 →

All 10 seats on Lismore City Council 6 seats needed for a majority
- Registered: 31,947
- Turnout: 83.8% (▼2.1)
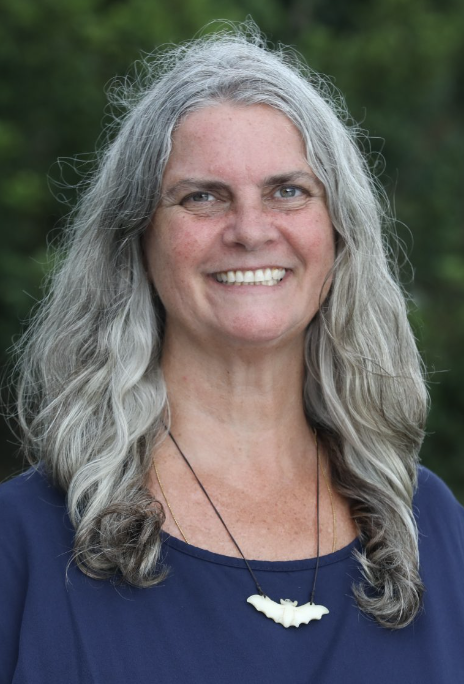

	First party	Second party	Third party
	SKFL
Leader	Steve Krieg	Vanessa; Grindon-Ekins	Harper; Dalton-Earls
Party	Steve Krieg	Greens	Labor
Last election	5 seats	2 seats	1 seat
Seats before	5	2	1
Seats won	5	2	2
Seat change	Steady	Steady	▲1
First preference vote	12,240	5,435	4,127
Percentage	48.7%	21.6%	16.4%
Swing	▼0.5	▲6.9	▲4.1
Largest party before election
Steve Krieg for Lismore
Subsequent largest party
Steve Krieg for Lismore

Lismore City Council is composed of ten councillors elected proportionally to a single ward, as well as a directly elected mayor.

Our Sustainable Future councillor Elly Bird announced in July 2024 that she would not seek re-election.

Greens councillor Vanessa Grindon-Ekins only contested the mayoral election and did not seek re-election as a councillor.

=== Lismore results ===
2024 New South Wales local elections: Lismore
Party	Candidate	Votes	%	±%
Steve Krieg for Lismore	1. Steve Krieg; 2. Jerilee Hall (elected); 3. Andrew Gordon (elected); 4. Electra Jensen (elected); 5. Andrew Bing (elected); 6. Gianpiero Battista (elected); 7. Nardia Pidcock; 8. Chris King; 9. Tara Cole; 10. Mitchell Dowse; 11. Richelle Weekes	12,240	48.7	−0.5
Greens	1. Adam Guise (elected); 2. Virginia Waters (elected); 3. Luke Robinson; 4. Shae Salmon; 5. Lindall Watson; 6. Binnie O'Dwyer	5,435	21.6	+6.9
Labor	1. Harper Dalton-Earls (elected); 2. Jasmine Knight-Smith (elected); 3. Kevin Bell; 4. Joy Knight-Smith; 5. Lewis Tayloe; 6. Glenys Ritchie; 7. William Harrison	4,127	16.4	+4.1
Independent	1. Big Rob (elected); 2. Shaen Springall; 3. Luke Tanttari; 4. Christopher Knight; 5. Stella Coleman	2,961	11.8	+4.3
Independent	John Jenkins	379	1.5	+1.5
Total formal votes		25,142	94.0	−1.8
Informal votes		1,616	6.0	+1.8
Turnout		26,758	83.8	−2.1

== Richmond Valley ==
=== Richmond Valley results ===
2024 New South Wales local elections: Richmond Valley
Party	Candidate	Votes	%	±%
Independent	1. Robert Mustow (elected mayor); 2. Stephen Morrissey (elected 1); 3. Sandra Duncan-Humphrys (elected 4); 4. Samuel Cornish (elected 5)	5,962	44.2	−13.1
A Time For Change	1. John Walker (elected 3); 2. Stuart George; 3. Kylie O'Reilly; 4. Scott Brereton; 5. Anne Toohey	2,819	20.9	
Richmond Valley Voices	1. Lyndall Murray (elected 2); 2. Bianca Rayner; 3. Simone Barker; 4. Samuel Allis; 5. Kylie Maunder; 6. Nathan Scully; 7. Hanabeth Luke	2,810	20.8	
Independent	1. Robert Hayes (elected 6); 2. Debra McGillan; 3. Rachel Arthur; 4. Tracey Knox; 5. Neale Genge; 6. Daniel Simpson	1,747	13.0	+1.4
Independent	William Drew	151	1.1	
Total formal votes		13,489	92.8	
Informal votes		1,044	7.2	
Turnout		14,533	86.9	

== Tweed ==
2024 Tweed Shire Council election
← 2021	14 September 2024	2028 →
- All 7 seats on Tweed Shire Council; 4 seats needed for a majority
- Turnout: 76.3%
Party	Vote %	Seats	+/–
Liberal	28.5	2	0
Community Independents	15.1	1	
Labor	14.5	1	0
Bring Back Balance	11.6	1	
Greens	10.5	1	0
Independent (Group I)	7.1	1	
This lists parties that won seats. See the complete results below.

Tweed Shire Council is composed of a single ward electing seven councillors.

=== Tweed results ===
2024 New South Wales local elections: Tweed
Party	Candidate	Votes	%	±%
Liberal	1. James Owen (elected 1); 2. Rhiannon Brinsmead (elected 4); 3. Thomas O'Connor; 4. Freda Wilding	14,262	28.5	+3.6
Community Independents	1. Chris Cherry (elected 2); 2. Lindy Smith; 3. Julie Boyd; 4. Trevor White	7,574	15.1	+2.8
Labor	1. Reece Byrnes (elected 3); 2. Judith Choat; 3. Russell Logan; 4. Marie-Antoinette Rogers	7,235	14.5	+2.9
Bring Back Balance	1. Kimberly Hone (elected 5); 2. Warren Polglase; 3. David Allen; 4. Hannah Easton	5,801	11.6	+2.7
Greens	1. Nola Firth (elected 6); 2. Mary-Jayne Johnston; 3. Hilary Green; 4. Julianne Sandison	5,252	10.5	+1.2
Independent (Group I)	1. Meredith Dennis (elected 7); 2. Jennifer Hayes; 3. Gillian Cooper; 4. Zachary Hoade; 5. Edna Gorton	3,530	7.1	+1.7
Turner 4 Tweed	1. Brady Turner; 2. Dirk Brouwer; 3. Peter Waver; 4. Susan Mole	2,502	5.0	
All 4 Tweed	1. Colin Usher; 2. Belinda Dinsey; 3. Jerami Grassi; 4. Peter Sibilant	2,265	4.5	
Pryceless Tweed	1. Pryce Allsop; 2. Bill Larkin; 3. Paul Pouloudis	856	1.7	−4.6
Independent (Group D)	1. Ned Wales; 2. Kim Lloyd	382	0.8	
Animal Justice	Susie Hearder	141	0.3	
Independent	Mitch Dobbie	98	0.2	
Independent	James McKenzie	69	0.1	0.0
Animal Justice	Nicola Stone	32	0.1	
Animal Justice	Sheraden Robins	15	0.3	
Animal Justice	Clelia Valdez	14	0.0	
Animal Justice	Cheryl Tompson	12	0.0	
Total formal votes		50,040	91.7	
Informal votes		4,549	8.3	
Turnout		54,589	76.3	
