= Results of the 2024 New South Wales local elections in Central West =

2024 New South Wales local elections (Central West)
- 14 September 2024

This is a list of results for the 2024 New South Wales local elections in the Central West region.

The Central West covers 12 local government areas (LGAs), including the Bathurst Region, with a total population of around 182,000 people.

== Bathurst ==
2024 Bathurst Regional Council election
- 14 September 2024

All 9 seats on Bathurst Regional Council 5 seats needed for a majority
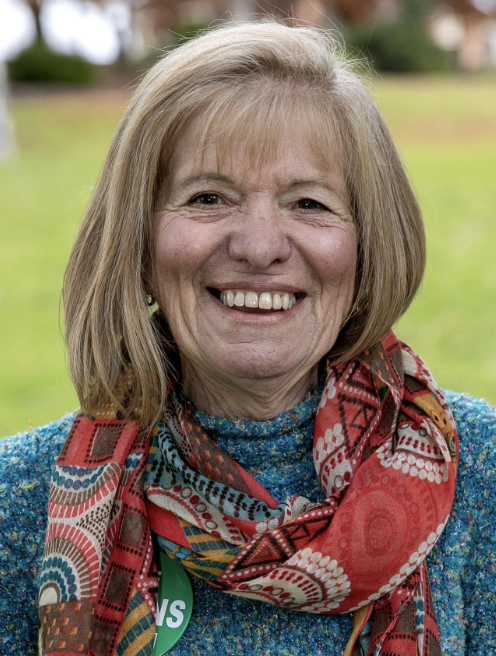
| | First party | Second party |
|---|---|---|
| | IND |
| Leader | N/A | Elaine West |
| Party | Independents (Note: Including local groups (not to be confused with locally-registered political parties).) | Greens |
| Last election | 9 seats | Did not contest |
| Seats before | 9 | 0 |
Largest party before election
Independents
Subsequent largest party
TBD

Bathurst Regional Council is composed of nine councillors elected proportionally to a single ward.

The Greens are the only registered party that is endorsing candidates. Nine local groups are also contesting.

=== Bathurst results ===
2024 New South Wales local elections: Bathurst
| Party | Candidate | Votes | % | ±% |
|---|---|---|---|---|
| Figuring It Out | 1. Sophie Wright (elected 1); 2. Natalie Cranston (elected 4); 3. Anne Balcomb; 4. Jeffery Muir; 5. Rowan Bracken; 6. Gavin Press; 7. Fiona Carlisle | 7,520 | 29.7 | |
| Balanced Bathurst | 1. Ben Fry (elected 2); 2. Jaclyn Underwood (elected 7); 3. Beau Yates; 4. Jasmyn Nankervis; 5. Kirralee Burke | 4,565 | 18.0 | −2.0 |
| Better Bathurst | 1. Jess Jennings (elected 3, resigned 2024); 2. Nick Packham (replaced Jennings on council); 3. Sharon Sewell; 4. Shona Kennedy; 5. Angus Thompson | 2,972 | 11.7 | +3.4 |
| Team Back Bathurst | 1. Robert (Stumpy) Taylor (elected 6); 2. Timothy Fagan; 3. Kelly Richardson; 4. James Connors; 5. Rebecca Mathie | 1,866 | 7.4 | −10.1 |
| Independent | Tony Gullifer (elected 5) | 1,844 | 7.3 | |
| Greens | 1. Elaine West (elected 9); 2. Elizabeth Barrett; 3. Cath Jackson; 4. Steph Luke; 5. Julie Kramer | 1,455 | 5.8 | |
| Bathurst United | 1. Warren Aubin (elected 8); 2. Lachlan Host; 3. Andrew Sherlock; 4. Teodora Todorova; 5. Warren McCaull | 1,292 | 5.1 | +0.5 |
| Responsible Financial Management | 1. Geoff Fry; 2. Juanita Kwok; 3. Margaret Hargans; 4. Michael McCormick; 5. Rob Quinn | 877 | 3.5 | +1.9 |
| Commitment To Our Community | 1. Graeme Hanger; 2. Luisa Simeonidis | 669 | 2.6 | −4.4 |
| Bathurst Matters | 1. Stuart Pearson; 2. Ingrid Pearson; 3. Pauline Graf; 4. Irene Hancock; 5. Timothy Herbert | 616 | 2.4 | −0.8 |
| Independent | Ian North | 547 | 2.2 | −7.8 |
| Independent | Liam O'Hara | 534 | 2.1 | |
| Together We Can Fix This | 1. Stuart Driver; 2. Larry Lewis | 306 | 1.2 | 0.0 |
| Independent | Marilyn Osborne | 168 | 0.7 | |
| Independent | Gordon Crisp | 78 | 0.3 | |
| Total formal votes | | 25,309 | 91.8 | −0.9 |
| Informal votes | | 2,255 | 8.2 | +0.9 |
| Turnout | | 27,564 | 87.1 | +0.8 |

== Blayney ==
2024 Blayney Shire Council election
- 14 September 2024

All 6 seats on Blayney Shire Council 4 seats needed for a majority
| | First party | Second party |
|---|---|---|
| | IND | IND |
| Party | Independents | Ind. National |
| Last election | 6 seats | 1 seat |
| Seats before | 6 | 1 |
Largest party before election
Independents
Subsequent largest party
TBD

=== Blayney results ===
2024 New South Wales local elections: Blayney
| Party | Candidate | Votes | % | ±% |
|---|---|---|---|---|
| Independent National | Bruce Reynolds (elected) | 1,074 | 23.6 | +9.7 |
| Independent | Michelle Pryse Jones (elected) | 629 | 13.8 | +0.6 |
| Independent | Karl Hutchings (elected) | 622 | 13.7 | |
| Independent | John Newstead (elected) | 556 | 12.2 | +3.1 |
| Independent | Craig Gosewisch (elected) | 485 | 10.7 | −1.6 |
| Independent | Rebecca Scott (elected) | 450 | 9.9 | |
| Independent | Iris Dorsett (elected) | 394 | 8.7 | +1.2 |
| Independent | Stephen Johnston | 264 | 5.8 | |
| Independent | Angus Norton | 73 | 1.6 | |
| Total formal votes | | 4,547 | 94.1 | |
| Informal votes | | 284 | 5.9 | |
| Turnout | | 4,831 | 86.8 | |

== Cabonne ==
2024 Cabonne Council election
- 14 September 2024

All 9 seats on Cabonne Council 5 seats needed for a majority
| | First party | Second party |
|---|---|---|
| | IND | IND |
| Party | Independents | Ind. National |
| Last election | 8 seats | 1 seat |
| Seats before | 8 | 1 |
Largest party before election
Independents
Subsequent largest party
TBD

=== Cabonne results ===
2024 New South Wales local elections: Cabonne
| Party | Candidate | Votes | % | ±% |
|---|---|---|---|---|
| Independent | Kevin Beatty (elected) | 2,077 | 26.9 | +3.2 |
| Independent National | Jamie Jones (elected) | 826 | 10.7 | +2.6 |
| Independent | Marlene Nash (elected) | 778 | 10.1 | −3.8 |
| Independent | Aaron Pearson (elected) | 711 | 9.2 | +4.4 |
| Independent | Peter Batten (elected) | 707 | 9.2 | +2.7 |
| Independent | Andrew Pull (elected) | 598 | 7.8 | −1.5 |
| Independent | Andrew Rawson (elected) | 587 | 7.6 | −0.6 |
| Independent | Kathryn O'Ryan (elected) | 592 | 7.7 | −0.7 |
| Independent | Jennifer Weaver (elected) | 465 | 6.0 | +2.8 |
| Independent | Guin Dickie | 379 | 4.9 | |
| Total formal votes | | 7,720 | 90.7 | |
| Informal votes | | 796 | 9.3 | |
| Turnout | | 8,516 | 83.4 | |

== Cowra ==
2024 Cowra Shire Council election
- 14 September 2024

All 9 seats on Cowra Shire Council 5 seats needed for a majority
- Turnout: 0.00% (▼85.0%)
| | First party | Second party | Third party |
|---|---|---|---|
| | IND | IND | IND |
| Party | Independents | Ind. National | Ind. Labor |
| Last election | 7 seats | 1 seat | 1 seat |
| Seats before | 7 | 1 | 1 |
| Seats won | 6 | 1 | 1 |
| Seat change | ▼1 | Steady | Steady |
| First preference vote | Unopposed | Unopposed | Unopposed |
Largest party before election
Independents
Subsequent largest party
Independents

=== Cowra results ===
2024 New South Wales local elections: Cowra
| Party | Candidate | Votes | % | ±% |
|---|---|---|---|---|
| Independent | Paul Robert Smith (elected) | unopposed | | |
| Independent | Cheryl Downing (elected) | unopposed | | |
| Independent | Tony Horton (elected) | unopposed | | |
| Independent Labor | Erin Watt (elected) | unopposed | | |
| Independent | Cheryl Speechley (elected) | unopposed | | |
| Independent National | Ruth Fagan (elected) | unopposed | | |
| Independent | Peter Wright (elected) | unopposed | | |
| Independent | Nikki Kiss (elected) | unopposed | | |
| Registered electors | | | | |

== Forbes ==
2024 Forbes Shire Council election
- 14 September 2024

All 9 seats on Forbes Shire Council 5 seats needed for a majority
| | First party | Second party |
|---|---|---|
| | IND | IND |
| Party | Independents | Ind. National |
| Last election | 8 seats | 1 seat |
| Seats before | 8 | 1 |
Largest party before election
Independents
Subsequent largest party
TBD

Forbes Shire Council is composed of nine councillors elected proportionally to a single ward.

=== Forbes results ===
2024 New South Wales local elections: Forbes
| Party | Candidate | Votes | % | ±% |
|---|---|---|---|---|
| Independent National | Phyllis Miller (elected) | 1,828 | 33.7 | −2.9 |
| Independent | Steve Karaitiana (elected) | 650 | 12.0 | +1.7 |
| Independent | Aidan Clarke (elected) | 635 | 11.7 | +3.7 |
| Independent | Jenny Webb (elected) | 507 | 9.4 | −0.7 |
| Independent | Chris Roylance (elected) | 382 | 7.1 | +2.4 |
| Independent | Margaret Duggan (elected) | 373 | 6.9 | −1.2 |
| Independent | Brian Mattiske (elected) | 301 | 5.6 | +2.5 |
| Independent | Sarahlee Sweeney (elected) | 283 | 5.2 | |
| Independent | Michele Herbert (elected) | 243 | 4.5 | −2.0 |
| Independent | James Whalan | 216 | 4.0 | |
| Total formal votes | | 5,418 | 95.3 | −1.8 |
| Informal votes | | 265 | 4.7 | +1.8 |
| Turnout | | 5,683 | 81.6 | −1.5 |

== Lachlan ==
2024 Lachlan Shire Council election
- 14 September 2024

All 10 seats on Lachlan Shire Council 6 seats needed for a majority
| | First party |
|---|---|
| | IND |
| Party | Independents |
| Last election | 10 seats |
| Seats before | 10 |
Largest party before election
Independents
Subsequent largest party
TBD

=== Lachlan results ===
2024 New South Wales local elections: Lachlan
| Party | Votes | % | Swing | Seats | Change |
|---|---|---|---|---|---|
| Independent | | | | | |
| Formal votes | | | | | |
| Informal votes | | | | | |
| Total | | | | 10 | |
| Registered voters / turnout | | | | | |

=== A Ward ===
2024 New South Wales local elections: A Ward
| Party | Candidate | Votes | % | ±% |
|---|---|---|---|---|
| Independent | John Medcalf (elected) | unopposed | | |
| Independent | Megan Mortimer (elected) | unopposed | | |
| Registered electors | | | | |

=== B Ward ===
2024 New South Wales local elections: B Ward
| Party | Candidate | Votes | % | ±% |
|---|---|---|---|---|
| Independent | Melissa Blewitt (elected) | unopposed | | |
| Independent | Melissa Rees (elected) | unopposed | | |
| Registered electors | | | | |

=== C Ward ===
2024 New South Wales local elections: C Ward
| Party | Candidate | Votes | % | ±% |
|---|---|---|---|---|
| Independent | Juanita Wighton (elected) | 269 | 52.3 | |
| Independent | Peter Harris (elected) | 192 | 37.8 | |
| Independent | Thomas Macartney | 53 | 10.3 | |
| Total formal votes | | 514 | 97.7 | |
| Informal votes | | 12 | 2.3 | |
| Turnout | | 526 | 63.0 | |

=== D Ward ===
2024 New South Wales local elections: D Ward
| Party | Candidate | Votes | % | ±% |
|---|---|---|---|---|
| Independent | Robyn Turner (elected) | unopposed | | |
| Independent | Dennis Brady (elected) | unopposed | | |
| Registered electors | | | | |

=== E Ward ===
2024 New South Wales local elections: E Ward
| Party | Candidate | Votes | % | ±% |
|---|---|---|---|---|
| Independent | Paul Phillips (elected) | unopposed | | |
| Registered electors | | | | |

== Lithgow ==
2024 Lithgow City Council election
- 14 September 2024

All 9 seats on Lithgow City Council 5 seats needed for a majority
| | First party |
|---|---|
| | IND |
| Party | Independents |
| Last election | 9 seats |
| Seats before | 9 |
Largest party before election
Independents
Subsequent largest party
TBD

=== Lithgow results ===
2024 New South Wales local elections: Lithgow
| Party | Candidate | Votes | % | ±% |
|---|---|---|---|---|
| Independent | 1. Martin Ticehurst (elected 1); 2. Elizabeth Fredericks (elected 8); 3. Ian Wamijo; 4. Greg Noble; 5. Rod Gurney | 2,812 | 21.6 | |
| Independent | 1. Eric Mahony (elected 2); 2. Ray Smith (elected 6); 3. Dennis Limbert; 4. Diane Plaza; 5. Lucille Hoy | 2,214 | 17.0 | |
| Independent | 1. Darryl Goodwin (elected 4); 2. Josh Howarth; 3. Johan Nilsson; 4. Greg Peveril-Guest; 5. Charlie Healey; 6. Melanie Palmer | 1,901 | 14.6 | −4.5 |
| Independent | 1. Cass Coleman (elected 3); 2. Jon Cronin; 3. Tenille Evans; 4. Kylie Holmes; 5. Mark McAuley | 1,833 | 14.1 | −2.4 |
| Independent | 1. Maree Statham (elected 5); 2. Col O'Connor; 3. Stuart McGhie; 4. Almudena Bryce; 5. Dianne O'Sullivan; 6. Catherine Rookyard; 7. David Adams | 1,667 | 12.8 | −29.3 |
| Independent | 1. Steven Ring (elected 7); 2. Matthew Conlon; 3. Natalie Foodey; 4. Louis Sander; 5. Michael Koleda | 923 | 7.1 | +2.2 |
| Independent | 1. Tommy Evangelidis (elected 9); 2. Macgregor Ross; 3. Marilyn Boundy; 4. Jacob Bray; 5. Karen Seita | 719 | 5.5 | |
| Independent | Stephen Lesslie | 396 | 3.0 | −4.5 |
| Independent | 1. Kyle Rollinson; 2. Matthew Palmer; 3. Scott Davies; 4. Daniel Mortell; 5. Samual Palmer | 327 | 2.5 | |
| Independent | Ann Thompson | 159 | 1.2 | |
| Independent | Will Hanby | 67 | 0.5 | |
| Total formal votes | | 13,018 | 93.8 | |
| Informal votes | | 856 | 6.2 | |
| Turnout | | 13,874 | 87.3 | |

== Mid-Western ==
2024 Mid-Western Regional Council election
- 14 September 2024

All 9 seats on Mid-Western Regional Council 5 seats needed for a majority

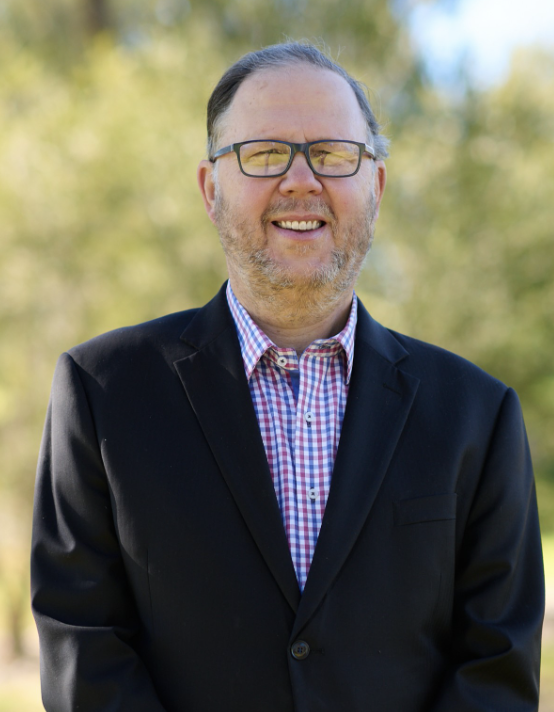
| | First party | Second party | Third party |
|---|---|---|---|
| | IND |
| Leader | N/A | Sharelle Fellows | Richard Holz |
| Party | Independents | Labor | Greens |
| Last election | 9 seats | Did not contest | Did not contest |
| Seats before | 9 | 0 | 0 |
Largest party before election
Independents
Subsequent largest party
TBD

Mid-Western Regional Council is composed of nine councillors elected proportionally to a single ward. Labor and the Greens are endorsing candidates, having not done so in 2021.

=== Mid-Western results ===
2024 New South Wales local elections: Mid-Western
| Party | Candidate | Votes | % | ±% |
|---|---|---|---|---|
| Independent | Des Kennedy (elected 1) | 1,994 | 13.0 | |
| Labor | 1. Sharelle Fellows (elected 2); 2. Rodney Pryor; 3. Janet Duffy; 4. Peter Clarke; 5. Simon Davies | 1,747 | 11.3 | |
| Independent | 1. Katie Dicker (elected 4); 2. Sally Mayberry; 3. Katherine McDonald; 4. Rachel McKeown; 5. Shahna Smith | 1,310 | 8.5 | +1.9 |
| Independent | 1. James Thompson (elected 6); 2. Anthony (Buzzy) Westaway; 3. Matthew Purtle; 4. Robyn Jones; 5. Jack Rayner; 6. Graham Chadwick | 1,262 | 8.2 | −5.1 |
| Independent | 1. Alex Karavas (elected 5); 2. Samuel Kiho; 3. Sharon Traemer; 4. Angus Buckley; 5. Liam Jeffery | 1,136 | 7.4 | 0.0 |
| Independent | 1. Peter Shelley (elected 8); 2. James Johnson; 3. Alannah Rankin; 4. Helen Fuller; 5. Craig Parsons; 6. Doreen Shelley | 1,103 | 7.2 | −2.3 |
| Independent | 1. Robert Palmer (elected 7); 2. Peter Crawley; 3. Jackson Lambkin; 4. Abby Lynch; 5. Nathan Henwood | 1,062 | 6.9 | =3.3 |
| Independent | Elwyn Lang (elected 3) | 1,023 | 6.6 | |
| Independent | 1. Marcus Cornish (elected 9); 2. Adrienne Morrison; 3. Stacey Carter; 4. Margaret Cornish; 5. Gerard Morrison | 1,022 | 6.6 | |
| Greens | 1. Richard Holz; 2. Janet Walk; 3. Bruce Christie; 4. Anthea Nicholls; 5. Chris Pavich | 941 | 6.1 | |
| Independent | 1. Col Doyle; 2. Matt Eltis; 3. Daniel Lewis; 4. Heather Rushton; 5. Brendan Boyd | 793 | 5.2 | |
| Independent | 1. Kim Edwards; 2. Rebecca Saunders; 3. David McLennan; 4. Jennifer MacNaughton; 5. Yash Godbole | 722 | 4.7 | |
| Independent | 1. Grant Gjessing; 2. Alison Broinowski; 3. Brendon Cocks; 4. James Williams; 5. Terri Gricks | 698 | 4.5 | |
| Independent | Michael John Sweeney | 278 | 1.8 | |
| Independent | Simon Staines | 133 | 0.9 | +0.3 |
| Independent National | Sandy Walker | 119 | 0.8 | |
| Independent | Matthew Cooper | 56 | 0.4 | |
| Total formal votes | | 15,399 | 92.3 | |
| Informal votes | | 1,279 | 7.7 | |
| Turnout | | 16,678 | 86.4 | |

== Oberon ==
2024 Oberon Council election
- 14 September 2024

All 9 seats on Lachlan Shire Council 5 seats needed for a majority
| | First party |
|---|---|
| | IND |
| Party | Independents |
| Last election | 9 seats |
| Seats before | 9 |
Largest party before election
Independents
Subsequent largest party
TBD

=== Oberon results ===
2024 New South Wales local elections: Oberon
| Party | Candidate | Votes | % | ±% |
|---|---|---|---|---|
| Independent | 1. Francis O'Connor (elected); 2. Jill O'Grady (elected); 3. Robert Coulter (Ind. Nat); 4. Michael Cyre; 5. Robert Lee; 6. Brenda Lyon; 7. Tatiana Coulter; 8. Raymond Fitzpatrick; 9. Robert Snoch | 1,029 | 31.0 | |
| Independent | Clive McCarthy (elected) | 420 | 12.7 | −0.8 |
| Independent | Katie Graham (elected) | 382 | 11.5 | +2.1 |
| Independent | Andrew McKibbin (elected) | 328 | 9.9 | +2.2 |
| Independent | Helen Hayden (elected) | 321 | 9.7 | +4.9 |
| Independent | Lauren Trembath (elected) | 259 | 7.8 | +1.0 |
| Independent | Anthony Alevras (elected) | 246 | 7.4 | |
| Independent | Ian Tucker (elected) | 186 | 5.6 | −5.4 |
| Independent | Irene Bishop | 85 | 2.6 | |
| Independent | William Memory | 62 | 1.9 | |
| Total formal votes | | 3,318 | 93.4 | |
| Informal votes | | 236 | 6.6 | |
| Turnout | | 3,554 | 88.2 | |

== Orange ==
2024 Orange City Council election
- 14 September 2024

All 11 seats on Orange City Council 6 seats needed for a majority
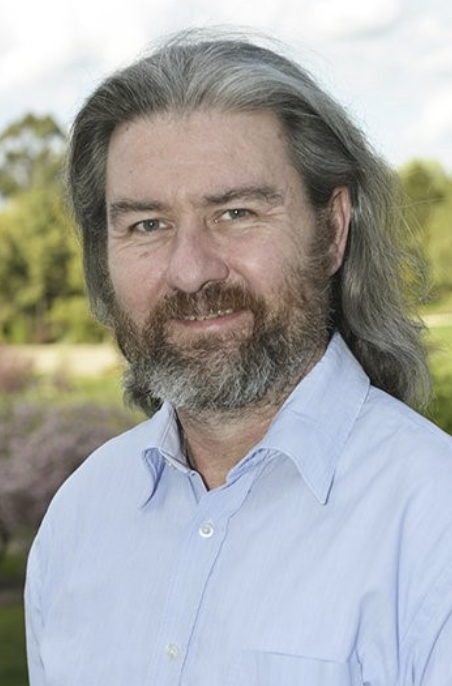

| | First party | Second party |
|---|---|---|
| | IND |
| Leader | N/A | David Mallard |
| Party | Independents | Greens |
| Last election | 9 seats | 1 seat |
| Seats before | 9 | 1 |
| Seats won | 9 | 1 |
| Seat change | Steady | Steady |
| | Third party | Fourth party |
| | | ORRA |
| Leader | Jeff Whitton | Rances Kinghorne |
| Party | Labor | Residents & Ratepayers |
| Last election | Did not contest | 1 seat |
| Seats before | 1 | 1 |
| Seats won | 1 | 1 |
| Seat change | Steady | Steady |
Largest party before election
Independents
Subsequent largest party
Independents

Orange City Council is composed of 11 councillors elected proportionally to a single ward.

Councillor Glenn Floyd left the Shooters, Fishers and Farmers Party (SFFP) on 13 December 2022 after comments made by party leader Robert Borsak. As a result, SFFP did not recontest Orange in 2024.

Independent Labor councillor Jeff Whitton led an endorsed Labor Party ticket. Labor last endorsed candidates for Orange City Council in 2004.

=== Orange results ===
2024 New South Wales local elections: Orange
| Party | Candidate | Votes | % | ±% |
|---|---|---|---|---|
| Independent (Group C) | 1. Tony Mileto (elected mayor); 2. Marea Ruddy (elected 2); 3. Jamie Stedman (elected 9); 4. Bernadette Wood; 5. Tony Pearson; 6. Brett Hazzard | 4,006 | 16.7 | +0.7 |
| Independent (Group B) | 1. Kevin Duffy (elected 1); 2. Graeme Judge (elected 11); 3. Fleur Vardanega; 4. Darren Johnson; 5. Richard Clifford; 6. Bradley Tyack | 3,651 | 15.2 | +5.3 |
| Independent (Group F) | 1. Tammy Greenhalgh (elected 4); 2. Craig Harvey; 3. Paris Papell; 4. Holly Whitaker; 5. Jason Lyne; 6. Melissa Hamling | 2,917 | 12.2 | −1.1 |
| Independent (Group J) | 1. Steven Peterson (elected 3); 2. Warwick Baines; 3. Theodore Crane; 4. Andrew Greig; 5. Michael O'Mara; 6. Nathan Sutherland; 7. Anthony Solari | 2,853 | 11.9 | +1.5 |
| Labor | 1. Jeff Whitton (elected 5); 2. Heather Dunn; 3. Addam Parish; 4. Jack Carden; 5. Charles Ginty; 6. Julie Cunningham | 2,049 | 8.6 | +1.1 |
| Orange Residents and Ratepayers Association (Group K) | 1. Frances Kinghorne (elected 6); 2. Paula Townsend; 3. Eunice Adetifa; 4. Salvatore Sciuto; 5. Thomas McCann; 6. Patrick Raftery | 1,914 | 8.0 | +2.1 |
| Independent (Group G) | 1. Gerald Power (elected 7); 2. Tabitha McBurney; 3. Ben Benton; 4. Glenda Bell; 5. Elizabeth Seccombe; 6. Michael Seccombe | 1,844 | 7.7 | +4.1 |
| Independent (Group D) | 1. Melanie McDonell (elected 8); 2. Ken Freedman; 3. Ben Bartlett; 4. Chris Stanger; 5. Granton Smith; 6. Kate Curtin | 1,786 | 7.5 | −0.4 |
| Greens | 1. David Mallard (elected 10); 2. Sue Clarke; 3. Jenny Pratten; 4. Ben Parker; 5. Liz Murrell; 6. Haidee Edwards | 1,560 | 6.5 | −2.7 |
| Independent (Group A) | 1. Glenn Floyd; 2. Gary Sanders; 3. Kristen Hopcraft; 4. Brock Anderson; 5. William Moran; 6. Peter Whelan | 733 | 3.1 | −9.2 |
| Independent (Group H) | 1. James Newman; 2. Jason Wright; 3. Beverley Williams; 4. Annette Steele; 5. Jannene Geoghegan; 6. Azra Nurkic | 640 | 2.7 | |
| Total formal votes | | 23,953 | 92.3 | |
| Informal votes | | 2,000 | 7.7 | |
| Turnout | | 25,953 | 84.3 | |

== Parkes ==
2024 Parkes Shire Council election
- 14 September 2024

All 10 seats on Parkes Shire Council 6 seats needed for a majority
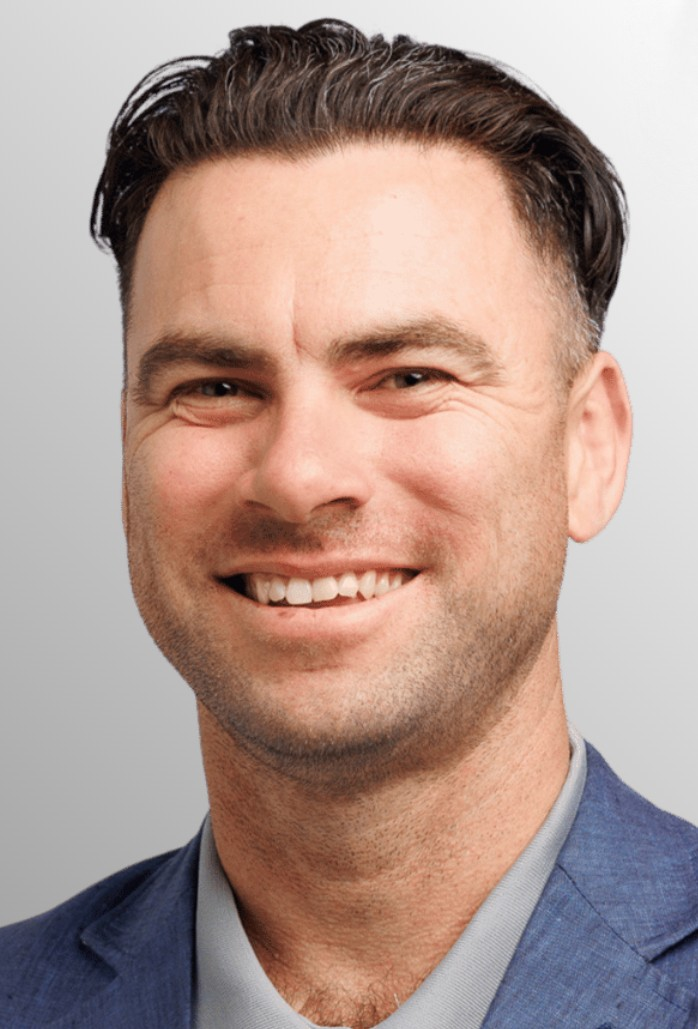
| | First party | Second party | Third party |
|---|---|---|---|
| | IND | IND |
| Leader | N/A | N/A | Samuel Jordan |
| Party | Independents | Ind. National | Libertarian |
| Last election | 9 seats | 1 seat | Did not contest |
| Seats before | 9 | 1 | 0 |
Largest party before election
Independents
Subsequent largest party
Independents

Parkes Shire Council is composed of a single ward electing ten members.

=== Parkes results ===
2024 New South Wales local elections: Parkes
| Party | Candidate | Votes | % | ±% |
|---|---|---|---|---|
| Independent | 1. Matthew Scherer; 2. Andrew Wilkinson; 3. Ben Drabsch; 4. Jeff Powell; 5. Michael White; 6. Mick Ramsay | | | |
| Independent | 1. Glenn Wilson; 2. Daniel Weber; 3. Erik Snyman; 4. Rob Bradley; 5. Tim Hall-Matthews; 6. Ray Johnson; 7. Nick Lees; 8. Justin Hill | | | |
| Independent | Marg Applebee | | | |
| Independent | Neil Hamilton | | | |
| Independent | Douglas Pout | | | |
| Libertarian | Samuel Jordan | | | |
| Independent | Alan Flavel | | | |
| Independent National | Ken Keith | | | |
| Independent | Kenny McGrath | | | |
| Independent | Graeme Hunter | | | |
| Independent | Louise O'Leary | | | |
| Independent National | Darren Stevenson | | | |
| Independent | Hamish Ritchie | | | |
| Independent | Irene Ridgeway | | | |
| Independent | Anthony Barrott | | | |
| Independent | Joy Paddison | | | |
| Independent | Jacob Cass | | | |
| Independent | Bill Jayet | | | |
| Independent | Neil Westcott | | | |
| Independent | George Pratt | | | |
| Total formal votes | | | | |
| Informal votes | | | | |
| Turnout | | | | |

== Weddin ==
2024 Weddin Shire Council election
- 14 September 2024

All 9 seats on Weddin Shire Council 5 seats needed for a majority
| | First party | Second party |
|---|---|---|
| | IND | IND |
| Party | Independents | Ind. Labor |
| Last election | 9 seats | Did not contest |
| Seats before | 9 | 0 |
Largest party before election
Independents
Subsequent largest party
TBD

=== Weddin results ===
2024 New South Wales local elections: Weddin
| Party | Candidate | Votes | % | ±% |
|---|---|---|---|---|
| Independent | Paul Best (elected) | 459 | 20.2 | +13.4 |
| Independent Labor | John Niven (elected) | 400 | 17.6 | |
| Independent | Michael Neill (elected) | 197 | 8.7 | |
| Independent | Simon Rolls (elected) | 230 | 10.1 | |
| Independent | Chad White (elected) | 156 | 6.9 | −1.6 |
| Independent | Colleen Gorman (elected) | 150 | 6.6 | |
| Independent | Jan Partlett (elected) | 119 | 5.2 | |
| Independent | Wezley Makin (elected) | 118 | 5.2 | |
| Independent | Gordon Gam | 90 | 4.0 | |
| Independent | Jeanne Montgomery (elected) | 81 | 3.6 | |
| Independent | Michelle Cook | 71 | 3.1 | −2.6 |
| Independent | Glenda Howell | 57 | 2.5 | +0.1 |
| Independent | Julie Gilmore | 49 | 2.2 | |
| Independent | Phillip Moore | 46 | 2.0 | |
| Independent | Warwick Frame | 46 | 2.0 | +0.9 |
| Total formal votes | | 2,269 | 95.5 | |
| Informal votes | | 106 | 4.5 | |
| Turnout | | 2,375 | 85.2 | |
