= Shoalhaven Independents Group =

- Abbreviation: SIG
- Leader: Patricia White
- Founder: Greg Watson
- Headquarters: Vincentia, New South Wales, Australia
- Ideology: Localism; Conservative
- Political position: Right-wing
- Slogan: "Community Honesty Experience Integrity"
- Shoalhaven City Council: 4 / 13

The Shoalhaven Independents Group (SIG), also known simply as the Shoalhaven Independents, is an Australian political party that contests local government elections for Shoalhaven City Council in New South Wales. The party is registered with the New South Wales Electoral Commission (NSWEC).

== History ==
Shoalhaven Independents has existed since at least 2004, and has been led by Greg Watson − who was elected mayor in 1999 − for most of that time. The party won a majority at the 2004 local elections, with Watson re-elected mayor and six SIG candidates elected as councillors. He was defeated in 2008 by Paul Green, and unsuccessfully contested the 2012 and 2016 elections as well.

At the 2021 local elections, SIG won the largest number of councillors − 4 out of 12 − but fell short of winning a plurality as incumbent Greens mayor Amanda Findley was re-elected. The party had endorsed three candidates for the mayoral election, including former Team Gash councillor Patricia White.

Watson retired at the 2024 local elections after 50 years as a councillor, with White taking over as SIG leader. The party pledged to re-introduce Australia Day Awards and citizenship ceremonies on 26 January if elected to a majority.

== Controversies ==
=== Donations ===
Following the 2004 election, The Sydney Morning Herald reported that SIG's victory was "helped by thousands of dollars of developers' money that paid for a television, radio and print election campaign" larger than that of any other candidate. The donations to SIG for the 2004 election totalled $91,017.

In 2008, it was found that SIG's funding declaration failed to disclose four years' worth of political donations, including Watson's unsuccessful campaign for the electorate of South Coast at the 2003 state election.
