= Results of the 2021 New South Wales local elections in Northern Rivers =

This is a list of results for the 2021 New South Wales local elections in the Northern Rivers region.

== Ballina ==
2021 New South Wales local elections: Ballina
Party	Votes	%	Swing	Seats	Change
Independent	1,0195	40.4		4	▲1
Sharon Cadwallader Team	7,227	28.6		3	
Greens	4,173	16.5	+16.5	2	▲2
Labor	3,676	14.5	+14.5	0	Steady
Formal votes	25,271	90.94			
Informal votes	2,517	9.06			
Total	27,788	100.00		9	
Registered voters / turnout	32,830	84.64			

=== A Ward ===
2021 New South Wales local elections: A Ward
Party	Candidate	Votes	%	±%
Sharon Cadwallader Team	Rod Bruem (elected)	1,395	17.6	
Independent	Steve McCarthy (elected)	1,371	17.3	
Independent	Phil Meehan (elected)	1,337	16.8	
Labor	Col Riches	1,079	13.6	
Greens	Jason Shrieves	919	11.6	
Independent	Rick Hyde	818	10.3	
Independent	Lenkunyar Roberts	335	4.2	
Sharon Cadwallader Team	Simon Kinny	327	4.1	
Independent	Kevin Loughrey	290	3.6	
Independent	John Bout	76	1.0	
Total formal votes		7,947	89.5	
Informal votes		933	10.5	
Turnout			82.4	

=== B Ward ===
2021 New South Wales local elections: B Ward
Party	Candidate	Votes	%	±%
Sharon Cadwallader Team	Sharon Cadwallader	3,321	36.5	
Independent	Jeff Johnson (elected)	2,172	23.9	
Greens	Kiri Dicker (elected)	1,485	16.3	
Labor	Keith Williams	1,215	13.4	(Note: Compared to results as an Independent Labor candidate at the 2016 election.)
Sharon Cadwallader Team	Eva Ramsey (elected)	371	4.1	
Independent	Wendy Wishart	342	3.8	
Labor	Leonie Price	181	2.0	
Total formal votes		9,087	92.4	
Informal votes		747	7.6	
Turnout			85.3	

=== C Ward ===
2021 New South Wales local elections: C Ward
Party	Candidate	Votes	%	±%
Independent	Eoin Johnston (elected)	3,454	41.9	
Greens	Simon Chate (elected)	1,769	21.5	
Sharon Cadwallader Team	Nigel Buchanan (elected)	1,242	15.1	
Labor	Therese Crollick	1,201	14.6	
Sharon Cadwallader Team	Stephen Bocking	571	6.9	
Total formal votes		8,237	90.8	
Informal votes		837	9.2	
Turnout			86.3	

== Byron ==
Elected councillor	Party
Duncan Dey	Greens
Cate Coorey	Independent (Group B)
Mark Swivel	Mark Swivel Team
Sama Balson	Byron Independents
Asren Pugh	Labor
Sarah Ndiaye	Greens
Peter Westheimer	Byron Independents
Alan Hunter	Byron Alliance

2021 New South Wales local elections: Byron
Party	Candidate	Votes	%	±%
Greens		3,755	21.2	−21.7
Byron Independents		3,627	20.5	
Mark Swivel Team		2,969	16.7	
Independent (Group B)		2,633	14.8	
Labor		2,196	12.4	
Byron Alliance		1,235	7.0	
Byron Shire Action Group		975	5.5	
Independent	John Anderson	345	1.9	
Total formal votes		17,735	94.6	
Informal votes		1,021	5.4	
Turnout		18,756	73.8	
Party total seats			Seats	±
Independent			5	▲3
Greens			2	▼1
Labor			1	▼1

- Incumbent councillor Basil Cameron (Our Sustainable Future) did not seek re-election

== Clarence Valley ==
2021 New South Wales local elections: Clarence Valley
Party	Candidate	Votes	%	±%
Independent	Jeff Smith (elected)	6,022	19.6	
Independent	Debrah Novak (elected)	3,622	11.8	
Independent	Ian Tiley (elected)	2,637	8.6	
Independent National	Allison Whaites (elected)	2,403	7.8	
Independent	Bill Day (elected)	2,039	6.7	
Greens	Greg Clancy (elected)	2,592	8.5	
Independent National	Peter Johnstone (elected)	2,212	7.2	
Independent	Karen Toms (elected)	1,658	5.4	
Independent	Steve Pickering (elected)	1,536	5.0	
Independent Labor	Peter Ellem	1,494	4.9	
Independent	Ash Gibbons	1,189	3.9	
Independent	Pete Hanson	1,189	3.9	
Independent National	Donald Scott	702	2.3	
Independent	Phil Belletty	661	2.2	
Independent	Jeffrey Fuller	357	1.2	
Independent	Warren Lang	348	1.1	
Total formal votes		30,661	92.9	
Informal votes		2,358	7.1	
Turnout			85.7	
Party total votes
Independent		23,850	77.8	
Independent National		5,317	17.3	
Independent Labor		1,494	4.9	
Party total seats			Seats	±
Independent			7	Steady
Independent National			2	▲1
Independent Labor			0	▼1

== Kyogle ==
2021 New South Wales local elections: Kyogle
Party	Votes	%	Swing	Seats	Change
Independent	3,419	100.0	+0.0	9	Steady
Formal votes	3,419	95.2			
Informal votes	172	4.8			
Total	3,591	100.0			
Registered voters / turnout	6,688	53.7			

=== A Ward ===
2021 New South Wales local elections: A Ward
Party	Candidate	Votes	%	±%
Independent	Hayden Doolan (elected)	unopposed		
Independent	Kylie Thomas (elected)	unopposed		
Independent	Janet Wilson (elected)	unopposed		
Registered electors		2,251		

=== B Ward ===
2021 New South Wales local elections: B Ward
Party	Candidate	Votes	%	±%
Independent	Robert Cullen (elected)	534	30.5	
Independent	John Burley (elected)	415	23.7	
Independent	Maggie May (elected)	392	22.4	
Independent	Vickie Steward	210	12.0	
Independent	Bob Dwyer	202	11.5	
Total formal votes		1,753	95.1	
Informal votes		90	4.9	
Turnout		1,843	83.9	

=== C Ward ===
2021 New South Wales local elections: C Ward
Party	Candidate	Votes	%	±%
Independent	Danielle Mulholland (elected)	813	48.8	
Independent	Tom Cooper (elected)	446	26.8	
Independent	James Murray (elected)	322	19.3	
Independent	Simon Dejoux	85	5.1	
Total formal votes		1,666	95.3	
Informal votes		82	4.7	
Turnout		1,748	78.0	

== Lismore ==
Elected councillor	Party
Peter Colby	Steve Krieg
Jeri Hall	Steve Krieg
Andrew Gordon	Steve Krieg
Electra Jensen	Steve Krieg
Andrew Bing	Steve Krieg
Vanessa Grindon-Ekins	Greens
Adam Guise	Greens
Darlene Cook	Labor
Elly Bird	OSF
Big Rob	Independent

2021 New South Wales local elections: Lismore
Party	Candidate	Votes	%	±%
	Steve Krieg for Lismore	12,766	49.2	+49.2
	Greens	3,820	14.7	+0.8
	Labor	3,195	12.3	−10.3
	Our Sustainable Future	2,769	10.7	+0.0
	Independent	1,948	7.5	
	Independent Lismore	797	3.1	
	Animal Justice	653	2.5	+2.5
Total formal votes		25,948	95.8	
Informal votes		1,140	4.2	
Turnout		27,088	85.9	

== Richmond Valley ==
Elected councillor	Party
Steve Morrissey	Independent (Group B)
Sam Cornish	Independent (Group B)
Sandra Humphrys	Independent (Group B)
Debra McGillan	Independent (Group B)
Patrick Deegan	Labor
Robert Hayes	Independent (Group D)

2021 New South Wales local elections: Richmond Valley
Party	Candidate	Votes	%	±%
Independent (Robert Mustow's Group B)		7,346	57.6	
Labor		1,769	13.9	
Independent (Group D)		1,457	11.4	
Independent (Group A)		1,281	10.0	
Independent (Group C)		776	6.1	
Independent	Robyn Kapeen	127	1.0	
Total formal votes		12,756	90.7	
Informal votes		1,313	9.3	
Turnout		14,069	85.4	
