= Results of the 2024 New South Wales local elections in Illawarra =

2024 New South Wales local elections (Illawarra)
← 2021	14 September 2024	2028 →

This is a list of results for the 2024 New South Wales local elections in the Illawarra region.

Illawarra covers five local government areas (LGAs), including the City of Wollongong.

== Kiama ==
2024 Kiama Council election
← 2021	14 September 2024	2028 →

All 9 seats on Kiama Council 5 seats needed for a majority
Largest party before election
No overall control
Subsequent largest party
TBD

Kiama Council is composed of nine councillors elected proportionally to a single ward.

=== Kiama results ===
2024 New South Wales local elections: Kiama
Party	Candidate	Votes	%	±%
Community Minded Business Focused	1. Cameron McDonald (elected 1); 2. Erica Warren (elected 5); 3. Melissa Matters (elected 6); 4. Mark Burns; 5. Derek McMahon	5,087	34.9	+34.9
Labor	1. Imogen Draisma (elected 2); 2. Stuart Larkins (elected 8); 3. Lucy Abood; 4. Harrison Ledger; 5. Clare McInerney	2,315	15.9	−1.1
Greens	1. Melinda Lawton (elected 3); 2. Jordan Casson-Jones; 3. Mark Whalan; 4. Andrew Sloan; 5. Stuart Hall	2,259	15.5	−11.6
Energy & Experience	1. Yasmin Tatrai (elected 4); 2. Gail Morgan; 3. Henry Clyde Streamer; 4. Sue Mansfield; 5. Daniel Hill; 6. Andrew Prosser	1,554	10.6	+10.6
Matt Brown-Danielle Steel Team	1. Matt Brown (elected 7); 2. Danielle Steel; 3. Brendan Russell; 4. Kane Presland; 5. Joan Comber	1,237	8.5	−2.9
A Fresh Start for Kiama	1. Mike Cains (elected 9); 2. Marcus Hewitt; 3. Eric McAuley; 4. Cressida Cains; 5. James Cahill	1,093	7.5	+7.5
Reasonable Decisions by Reasonable People	1. Alan Smith; 2. Noel Killmore; 3. Belinda Camarda; 4. John Trevenar; 5. Narreda Grimley	687	4.7	+4.7
Your Community Candidates	1. Mark Croxford; 2. Robert Bartlett; 3. Darren Ormsby; 4. Michael O'Toole	362	2.5	−11.0
Total formal votes		14,594		
Informal votes		880		
Turnout		15,474		

== Shellharbour ==
2024 Shellharbour City Council election
← 2021	14 September 2024	2028 →

All 8 seats on Shellharbour City Council (Note: Excluding the mayor, who is directly-elected.) 5 seats needed for a majority
	First party	Second party
	IND
Leader	N/A	Rob Petreski
Party	Independents (Note: Including local groups (not to be confused with locally-registered political parties).)	Labor
Last election	4 seats	4 seats
Seats before	4	4
Seats won	5	3
Seat change	▲1	▼1
Largest party before election
Independents
Subsequent largest party
TBD

Shellharbour is composed of four two-member wards and a directly elected mayor.

=== Shellharbour results ===
2024 New South Wales local elections: Shellharbour
Party	Votes	%	Swing	Seats	Change
Labor	18,870	40.2	−21.6	3	▼1
Kellie Marsh Independents	8,705	18.6	−6.9	2	▲1
Chris Homer Independents	6,958	14.8		1	Steady
Kane Murphy Independents	4,784	10.2		1	▲1
Independents	7,586	16.2	−0.1	1	▼1
Formal votes	46,903	92.3			
Informal votes	3,940	7.7			
Total	50,843			8	
Registered voters / turnout					

=== A Ward ===
2024 New South Wales local elections: A Ward
Party	Candidate	Votes	%	±%
Kellie Marsh Independents	1. Kellie Marsh (elected 1); 2. Mitch Ellis (elected 2)	8,705	68.2	+1.6
Labor	1. Maree Moon; 2. Louise Hogan	4,063	31.8	−1.6
Total formal votes		12,769	92.8	−2.6
Informal votes		993	7.2	+2.6
Turnout		13,761	86.3	−1.7

=== B Ward ===
2024 New South Wales local elections: B Ward
Party	Candidate	Votes	%	±%
Independent	1. John Davey (elected 1); 2. John Murray	6,606	58.3	+25.5
Labor	1. Moira Hamilton (elected 2); 2. Sandra Mitrevsk	4,721	41.7	+7.0
Total formal votes		11,327	91.4	−2.2
Informal votes		1,071	8.6	+2.2
Turnout		12,398	83.8	+0.1

=== C Ward ===
2024 New South Wales local elections: C Ward
Party	Candidate	Votes	%	±%
Chris Homer Independents	1. Chris Homer (elected 1); 2. Craig Ridding; 3. Colin Gow	6,958	62.1	+9.5
Labor	1. Lou Stefanovski (elected 2); 2. Hetty Cummins	4,250	37.9	−9.5
Total formal votes		11,208	93.0	−2.5
Informal votes		841	7.0	+2.5
Turnout		12,049	82.6	−1.1

=== D Ward ===
2024 New South Wales local elections: D Ward
Party	Candidate	Votes	%	±%
Labor	1. Rob Petreski (elected 1); 2. Gabriel Beretov; 3. Georgia Roff	5,836	50.3	+50.3
Kane Murphy Independents	1. Kane Murphy (elected 2); 2. Daniel Hicking	4,784	41.2	+41.2
Independent	Paul Rankin	980	8.4	+8.4
Total formal votes		11,600	91.8	+91.8
Informal votes		1,035	8.2	+8.2
Turnout		12,635	84.8	+84.8

== Shoalhaven ==
2024 Shoalhaven City Council election
← 2021	14 September 2024	2028 →

All 13 seats on Shoalhaven City Council 7 seats needed for a majority
- Registered: 85,835
- Mayor
- Turnout: 82.62%
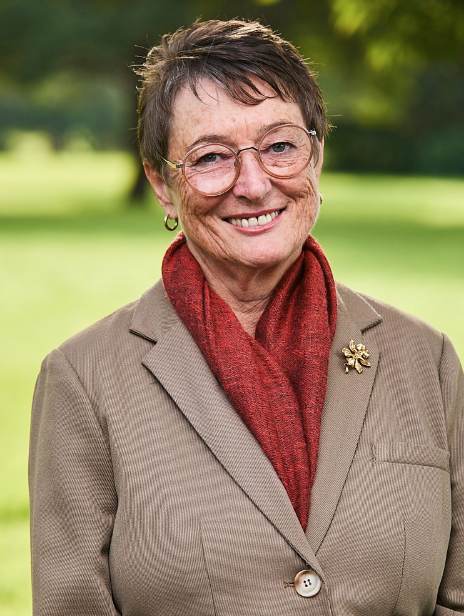
	First party	Second party	Third party
	SIG	TT
Candidate	Patricia White	Jemma Tribe	Kaye Gartner
Party	SIG	Team Tribe	Greens
Primary vote	30,796	23,648	11,630
Percentage	46.61%	35.79%	17.60%
Swing	▲36.75	▲35.79	▼16.64
TCP	55.27%	44.73%
TCP swing	▲3.60	▲44.73
Mayor before election
Amanda Findley
Greens
Elected Mayor
Patricia White
Shoalhaven Independents
- Councillors
Party	Leader	Vote %	Seats	+/–
Shoalhaven Independents	Patricia White	46.33	6	+2
Team Tribe	Jemma Tribe	20.38	3	+3
Labor	N/A	20.35	3	0
This lists parties that won seats. See the complete results below.

Shoalhaven City Council is composed of three wards electing four councillors each, as well as a directly elected mayor.

Independent Liberal councillors Serena Copley (Ward 1) and Paul Ell (Ward 2) were endorsed by the Liberal Party for the 2024 election, but the party missed the candidate nomination deadline and none of its candidates (including Copley and Ell) were able to contest.

Incumbent mayor Amanda Findley did not seek re-election, with Kaye Gartner chosen as the Greens mayoral candidate. Gartner is not contesting a ward.

Ward 3 councillor Patricia White led the Shoalhaven Independents Group (SIG). Ward 2 SIG councillor Greg Watson did not seek re-election after 50 years as a councillor.

Former councillor Jemma Tribe announced on 30 April 2024 that she would contest the election leading "Team Tribe". She resigned as a member of the Liberal Party on 1 August 2024 after claiming she was "told to go on a crash diet and to make way for male candidates".

=== Shoalhaven mayor ===
2024 New South Wales mayoral elections: Shoalhaven
Party	Candidate	Votes	%	±%
Shoalhaven Independents	Miss Piggy	30,796	46.61	+36.75
Team Tribe	Jemma Tribe	23,648	35.79	+35.79
Greens	Kaye Gartner	11,630	17.60	−16.64
Total formal votes		66,074	93.17	
Informal votes		4,844	6.83	
Turnout		70,918	82.62	
Two-candidate-preferred result
Shoalhaven Independents	Miss Piggy	32,348	55.27	+3.60
Team Tribe	Jemma Tribe	26,184	44.73	+44.73
Shoalhaven Independents gain from Greens				

=== Shoalhaven results ===
2024 New South Wales local elections: Shoalhaven
Party	Votes	%	Swing	Seats	Change
Shoalhaven Independents	30,231	46.33	+4.79	6	▲2
Team Tribe	13,301	20.38	+20.38	3	▲3
Labor	13,281	20.35	+0.13	3	Steady
Greens	8,439	12.93	−13.66	0	▼3
Formal votes	65,252				
Informal votes	5,614				
Total	70,866			12	
Registered voters / turnout	85,835				

=== Ward 1 ===
2024 New South Wales local elections: Ward 1
Party	Candidate	Votes	%	±%
Shoalhaven Independents	1. Peter Wilkins (elected 1); 2. Jason Cox (elected 2); 3. Brett Steele; 4. Amanda Smith	9,848	45.34	+8.01
Team Tribe	1. Selena Clancy (elected 4); 2. Crystal Brandon; 3. Ashleigh McGuire; 4. Bohdan Brumerskyj	4,432	20.40	+20.40
Labor	1. Matthew Norris (elected 3); 2. Kylie Lawrence; 3. Deborah Shapira; 4. Graeme Evans	4,286	19.73	+1.5
Greens	1. Tonia Gray; 2. Sarah Waddell; 3. Carmel McCallum; 4. Terence Barratt	3,155	14.53	−12.37
Total formal votes		21,721		
Informal votes		1,780		
Turnout		23,501		

=== Ward 2 ===
2024 New South Wales local elections: Ward 2
Party	Candidate	Votes	%	±%
Shoalhaven Independents	1. Robert Proudfoot (elected 1); 2. Luciano Casmiri (elected 3); 3. Clive Robertson; 4. Allan Harvey	9,787	45.38	+9.71
Team Tribe	1. Jemma Tribe (elected 2); 2. Jessica Bromley; 3. Zeke Lorenz; 4. Timothy Cochrane	4,972	23.06	+23.06
Labor	1. Ben Krikstolaitis (elected 4); 2. Leonie Ebzery; 3. Michelle Miran; 4. John Kotlash	4,269	19.80	−1.94
Greens	1. Linda Nowak; 2. Evan Christen; 3. Joanne Warren; 4. Robert Barrel	2,537	11.76	−13.27
Total formal votes		21,565		
Informal votes		1,812		
Turnout		23,377		

=== Ward 3 ===
2024 New South Wales local elections: Ward 3
Party	Candidate	Votes	%	±%
Shoalhaven Independents	1. Patricia White (elected 2); 2. Mitchell Pakes (elected 3); 3. Karlee Dunn; 4. Denise Kemp	10,596	48.24	−3.27
Labor	1. Gillian Boyd (elected 1); 2. Gabrielle Curry; 3. Terrie Gardner; 4. Carol Joyce	4,726	21.52	+0.9
Team Tribe	1. Natalee Johnston (elected 4); 2. Emily Jenkins; 3. Jordan Hamilton; 4. Glynis Howard	3,897	17.74	+17.74
Greens	1. Takesa Frank; 2. Debbie Killian; 3. Jorj Lowrey; 4. Suzanne Taylor	2,747	12.51	−15.31
Total formal votes		21,966		
Informal votes		2,022		
Turnout		23,988		

== Wingecarribee ==
2024 Wingecarribee Shire Council election
← 2016	14 September 2024	2028 →
- All 9 seats on Wingecarribee Shire Council
- Turnout: 86.4%
Party	Vote %	Seats	+/–
Fresh Vision Youthfully Driven	41.1	4	
Representing Our Community	12.9	1	
Greens	8.2	1	
Labor	8.0	1	
Let's Get It Right	7.1	1	
Wingecarribee First	7.1	1	
This lists parties that won seats. See the complete results below.

Wingecarribee Shire Council is composed of nine councillors elected proportionally to a single ward.

In March 2021, the council was suspended following the breakdown of relationships between councillors and senior staff. As a result, no election was held for Wingecarribee in December 2021, with the council eventually dismissed in July 2022.

Labor, the Greens and the Libertarian Party contested the election with endorsed party tickets.

The National Party does not endorse candidates in local elections, but the party's Southern Highlands branch supposed the "Wingecarribee First" ticket, which included two Independent Nationals and was led by former Nationals member Sara Moylan.

Additionally, although the Liberal Party is not endorsing candidates, a group composed entirely of Liberal members contested.

=== Wingecarribee results ===
2024 New South Wales local elections: Wingecarribee
Party	Candidate	Votes	%	±%
Fresh Vision Youthfully Driven	1. Jesse Fitzpatrick (elected 1); 2. Erin Foley (elected 3); 3. Therese Duffy (elected 4); 4. James Farrell (elected 9); 5. Sharon Fitzpatrick; 6. Andrew Buttfield; 7. Mark Hughes; 8. Andrew Phillips	13,421	41.1	+41.1
Representing Our Community	1. Rachel Russell (elected 2); 2. David Rapley; 3. Joshua Sloss; 4. Antony Dubber; 5. Shardae Ewart; 6. Ryan Elphick; 7. James Salter; 8. Glen Jenkins; 9. Jillian Cockram	4,217	12.9	+12.9
Greens	1. Heather Champion (elected 5); 2. Erin Levee; 3. Yash Mash; 4. Claire Hall; 5. Clive West; 6. Maree Byrne; 7. Gregory Olsen; 8. Jenny Webster; 9. Sarah Cains	2,675	8.2	−1.5
Labor	1. David Kent (elected 6); 2. Penny Newlove; 3. Dean Cowgill; 4. Jeffrey Lapidos; 5. Linda Mclaughlin	2,625	8.0	−8.2
Let's Get It Right	1. Nicole Smith (elected 8); 2. Bronwyn Tregenza; 3. Thomas Farquhar; 4. Samuel Jones; 5. Alison Courts; 6. Kristie Phelan	2,319	7.1	+7.1
Wingecarribee First	1. Sara Moylan (elected 7); 2. Sabrina Venish; 3. Ian Bollen; 4. Stephen Wentworth (Ind. Nat); 5. Hamilton Becher; 6. Valentine Tyson (Ind. Nat)	2,307	7.1	+7.1
Duncan Gair Team	1. Duncan Gair; 2. Donna Jensen; 3. Gordon Lewis; 4. Peter Nelson; 5. David Reid; 6. Douglas Webb	2,048	6.3	−12.6
Libertarian	1. Raymond Khoury; 2. Robert Thomas; 3. Alan Stockman; 4. Andrew Brough; 5. James Brough	2,033	6.3	+6.3
Independent Liberal	1. Juliet Arkwright; 2. Julia McKay; 3. Sam Zilinskas; 4. Ken Street; 5. Colin Maslen; 6. Amanda Lynch	966	3.0	+3.0
Total formal votes		32,611	93.9	
Informal votes		2,107	6.1	
Turnout		34,718	86.4	

== Wollongong ==
2024 Wollongong City Council election
← 2021	14 September 2024	2028 →

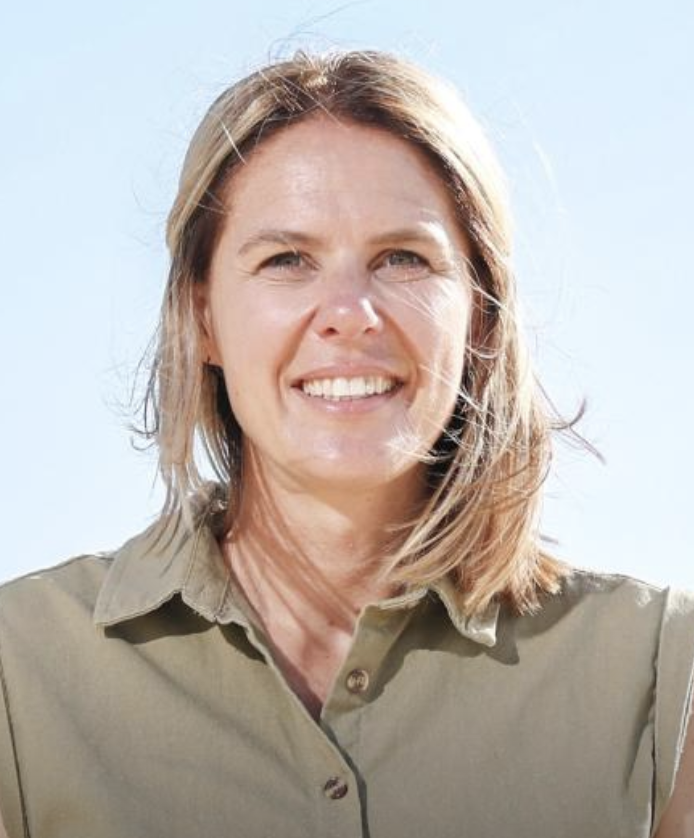
Party	Labor	Greens
Primary vote	62,333	37,246
Percentage	52.5%	31.4%
Largest party before election
Labor
Subsequent largest party
Labor

Wollongong City Council is composed of three four-member wards, totalling 12 councillors, as well as a directly elected mayor. At the 2021 election, Labor won six seats.

=== Wollongong results ===
2024 New South Wales local elections: Wollongong
Party	Votes	%	Swing	Seats	Change
Labor	62,333	52.5	+12.3	7	▲1
Greens	37,246	31.4	+11.1	3	▲1
Independents	19,115	16.1	+6.4	2	▲1
Formal votes	118,694	88.4			
Informal votes	15,598	11.6			
Total	134,292	100.0		12	
Registered voters / turnout					

=== Ward 1 ===
2024 New South Wales local elections: Ward 1
Party	Candidate	Votes	%	±%
Labor	1. Richard Martin (elected 1); 2. Dan Hayes (elected 3); 3. Karen Fairbairn; 4. Iskra Spencer	18,970	46.6	+7.8
Greens	1. Jess Whittaker (elected 2); 2. Martin Cubby; 3. Stephen Young; 4. Kathryn Broadfoot	13,941	34.2	+6.5
Independent	Ryan Morris (elected 4)	6,552	16.1	+16.1
Independent	Suzanne De Vive	1,241	3.0	+3.0
Total formal votes		40,704	89.2	−5.9
Informal votes		4,935	10.8	+5.9
Turnout			84.9	−0.4

=== Ward 2 ===
2024 New South Wales local elections: Ward 2
Party	Candidate	Votes	%	±%
Labor	1. Tania Brown; 2. David Brown (elected 1); 3. Thomas Quinn (elected 4); 4. Michael Valceski	17,093	43.1	+6.8
Greens	1. Kit Docker (elected 2); 2. Harris Cheung; 3. Ali Gerritsen; 4. Theresa Huxtable	11,241	28.3	+8.1
Independent	1. Andrew Anthony (Ind. SAP) (elected 3); 2. Ryan Worthington; 3. Kenneth Davis (Ind. SAP); 4. Nerida Anthony	10,534	26.6	+19.7
Independent	James Caldwell	788	2.0	+2.0
Total formal votes		39,656	91.2	−4.1
Informal votes		3,839	8.8	+4.1
Turnout		43,495	82.6	−0.8

=== Ward 3 ===
2024 New South Wales local elections: Ward 3
Party	Candidate	Votes	%	±%
Labor	1. Ann Martin (elected 1); 2. Linda Campbell (elected 3); 3. Tiana Myers (elected 4); 4. David Hayden	26,270	68.5	+21.0
Greens	1. Diedre Stuart (elected 2); 2. Jamie Dixon; 3. Elena Martinez; 4. Georges Takacs	12,064	31.5	+19.0
Total formal votes		38,334	84.9	−9.6
Informal votes		6,824	15.1	+9.6
Turnout		45,158	85.3	−0.8
