= Double-track railway =

Railway route with two lines

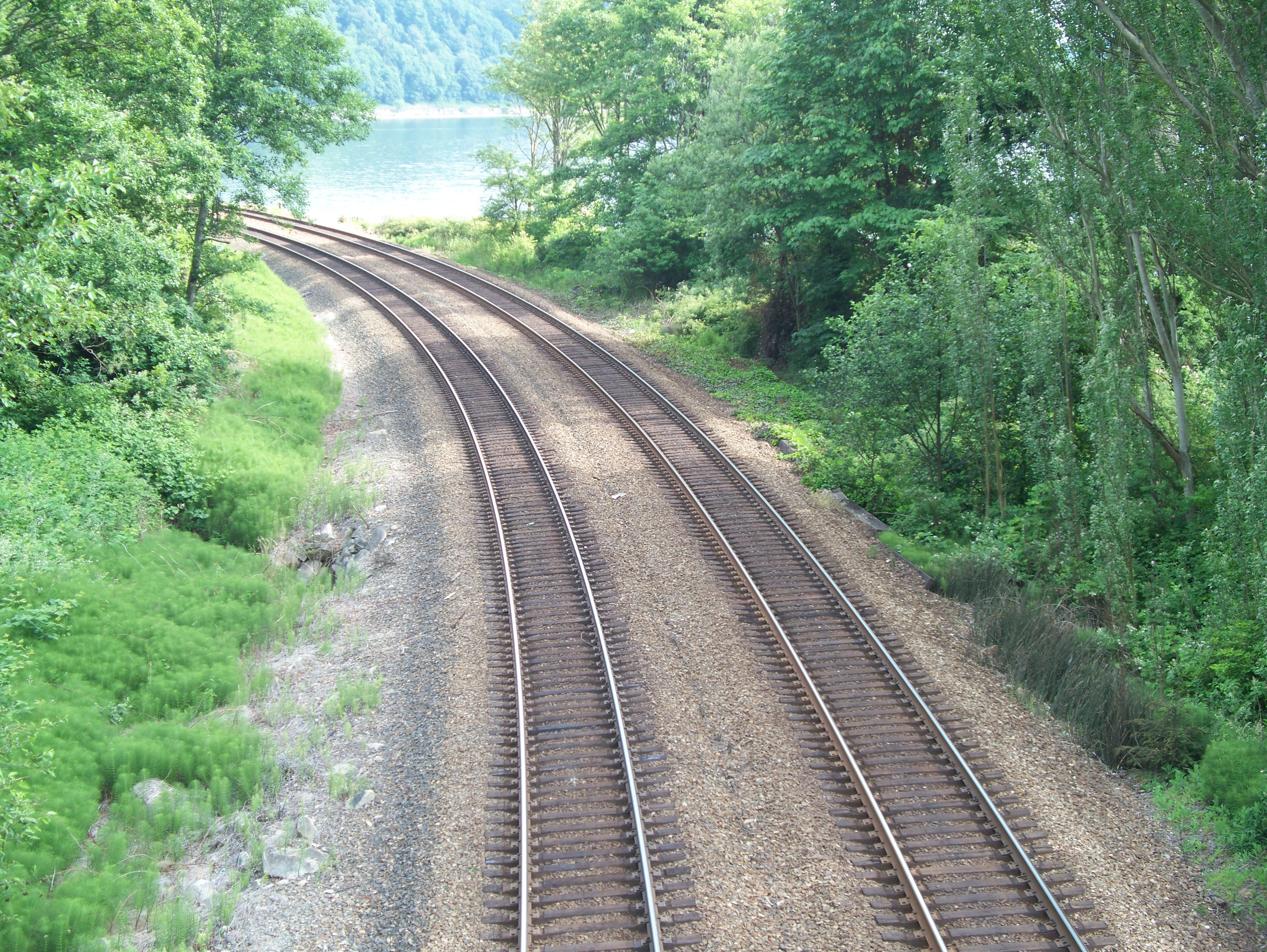
A double-track railway line running through a wooded area

A double-track railway usually involves running one track in each direction, compared to a single-track railway, where trains in both directions share the same track.

== Overview ==
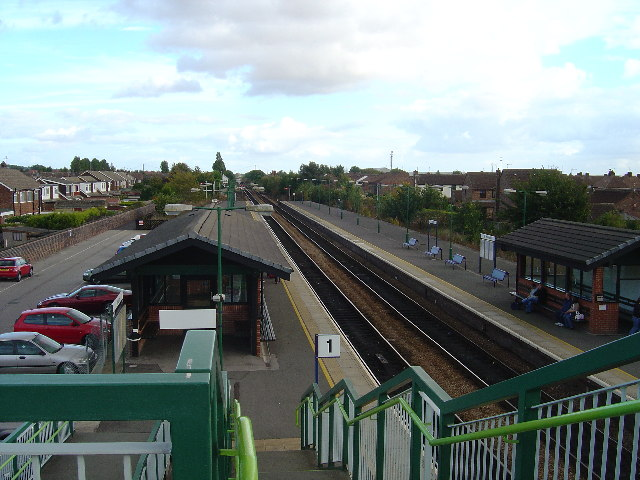
Brough station, East Riding of Yorkshire, England. Platform 1 is for trains north and eastbound (down), platform 2 is for trains south and westbound (up)

In the earliest days of railways in the United Kingdom, most lines were built as double-track because of the difficulty of co-ordinating operations before the invention of the telegraph. The lines also tended to be busy enough to be beyond the capacity of a single track. In the early days, the Board of Trade did not consider any single-track railway line to be complete.

In the United States, most lines were built as single-track for reasons of cost; very inefficient timetable working systems were used to prevent head-on collisions on single lines. This improved with the development of the telegraph and the train order system.

== Operation ==
=== Handedness ===
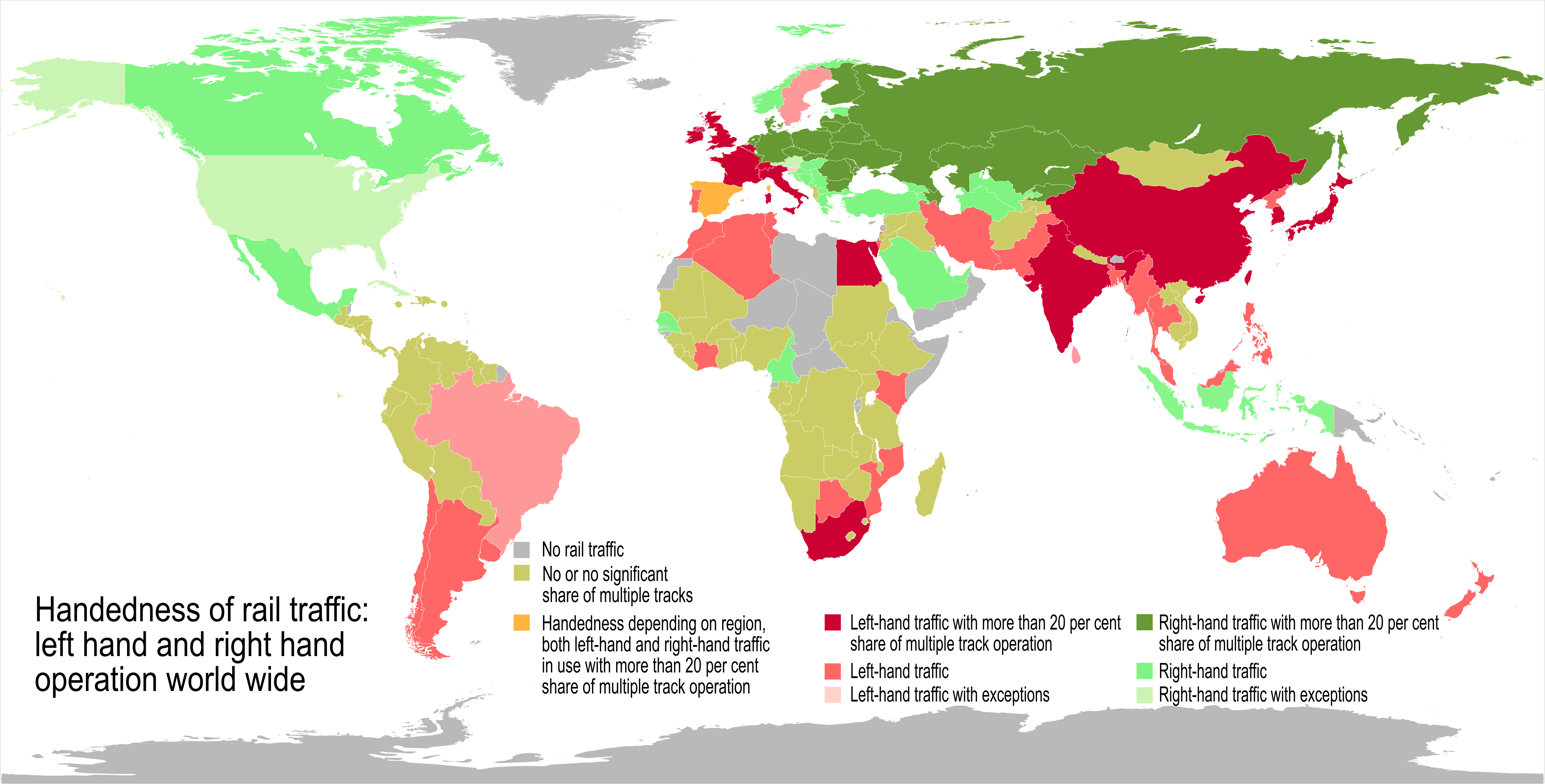
Handedness of rail traffic worldwide

Handedness of rail traffic in Europe: Right-hand traffic Left-hand traffic Only single-track No railway

In any given country, railway traffic generally runs to one side of a double-track line, not always the same side as road traffic. Thus in Belgium, China, France, (Note: Apart from the classic lines of the former German Alsace and Lorraine.) Sweden, (Note: Apart from Malmö and further south.) Switzerland, Italy and Portugal for example, the railways use left-hand running, while the roads use right-hand running.

However, there are many exceptions:

- Metro systems often are RHT, even when the heavy rail network runs on the left.
- In Finland, railway traffic uses mainly right, with the exception of the Ring Rail Line and the separate commuter rail tracks to Kerava and Leppävaara in Helsinki area which use the left.
- In Switzerland, the Lausanne Metro and railways in the Germany border area, as well as all tram systems, use RHT.
- In Indonesia, right-hand running for railways (including LRT and MRT systems) and left-hand running for roads.
- In Spain, where rails are RHT, metro systems in Madrid and Bilbao use LHT.
- In Portugal, all heavy rail systems, including the national railway network, high speed lines and the Lisbon Metro use LHT; while all light rail systems use RHT because the majority of them share their tracks with the road.
- In Sweden, the tram systems in Gothenburg (except for Angered station and stations with island platforms), Lund, Norrköping and Stockholm (except the Alvik – Alleparken section) use the right. The railways and the metro use the left in general, but in Malmö they use the right due to the connection to Denmark.
- Ukraine's Kriviy Rih metrotram and Russia's Volgograd metrotram use the left due to tramcars having doors only on right side, which makes it impossible to use the right at stations with island platforms. The СТ2 route in Volgograd, however, on section between Pionerskaya and Elshanka stations do not change it's traffic side due to having tramcars with doors on both sides.
- On the pre-1918 French-German border, for example, flyovers were provided so that trains moving on the left in France end up on the right in Germany and vice versa.
- In the United States, three Metra commuter railroad lines formerly owned by the CNW near Chicago operate with left-hand running, a historical oddity caused by the original placement of station buildings and the directionality of travel demand.

==== Locomotive design ====
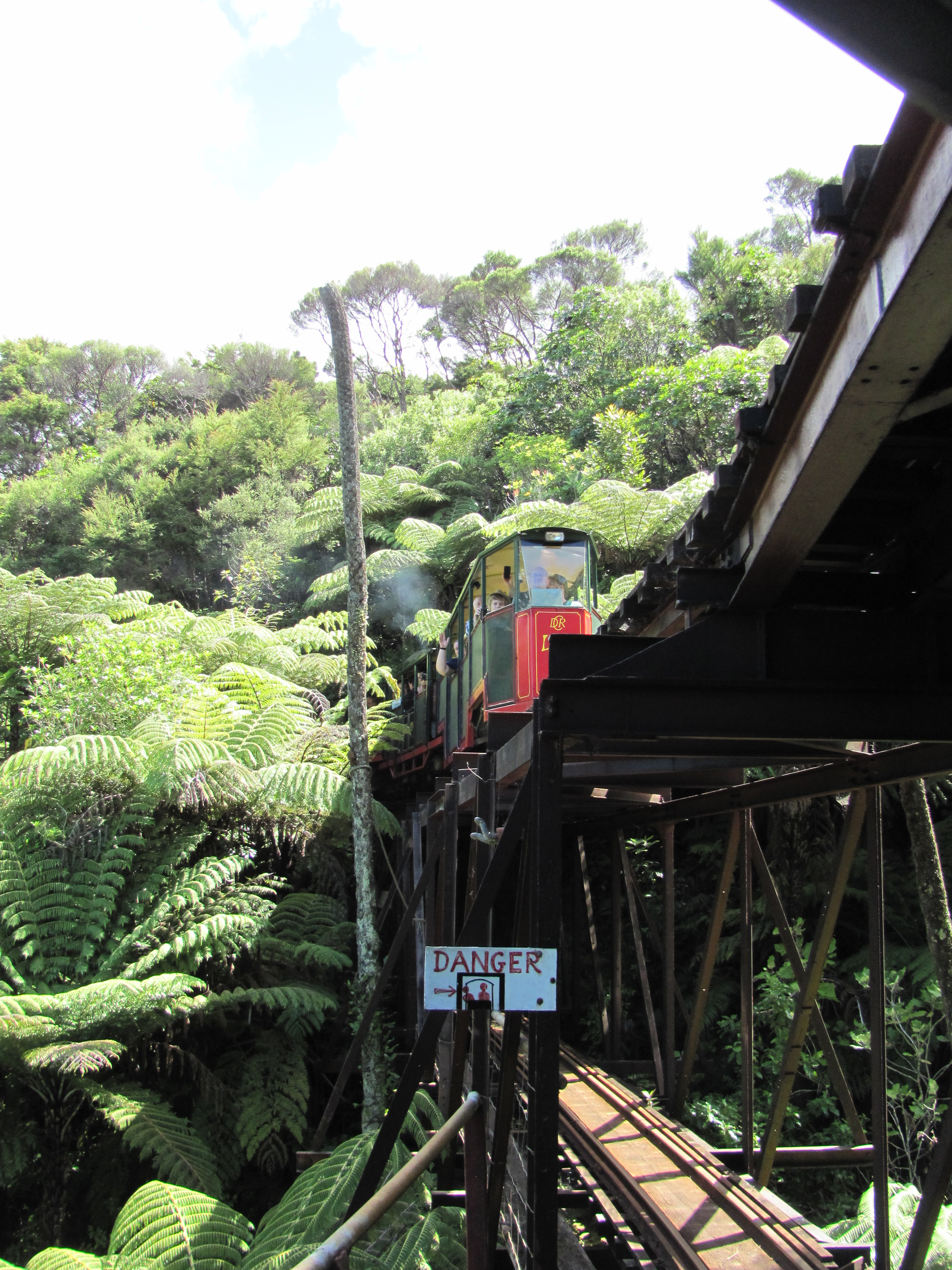
Driving Creek Railway, New Zealand

Handedness of traffic can affect locomotive design. For the driver, visibility is usually good from both sides of the driving cab, so the choice of which side the driver should sit is less important. For example, the French SNCF Class BB 7200 is designed to use the left-hand track and therefore uses LHD. When the design was modified for use in the Netherlands as NS Class 1600, the driving cab was not completely redesigned, keeping the driver on the left even though trains use the right-hand track in the Netherlands. Generally, the left/right principle in a country is followed mostly on double track.

Steam locomotives could be driven from either side, railway companies generally made a decision about which side of the cab the driver would operate the controls from. The UK's Great Western Railway used the left-hand track but their drivers were positioned on the right-hand side of the locomotives, in contrast the UK's Lancashire and Yorkshire Railway, also used the left-hand track but positioned their drivers on the left.

On single track, when trains meet, the train that does not stop often uses the straight path in the turnout, which can be left or right.

=== Bi-directional running ===
Double-track railways, especially older ones, may use each track exclusively in one direction. This arrangement simplifies the signalling systems, especially where the signalling is mechanical (e.g. semaphore signals).

Where the signals and points (UK term) or rail switches (US) are power-operated, it can be worthwhile to provide signals for each line which cater for movement in either direction, so that the double line becomes a pair of single lines. This allows trains to use one track where the other track is out of service due to track maintenance work, or a train failure, or for a fast train to overtake a slow train.

=== Crossing loops ===
Most crossing loops are not regarded as double-track even though they consist of multiple tracks. If the crossing loop is long enough to hold several trains, and to allow opposing trains to cross without slowing down or stopping, then that may be regarded as double-track. A more modern British term for such a layout is an extended loop.

=== Track centres ===
The distance between the tracks' centres makes a difference in cost and performance of a double-track line. The track centres can be as closely spaced and as cheap as possible, but maintenance must be done on the side. Signals for bi-directional working cannot be mounted between the tracks, so they must be mounted on the 'wrong' side of the line or on expensive signal bridges. For standard gauge tracks, the distance may be 4 metres (13 ft) or less. Track centres are usually further apart on high speed lines, as pressure waves knock each other as high-speed trains pass. Track centres are also usually further apart on sharp curves, and the length and width of trains is contingent on the minimum railway curve radius of the railway.

Increasing the width of track centres of 6 metres (20 ft) or more makes it much easier to mount signals and overhead wiring structures. Very widely spaced centres at major bridges can have military value. It also makes it harder for rogue ships and barges to knock out both bridges in the same accident.

Railway lines in desert areas affected by sand dunes are sometimes built with the two tracks separated, so that if one is covered by sand, the other(s) are still serviceable.

If the standard track centre is changed, it can take a very long time for most or all tracks to be brought into line.

=== Accidents ===
On British lines, the space between the two running rails of a single railway track is called the "four foot" (owing to it being 'four foot something' in width), while the space between the different tracks is called the "six foot". It is not safe to stand in the gap between the tracks when trains pass by on both lines, as happened in the Bere Ferrers accident of 1917.

- Narrow track centres on the Liverpool and Manchester Railway contributed to a fatal accident on opening day.
- A US naval scientist and submarine pioneer, Captain Jacques, was killed getting out of the wrong side of a train at Hadley Wood in 1916.
- Narrow track centres contribute to "Second Train Coming" accidents at level crossings since it is harder to see the second train – for example, the accident at Elsenham level crossing in 2005.

=== Temporary single track ===
When one track of a double-track railway is out of service for maintenance or a train breaks down, all trains may be concentrated on the one usable track. There may be bi-directional signalling and suitable crossovers to enable trains to move onto the other track expeditiously (such as in the Channel Tunnel), or there may be some kind of manual safeworking to control trains on what is now a section of single track.

Accidents can occur if the temporary safeworking system is not implemented properly, as in:

- Brühl train disaster, Germany – 2000
- Zoufftgen rail crash, France and Luxembourg – 2006.

== Out-of-gauge trains ==
From time to time, railways are asked to transport exceptional loads such as massive electrical transformers that are too tall, too wide or too heavy to operate normally. Special measures must be carefully taken to plan successful and safe operation of out-of-gauge trains. For example, adjacent tracks of a double line might have to be shut down to avoid collisions with trains on those adjacent tracks.

== Passing lanes ==
These are a form of crossing loop, but are long enough to allow trains approaching each other from opposite directions on single-track lines to cross (or pass) each other without reducing speed. In order for passing lanes to operate safely and effectively, trains must be timetabled so that they arrive at and enter the loop with close time tolerances, otherwise they will need to slow or even be brought to a complete stop to allow the oncoming train to pass. They are suited to lines with light to moderate traffic.

An example of where passing lanes have been installed in order to improve travel times and increase line capacity is the 160-kilometre (100-mile) section of the Main Southern railway line in Australia between Junee and Albury. This was built as a single track line in stages between 1878 and 1881, and was partially duplicated between 2005 and 2010 by the construction of four passing lanes each 6 km (4 mi) long. In this instance, this was accomplished by extending pre-existing crossing loops of either 900 metres (3,000 ft) or 1,500 metres (4,900 ft) in length.

== Construction ==
=== Duplication ===
The process of expanding a single track to double track is called duplication or doubling, unless the expansion is to restore what was previously double track, in which case it is called redoubling.

The strongest evidence that a line was built as single-track and duplicated at a later date consists of major structures such as bridges and tunnels that are twinned. One example is the twin Slade tunnels on the Ilfracombe Branch Line in the UK. Twinned structures may be identical in appearance, or like some tunnels between Adelaide and Belair in South Australia, substantially different in appearance, being built to different structure gauges.

==== Tunnel duplication ====
Tunnels are confined spaces and are difficult to duplicate while trains keep on running. Generally they are duplicated by building a second tunnel. An exception is the Hoosac Tunnel, which was duplicated by enlarging the bore.

==== Carried-out provision for duplication ====
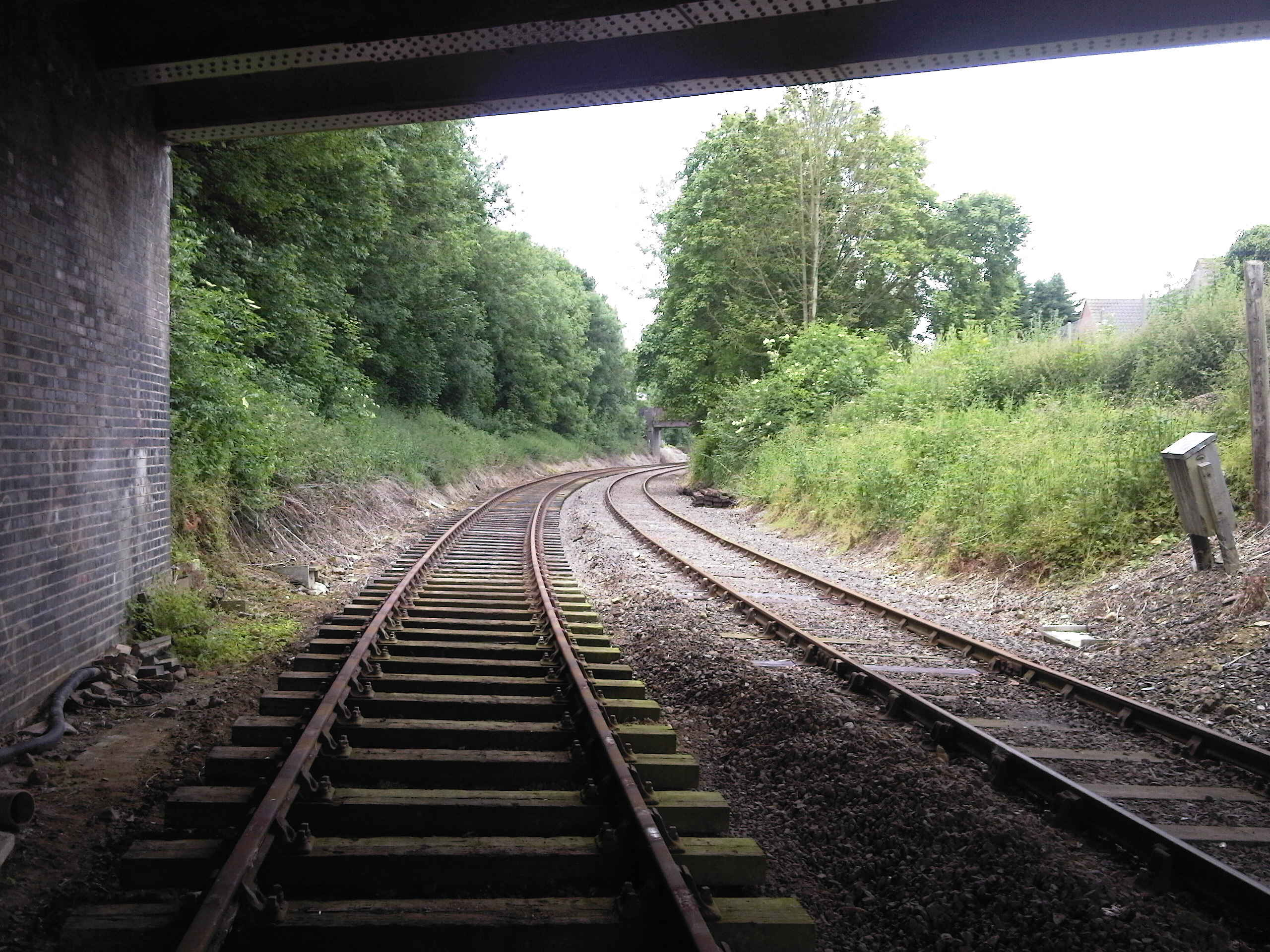
A partially restored double-track section south of Wymondham Abbey, England, on the Mid-Norfolk Railway

To reduce initial costs of a line that is certain to see heavy traffic in the future, a line may be built as single-track but with earthworks and structures designed for ready duplication. An example is the Strathfield to Hamilton line in New South Wales, which was constructed as mainly single-track in the 1880s, with full duplication completed around 1910. All bridges, tunnels, stations, and earthworks were built for double track. Stations with platforms with 11-foot (3.4 m) centres had to be widened later to 12-foot (3.7 m) centres, except for Gosford.

The former Baltimore and Ohio Railroad (B&O) line between Baltimore and Jersey City, now owned by CSX and Conrail Shared Assets Operations, is an example of a duplication line that was reduced to single-track in most locations, but has since undergone re-duplication in many places between Baltimore and Philadelphia when CSX increased freight schedules in the late 1990s.

Also:

- Smardale Gill viaduct.
- Westerham line.
- The Menangle Bridge was single track (1863) but built for double track (1890s). A second track was laid temporarily to allow testing both tracks at once.
- The Long Island Rail Road's Ronkonkoma Branch was originally single track for most of its length, but land for a double track was purchased as part of a project to electrify part of the line in the 1980s. A double track was laid along the rest of the segment in 2018.

==== Never-used provision for duplication ====
Some lines are built as single-track with provision for duplication, but the duplication is never carried out. Examples are:

- Swanage Railway
- Bluebell Railway: Horsted Keynes to Culver Junction (Lewes).
- Keighley and Worth Valley Railway – including bridge and tunnels and a deviation.
- Westerham in Kent.
- Mid-Wales Railway (parts).
- Neath and Brecon Railway
- Monkerei Tunnel in New South Wales – double track size at summit reduces fume problem in tunnel.
- Golgotha Tunnel near Eythorne on the East Kent Light Railway was only partly excavated for the second track.
- Skitube – A provision for a second 300-metre-long passing loop has been made inside the tunnel.
- New Jezreel Valley railway – Planned as a double-tracked line, but only a single track has been constructed due to budgetary issues.
- Linha do Leste and Linha do Alentejo in Portugal. The embankments in all bridges were built to double track but the second one was never installed.
- West Coast Line (Sweden). The line through Varberg is single track but prepared for double track with long enough bridges over the track. The national traffic administration (and predecessor) has since 1980 planned to build the double track, but couldn't for reason of noise rules applying to reconstructions. A new tunnel with a station was considered too expensive but is in the time plan now.

=== Singling ===
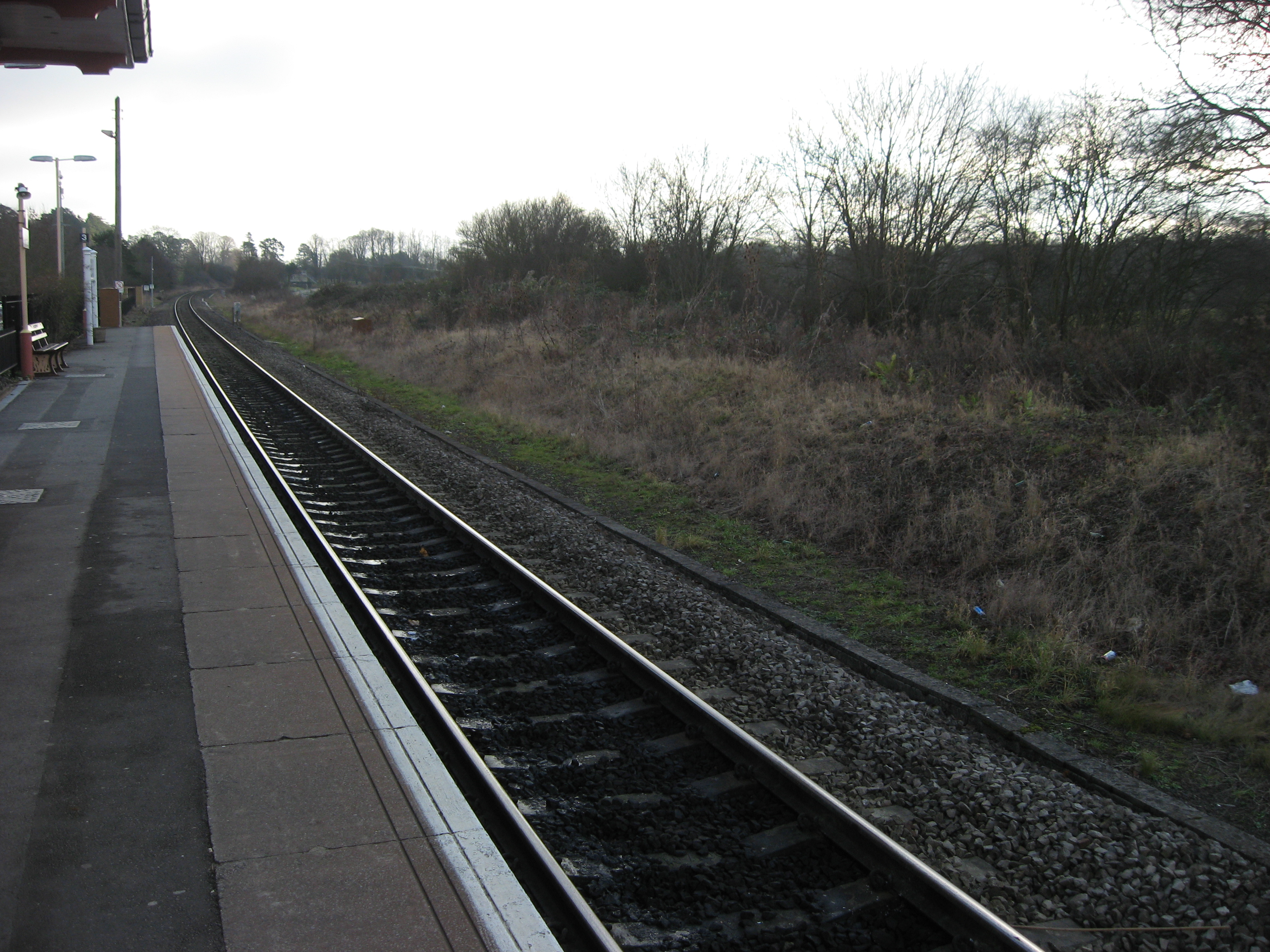
Rail track after singling, seen at Charlbury, in Oxfordshire, England (Note: This was before the line there was redoubled in 2011.)

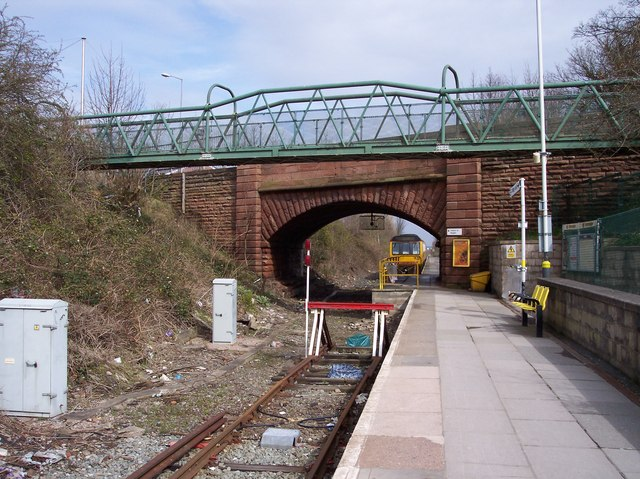
A single-track railway at Kirkby, England, which was formerly doubled

When the capacity of a double-track railway is in excess of requirements, the two tracks may be reduced to one, in order to reduce maintenance costs and property taxes. In some countries this is called singling. Notable examples of this in England occurred on the Oxford–Worcester–Hereford, Princes Risborough–Banbury and Salisbury–Exeter main lines during the 1970s and 1980s. In all of these cases, increases in traffic from the late 1990s have led to the partial reinstatement of double track.

In New Zealand, the Melling Line was singled to the Western Hutt Railway Station in Lower Hutt in 1958 after it became a branch line rather than part of the main Hutt Valley Line. The lines at Kirkby (until 1977) and Ormskirk (until 1970) were double-tracked, when they were converted into single-track railway with cross-platform interchange.

In New South Wales, Australia, the Main Western Railway between Wallerawang and Tarana, and between Gresham and Newbridge were singled in the 1990s. A new passing loop was opened on part of the closed track at Rydal in the Wallerawang–Tarana section during 2019.

=== Tunnel singling ===
A double-track tunnel with restricted clearances is sometimes singled to form a single track tunnel with more generous clearances, such as the Connaught Tunnel in Canada or the Tickhole Tunnel in New South Wales, Australia. In the case of the Tickhole Tunnel a new single-track tunnel was built and the two tracks in the original tunnel were replaced by one track in the centreline of the tunnel. Another case where this was necessary was the Hastings Line in the United Kingdom, where the tunnels were eventually singled to permit the passage of standard British-gauge rolling stock. Before the singling, narrow-bodied stock, specially constructed for the line, had to be used.

As part of the Regional Fast Rail project in Victoria, the rail line between Kyneton and Bendigo was converted from double- to single-track to provide additional clearance through tunnels and under bridges for trains travelling at up to 160 km/h (99 mph).

A similar process can be followed on narrow bridges, such as the Boyne Viaduct, a bridge just north of Drogheda in Ireland.

The bridge over the Murray River between Albury and Wodonga is double-track, but because of insufficient strength in the bridge only one train is allowed on it at a time. The bridge has since been singled as part of the North East Line Standardisation with the old broad gauge track now disconnected but remains in place on the bridge.

==== Other tunnel singling ====
- Hoosac Tunnel, Pan Am Railways, Massachusetts, US.
- Old Main Line Subdivision, B&O, Maryland, US. Entire 58 miles (93 km) subdivision was single-tracked to utilize higher clearances of the 9 tunnels on the line.
- Whitehall Tunnel, B&O, Pennsylvania, US.

=== Wartime doubling ===
Railways that become especially busy in wartime and are duplicated, especially in World War I, may revert to single track when peace returns and the extra capacity is no longer required. The Flanders campaign saw duplication of the Hazebrouck–Ypres line, amongst other works.

== Triple track ==
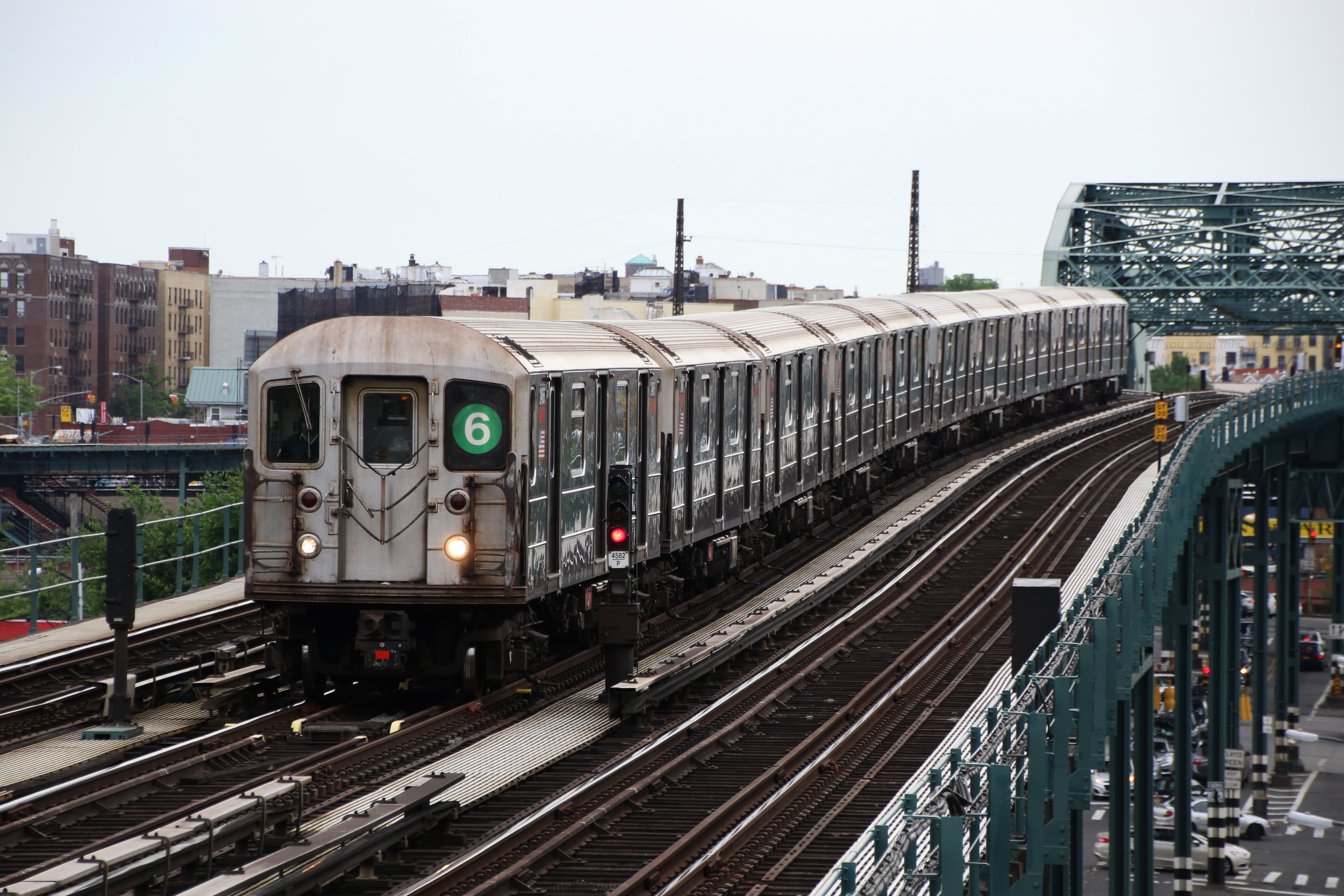
An express 6 train on the IRT Pelham Line, a three-tracked New York City Subway line

Severe gradients can make the headway in the uphill direction much worse than the headway in the downhill direction. Between Whittingham and Maitland, New South Wales, a third track was opened between Whittingham and Branxton in 2011 and Branxton to Maitland in 2012 to equalize the headway in both directions for heavy coal traffic. Triple track could be a compromise between double-track and quad-track; such a system was proposed south of Stockholm Central Station, but was cancelled in favor of Citybanan.

In Melbourne and Brisbane, several double track lines have a third track signalled in both directions, so that two tracks are available in the peak direction during rush hours.

Triple track is used in some parts of the New York City Subway and on the Norristown High-Speed Line to add supplemental rush-hour services. The center track, which serves express trains, is signalled in both directions to allow two tracks to be used in the peak direction during rush hours; the outer tracks use bi-directional running and serve local trains exclusively in one direction. During service disruptions on one of the two outer tracks, trains could also bypass the affected sections on the center track.

The Union Pacific Railroad mainline through Nebraska has a 108-mile (174 km) stretch of triple track between North Platte and Gibbon Junction, due to a high traffic density of 150 trains per day.

Portions of the Canadian National main line in the Greater Toronto Area and Southern Ontario are triple track to facilitate high traffic density of freight services, intercity, and suburban passenger trains sharing the same lines.

India, through its state-owned Indian Railways, has initiated the construction of a third track between Jhansi and Nagpur via Bhopal (approximately 590 kilometres (370 miles)) for reducing the traffic load and delays in passenger train arrivals. The construction between Bina and Bhopal and between Itarsi and Budhni had been completed by April 2020.

== Dual gauge ==
The Melbourne to Albury railway originally consisted of separate 1,600 mm (5 ft 3 in) gauge and 1,435 mm (4 ft 8 1/2 in) gauge single track lines, but when traffic on the broad gauge declined, the lines were converted to bi-directional double track 1,435 mm (4 ft 8 1/2 in) gauge lines.

== Quadruple track ==
Quadruple track consists of four parallel tracks. On a quad-track line, faster trains can overtake slower ones. Quadruple track is mostly used when a line carries both "local" trains that stop often (or slow freight trains) and faster inter-city or high-speed "express" trains. It can also be used in commuter rail or rapid transit. The layout can vary, often with the two outer tracks carrying the local trains that stop at every station so one side of stations can be reached without staircase; this can also be reversed, with express trains on the outside and locals on the inside, for example if staffed ticket booths are wanted, allowing one person for both directions.

At other places, two tracks on one half of the railway carry local trains and the other half faster trains. At the local train stations, the express trains can pass through the station at full speed. For example, on the Nuremberg-Bamberg railway, which is quadruple track for most of its course, the inner two tracks are used by the S-Bahn Nuremberg whereas the outer tracks are used for regional express and Intercity Express trains. The section in northern Fürth where the line is "only" double track creates a major bottleneck. For Berlin Stadtbahn, the two northern tracks are local S-Bahn and the two other for faster trains.

One notable example of quadruple track in the United States was the Pennsylvania Railroad's main corridor through the heart of Pennsylvania around the famous Horseshoe Curve. This line is now owned by Norfolk Southern. Other examples include the Hudson and New Haven Lines, both of which are shared between Metro-North and Amtrak in New York and Connecticut. The New Haven Line is quadruple track along its entire length, while the Hudson Line is only quadruple tracked along the shared portion from Riverdale to Croton–Harmon and along the shared track from Grand Central Terminal to Yankees–East 153rd Street. Amtrak's Northeast Corridor is quadruple tracked in most portions south of New Haven, but also has a few triple-track segments. The Metra Electric District and South Shore Line is quadruple-tracked on most of the main line north of Kensington/115th Street station, with local trains running in the center two tracks, and express trains on the outer two tracks. Running parallel are two additional non-electrified tracks that carry freight rail and Amtrak trains, making the entire right of way a total of six tracks.

The Chūō Main Line is an example of a modern, heavily utilised urban quadruple track railway.

Quadruple track is used in rapid transit systems as well, including: throughout the New York City Subway, the Chicago "L"'s North Side Main Line, SEPTA's Broad Street Line in the United States and on the London Underground in England.

== Oddities ==
=== Non-parallel double track ===
The two tracks of a double-track railway do not have to follow the same alignment if the terrain is difficult. At Frampton, New South Wales, Australia, the uphill track follows something of a horseshoe curve at 1 in 75 gradient, while the shorter downhill track follows the original single track at 1 in 40 grades.

A similar arrangement to Frampton could not be adopted between Rydal and Sodwalls on the Main Western railway line because the 1 in 75 uphill track is on the wrong side of the 1 in 40 downhill track, so both tracks follow the 1 in 75 grade. Another example is at Gunning.

Between Junee and Marinna, New South Wales, the two tracks are at different levels, with the original southbound and downhill track following ground level with a steep gradient, while the newer northbound and uphill track has a gentler gradient at the cost of more cut and fill.

At the Bethungra Spiral, the downhill track follows the original short and steep alignment, while the uphill track follows a longer, more easily graded alignment including a spiral.

At Saunderton, in England, what became the London-to-Birmingham main line of the Great Western Railway in 1909 was initially part of a single-track branch line from Maidenhead. Down trains follow the route of the old branch line, while up trains follow a more gently graded new construction through a tunnel. This scheme avoided the cost of a new double-track tunnel.

=== Directional running ===
Directional running is two separate lines operationally combined to act as a double-track line by converting each line to unidirectional traffic. An example is in central Nevada, where the Western Pacific and Southern Pacific Railroads, longtime rivals who each built and operated tracks between northern California and Utah, agreed to share their lines between meeting points near Winnemucca and Wells, a distance of approximately 180 miles (290 km).

Westbound trains from both companies used the Southern Pacific's Overland Route, and eastbound trains used the Western Pacific's Feather River Route (now called the Central Corridor). Crossovers were constructed where the lines ran in close proximity to allow reverse movements. This was necessary as while for most of this run the tracks straddle opposite sides of the Humboldt River, at points the two tracks are several miles apart and some destinations and branch lines can only be accessed from one of the lines. There is a grade separated crossover of the two lines in the shared track area near Palisade, Nevada, which results in trains following right hand traffic in the eastern half of the shared track area, but left hand traffic in the western half. The Union Pacific Railroad has since acquired both of these lines, and continues to operate them as separate lines using directional running. Amtrak also runs the California Zephyr along these routes.

A similar example exists in the Fraser Canyon in British Columbia, where Canadian National and Canadian Pacific Kansas City each own a single-track line – often on either side of the river. The companies have a joint arrangement where they share resources and operate the canyon as a double-track line over a 155-mile distance (249 km) between meeting points near Mission and Ashcroft. The agreement effectively increased capacity through the corridor from 30 trains per day to over 100 trains daily.

On the segment of the Southern Transcon route from Chicago to Southern California, operated by BNSF Railway, in the center of Kansas, for many years the system was managed, under the directional traffic system, so that eastbound trains were rerouted at Mulvane, south of Wichita, to run via the Arkansas City Subdivision to Newton, and then via La Junta Sub to Ellinor where they rejoined the Transcon, while westbound traffic run on the Transcon (Emporia Sub). When BNSF completed the track doubling in the Emporia Sub between Mulvane and Rose Hill in 2024, the Transcon began handling traffic in both directions, eliminating the need for directional running via Wichita.

In other cases, where the shared lines already run in close proximity, the two companies may share facilities. In Conshohocken, Pennsylvania, where the former Reading Railroad and Pennsylvania Railroad shared lines, the lines even shared overhead electrical wire supports, for a 2-mile (3.2 km) stretch on the northern bank of the Schuylkill River. Both lines eventually came under Conrail ownership in 1976, with the former PRR line being abandoned and now used as a hiking and bicycle path.

There are about 7,500 miles (12,100 km) of routes operated directionally in the United States and Canada, with about 2,000 miles (3,200 km) of those miles running in Texas.

An unusual example used to exist on the Isle of Wight, where until 1926 parallel tracks between Smallbrook Junction and St John's Road existed. The Southern Railway installed the actual junction, but it was only used during heavily trafficked summer months. During the winter, the lines reverted to separate single-track routes.

== Mixing double and single track ==
It may be awkward and confusing to mix double and single track too often because double and single track may use different signalling systems. For example, intermediate mechanical signal boxes on a double-track line can be closed during periods of light traffic, but this cannot be done if there is a single-line section in between. This problem is less serious with electrical signalling such as Centralized traffic control.
