= Frampton, New South Wales =

Frampton
- Town
- Coordinates: 34°42′S 147°55′E
- Country: Australia
- State: New South Wales
- LGA: Gundagai Council
- Location: 14 km (8.7 mi) SW of Cootamundra-Gundagai; 8 km (5.0 mi) NE of Bethungra
- Established: 1875

Government
  - State electorate: Cootamundra
  - Federal division: Riverina

Population
  - Total: 311
- County: Harden

Frampton is a village on the Sydney to Melbourne rail line in the north east part of the Riverina about 14 kilometres south west of Cootamundra and eight kilometres north east of Bethungra.

Cungegong Post Office opened on 1 April 1875, was renamed Frampton in June 1889, renamed Moatefield the following month, named Frampton again in 1905 and closed in 1965. A railway station served the locality from 1878 until closure in 1975, and has now been demolished.

| Preceding station | Former services | Following station |
|---|---|---|
| Bethungra towards Albury | Main Southern Line | Cootamundra towards Sydney |
