= Bethungra Spiral =

Railway in Australia

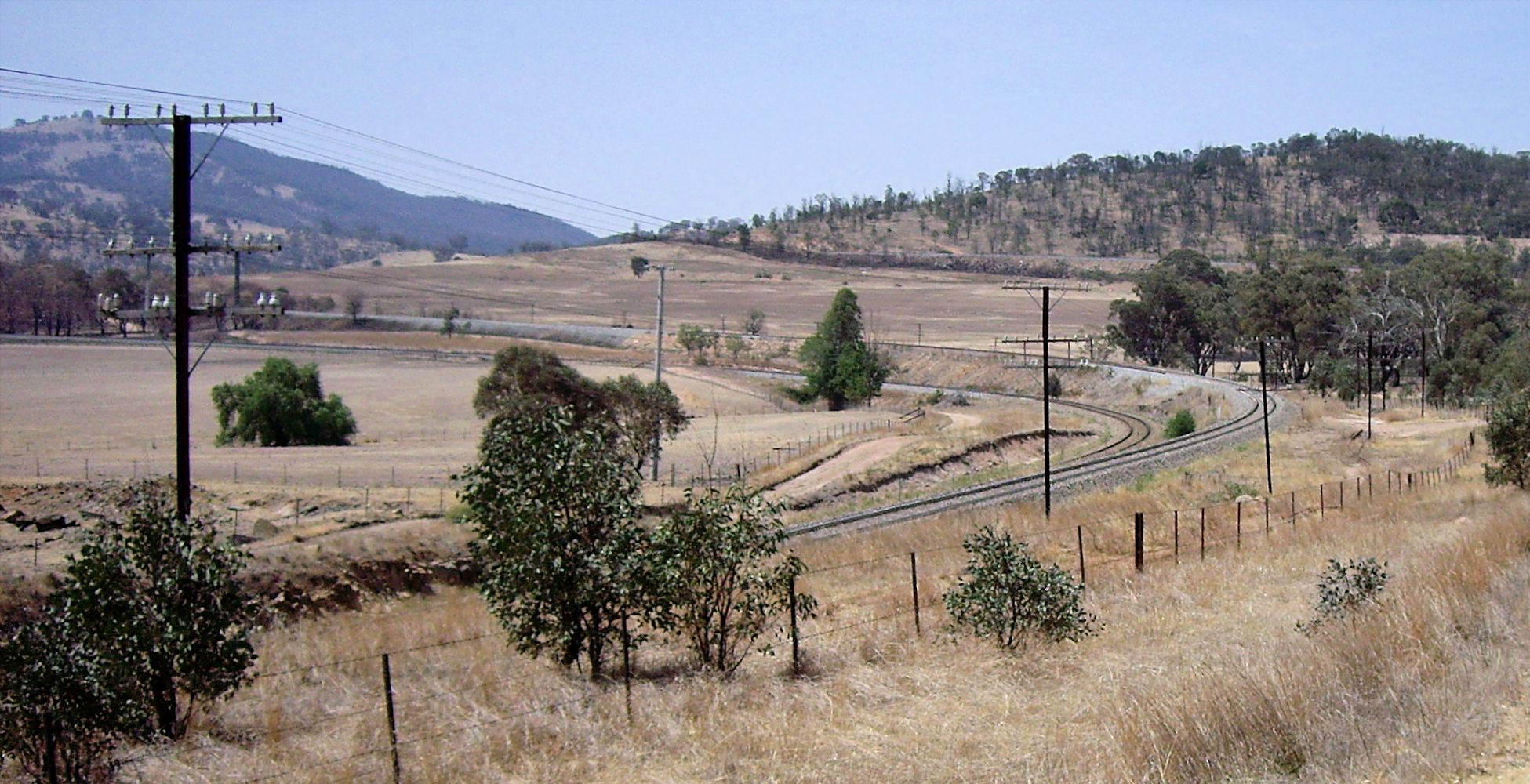
- Tracks diverging at southern end of the spiral; looping track of the spiral on hillside in the middle distance, 2007

- Location within New South Wales Location within Australia
- 34.7498°S 147.8813°E
- Location: Main Southern railway, Bethungra, Junee Shire, New South Wales, Australia

History
- Built: 1946

Site notes
- Owner: Transport Asset Manager of New South Wales

New South Wales Heritage Register
- Official name: Bethungra Spiral
- Type: state heritage (complex / group)
- Designated: 2 April 1999
- Reference no.: 1026
- Type: Other – Transport – Rail
- Category: Transport – Rail

The Bethungra Spiral is a heritage-listed rail spiral on the Main Southern line near Bethungra, between Junee and Cootamundra. The spiral carries the northbound track, forming a part of the Sydney–Melbourne rail corridor.

It is a listed heritage item, having been added to the New South Wales State Heritage Register on 2 April 1999.

== History ==
The original single-track line, opened in 1878, was graded at 1 in 40 for Sydney bound trains, which imposed a severe limitation on train loads, and also caused congestion as bank engines were attached and detached.

When the line was duplicated in the early 1940s, an 8.9 kilometre spiral deviation was built. The spiral makes use of local geography in the shape of a convenient hill around which the uphill ("up", or Sydney-bound) track spirals in order to gain the necessary height over a longer distance, thus giving a lesser gradient. However, the fact that the hill is on the "down" (southbound) side of the original track necessitated two crossings of the original line by the new northbound track — a tunnel to take it to the eastern (or down) side of the original track in order to then spiral around the hill, and a viaduct beyond the spiral to take the new track back to the left hand side of the original line, because Australian trains run on the left, as in the UK, France and Japan. The Spiral has two short tunnels, one already mentioned at the beginning of the Spiral, for the up track to cross beneath the original line to reach the down side, and a second tunnel that allows it to pass over itself at a later point in the Spiral, having circled the hill to gain height.

The Spiral increased the distance travelled by northbound trains by about two kilometres. Southbound trains continue to use the original line. The ruling gradient of the new uphill line is 1 in 66.

Due to the extensive blasting required to create 27-metre deep cuts through granite, the line suffers from rock falls, with twelve significant falls happening between 1960 and 1987. In January 1994, as part of the One Nation project, the Spiral closed for a four-month rebuild, which saw the cuts widened and regraded, including 55-degree benched slopes.

== Description ==
Bethungra Spiral
1 Railway overpass, track to Bethungra Dam
2 Infobox photo taken from here
3 Northbound train passes through two tunnels
4 New lookout platform
5 Steel railway bridge over south line in cutting

Starting at the lower left corner of the interactive map, the up track to Cootamundra (and thence to Sydney) is the one on the left. It diverges from the down track and has been built at a less steep gradient than the down track and so is able to pass under it (through a tunnel) then sweeping around the hill (passing through the second tunnel in the process), gaining elevation all the while until crossing over itself above the second tunnel. It is now higher than the down track and on its right (if northbound), and at an overpass further north (click on "Full screen" to view), crosses back over to the left and eventually the two tracks converge just short of the Olympic Highway level crossing.

== Heritage listing ==
The Bethungra Spiral is of considerable significance, illustrating a means of ascending a significant mountain range providing easier grades than the original line (now the down track). It is a major civil work and an ingenious engineering solution, using the technology available at the time of construction. The site has major landscape value.

Bethungra Spiral was listed on the New South Wales State Heritage Register on 2 April 1999 having satisfied the following criteria:

The place possesses uncommon, rare or endangered aspects of the cultural or natural history of New South Wales.
This item is assessed as historically rare. This item is assessed as scientifically rare. This item is assessed as architecturally rare.

== Tourism ==
A motorist who has just passed through Bethungra township on the way to Cootamundra is alerted to the Spiral nearby by a sign indicating the turnoff to the Rail Spiral Lookout and Bethungra Dam on the right of the Olympic Highway. An all-vehicle dirt road leads, after about 3 km, to a parking area and interpretive signboard. Nearby is a substantial viewing platform from where a Sydney-bound train can be seen emerging from the tunnel and, two minutes later, crossing over that same tunnel.

There are other spots on that road from where three railway tracks can be seen at three different heights on the adjacent hillside to the east of the Olympic Highway. The bottom and top tracks are the up (northbound) track before and after it has crossed the down (southbound) track and traversed the Spiral, while the middle track is the original single-track line, which is now the down (southbound) track.

Aerial photo - Sydney-bound XPT circled

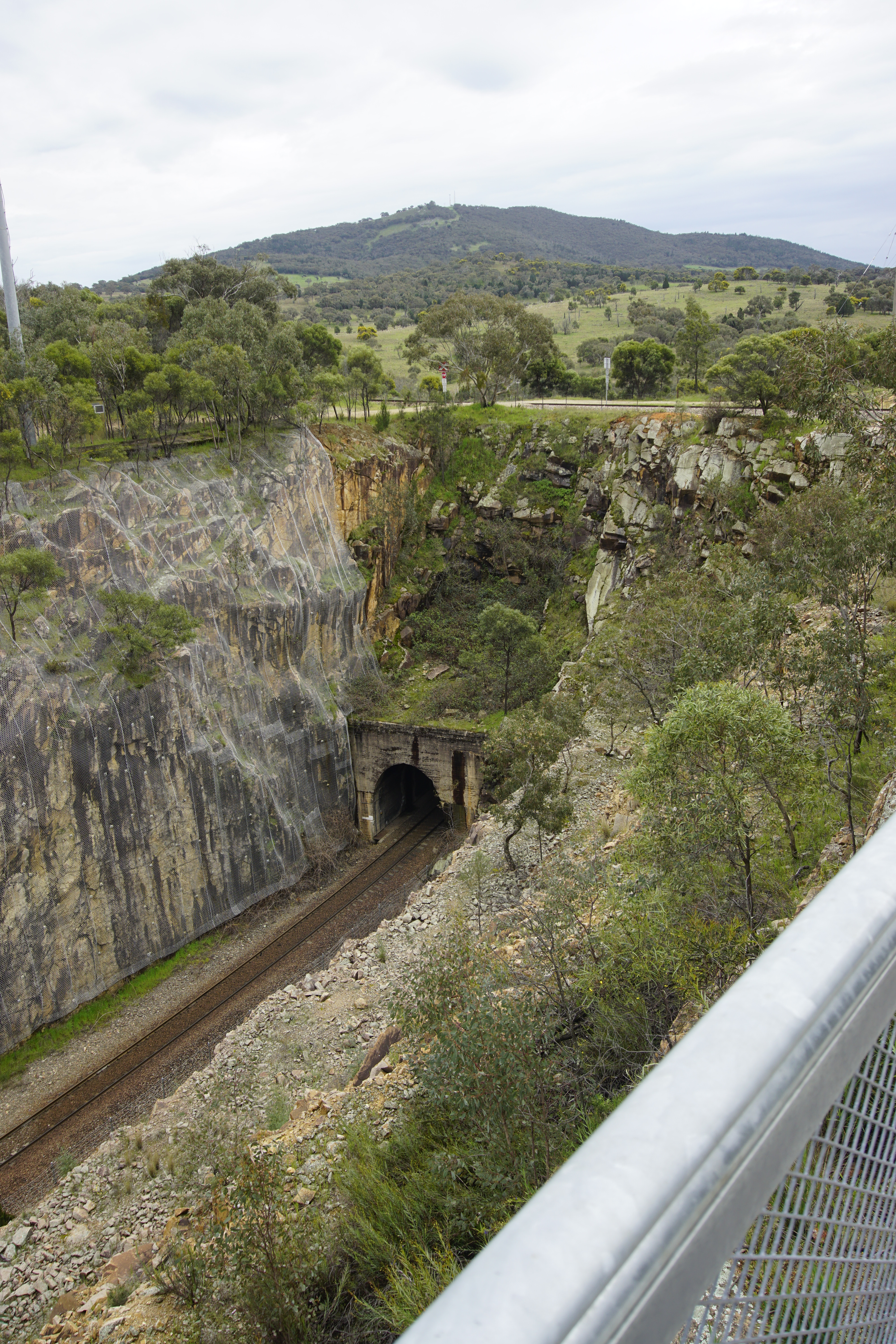
Tunnel and overpass, viewed from lookout, 2022

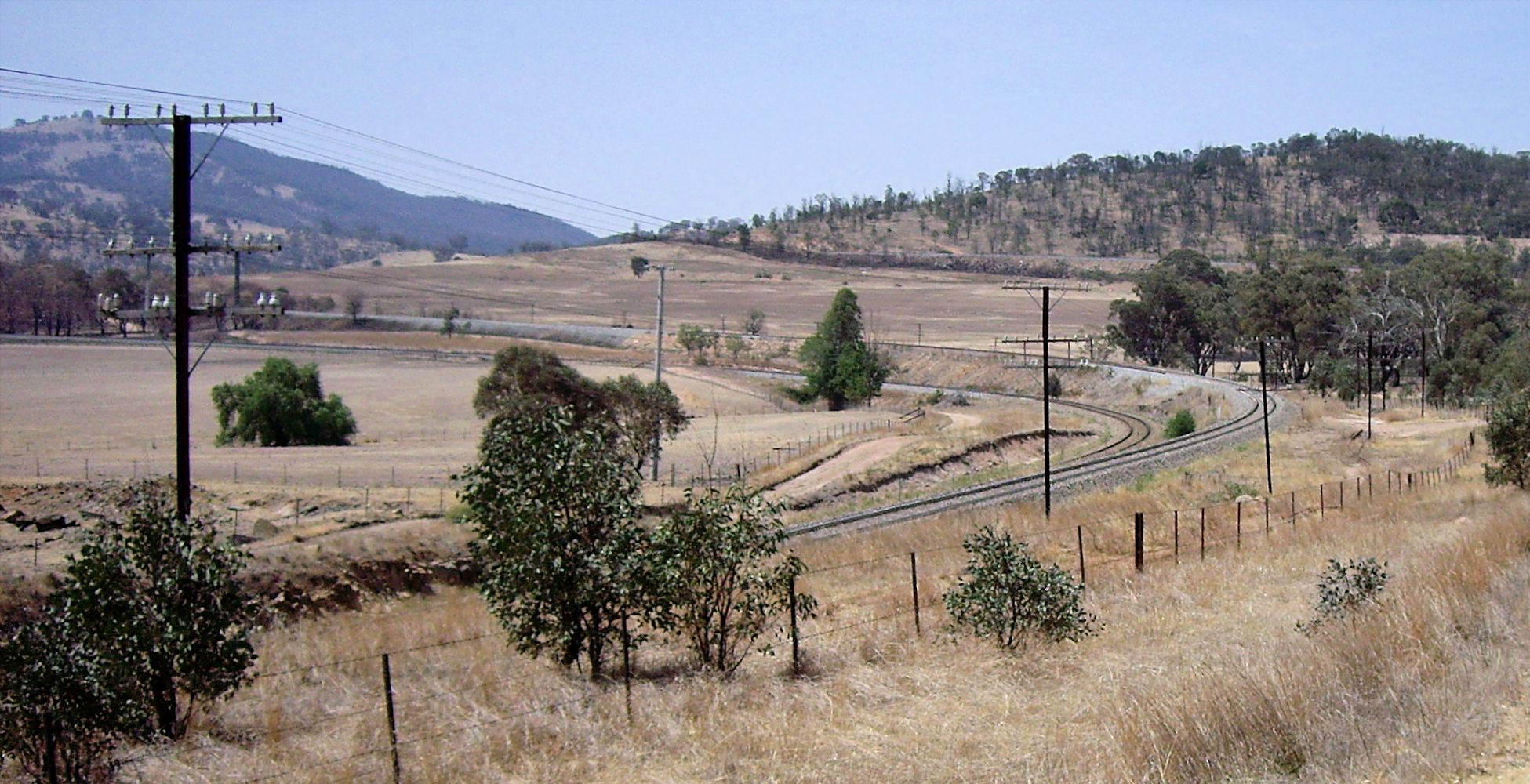
View from Bethungra Dam road

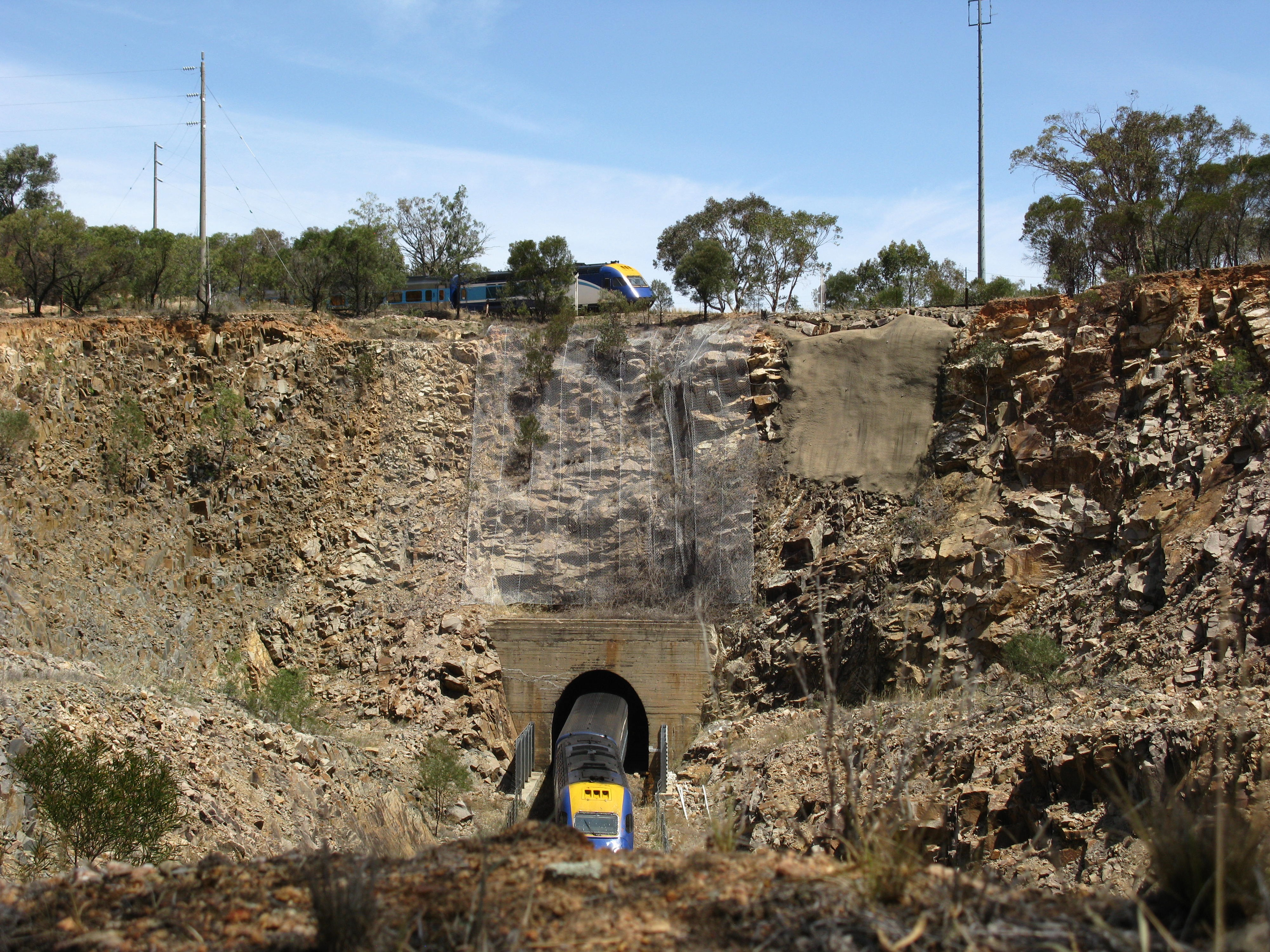
XPT enters tunnel and crosses over, three minutes later (composite photo)

== Inland Rail ==
The route of the proposed Inland Rail entails the construction of a new section of line from Illabo, west of Bethungra, to Stockinbingal, to obviate the need for northbound trains on the Inland Railway to climb the Bethungra Spiral to Cootamundra then drop down to Stockinbingal in order to continue north towards Forbes then Parkes. That section of the Inland Railway is scheduled to be completed by 2025. The Spiral will remain in use as part of the Melbourne-Sydney line.

== Model railway ==
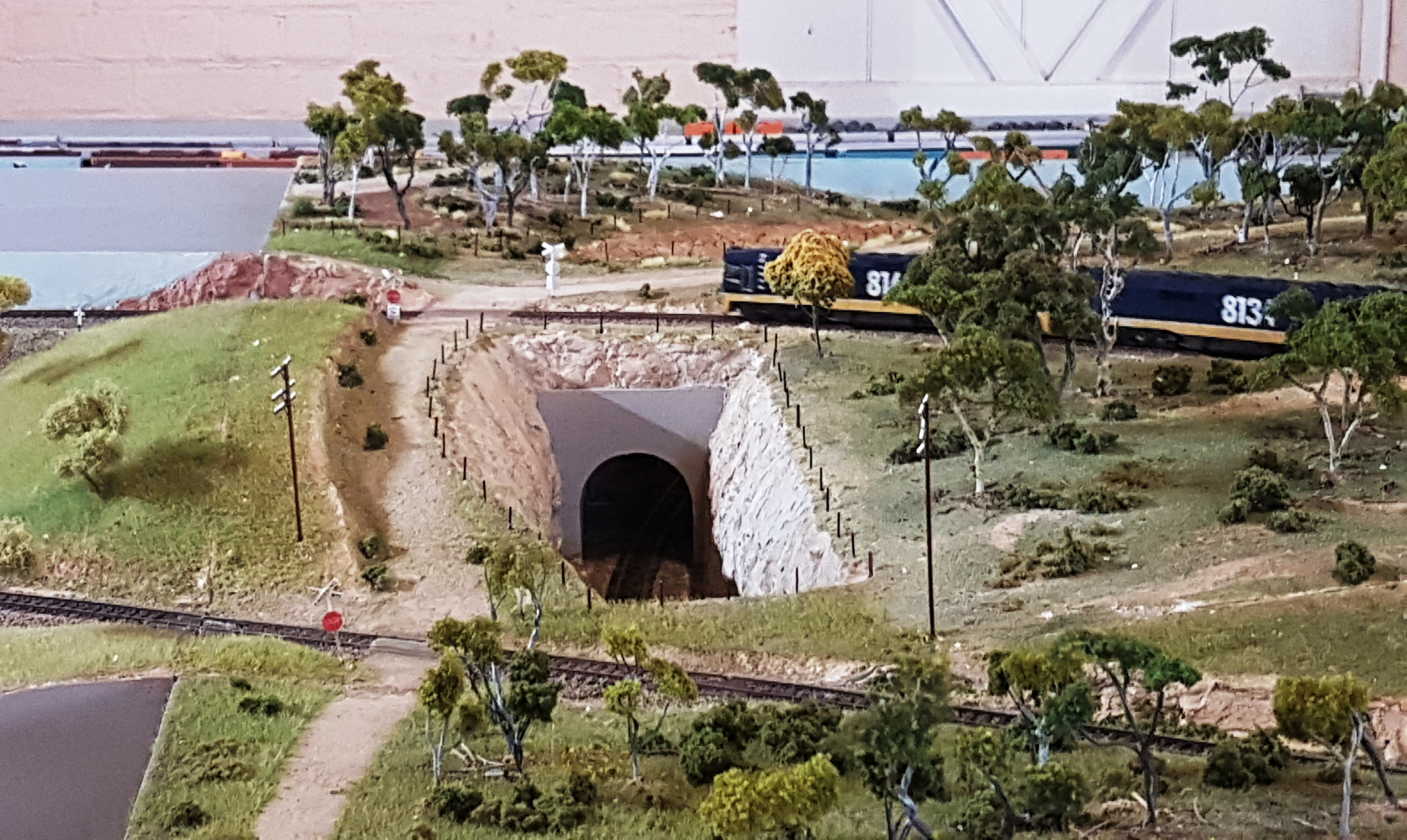
Bethungra Spiral model by Epping Model Railway Club (detail)

The Epping Model Railway Club, based in Epping, New South Wales, has created a detailed model of the Spiral in HO scale. The set-up, which measures approximately 5 by 3 metres (16 ft × 10 ft) is demountable and is occasionally shown as a fully operational exhibit at appropriate functions.

== 2022 derailment ==
Around 0340 on 15 January 2022 ten wagons of a 1,500-metre (4,900 ft)-long freight train left the rails at the highest point of the spiral, above the cutting. The affected wagons did not fall into the cutting, and no injuries were recorded, but the line was out of action for a week while the damaged vehicles were being removed and the track repaired.
