= Bethungra, New South Wales =

Bethungra
- Town
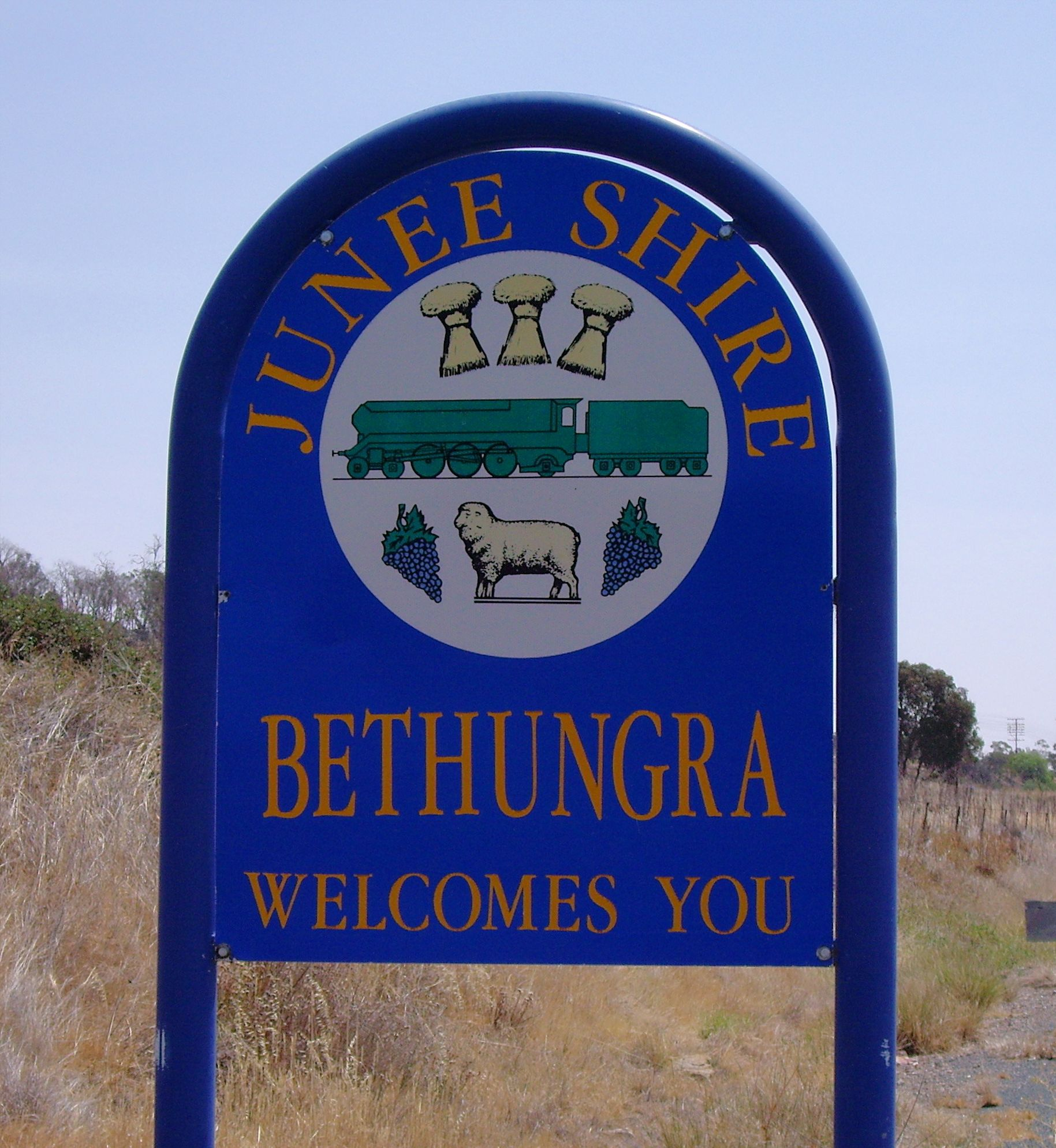
- Entering Bethungra

- Coordinates: 34°46′0″S 147°51′0″E
- Country: Australia
- State: New South Wales
- LGA: Junee Shire
- Location: 400 km (250 mi) from Sydney; 70 km (43 mi) from Wagga Wagga; 24 km (15 mi) from Cootamundra; 10 km (6.2 mi) from Illabo

Government
  - State electorate: Cootamundra
  - Federal division: Riverina
- Elevation: 310 m (1,020 ft)

Population
  - Total: 164 (2016 census)
- Postcode: 2590
- County: Clarendon

Bethungra is a locality in Junee Shire in the South West Slopes region of New South Wales, Australia situated on the Olympic Highway about 13 kilometres northeast of Illabo and 24 kilometres southwest of Cootamundra.

== History ==
Bethungra was officially established when the Post Office opened on 1 December 1875.

Just to the north of the town lies the Bethungra Spiral, a rail spiral built on the Main South railway line to ease the gradients when the line was duplicated between 1941 and 1946. A railway station was located in the town between 1878 and the 1980s, and has now been demolished.

In 1885, an accident occurred near Bethungra when a train derailed at a washed away culvert, killing five persons.

== Heritage listings ==
Bethungra has a number of heritage-listed sites, including:

- Main Southern railway: Bethungra Spiral

== Gallery ==
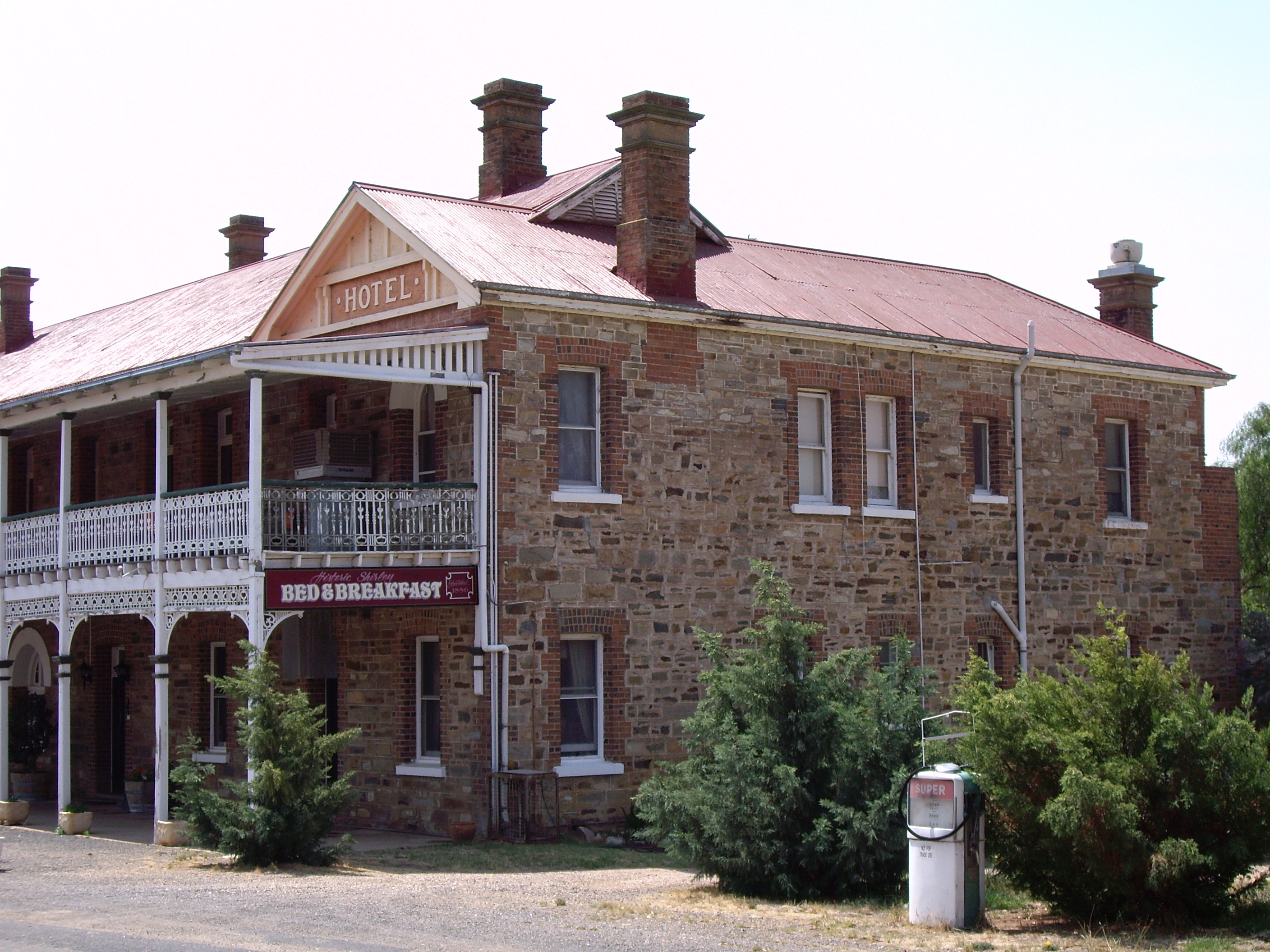
Bethungra Hotel aka Hotel Shirley

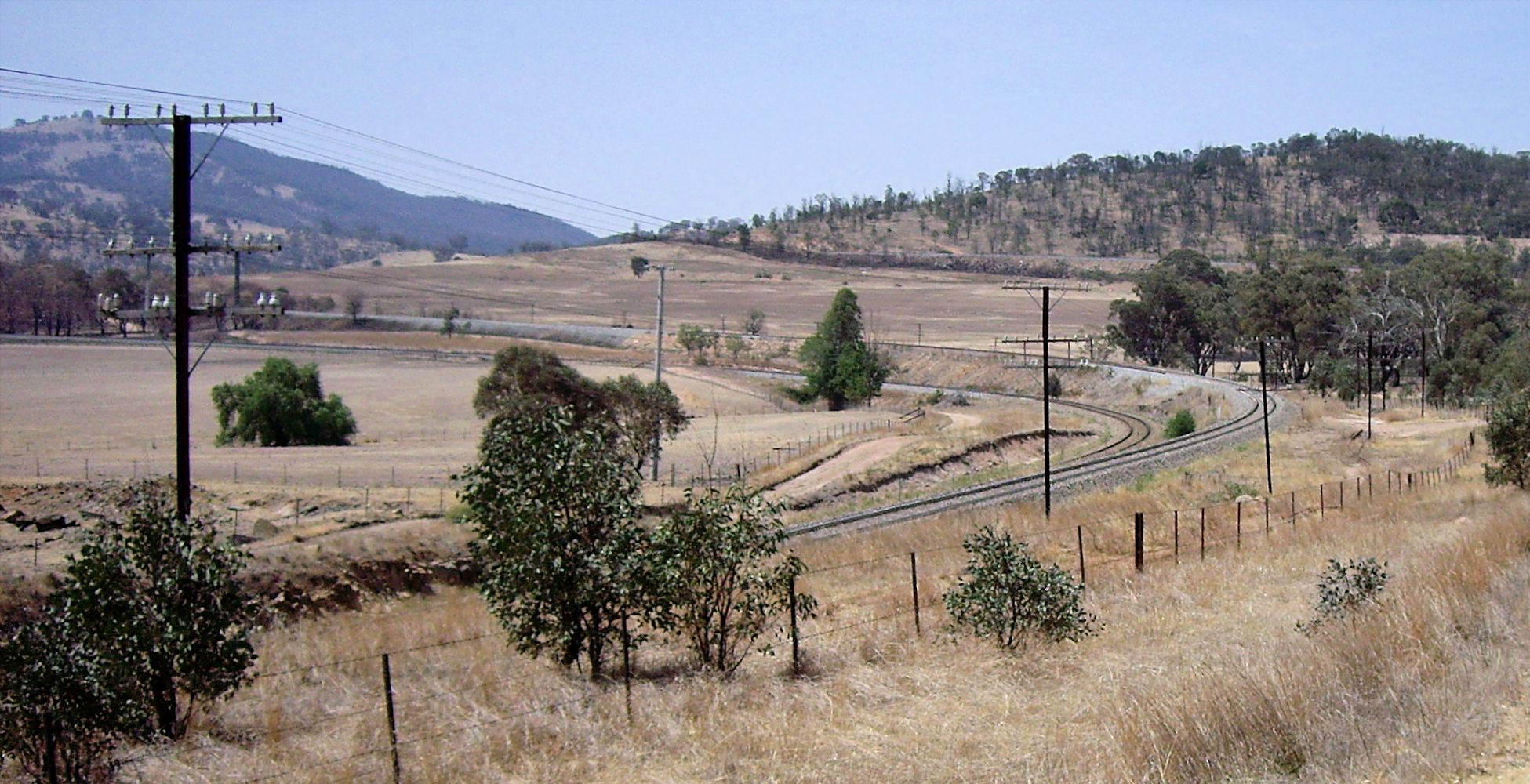
Bethungra Spiral

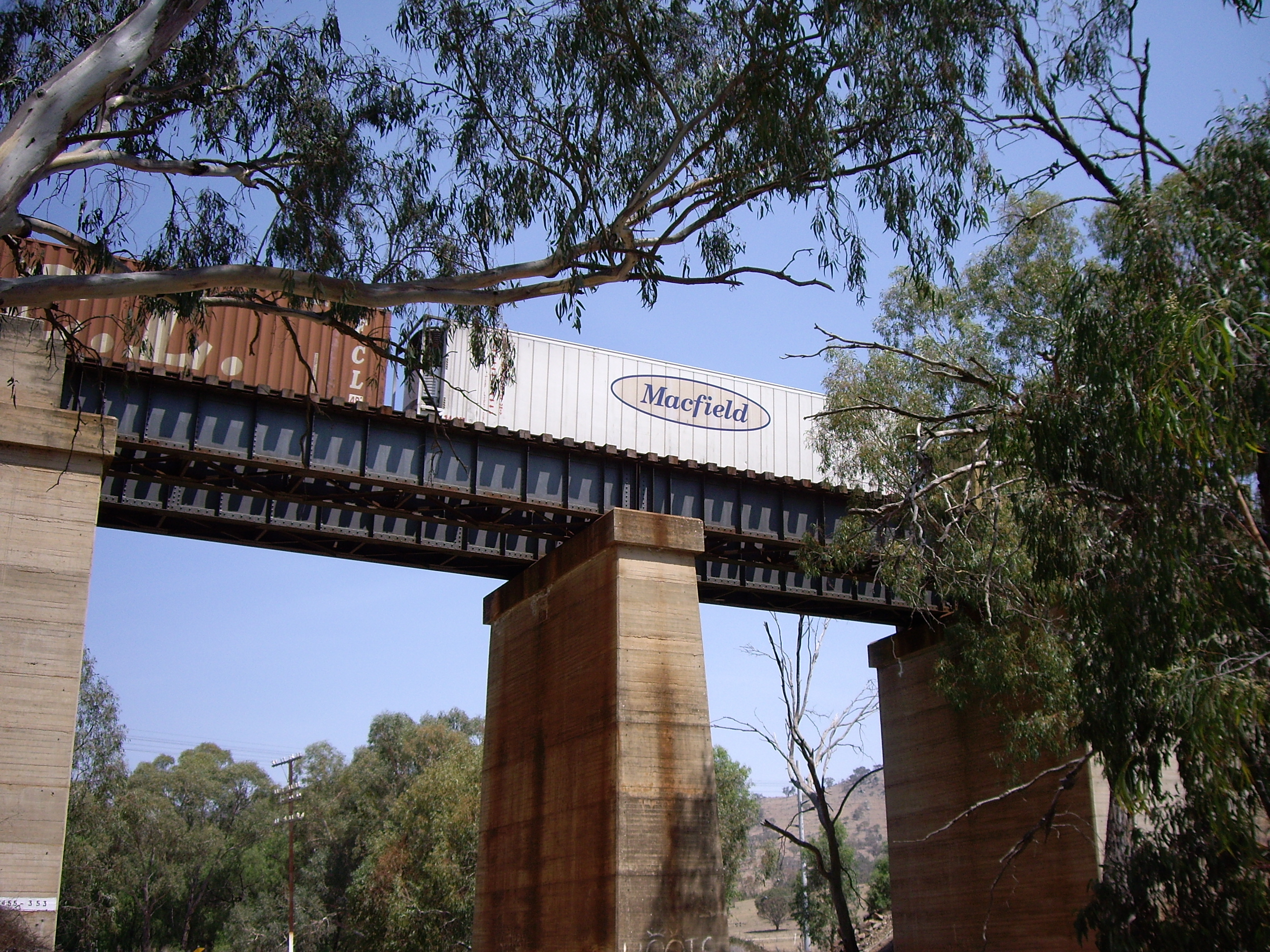
Overpass just south of Bethungra Spiral

| Preceding station | Former services | Following station |
|---|---|---|
| Illabo towards Albury | Main Southern Line | Frampton towards Sydney |
