= Results of the 2016 New South Wales local elections in Riverina =

2016 New South Wales local elections (Riverina)
← 2012	10 September 2016	2017 → 2021 →

This is a list of results for the 2016 New South Wales local elections in the Riverina region.

Riverina covers 14 local government areas (LGAs), including the City of Griffith and the City of Wagga Wagga.

Because of amalgamations undertaken by the state government, only some Riverina LGAs held elections in 2016. Elections for Cootamundra-Gundagai, Edward River, Federation, Murrumbidgee, Murray River and Snowy Valleys took place in 2017.

== Carrathool ==
2016 Carrathool Shire Council election
← 2012	10 September 2016	2021 →

All 11 seats on Carrathool Shire Council 5 seats needed for a majority
- Registered: 1,913
- Turnout: 0.0%
	First party
	IND
Party	Independents
Last election	10 seats
Seats before	10
Seats won	10
Seat change	Steady
First preference vote	0
Percentage	0.0%
- Post-election council composition
Largest party before election
Independents
Largest party after election
Independents

Carrathool Shire Shire composed of two wards, each electing five councillors.

Both wards had exactly five councillors, who were all elected unopposed. A referendum was planned to coincide with the election, but was deferred.

=== Carrathool results ===
2021 New South Wales local elections: Carrathool
Party	Votes	%	Swing	Seats	Change
Independents	0	0.0		10	Steady
Registered voters / turnout	1,913	0.0			

=== A Ward ===
2016 New South Wales local elections: A Ward
Party	Candidate	Votes	%	±%
Independent	David Fensom (elected)	unopposed		
Independent	Darryl Jardine (elected)	unopposed		
Independent	Peter Laird (elected)	unopposed		
Independent	Brett Lewis (elected)	unopposed		
Independent	Geoff Peters (elected)	unopposed		
Registered electors				

=== B Ward ===
2016 New South Wales local elections: B Ward
Party	Candidate	Votes	%	±%
Independent	Mick Armstrong (elected)	unopposed		
Independent	Russell Campbell (elected)	unopposed		
Independent	Bev Furner (elected)	unopposed		
Independent	Scott Groat (elected)	unopposed		
Independent	Bill Kite (elected)	unopposed		
Registered electors				

== Griffith ==
2016 Griffith City Council election
← 2012	10 September 2016	2021 →

All 11 seats on Griffith City Council (Note: Excluding the mayor, who is directly-elected.) 5 seats needed for a majority
- Registered: 16,861
- Turnout: 13,761 (81.61%)
	First party
	IND
Party	Independents
Seats won	11
First preference vote	12,152
Percentage	100.0%
Largest party before election
Independents
Largest party after election
Independents

Griffith City Council is composed of 11 councillors elected proportionally to a single ward, as well as a directly elected mayor.

=== Griffith results ===
2016 New South Wales local elections: Griffith
Party	Candidate	Votes	%	±%
Independent (Group C)	1. Doug Curran (elected 1); 2. Mike Neville (elected 3); 3. Brian Simpson (elected 7); 4. Craig Burley	3,229	26.57	
Independent (Group A)	1. Dino Zappacosta (elected 2); 2. Leon Thorpe	1,281	10.54	
Independent (Group E)	1. Simon Croce (elected 4); 2. John Dal Broi (ineligible)	2,219	18.26	
Independent (Group F)	1. Christine Stead (elected 5); 2. Ricky Chugha	1,156	9.51	
Independent (Group D)	1. Anne Napoli (elected 6); 2. Deb Longhurst (elected 10); 3. Rina Mercuri (elected 11)	1,553	12.78	
Independent (Group B)	1. Paul Snaidero (elected 8); 2. Edwin Mardon (elected 9); 3. Andy Armstrong; 4. Michele Devery	1,589	13.08	
Independent	Paul Rossetto	469	3.86	
Independent	Tom Mackerras	294	2.42	
Independent (Group G)	1. George Youssef; 2. Mohannad Suleiman	226	1.86	
Independent	Max Buljubasic	81	0.67	
Independent	Lance Perry	34	0.28	
Independent	Franz Krogh	21	0.17	
Total formal votes		12,152	88.31	
Informal votes		1,609	11.69	
Turnout		13,761	81.61	

=== Griffith mayor ===
2016 Griffith mayoral election
← 2012	10 September 2016	2021 →

Mayor of the City of Griffith
- Registered: 16,861
- Turnout: 13,746 (81.53%)
	First party	Second party	Third party
	IND	IND	IND
Candidate	John Dal Broi	Doug Curran	Mike Neville
Party	Independent	Independent	Independent
First preference vote	4,147	3,721	2,262
Percentage	31.29%	28.07%	17.07%
TCP	50.61%	49.39%
Mayor before election
John Dal Broi
Independent
Mayor after election
John Dal Broi
Independent

In the mayoral election, independent incumbent John Dal Broi was re-elected.

2016 New South Wales mayoral elections: Griffith
Party	Candidate	Votes	%	±%
Independent	John Dal Broi	4,147	31.29	
Independent	Doug Curran	3,721	28.07	
Independent	Mike Neville	2,262	17.07	
Independent	Dino Zappacosta	1,716	12.95	
Independent	Paul Snaidero	1,409	10.63	
Total formal votes		13,255	96.43	
Informal votes		491	3.57	
Turnout		13,746	81.53	
Two-candidate-preferred result
Independent	John Dal Broi	4,931	50.61	
Independent	Doug Curran	4,813	49.39	
John Dal Broi hold				

== Hay ==
2016 Hay Shire Council election
← 2012	10 September 2016	2021 →

All 8 seats on Hay Shire Council 5 seats needed for a majority
- Registered: 2,180
- Turnout: 1,769 (81.15%)
	First party
	IND
Party	Independents
Last election	8 seats
Seats before	8
Seats won	8
Seat change	Steady
First preference vote	1,735
Percentage	100.0%
Largest party before election
Independents
Largest party after election
Independents

=== Hay results ===
2016 New South Wales local elections: Hay
Party	Candidate	Votes	%	±%
Independent	Bill Sheaffe (elected 1)	320	18.44	
Independent	Kevin Walter (elected 2)	250	14.41	
Independent	Peter Dwyer (elected 3)	199	11.47	
Independent	Jasen Crighton (elected 4)	174	10.03	
Independent	Michael Rutledge (elected 5)	136	7.84	
Independent	Dave Townsend (elected 6)	162	9.34	
Independent	Robert Howard (elected 7)	128	7.38	
Independent	Jenny Dwyer (elected 8)	72	4.15	
Independent	Garry May	58	3.34	
Independent	Jade Auldist	69	3.98	
Independent	Roger McGrath	47	2.71	
Independent	Jamie Woods	42	2.42	
Independent	Jill Chapman	39	2.25	
Independent	Lionel Garner	39	2.25	
Total formal votes		1,735	98.08	
Informal votes		34	1.92	
Turnout		1,769	81.15	

== Junee ==
2016 Junee Shire Council election
← 2012	10 September 2016	2021 →

All 9 seats on Junee Shire Council 5 seats needed for a majority
- Registered: 3,898
- Turnout: 3,124 (80.14%)
	First party	Second party
	IND	IND
Party	Independents	Ind. National
Last election	8 seats	1 seat
Seats before	8	1
Seats won	8	1
Seat change	Steady	Steady
First preference vote	2,555	456
Percentage	84.86%	15.14%
Largest party before election
Independents
Largest party after election
Independents

=== Junee results ===
2016 New South Wales local elections: Junee
Party	Candidate	Votes	%	±%
Independent	Neil Smith (elected 1)	583	19.36	
Independent	Pam Halliburton (elected 2)	486	16.14	
Independent National	Matt Austin (elected 3)	456	15.14	
Independent	Robin Asmus (elected 4)	262	8.70	
Independent	Kerri Walker (elected 5)	222	7.37	
Independent	David Carter (elected 6)	210	6.97	
Independent	Mark Cook (elected 7)	169	5.61	
Independent	Bob Callow (elected 8)	141	4.68	
Independent	Martin Holmes (elected 9)	125	4.15	
Independent	Linda Calis	74	2.46	
Independent	Colin Randall	94	3.12	
Independent	Andrew Clinton	83	2.76	
Independent	Joseph Costello	78	2.59	
Independent	Arron Smith	28	0.93	
Total formal votes		3,011	96.38	
Informal votes		113	3.62	
Turnout		3,124	80.14	

== Leeton ==
2016 Leeton Shire Council election
← 2012 ← 2012	10 September 2016	2021 →

All 9 seats on Leeton Shire Council 5 seats needed for a majority
- Registered: 7,720
- Turnout: 6,368 (82.49%)
	First party	Second party
	IND	IND
Party	Independents	Ind. Labor
Last election	7 seats	1 seat
Seats before	8	1
Seats won	8	1
Seat change	Steady	Steady
First preference vote	5,756	370
Percentage	93.96%	6.04%
Largest party before election
Independents
Largest party after election
Independents

=== Leeton results ===
2016 New South Wales local elections: Leeton
Party	Candidate	Votes	%	±%
Independent	Paul Maytom (elected 1)	2,374	38.75	
Independent	George Weston (elected 2)	319	5.21	
Independent	Paul Smith (elected 3)	506	8.26	
Independent	Tony Reneker (elected 4)	479	7.82	
Independent	Tracey Morris (elected 5)	317	5.17	
Independent Labor	Michael Kidd (elected 6)	370	6.04	
Independent	Tony Ciccia (elected 7)	387	6.32	
Independent	Sandra Nardi (elected 8)	338	5.52	
Independent	Peter Davidson (elected 9)	188	3.07	
Independent	Emerson Doig	177	2.89	
Independent	Michael Ierano	209	3.41	
Independent	Patty Bowles	142	2.32	
Independent	William Barwick	126	2.06	
Independent	Maryann Vitelli	112	1.83	
Independent	Arnah Garwood	82	1.34	
Total formal votes		6,126	96.20	
Informal votes		242	3.80	
Turnout		6,368	82.49	

== Lockhart ==
2016 Lockhart Shire Council election
← 2012	10 September 2016	2021 →

All 9 seats on Lockhart Shire Council 5 seats needed for a majority
- Registered: 1,545
- Turnout: 1,210 (78.32%)
	First party
	IND
Party	Independents
Last election	9 seats
Seats before	9
Seats won	9
Seat change	Steady
First preference vote	1,181
Percentage	100.0%
Largest party before election
Independents
Largest party after election
Independents

Lockhart Shire Council composed of three wards, each electing three councillors. The election in C Ward was uncontested.

=== Lockhart results ===
2021 New South Wales local elections: Carrathool
Party	Votes	%	Swing	Seats	Change
Independents	1,181	100.0		9	Steady
Formal votes					
Informal votes					
Total					
Registered voters / turnout					

=== A Ward ===
2016 New South Wales local elections: A Ward
Party	Candidate	Votes	%	±%
Independent	Rodger Schirmer (elected 1)	338	55.32	
Independent	Max Day (elected 2)	114	18.66	
Independent	Andrew Rockliff (elected 3)	103	16.86	
Independent	Philip Bouffler	56	9.17	
Total formal votes		611	98.23	
Informal votes		11	1.77	
Turnout		622	80.88	

=== B Ward ===
2016 New South Wales local elections: B Ward
Party	Candidate	Votes	%	±%
Independent	Derek Douglas (elected 1)	199	34.91	
Independent	Peter Sharp (elected 2)	185	32.46	
Independent	James Walker (elected 3)	151	26.49	
Independent	Leia Thiele	35	6.14	
Total formal votes		570	96.94	
Informal votes		18	3.06	
Turnout		588	75.77	

=== C Ward ===
2016 New South Wales local elections: C Ward
Party	Candidate	Votes	%	±%
Independent	Gail Driscoll (elected)	unopposed	n/a	n/a
Independent	Ian Marston (elected)	unopposed	n/a	n/a
Independent	Greg Verdon (elected)	unopposed	n/a	n/a
Registered electors				

== Narrandera ==
2016 Narrandera Shire Council election
← 2012	10 September 2016	2021 →

All 9 seats on Narrandera Shire Council 5 seats needed for a majority
- Registered: 4,349
- Turnout: 3,496 (80.39%)
	First party
	IND
Party	Independents
Last election	9 seats
Seats before	9
Seats won	9
Seat change	Steady
First preference vote	3,371
Percentage	100%
Largest party before election
Independents
Largest party after election
Independents

=== Narrandera results ===
2016 New South Wales local elections: Narrandera
Party	Candidate	Votes	%	±%
Independent	Jenny Clarke (elected 1)	567	16.82	
Independent	Tracey Lewis (elected 2)	492	14.60	
Independent	Kevin Morris (elected 3)	337	10.00	
Independent	Barbara Bryon (elected 4)	292	8.66	
Independent	David Fahey (elected 5)	277	8.22	
Independent	Neville Kschenka (elected 6)	211	6.26	
Independent	Wesley Hall (elected 7)	151	4.48	
Independent	Tammy Galvin (elected 8)	137	4.06	
Independent	Narelle Payne (elected 9)	119	3.53	
Independent	Cameron Lander	140	4.15	
Independent	Michelle Henderson	123	3.65	
Independent	Robert Manning	94	2.79	
Independent	Des Edwards	94	2.79	
Independent	David Marwood	81	2.40	
Independent	Anthony French	73	2.17	
Independent	Anthony Marsh	72	2.14	
Independent	Scott Mitchell	61	1.81	
Independent	Barry Mayne	36	1.07	
Independent	Zuzana Crook	14	0.42	
Total formal votes		3,371	96.42	
Informal votes		125	3.58	
Turnout		3,496	80.39	

== Temora ==
2016 Temora Shire Council election
← 2012	10 September 2016	2021 →

All 9 seats on Temora Shire Council 5 seats needed for a majority
- Registered: 4,607
- Turnout: 3,916 (85.00%)
	First party	Second party
	IND	IND
Party	Independents	Ind. National
Last election	7 seats	2 seat
Seats before	7	2
Seats won	7	2
Seat change	Steady	Steady
First preference vote	1,377	2,439
Percentage	36.08%	63.92%
Largest party before election
Independents
Largest party after election
Independents

=== Temora results ===
2016 New South Wales local elections: Temora
Party	Candidate	Votes	%	±%
Independent National	Rick Firman (elected 1)	2,277	59.67	
Independent National	Graham Sinclair (elected 2)	162	4.25	
Independent	Lindy Reinhold (elected 3)	198	5.19	
Independent	Nigel Judd (elected 4)	197	5.16	
Independent	Max Oliver (elected 5)	110	2.88	
Independent	Claire McLaren (elected 6)	207	5.42	
Independent	Kenneth Smith (elected 7)	138	3.62	
Independent	Dale Wiencke (elected 8)	97	2.54	
Independent	Dennis Sleigh (elected 9)	75	1.97	
Independent	Irene Broad	78	2.04	
Independent	Les Buckley	85	2.23	
Independent	Jone Pavelic	70	1.83	
Independent	Trevor Colwill	47	1.23	
Independent	Andrew Robbins	30	0.79	
Independent	Garath Otley	31	0.81	
Independent	Chris Lasdauskas	14	0.37	
Total formal votes		3,816	97.45	
Informal votes		100	2.55	
Turnout		3,916	85.00	

== Wagga Wagga ==
2016 Wagga Wagga City Council election
← 2012	10 September 2016	2021 →

All 9 seats on Wagga Wagga City Council 5 seats needed for a majority
- Registered: 44,131
- Turnout: 35,545 (80.54%)

	First party	Second party	Third party
	IND
Leader	N/A	Dan Hayes	Kevin Poynter
Party	Independents	Country Labor	Greens
Last election	8 seats	0 seats	1 seat
Seats before	8	0	1
Seats won	7	2	0
Seat change	▼1	▲2	▼1
First preference vote	24,766	5,670	1,447
Percentage	74.24%	17.00%	4.34%
Largest party before election
Independents
Largest party after election
Independents

=== Wagga Wagga results ===
2016 New South Wales local elections: Wagga Wagga
Party	Candidate	Votes	%	±%
Independent	1. Rod Kendall (elected 1); 2. Tim Koschel (elected 5); 3. David Merlino; 4. Donna Argus; 5. Paul Watson; 6. Leila Bright; 7. Robyn Krik	6,840	20.50	
Country Labor	1. Dan Hayes (elected 2); 2. Vanessa Keenan (elected 8); 3. Leah Ellis; 4. Bethany Saab; 5. James Halliburton	5,670	17.00	
Independent	1. Kerry Pascoe (elected 3); 2. Michelle Bray; 3. Belinda Coleman; 4. Tim Sheather; 5. Steven Wait	4,540	13.61	
Independent	1. Paul Funnell (elected 4); 2. Tina Gavel; 3. Jack Egan; 4. Mick Henderson; 5. Denise Flack	4,545	13.62	
Independent	1. Yvonne Braid (elected 6); 2. Greg Packer; 3. Simone Lieschke; 4. Brett Grant; 5. Myriam Hribar	1,882	5.64	
Independent	Greg Conkey (elected 7)	1,181	3.54	
Independent	Dallas Tout (elected 9)	876	2.63	
Independent	1. Andreia Schineanu; 2. Atlanta Hall; 3. Bianca Miller; 4. Kerri-Anne Miller; 5. Jenni Campbell	1,653	4.96	
Greens	1. Kevin Poynter; 2. Jacquie Tinkler; 3. Emma Rush; 4. Michael Bayles; 5. Ray Goodlass	1,447	4.34	
Australia First	1. Lorraine Sharp; 2. Robbie Williams; 3. Jean Williams; 4. Chris Sharp; 5. Jean Huges	1,476	4.42	
Independent	Alan Brown	584	1.75	
Independent	Mary Kidson	546	1.64	
Independent	Simone Eyles	413	1.24	
Independent	Richard Foley	506	1.52	
Independent	Peter Dale	435	1.30	
Independent	Anabel Williams	395	1.18	
Independent	1. Ros Prangnell; 2. Patricia Murray	223	0.67	
Independent	Peter Templeton	147	0.44	
Total formal votes		33,359	93.85	
Informal votes		2,186	6.15	
Turnout		35,545	80.54	
