= Results of the 2021 New South Wales local elections in Riverina =

2021 New South Wales local elections (Riverina)
← 2016 ← 2017	14 September 2024	2024 →

This is a list of results for the 2021 New South Wales local elections in the Riverina region.

Riverina covers 14 local government areas (LGAs), including the City of Griffith and the City of Wagga Wagga.

== Bland ==
2021 New South Wales local elections: Bland
Party	Candidate	Votes	%	±%
Independent	Brian Monaghan (elected)	913	28.4	
Independent	Elizabeth McGlynn (elected)	405	12.6	
Independent	Kerron Keatley (elected)	399	12.4	
Independent	Rodney Crowe (elected)	339	10.6	
Independent	Roger Moore (elected)	256	8.0	
Independent	Jill Funnell (elected)	201	6.3	
Independent Labor	Tony Lord (elected)	201	6.3	
Independent	Bruce Baker (elected)	196	6.1	
Independent	Monica Clark (elected)	176	5.5	
Independent	Bradley Staniforth	125	3.9	
Total formal votes		3,211	96.1	
Informal votes		131	3.9	
Turnout		3,342	80.7	

== Carrathool ==
2021 Carrathool Shire Council election
← 2016	4 December 2021	2024 →

All 10 seats on Carrathool Shire Council 6 seats needed for a majority
- Turnout: 39.56%
	First party
	IND
Party	Independents
Last election	10 seats
Seats before	10
Seats won	10
Seat change	Steady
First preference vote	694
Percentage	100.0%
Swing	▲0.0
- Post-election council composition
Largest party before election
Independents
Subsequent largest party
Independents

Carrathool Shire Council is composed of two five-member wards. Like in 2016, every single candidate was an independent without any political party membership.

=== Carrathool results ===
2021 New South Wales local elections: Carrathool
Party	Votes	%	Swing	Seats	Change
Independents	694	100.0	+0.0	10	Steady
Formal votes	694	97.9			
Informal votes	15	2.1			
Total	709	100.00			
Registered voters / turnout	1,792	39.56			

=== A Ward ===
2021 New South Wales local elections: A Ward
Party	Candidate	Votes	%	±%
Independent	Darryl Jardine (elected)	235	33.9	
Independent	Heather Lyall (elected)	147	21.2	
Independent	Geoff Peters (elected)	73	10.5	
Independent	David Fensom (elected)	72	10.4	
Independent	Julie Potter (elected)	70	10.1	
Independent	Allan Hutchison	52	7.5	
Independent	Anne Moore	45	6.5	
Total formal votes		694	97.9	
Informal votes		15	2.1	
Turnout		709	78.3	

=== B Ward ===
2021 New South Wales local elections: B Ward
Party	Candidate	Votes	%	±%
Independent	Mick Armstrong (elected)	unopposed		
Independent	Leon Cashmere (elected)	unopposed		
Independent	Beverley Furner (elected)	unopposed		
Independent	William Kite (elected)	unopposed		
Independent	Damon Liddicoat (elected)	unopposed		
Registered electors		887		

== Coolamon ==
2021 Coolamon Shire Council election
← 2016	4 December 2021	2024 →

All 9 seats on Coolamon Shire Council 5 seats needed for a majority
	First party	Second party	Third party
	IND	SFF	IND
Party	Independents	SFF	Ind. National
Seats won	7	1	1
First preference vote	2,053	413	110
Percentage	79.7%	16.0%	4.3%
Largest party before election
Independents
Subsequent largest party
Independents

Coolamon Shire Council is composed of nine councillors elected proportionally to a single ward.

Independent councillor Jeremy Crocker joined the Shooters, Fishers and Farmers Party in October 2017 and contested the election as an endorsed candidate.

The previous election, in September 2016, was uncontested. Bronwyn Hatty, Trevor Jose, Wayne Lewis and Garth Perkin contested this election for the first time.

=== Coolamon results ===
2021 New South Wales local elections: Coolamon
Party	Candidate	Votes	%	±%
Independent	Bronwyn Hatty (elected)	638	24.77	
Shooters, Fishers, Farmers	Jeremy Crocker (elected)	413	16.03	
Independent	Colin McKinnon (elected)	286	11.10	
Independent	David McCann (elected)	266	10.33	
Independent	Kathy Maslin (elected)	265	10.29	
Independent	Alan White (elected)	212	8.23	
Independent	Bruce Hutcheon (elected)	185	7.18	
Independent	Trevor Jose	118	4.58	
Independent National	Wayne Lewis (elected)	110	4.27	
Independent	Garth Perkin (elected)	82	3.22	
Total formal votes		2,576	96.4	
Informal votes		97	3.63	
Turnout		2,673	82.53	

== Cootamundra–Gundagai ==
2021 Cootamundra–Gundagai Regional Council election
← 2017	4 December 2021	2024 →

All 9 seats on Cootamundra–Gundagai Regional Council 5 seats needed for a majority
	First party	Second party	Third party
	IND	IND	IND
Party	Independents	Ind. Labor	Ind. National
Seats before	8	1	0
Seats won	7	1	1
Seat change	▼1	Steady	▲1
First preference vote	5,915	963	444
Percentage	85.5%	13.9%	6.4%
Largest party before election
Independents
Subsequent largest party
Independents

Cootamundra–Gundagai Regional Council is composed of nine councillors elected proportionally to a single ward.

Logan Collins was elected at the age of 18, becoming the youngest local councillor in New South Wales history.

=== Cootamundra–Gundagai results ===
2021 New South Wales local elections: Cootamundra–Gundagai
Party	Candidate	Votes	%	±%
Independent	Abb McAlister (elected)	1,424	20.6	
Independent Labor	Charlie Sheahan (elected)	963	13.9	
Independent	Gil Kelly (elected)	901	13.0	
Independent	Les Boyd (elected)	753	10.9	
Independent	Leigh Bowden (elected)	605	8.7	
Independent	Penny Nicholson (elected)	451	6.5	
Independent National	Logan Collins (elected)	444	6.4	
Independent	Trevor Glover (elected)	417	6.0	
Independent	David Ferguson	358	5.2	
Independent	David Graham (elected)	269	3.9	
Independent	Rosalind Wight	210	3.0	
Independent	Maxine Hayes	127	1.8	
Total formal votes		6,922	95.7	
Informal votes		310	4.3	
Turnout		7,232	84.1	

== Griffith ==
Elected councillor	Party
Laurie Testoni	Independent (Group B)
Shari Blumer	Independent (Group B)
Chris Sutton	Chris Sutton Team
Melissa Marin	Chris Sutton Team
Anne Napoli	Anne Napoli Group
Dino Zappacosta	Independent (Group D)
Manjit Singh Lally	Independent (Group D)
Simon Croce	Independent (Group C)
Jenny Ellis	Independent
Christine Stead	Independent (Group E)

2021 New South Wales local elections: Griffith
Party	Candidate	Votes	%	±%
Independent (Group B)		3,589	28.6	
Chris Sutton Team		2,580	20.5	
Anne Napoli Group		1,850	14.7	
Independent (Group D)		1,171	9.3	
Independent (Group C)		779	6.2	
Independent (Group E)		664	5.3	
Independent	Jenny Ellis	536	4.3	
Independent (Group G)		530	4.2	
Independent	Rina Mercuri	445	3.5	
Independent	Michael Crump	334	2.7	
Independent	Robert Campbell	78	0.6	
Total formal votes		12,556	84.8	
Informal votes		2,250	15.2	
Turnout		14,806	88.1	

== Hay ==
2021 New South Wales local elections: Hay
Party	Candidate	Votes	%	±%
Independent	Jenny Dwyer (elected)	491	28.1	
Independent	Martyn Quinn (elected)	264	15.1	
Independent	Peter Handford (elected)	198	11.3	
Independent	Peter Dwyer (elected)	190	10.9	
Independent	Carol Oataway (elected)	117	6.7	
Independent	Lionel Garner (elected)	103	5.9	
Independent	Geoff Chapman (elected)	90	5.2	
Independent	John Perry	64	3.7	
Independent	Darren Clarke	62	3.5	
Independent	Paul Porter (elected)	57	3.3	
Independent	Beverley McRae	48	2.7	
Independent	David Townsend	33	1.9	
Independent	Megan Ruska	30	1.7	
Total formal votes		1,747	97.4	
Informal votes		47	2.6	
Turnout		1,794	83.6	

== Junee ==
2021 New South Wales local elections: Junee
Party	Candidate	Votes	%	±%
Independent	Neil Smith (elected)	795	24.4	
Independent National	Pam Halliburton (elected)	476	14.6	
Independent National	Matt Austin (elected)	433	13.3	
Independent	David Carter (elected)	303	9.3	
Independent	Andrew Clinton (elected)	253	7.8	
Independent	Robin Asmus (elected)	180	5.5	
Independent	Mark Cook (elected)	179	5.5	
Independent	Marie Knight (elected)	160	4.9	
Independent	Anna Lashbrook	158	4.8	
Independent	Maggie Salisbury	108	3.3	
Independent	Bob Callow (elected)	107	3.3	
Independent	Linda Calis	57	1.7	
Independent	Robert Minister	53	1.3	
Total formal votes		3,262	95.9	
Informal votes		138	4.1	
Turnout		3,400	85.1	

== Leeton ==
2021 Leeton Shire Council election
← 2016	4 December 2021	2024 →

All 9 seats on Leeton Shire Council 5 seats needed for a majority
- Registered: 7,698
- Turnout: 6,354 (82.54%)
	First party	Second party
	IND	IND
Party	Independents	Ind. Labor
Last election	8 seats	1 seat
Seats before	8	1
Seats won	8	1
Seat change	Steady	Steady
First preference vote	5,597	508
Percentage	91.68%	8.32%
Largest party before election
Independents
Subsequent largest party
Independents

Leeton Shire Council is composed of nine councillors elected proportionally to a single ward.

Tony Reneker became mayor following the election, with Michael Kidd serving as deputy mayor.

=== Leeton results ===
2021 New South Wales local elections: Leeton
Party	Candidate	Votes	%	±%
Independent	Paul Smith (elected)	845	13.84	+5.58
Independent	George Weston (elected)	628	10.29	+5.08
Independent	Tony Reneker (elected)	823	13.48	+5.66
Independent	Krystal Maytom (elected)	548	8.98	+8.98
Independent	Tony Ciccia (elected)	512	8.39	+2.07
Independent	Sandra Nardi (elected)	530	8.68	+3.16
Independent Labor	Michael Kidd (elected)	508	8.32	+2.28
Independent	Tracy Morris (elected)	345	5.65	+0.48
Independent	Matthew Holt (elected)	308	5.05	+5.05
Independent	Brian Conroy	210	3.44	+3.44
Independent	Patricia Bowles	190	3.11	+0.79
Independent	Daryl Odewahn	176	2.88	+2.88
Independent	Emerson Doig	156	2.56	−0.33
Independent	Lynsey Reilly	152	2.49	+2.49
Independent	Bill Barwick	101	1.65	−0.41
Independent	Jo Roberts	73	1.20	+1.20
Total formal votes		6,105	96.08	−0.12
Informal votes		249	3.92	+0.12
Turnout		6,354	82.54	+0.05

== Wagga Wagga ==
Elected councillor	Party
Michael Henderson	Clean Out Council
Richard Foley	Clean Out Council
Dan Hayes	Labor
Amelia Parkins	Labor
Rod Kendall	Independent (Group D)
Dallas Tout	Community First
Jenny McKinnon	Greens
Tim Koschel	Here For You
Georgie Davis	Getting It Done

2021 New South Wales local elections: Wagga Wagga
Party	Candidate	Votes	%	±%
Clean Out Council		9,201	25.6	
Labor		8,279	23.1	+6.1
Independent (Group D)		4,416	12.3	
Community First		3,576	10.0	
Greens		3,347	9.3	+5.0
Here For You		2,808	7.8	
Getting It Done		2,291	6.4	
Independent (Group F)		837	2.3	+2.3
Independent Liberal	Robert Sinclair	572	1.6	
Independent Liberal	Rosina Gordon	287	0.8	
Independent	Richard Salcole	235	0.7	
Independent Liberal	Robin Dennis	20	0.1	
Independent Liberal	Daniel Vieria	16	0.0	
Total formal votes		35,885	93.2	
Informal votes		2,634	6.8	
Turnout		38,519	83.3	
