= Results of the 2024 New South Wales local elections in Riverina =

2024 New South Wales local elections (Riverina)
- 14 September 2024

This is a list of results for the 2024 New South Wales local elections in the Riverina region.

Riverina covers 14 local government areas (LGAs), including the City of Griffith and the City of Wagga Wagga.

== Bland ==
2024 Bland Shire Council election
- 14 September 2024

All 9 seats on Bland Shire Council 5 seats needed for a majority
- Registered: 4,128
- Turnout: 81.73% (▲1.01)
	First party	Second party	Third party
	IND	IND	IND
Party	Independents	Ind. Labor	Ind. National
Last election	8 seats	1 seat	Did not contest
Seats before	8	1	0
Seats won	7	1	1
Seat change	▼1	Steady	▲1
First preference vote	2,804	159	306
Percentage	85.68%	4.90%	9.42%
Swing	▼8.06%	▼1.36%	▲9.42%
Largest party before election
Independents
Subsequent largest party
Independents

=== Bland results ===
2024 New South Wales local elections: Bland
Party	Candidate	Votes	%	±%
Independent	Brian Monaghan (elected)	729	22.4	−6.0
Independent	Holly Brooks (elected)	364	11.2	
Independent	Elizabeth McGlynn (elected)	324	10.0	−2.4
Independent	Emma Henderson (elected)	311	9.6	
Independent National	Lisa Minogue (elected)	306	9.4	
Independent	Rodney Crowe (elected)	264	8.1	−2.5
Independent	Malcolm Carnegie (elected)	189	5.8	
Independent	Mark Hoskinson	176	5.4	
Independent Labor	Tony Lord (elected)	159	4.9	−1.4
Independent	Jill Funnell (elected)	138	4.3	−2.0
Independent	Roger Moore	117	3.6	−4.4
Independent	Glenda Tasker	63	1.9	
Independent	Alan McGlynn	55	1.7	
Independent	Bradley Staniforth	53	1.6	−2.3
Total formal votes		3,248	96.3	
Informal votes		126	3.7	
Turnout		3,374	81.7	

== Carrathool ==
2024 Carrathool Shire Council election
- 14 September 2024

All 10 seats on Carrathool Shire Council 6 seats needed for a majority
- Registered: 1,800
- Turnout: 73.44% (▲33.89%) (Note: In 2021, an election was only held in Ward A, as all candidates for Ward B were elected unopposed.)
	First party
	IND
Party	Independents
Last election	10 seats
Seats before	10
Seats won	10
Seat change	Steady
First preference vote	1,291
Percentage	100%
Swing	Steady
Largest party before election
Independents
Subsequent largest party
Independents

Carrathool Shire Council is composed of two five-member wards. Like in 2021, all councillors were independents without any political party membership.

=== Carrathool results ===
2024 New South Wales local elections: Carrathool
Party	Votes	%	Swing	Seats	Change
Independents	1,291	100%	Steady	10	Steady
Formal votes	1,291	96.49%			
Informal votes	47	3.51%			
Total	1,338				
Registered voters / turnout	1,800	73.44%			

=== A Ward ===
2024 New South Wales local elections: A Ward
Party	Candidate	Votes	%	±%
Independent	Darryl Jardine (elected)	232	35.2	+1.3
Independent	Craig McKeon (elected)	128	19.4	
Independent	Heather Lyall (elected)	100	15.2	−6.0
Independent	David Fensom (elected)	89	13.5	+3.1
Independent	Geoffrey Peters (elected)	65	9.9	−0.6
Independent	Julie Potter	46	7.0	−3.1
Total formal votes		660	97.6	
Informal votes		16	2.4	
Turnout		676	77.1	

=== B Ward ===
2024 New South Wales local elections: B Ward
Party	Candidate	Votes	%	±%
Independent	Michael Armstrong (elected)	137	21.7	
Independent	Beverley Furner (elected)	134	21.2	
Independent	Nicholas Smith (elected)	92	14.6	
Independent	Jamie Parsons (elected)	90	14.3	
Independent	Anne-Maree Young (elected)	59	9.4	
Independent	David Burcham	45	7.1	
Independent	Damon Liddicoat	43	6.8	
Independent	Jeffrey Mickan	31	4.9	
Total formal votes		631	95.3	
Informal votes		31	4.7	
Turnout		662	71.7	

== Coolamon ==
2024 Coolamon Shire Council election
- 14 September 2024

All 9 seats on Coolamon Shire Council 5 seats needed for a majority
- Registered: 3,380
- Turnout: 85.44% (▲2.91)
	First party	Second party
	IND	IND
Party	Independents	Ind. National
Last election	7 seats	1 seat
Seats before	8	1
Seats won	8	1
Seat change	Steady	Steady
Percentage	95.5%	4.5%
Swing	▼0.3	▲0.3
Largest party before election
Independents
Subsequent largest party
TBD

Coolamon Shire Council is composed of nine councillors elected proportionally to a single ward.

Incumbent councillor Jeremy Crocker, who joined the Shooters, Fishers and Farmers Party in 2017 and contested the 2021 election as an endorsed candidate, left the party sometime in the most recent council term and is seeking re-election as an independent.

=== Coolamon results ===
2024 New South Wales local elections: Coolamon
Party	Candidate	Votes	%	±%
Independent	Bruce Hutcheon (elected)	240	8.70	+1.52
Independent National	Wayne Lewis (elected)	125	4.53	+0.26
Independent	Bronwyn Hatty (elected)	524	18.99	−5.78
Independent	Jeremy Crocker (elected)	285	10.33	−5.7
Independent	Colin McKinnon (elected)	203	7.36	−3.74
Independent	David McCann (elected)	457	16.56	+6.23
Independent	Colin Thew	114	4.13	+4.13
Independent	Kathy Maslin (elected)	220	7.97	−2.32
Independent	Alan White (elected)	188	6.81	+0.26
Independent	Matthew Higginson (elected)	313	11.34	+11.34
Independent	Garth Perkin	91	3.30	−0.08
Total formal votes		2,760	95.57	−0.80
Informal votes		128	4.43	+0.80
Turnout		2,888	85.44	+2.91

== Cootamundra–Gundagai ==
2024 Cootamundra–Gundagai Regional Council election
- 14 September 2024

All 9 seats on Cootamundra–Gundagai Regional Council 5 seats needed for a majority
- Registered: 8,634
- Turnout: 83.4%
	First party	Second party	Third party
	IND	IND	IND
Party	Independents	Ind. Labor	Ind. National
Last election	7 seats	1 seat	1 seat
Seats before	7	1	1
Seats won	7	1	1
Seat change	Steady	Steady	Steady
First preference vote	5,234	959	614
Percentage	76.9%	14.1%	9.0
Swing	▼8.6	▲0.2	▲2.6
Largest party before election
Independents
Subsequent largest party
Independents

Cootamundra–Gundagai Regional Council is composed of nine councillors elected proportionally to a single ward.

=== Cootamundra–Gundagai results ===
2024 New South Wales local elections: Cootamundra–Gundagai
Party	Candidate	Votes	%	±%
Independent	Ab McAllister (elected)	1,391	20.4	
Independent	Gil Kelly (elected)	1,329	19.5	
Independent Labor	Danyal Syed (elected)	959	14.1	
Independent National	Logan Collins (elected)	614	9.0	
Independent	Penny Nicholson (elected)	513	7.5	
Independent	Les Cooper (elected)	416	6.1	
Independent	Ethan Ryan (elected)	388	5.7	
Independent	David Graham (elected)	367	5.4	
Independent	Allan Young	307	4.5	
Independent	Rosalind Wight (elected)	296	4.4	
Independent	Steve Maynard	227	2.3	
Total formal votes		6,807	94.5	
Informal votes		393	5.5	
Turnout		7,200	83.4	

== Griffith ==
2024 Griffith City Council election
- 14 September 2024

All 9 seats on Griffith City Council 5 seats needed for a majority
	First party
	IND
Party	Independents
Last election	12 seats
Seats before	12
Largest party before election
Independents
Subsequent largest party
TBD

=== Griffith results ===
2024 New South Wales local elections: Griffith
Party	Candidate	Votes	%	±%
Independent	1. Doug Curran (elected mayor); 2. Shari Blumer (elected 5)	2,588	19.9	−8.7
Independent	1. Anne Napoli (elected 1); 2. Melissa Marin; 3. Tony O'Grady (elected 8)	2,583	19.9	+5.2
Independent	1. Jenny Ellis (elected 4); 2. Damien Thorne	1,679	12.9	+8.6
Independent	1. Satwinder Singh; 2. Graeme Cotton; 3. Mark Dal Bon (elected 6)	1,590	12.2	
Independent	1. Christine Stead (Ind. Lib) (elected 3); 2. Dino Zappacosta	1,531	11.8	+6.5
Independent	1. Laurie Testoni (elected 2); 2. Glen Andreazza	1,243	9.6	
Independent	1. Manjit Lally; 2. Christopher Sutton; 3. Darshna Surana	863	6.6	
Independent	Scott Groat (elected 7)	849	6.5	
Independent	Bill Graeme	64	0.5	
Total formal votes		12,990	88.4	
Informal votes		1,704	11.6	
Turnout		14,694	86.6	

== Hay ==
2024 Hay Shire Council election
- 14 September 2024

All 8 seats on Hay Shire Council 5 seats needed for a majority
	First party
	IND
Party	Independents
Last election	8 seats
Seats before	7
Seats won	8
Percentage	100%
Largest party before election
Independents
Subsequent largest party
Independents

Hay Shire Council is composed of eight councillors elected proportionally to a single ward.

All eight candidates elected in 2021 were independents, although councillor Jenny Dwyer became an Independent National in June 2022. She did not seek re-election in 2024.

=== Hay results ===
2024 New South Wales local elections: Hay
Party	Candidate	Votes	%	±%
Independent	Carol Oataway (elected)	366	22.79	
Independent	Will Miller (elected)	348	21.67	
Independent	Lionel Garner (elected)	200	12.45	
Independent	Martyn Quinn (elected)	197	12.27	
Independent	Darren Tapper (elected)	141	8.78	
Independent	Geoff Chapman (elected)	97	6.04	
Independent	David Townsend	82	5.11	
Independent	Paul Porter (elected)	79	4.92	
Independent	John Perry (elected)	76	4.73	
Independent	Steven Young	20	1.25	
Total formal votes		1,606	100	
Informal votes		55		
Turnout		1,661		

== Junee ==
2024 Junee Shire Council election
- 14 September 2024

All 9 seats on Junee Shire Council 5 seats needed for a majority
- Turnout: 0.00% (▼85.1%)
	First party	Second party	Third party
	IND	IND	SFF
Leader	N/A	N/A	Ingrid Eyding
Party	Independents	Ind. National	SFF
Last election	7 seats	2 seats	Did not contest
Seats before	7	0	0
Seats won	5 seats	2 seats	1 seat
Seat change	▼2	Steady	▲1
First preference vote	Unopposed	Unopposed	Unopposed
Largest party before election
Independents
Subsequent largest party
Independents

Junee Shire Council is composed of nine councillors elected proportionally to a single ward. 13 candidates contested the 2021 election, with Neil Smith receiving the highest individual first preference vote (24.4%).

The 2024 election was uncontested. A by-election will be held to fill the remaining ninth seat, with only eight candidates nominating for the election.

=== Junee results ===
2024 New South Wales local elections: Junee
Party	Candidate	Votes	%	±%
Independent National	Pam Halliburton (elected)	unopposed		
Shooters, Fishers, Farmers	Ingrid Eyding (elected)	unopposed		
Independent	David Carter (elected)	unopposed		
Independent National	Matt Austin (elected)	unopposed		
Independent	Bob Callow (elected)	unopposed		
Independent	Marie Knight (elected)	unopposed		
Independent	Andrew Clinton (elected)	unopposed		
Independent	Robin Asmus (elected)	unopposed		
Registered electors				

== Leeton ==
2024 Leeton Shire Council election
- 14 September 2024

All 9 seats on Leeton Shire Council 5 seats needed for a majority
	First party	Second party	Third party
	IND	IND	IND
Party	Independents	Ind. Labor	Ind. Liberal
Last election	8 seats	1 seat	Did not contest
Seats before	8	1	0
Seats won	7	1	1
Seat change	▼1	Steady	▲1
First preference vote	4482	886	448
Percentage	77.07	15.23	7.70
Swing	-3.01	+6.91	+ 7.70
Largest party before election
Independents
Subsequent largest party
TBD

Leeton Shire Council is composed of nine councillors elected proportionally to a single ward.

=== Leeton results ===
2024 New South Wales local elections: Leeton
Party	Candidate	Votes	%	±%
Independent	Stephen Tynan (elected)	962	16.54	+16.54
Independent	Nicholas Wright (elected)	194	3.34	+3.34
Independent	Bill Robertson	155	2.67	+2.67
Independent	Sandra Nardi (elected)	845	14.53	+5.85
Independent	George Weston (elected)	938	16.13	+5.84
Independent	Sarah Tiffen (elected)	169	2.91	+2.91
Independent	Krystal Maytom (elected)	674	11.59	+2.60
Independent Labor	Michael Kidd (elected)	886	15.23	+6.91
Independent	Tracey Morris (elected)	545	9.37	+4.00
Independent Liberal	Boston Edwards (elected)	448	7.70	+7.70
Total formal votes		5,711		
Informal votes		491	7.92	
Turnout		6,202		

== Lockhart ==
2024 Lockhart Shire Council election
- 14 September 2024

All 9 seats on Lockhart Shire Council 5 seats needed for a majority
	First party
	IND
Party	Independents
Last election	9 seats
Seats before	9
Seats won	9
Seat change	Steady
First preference vote	1,271
Percentage	100
Swing	Steady
Largest party before election
Independents
Largest party after election
Independents

Lockhart Shire Council is composed of three three-member wards, totalling nine councillors.

=== Lockhart results ===
2024 New South Wales local elections: Lockhart
Party	Votes	%	Swing	Seats	Change
Independents	1,271	100	Steady	9	Steady
Formal votes	1,271	94.8			
Informal votes	70	5.2			
Total	1,341	100			
Registered voters / turnout	2,372	(Note: As A Ward did not hold elections, about one third of voters did not vote. Overall turnout among the other two wards was 83.3%)56.5			

=== A Ward ===
2024 New South Wales local elections: A Ward
Party	Candidate	Votes	%	±%
Independent	Frances Day (elected)	unopposed		
Independent	Robert Mathews (elected)	unopposed		
Independent	Erica Jones (elected)	unopposed		
Registered electors				

=== B Ward ===
2024 New South Wales local elections: B Ward
Party	Candidate	Votes	%	±%
Independent	Peter Sharp (elected)	249	41.0	+1.6
Independent	Jane Hunter (elected)	172	28.3	−5.5
Independent	James Walker (elected)	100	16.5	+0.7
Independent	Andrew Jones	87	14.3	
Total formal votes		608	94.3	
Informal votes		37	5.7	
Turnout		645	80.2	

=== C Ward ===
2024 New South Wales local elections: C Ward
Party	Candidate	Votes	%	±%
Independent	Bobby Rushby	315	47.5	
Independent	Gail Driscoll	178	26.9	
Independent	Ian Marston	135	20.4	
Independent	Charles Webb-Wagg	35	5.3	
Total formal votes		663	95.3	
Informal votes		33	4.7	
Turnout		696	86.4	

== Murrumbidgee ==
2024 Murrumbidgee Council election
- 14 September 2024

All 9 seats on Murrumbidgee Council 5 seats needed for a majority
	First party
	IND
Party	Independents
Last election	9 seats
Seats before	9
Largest party before election
Independents
Subsequent largest party
Independents

Murrumbidgee Council is composed of three three-member wards, totalling nine councillors.

=== Murrumbidgee results ===
2024 New South Wales local elections: Murrumbidgee
Party	Votes	%	Swing	Seats	Change
Independents					
Formal votes					
Informal votes					
Total					
Registered voters / turnout					

=== Jerilderie ===
2024 New South Wales local elections: Jerilderie Ward
Party	Candidate	Votes	%	±%
Independent	Faith Bryce (elected)	unopposed		
Independent	Ruth McRae (elected)	unopposed		
Independent	Troy Mauger (elected)	unopposed		
Registered electors				

=== Murrumbidgee ===
2024 New South Wales local elections: Murrumbidgee Ward
Party	Candidate	Votes	%	±%
Independent	Robert Curphey (elected)	197	33.4	+11.5
Independent	Hayley Heath (elected)	173	29.3	
Independent	Judith Saxvik (elected)	137	23.2	+3.5
Independent	Patrick Brown	83	14.1	
Total formal votes		590	94.2	
Informal votes		36	5.8	
Turnout		626	71.9	

=== Murrumbidgee East ===
2024 New South Wales local elections: Murrumbidgee East Ward
Party	Candidate	Votes	%	±%
Independent	Christine Chirgwin (elected)	unopposed		
Independent	Timothy Strachan (elected)	unopposed		
Independent	Robert Black (elected)	unopposed		
Registered electors				

== Narrandera ==
2024 Narrandera Shire Council election
- 14 September 2024

All 9 seats on Narrandera Shire Council 5 seats needed for a majority
	First party
	IND
Party	Independents
Last election	9 seats
Seats before	9
Largest party before election
Independents
Subsequent largest party
TBD

Narrandera Shire Council is composed of nine councillors elected proportionally to a single ward.

=== Narrandera results ===
2024 New South Wales local elections: Narrandera
Party	Candidate	Votes	%	±%
Independent	Neville Kschenka (elected)	497	15.0	+0.3
Independent	Susan Ruffles (elected)	418	12.6	+3.5
Independent	Cameron Rouse (elected)	321	9.7	
Independent	Bob Manning (elected)	316	9.5	+5.7
Independent	Braden Lyons (elected)	288	8.7	−3.6
Independent	Peter Dawson (elected)	261	8.2	−0.1
Independent	Jenny Clarke (elected)	264	8.0	−0.7
Independent	Anthony Marsh	259	7.8	
Independent	Tracey Lewis (elected)	250	7.5	−3.0
Independent	Cameron Lander (elected)	242	7.3	−0.2
Independent	Narelle Payne	136	4.1	−0.1
Independent	Andrew Jamieson	54	1.6	
Total formal votes		3,316	94.7	
Informal votes		187	5.3	
Turnout		3,503	81.3	

== Snowy Valleys ==
2024 Snowy Valleys Council election
- 14 September 2024

All 9 seats on Snowy Valleys Council 5 seats needed for a majority
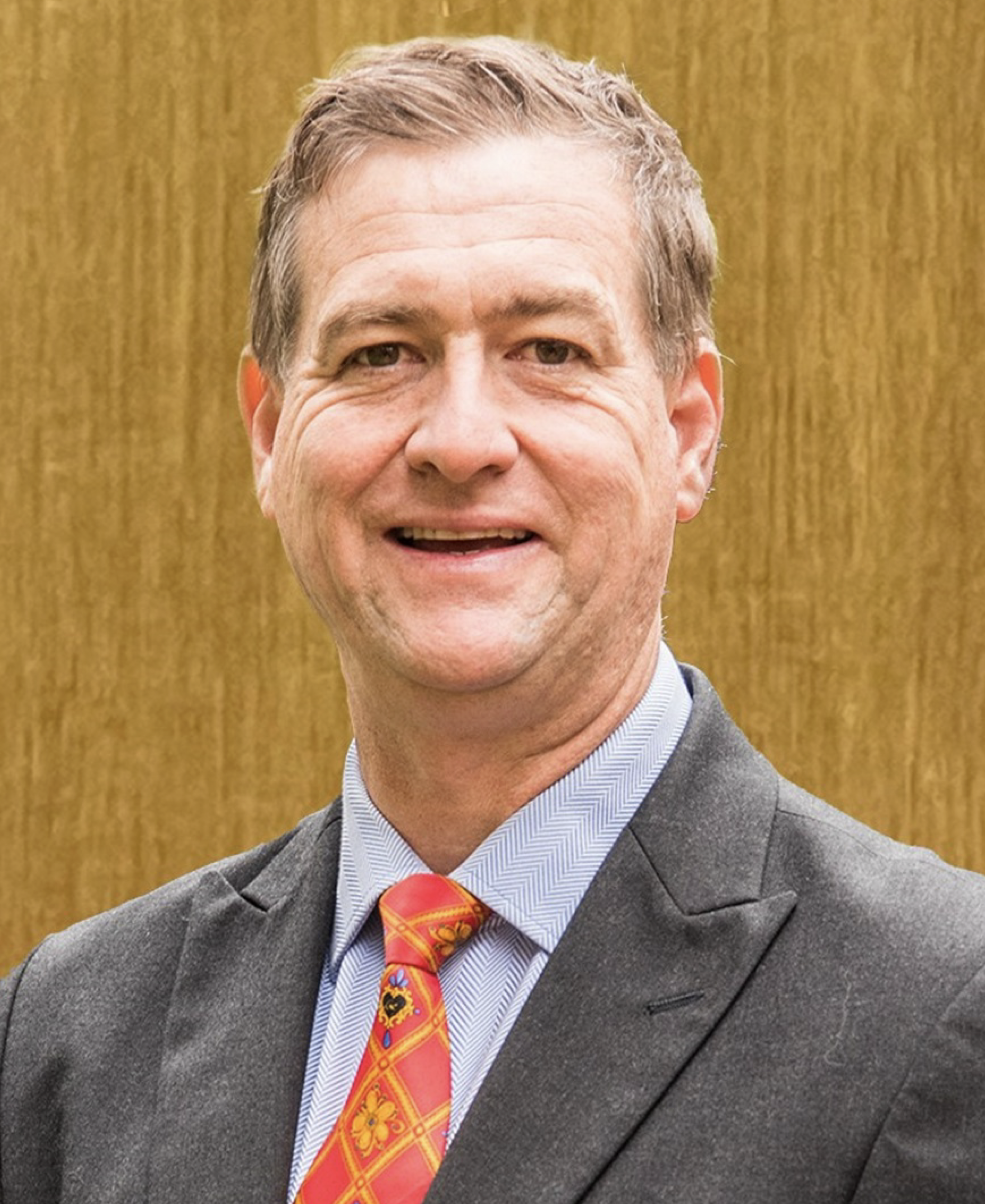
	First party	Second party
	IND
Leader	N/A	John Larter
Party	Independents	Libertarian
Last election	7 seats	Did not contest
Seats before	6	1
	Third party	Fourth party
	IND	IND
Party	Ind. Liberal	Ind. Labor
Last election	1 seat	1 seat
Seats before	1	1
Largest party before election
Independents
Subsequent largest party
TBD

Snowy Valleys Council is composed of nine councillors elected proportionally to a single ward.

12 days after the 2021 election, councillor John Larter joined the Liberal Democratic Party (LDP, later renamed to Libertarian Party). He contested the 2022 Senate election on the party's ticket, and was endorsed by the party for the local elections in July 2024.

=== Snowy Valleys results ===
2024 New South Wales local elections: Snowy Valleys
Party	Candidate	Votes	%	±%
Independent	1. Michael Inglis; 2. Barney Hyams (Ind. Nat); 3. Max Gordon-Hall			
Independent	Hugh Packard			
Independent	Andrew Wortes			
Independent Labor	Michael Ivill			
Libertarian	John Larter			
Independent Liberal	Julia Ham			
Independent	David Sheldon			
Independent	James Hayes			
Independent	Sam Hughes			
Independent	Grant Hardwick			
Independent	Trina Thomson			
Independent	Johanna Armour			
Total formal votes				
Informal votes				
Turnout				

== Temora ==
2024 Temora Shire Council election
- 14 September 2024

All 9 seats on Temora Shire Council 5 seats needed for a majority
	First party	Second party
	IND	IND
Party	Independents	Ind. National
Last election	7 seats	2 seats
Seats before	7	2
Largest party before election
Independents
Subsequent largest party
TBD

Temora Shire Council is composed of nine councillors elected proportionally to a single ward.

=== Temora results ===
2024 New South Wales local elections: Temora
Party	Candidate	Votes	%	±%
Independent National	Rick Firman (elected)	1,736	42.8	−3.7
Independent	Anthony Irvine (elected)	355	8.7	−1.4
Independent	Nigel Judd (elected)	348	8.6	+2.5
Independent National	Graham Sinclair (elected)	327	8.1	+4.1
Independent	Belinda Bushell (elected)	214	5.3	+0.8
Independent	Brenton Hawken (elected)	189	4.7	
Independent	Narelle Djukic (elected)	184	4.5	
Independent	Paul Mahon (elected)	122	3.0	
Independent	Mitchell Farlow	102	2.5	
Independent	Kenneth Smith (elected)	99	2.4	+0.1
Independent	Robert Matthews	97	2.4	
Independent	Sigrid Carr	89	2.2	
Independent	Philip Bleyer	80	2.0	
Independent	Dean McCrae	71	1.8	
Independent	Martin Bushby	47	1.2	
Total formal votes		4,060	97.2	
Informal votes		115	2.8	
Turnout		4,175	89.6	

== Wagga Wagga ==
2024 Wagga Wagga City Council election
- 14 September 2024

All 9 seats on Wagga Wagga City Council 5 seats needed for a majority

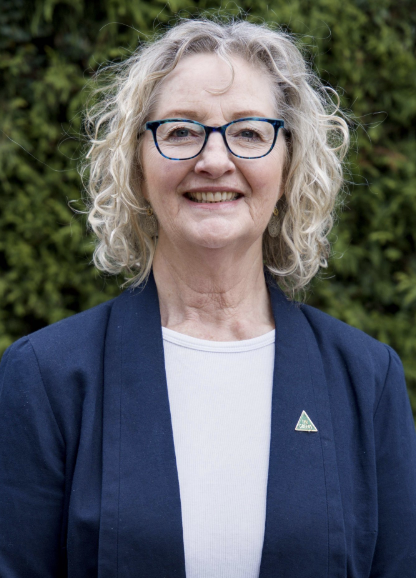
	First party	Second party	Third party
	IND
Leader	N/A	Amelia Parkins	Jenny McKinnon
Party	Independents (Note: Including local groups (not to be confused with locally-registered political parties).)	Labor	Greens
Last election	6 seats	2 seats	1 seat
Seats before	6	1	1
Seats won	7	1	1
Seat change	▲1	Steady	Steady
Primary vote	27,945	4,716	2,279
Percentage	76.5%	12.9%	6.2%
Swing		▼10.1	▼3.1
Largest party before election
Independents
Subsequent largest party
Independents

Wagga Wagga City Council is composed of nine councillors elected proportionally to a single ward.

Three registered parties — Labor, the Greens and the Australian Christians — endorsed candidates. Nine local groups also contested.

In October 2023, Labor councillor Dan Hayes resigned to move to Wollongong. His seat was not filled for the remainder of the term.

=== Wagga Wagga results ===
2024 New South Wales local elections: Wagga Wagga
Party	Candidate	Votes	%	±%
Your Voice Matters To Us	1. Timothy Koschel (elected 1); 2. Allana Condron (elected 5); 3. Mick Henderson; 4. Chris Ingram; 5. Jacinta Evans	8,369	22.9	+14.1
Community First	1. Dallas Tout (elected 2); 2. Karissa Subedi (elected 9); 3. Marie (Pascale) Vythilingum; 4. Megan Norton; 5. Nin Nin Sang Dong	5,952	16.3	+6.3
Labor	1. Amelia Parkins (elected 3); 2. Tim Kurylowicz; 3. Peita Vincent; 4. Steven Dale; 5. Mark Jeffreson	4,716	12.9	−10.1
Getting It Done	1. Georgina Davies (elected 4); 2. Karen Butts; 3. Pradeep Kurien; 4. Sarah Humphries; 5. Steve Taylor	4,412	12.1	+5.7
Foley's Five	1. Richard Foley (elected 6); 2. Christopher Kanck; 3. Shahnaz Akter; 4. Wayne Deaner; 5. Alisha Watkins	2,984	8.2	−15.8
Greens	1. Jenny McKinnon (elected 7); 2. Sam Ryot; 3. George Benedyka; 4. Virginia Gawler; 5. Emma Rush	2,279	6.2	−3.1
Building Tomorrow Together	1. Lindsay Tanner (elected 8); 2. Ali Tanner; 3. Clare Lawlor; 4. Michael Nugent; 5. Andrew Roberts	2,144	5.9	+5.9
Christians	1. Paul McCausland; 2. Christopher Cowell; 3. Paul Cocks; 4. Dorcas Musyimi; 5. Darcy Maybon	1,585	4.3	+4.3
Fix Our Roads	1. Robert Sinclair; 2. Kane Salamon; 3. Rosina Gordon; 4. Julie Sinclair; 5. Cassidy Turner	1,514	4.1	+4.1
Supporting Diversity	1. Rory McKenzie; 2. Samuel Avo; 3. Gail Manderson; 4. Midya Bari; 5. Anna Gannon	939	2.6	−9.7
Ready To Serve	1. Ryan Dedini; 2. Kelly O'Kane; 3. Andrew Tuovi; 4. John Kennedy; 5. Sarah-Jane Jameson	832	2.3	+2.3
Voice of Wagga Residents	1. Saba Nabi; 2. Singh Manjinder; 3. Birenbhai Patel; 4. Priyanka Udeniya; 5. Hina Ashfaq	640	1.7	+1.7
Independent	Rosyln Prangnell	159	0.4	+0.4
Total formal votes		36,525	91.9	
Informal votes		3,233	8.1	
Turnout		39,758		
