= Len Waters Estate =

- Suburb
- Interactive map of Len Waters Estate
- Country: Australia
- State: New South Wales
- City: Sydney
- LGA: City of Liverpool
- Location: 39 km (24 mi) SW of Sydney
- Established: 2009

Government
  - State electorate: Liverpool
  - Federal division: Werriwa

Population
  - Total: 0 (SAL 2016)
- Postcode: 2171
Suburbs around Len Waters Estate
Cecil Park	Elizabeth Hills	Green Valley
Middleton Grange	Len Waters Estate	Hinchinbrook
West Hoxton	Hoxton Park	Prestons

Len Waters Estate is a small industrial estate of Sydney, in the state of New South Wales, Australia. Len Waters Estate is located 39 kilometres south-west of the Sydney central business district, in the local government area of the City of Liverpool.

== Background ==
The estate was named in honour of Len Waters, the first Aboriginal Australian military aviator. Along with Elizabeth Hills, Len Waters Estate used to be part of a greater Cecil Hills until being developed by Mirvac. Len Waters Estate occupies land formerly part of Hoxton Park Airport. This small industrial suburb mostly consists of two distribution centres, a Transit Systems bus depot and a Bunnings hardware store.

== See also ==
- Len Waters
- Hoxton Park Airport
