= Kemps Creek (disambiguation) =

Kemps Creek may refer to:

- Kemps Creek, New South Wales, a suburb of Sydney, Australia
- Kemps Creek (watercourse), a stream in Australia
- Kemp Creek, a stream in the U.S. state of Georgia sometimes called "Kemps Creek"
