= Elizabeth Hills, New South Wales =

Elizabeth Hills
- Suburb
- Interactive map of Elizabeth Hills
- Country: Australia
- State: New South Wales
- City: Sydney
- LGA: Liverpool
- Location: 39 km (24 mi) SW of Sydney CBD
- Established: 2009

Government
  - State electorate: Liverpool
  - Federal division: Werriwa

Population
  - Total: 3,208 (2021 census)
- Postcode: 2171
Suburbs around Elizabeth Hills
Cecil Park	Cecil Hills	Green Valley
Middleton Grange	Elizabeth Hills	Hinchinbrook
Middleton Grange	Len Waters Estate	Hinchinbrook

Elizabeth Hills is a suburb of western Sydney, in the state of New South Wales, Australia. It is located 39 kilometres south-west of the Sydney central business district, in the local government area of Liverpool. Elizabeth Hills was gazetted as a suburb on 18 December 2009. Like the neighbouring suburb of Len Waters Estate, Elizabeth Hills had previously been part of the suburb of Cecil Hills.

== History ==
Formerly farmlands, it is now a predominantly residential estate with housing developments mostly beginning in 2014. The suburb was named after Lady Elizabeth Wylde, the wife of the first landowner in the area who occupied and managed a farm situated at Cecil Hills from 1816 until her death in 1864.

== Demographics ==
In the 2021 Census, there were 3,208 people in Elizabeth Hills. 56.1% of people were born in Australia. The next most common country of birth was Iraq at 16.9%. 34.7% of people spoke only English at home. Other languages spoken at home included Assyrian Neo-Aramaic 13.8%, Chaldean Neo-Aramaic 9.0% (for a total of 22.8% of Sureth speakers), Arabic 8.5%, Vietnamese 4.8% and Serbian 4.3%. The most common responses for religion were Catholic 43.6%, Buddhism 8.1%, No Religion 8.0%, Assyrian Apostolic 8.0% and Christian, nfd 7.3%.

== Transport ==
Transit Systems operates the 827 bus route with services to Liverpool via Bonnyrigg Heights, Green Valley and Heckenberg. It also has connections with the M7 Motorway with the nearby Cowpasture Road exit to the south, and the Elizabeth Drive exit to the north. A pathway in the suburb's west also provides pedestrian and cyclist access to the M7 cycleway.

== Schools ==
Cecil Hills High School, established in 1996, is just outside Elizabeth Hills's boundaries in Cecil Hills which serves as the main secondary school. Cecil Hills Public School is also nearby.
