= The Leader (Liverpool, New South Wales, newspaper) =

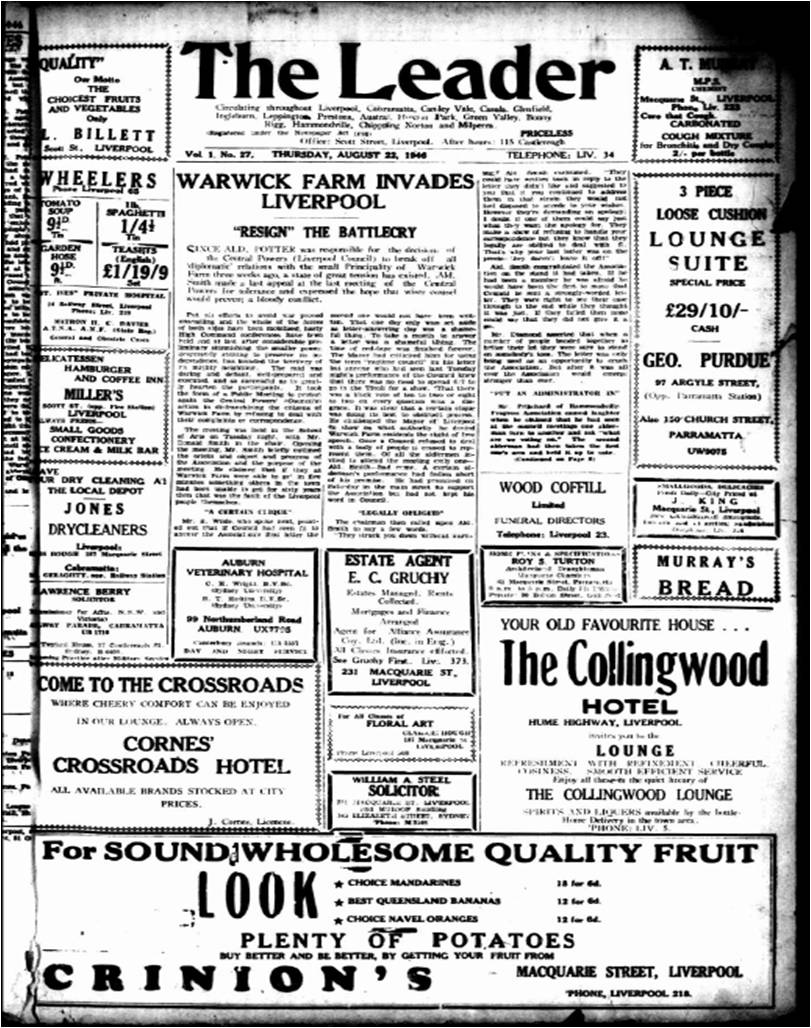
The Leader, 22 August 1946

The Leader was a weekly English language compact format newspaper published by R. Rowell in Liverpool, New South Wales, Australia.

== History ==
First published on 15 August 1946. The Leader was published from 1946–1949. The Leader changed title to the Liverpool Leader ca. 1950 and was published until October 1977. The paper was circulated throughout Liverpool, Cabramatta, Canley Vale, Casula, Glenfield, Ingleburn, Leppington, Prestons, Austral, Hoxton Park, Green Valley, Bonny Rigg, Hammondville, Chipping Norton and Milperra.

== Digitisation ==
The paper has been digitised as part of the Australian Newspapers Digitisation Program project of the National Library of Australia.

== See also ==
- List of newspapers in Australia
