= Leppington =

- Suburb
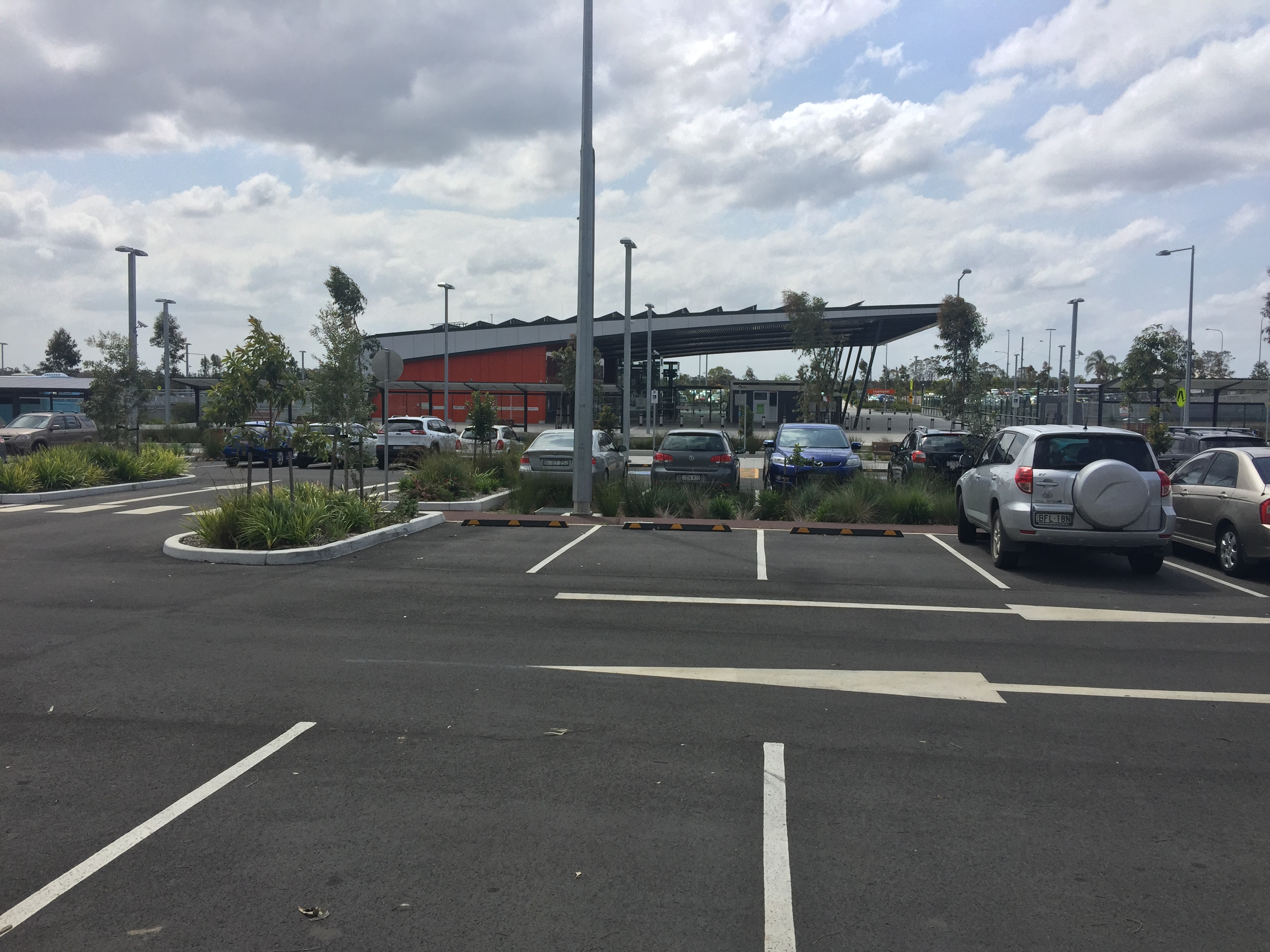
- Leppington station from car park

- Interactive map of Leppington
- Coordinates: 33°57′54″S 150°48′4″E
- Country: Australia
- State: New South Wales
- City: Sydney
- LGAs: City of Liverpool; Camden Council
- Location: 52 km (32 mi) south-west of Sydney CBD
- Established: 1914

Government
  - State electorate: Leppington
  - Federal divisions: Macarthur; Werriwa; Hume
- Elevation: 87 m (285 ft)

Population
  - Total: 9,423 (2021 census)
- Postcode: 2179
Suburbs around Leppington
Austral	Austral; West Hoxton	Horningsea Park
Rossmore	Leppington	Edmondson Park
Catherine Field	Gledswood Hills; Varroville	Denham Court

Leppington is a suburb of Sydney, in the state of New South Wales, Australia. Leppington is located 52 kilometres south-west of the Sydney central business district, in the local government areas of the City of Liverpool and Camden Council.

== History ==
The area now known as Leppington was originally home to the Darug people. It was named after a property called Leppington Park granted to William Cordeaux in 1821. Cordeaux used convict labour to build a two-storey mansion and to work in his fields. The house burnt down in the 1940s but some of the bricks from the house were re-used at Leppington Public School.

The suburb could easily have been named Raby. The first land grant in what is now Leppington was made to Alexander Riley in 1810, who named his property Raby. The property was subdivided in 1914 and a school established in 1923, called Raby Public School. Leppington Post Office opened on 12 February 1924.

In 1933, Land was donated by Mr & Mrs Barrett along Ingleburn road, for the purposes of establishing a Leppington community Hall. In 1956, with the assistance of the local community, a community hall was built, and it is still operating at 123 Ingleburn Rd, Leppington, referred to as the Leppington Hall and operated by the Leppington Progress Association, A privately operated community hall.

In 1971, a catholic church was built by Mr M. J. Williams at the corner of Dickson and Ingleburn Rds. The church was officially opened and blessed by the Most Rev. Thomas McCabe DD on 17 September 1972. The land (9 acres) was donated by Mrs Lilly Tomasavich to the Catholic church, on the one condition, that the land will never be sold.

In 1955 the name of the school was changed to Leppington Public School, possibly inspired by the bricks they inherited from William Cordeaux's mansion. The suburb has been known as Leppington since then. Ironically, Raby Road which connected the property to Campbelltown would later lend itself to the suburb of Raby.

In 2004, Leppington was identified as part of Sydney's South West Growth Centre.

Leppington was the birthplace of convicted Sydney murderer, kidnapper and drug dealer Anthony Perish.

== Population ==
At the 2021 census, the suburb of Leppington recorded a population of 9,423 people. 57.1% of people were born in Australia. The next most common countries of birth were India 4.7%, Iraq 3.0%, Philippines 2.6%, Fiji 2.4% and Nepal 2.3%. 48.1% of people spoke only English at home. Other languages spoken at home included Arabic 5.1%, Urdu 3.4%, Hindi 3.4%, Nepali 2.9% and Assyrian Neo-Aramaic 2.3%. The most common responses for religion were Catholic 30.7%, No Religion 15.4%, Islam 13.7%, Hinduism 8.6% and Anglican 6.1%.

== Transport ==
Camden Valley Way connects Leppington to Camden and Liverpool as well as the Westlink M7, a pay road providing relatively quick connection to Sydney CBD and other parts of greater Sydney. Leppington railway station on the South West Rail Link has frequent direct services to the CBD via Strathfield. Construction began in mid-2010 and opened 8 February 2015. See Leppington railway station for details of local bus services.

== Politics ==
The bulk of Leppington belongs to the north ward of Camden Council while the northwest part of the suburb sits within the City of Liverpool. The suburb is contained within 3 federal electorates those being Werriwa, represented by Anne Stanley (politician) (Labor), Macarthur, represented by Mike Freelander (Labor) and Hume, represented by Angus Taylor (Liberal). Leppington is its own state electorate, it is currently held by Nathan Hagarty from the Australian Labor Party.

== Churches ==
- Hope Anglican Church
- Lifegate Church, Leppington
- St Mary Mother of God Catholic Church - Established 1972
