= Austral, New South Wales =

Austral
- Suburb
- Interactive map of Austral
- Country: Australia
- State: New South Wales
- City: Sydney
- LGA: City of Liverpool
- Location: 42 km (26 mi) south-west of Sydney CBD
- Established: 1891

Government
  - State electorate: Leppington
  - Federal division: Werriwa
- Elevation: 78 m (256 ft)

Population
  - Total: 6,847 (2021 census)
- Postcode: 2179
Suburbs around Austral
Kemps Creek	Cecil Park	Middleton Grange
Rossmore	Austral	West Hoxton
Rossmore	Leppington	Leppington Denham Court

Austral is a suburb of Sydney, in the state of New South Wales, Australia. It is 42 kilometres south-west of the Sydney central business district, in the local government area of the City of Liverpool.

== History ==
The area that now constitutes the suburbs of Austral was a parcel of land in West Hoxton purchased by the Austral Banking and Land Proprietary. When residents pushed for a second public school in the Hoxton Park area in 1891, Austral Banking and Land Proprietary donated 3 acres (12,000 m^{2}) of its land for the site and, in return, the school was named Austral Public School. The name of the school became synonymous with the area although it wasn't officially recognised until 1972. Austral Post Office opened on 7 February 1894.

== Geography ==
It is bounded to the west by waterway Kemps Creek, to the east by a Sydney Water supply channel, to the north by a straight division, and to the south by Bringelly Road. Bonds Creek flows southeast–northwest through the suburb, and converges with Kemps Creek near Fifteenth Avenue. It is of note in its design, its streets laid out in a grid pattern, and all horizontal ones named 'Avenue', in numbers from south to north increasing. It is part of the Rural–urban fringe of Western Sydney that runs from Horsley Park through Badgerys Creek, the adjacent Rossmore, Austral and down to Catherine Field.

== Demographics ==
According to the 2021 census of population, there were 6,847 residents in Austral. 50.3% of people were born in Australia. The next most common country of birth was Iraq at 5.6%. 37.8% of people only spoke English at home. Other languages spoken at home included Hindi, Mandarin, Arabic and Nepali. The most common response for religious affiliation was Catholic at 28.7%.

== Landmarks ==
Austral has a sports ground, youth centre, tennis court and skate ramp at Craik Park, the W V Scott Memorial Park, with a pavilion, and a bowls grounds, Petanque. It has a Rural Fire Service station, primary school (Austral Primary), Retirement Villages (RSL LifeCare Tobruk Village and Scalabrini Village), Nursing Home (John Edmondson VC Gardens) and a small area of commerce, including a post office and telephone. It is the site of Camp Austral girl guides camp, and another small shopping area near the corner of Fifteenth Avenue and Edmonson Avenue. It is also the site of a Hindu temple and an animal shelter.

== Transport ==
Bringelly Road connects Austral to Liverpool and the Westlink M7.

Route 861 connects Carnes Hill to Leppington via Austral. The Route 853/855 bus service connects Bringelly to Liverpool via Rossmore, Austral, Hoxton Park and Cartwright. In 2015, a railway station opened in the neighbouring suburb of Leppington.
