= Horningsea Park, New South Wales =

Horningsea Park
- Suburb
- Interactive map of Horningsea Park
- Country: Australia
- State: New South Wales
- City: Sydney
- LGA: City of Liverpool
- Location: 39 km (24 mi) south-west of Sydney
- Established: 1996

Government
  - State electorate: Leppington
  - Federal division: Werriwa

Population
  - Total: 3,673 (2021 census)
- Postcode: 2171
Suburbs around Horningsea Park
West Hoxton	Hoxton Park	Casula
Middleton Grange	Horningsea Park	Prestons
Leppington	Carnes Hill	Edmondson Park

Horningsea Park is a suburb of Sydney, in the state of New South Wales, Australia. Horningsea Park is located 39 kilometres south-west of the Sydney central business district, in the local government area of the City of Liverpool and is part of the Greater Western Sydney region.

== History ==
In 1819, Joshua John Moore a British grazier was granted 500 acres (2.0 km^{2}) in what was then known as Cabramatta. He named his property "Horningsea" after his birthplace, the village of Horningsea in Cambridgeshire, England. In the 1830s, he built a grand house which still stands to this day in Horningsea Park Drive and is listed on the Register of the National Estate. The house was at some stage home to Count Strzelecki, the Polish-born explorer who named Mount Kosciuszko. It was purchased around 1855 by Vaiben Solomon (1802–1860), and he called Horningsea Park. Vaiben and his family lived there and ran the farm until 1872.

The suburb was part of neighbouring Hoxton Park and largely farmland until 1996 when Long Homes subdivided the area for housing and Liverpool Council named it after Moore's estate.

Horningsea Park has been claimed to be the most haunted area of Liverpool, New South Wales because it has been built over graves. These graves have been moved since the construction on housing in the area.

Horningsea Park has a number of heritage-listed sites, including:

- Camden Valley Way: Horningsea Park

== Population ==
In the 2021 Census, there were 3,673 people in Horningsea Park. 59.2% of people were born in Australia. The next most common countries of birth were Iraq 4.9%, Fiji 3.2%, and Philippines 2.4%. 67.6% of people spoke only English at home. Other languages spoken at home included Arabic 9.2%, Spanish 4.4%, Hindi 3.7%, Serbian 2.4% and Vietnamese 3.6%. The most common responses for religion were Catholic 29.9%, Islam 15.2%, No Religion 13.9%, Eastern Orthodox 7.0% and Christian nfd 5.7%.

== Commercial area ==
Carnes Hill Marketplace is a large shopping centre at the northern edge of the suburb.

== Schools ==
There are two schools in Horningsea Park. The Holy Spirit Primary School is a Catholic school behind the Carnes Hill Marketplace. John Edmondson High School is a state high school on Horningsea Park Drive.

== Transport ==
Cowpasture Road and Camden Valley Way are the main roads in and out of Horningsea Park, the latter providing connection to Liverpool and Camden. Horningsea Park is the terminus for four Transit Systems bus services to Liverpool, two via Cowpastures Road and Hoxton Park, and two via Camden Valley Way, Prestons and Lurnea. In 2015, railway stations opened in the neighbouring suburbs of Edmondson Park and Leppington.

== Notable residents ==
- Joshua John Moore (1790–1864), grazier whose house Horningsea Park gave the suburb its name.
- Paweł Edmund Strzelecki (1797–1873), explorer who named Mount Kosciuszko.
- Vaiben Solomon (1800–1860), arrived NSW 1817, ex convict and early Australian pioneer, businessman and philanthropist, involved in the building of the first Sydney synagogue.
