= Carnes Hill =

- Suburb
- Interactive map of Carnes Hill
- Country: Australia
- State: New South Wales
- City: Sydney
- LGA: City of Liverpool
- Location: 39 km (24 mi) WSW of Sydney CBD
- Established: 1998

Government
  - State electorate: Leppington
  - Federal division: Werriwa
- Elevation: 51 m (167 ft)

Population
  - Total: 3,332 (2021 census)
- Postcode: 2171
Suburbs around Carnes Hill
West Hoxton	Hoxton Park	Hoxton Park
West Hoxton	Carnes Hill	Prestons
West Hoxton	Horningsea Park	Horningsea Park

Carnes Hill is a suburb of Sydney, in the state of New South Wales, Australia. Carnes Hill is located 38 kilometres southwest of the Sydney central business district, in the local government area of the City of Liverpool and is part of the Greater Western Sydney region.

The suburb and surrounding areas are rapidly expanding and are expected to reach a population of 100,000 in the future. In 2016 projects began for a recreational precinct which now include a library, cafes, a fitness centre, tennis courts, indoor basketball courts, skate park, a large shopping mall with specialty stores and restaurants and a community centre on the corner of Cowpasture and Kurrajong Road. Carnes Hill has two AFL fields and is home to the South West Tigers. The local primary school is Greenway Park Public School.

== Population ==
In the 2021 Census, there were 3,332 people in Carnes Hill. 51.8% of people were born in Australia. The next most common countries of birth were Iraq 10.3% and Fiji 4.9%. 37.3% of people spoke only English at home. Other languages spoken at home included Arabic 8.6% and Hindi 6.1%. The most common responses for religion were Catholic 37.3%, Islam 12.7%, No Religion 8.6% and Hinduism 7.7%.
