= Lurnea =

- Suburb
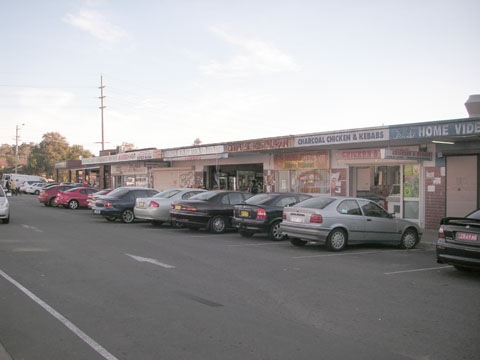
- Lurnea Plaza

- Interactive map of Lurnea
- Country: Australia
- State: New South Wales
- City: Sydney
- LGA: City of Liverpool
- Location: 35 km (22 mi) west of Sydney
- Established: 1920

Government
  - State electorate: Holsworthy
  - Federal division: Werriwa

Population
  - Total: 10,057 (2021 census)
- Time zone: AEST
- Postcode: 2170
Suburbs around Lurnea
Cartwright	Liverpool	Liverpool
Prestons	Lurnea	Liverpool
Prestons	Casula	Casula

Lurnea is a suburb of Sydney, in the state of New South Wales, Australia. It is 35 kilometres south-west of the Sydney central business district, in the local government area of the City of Liverpool.

== History ==
Lurnea was originally home to the Cabrogal people who spoke the Darug language. Following British settlement of the area in the 1800s, it was given the colloquial name Hillview as the suburb had nice views of the surrounding Liverpool area, and this name persisted until after World War I when the land was converted into a soldier settlement which provided the soldiers with enough room for a house and a small farm. It was renamed Lurnea which means "a resting place". Lurnea Post Office opened on 15 February 1921. A street was also named after the old name of the suburb – Hillview Parade. In the 1970s the area was redeveloped again into a residential suburb for a small number of veterans from the Vietnam War. It also became home to several Vietnamese refugee families of the aforementioned war.

== Transport ==
Hoxton Park Road runs along the northern edge of Lurnea providing access to Liverpool as well as suburbs to the west of Lurnea such as Hoxton Park. It also has relatively easy access to the M5 South Western Motorway to the city and the Westlink M7 to the northwest of Sydney. Lurnea is well serviced by Transit Systems bus routes with five services passing through the suburb and another three along Hoxton Park Road on the northern edge.

== Education ==
There are three schools situated in the suburb:

- Lurnea High School is a co-educational secondary school. It is a public high school that caters for around 650 students from year 7 through to year 12. An Intensive English Centre and Hearing Impaired Unit are also established at Lurnea High. The school was first opened in 1965.
- Lurnea Public School is a primary public school. It caters for about 475 students from kindergarten through to year 6. The school was first opened in 1960
- St Francis Xavier Primary School is a co-educational primary catholic school.

== Population ==
Lurnea's population at the 2021 Australian census was 10,057, with 49.4% of people being born in Australia. The most common countries of birth were Iraq 10.2%, Lebanon 6.3%, Vietnam 3.4%, Fiji 2.1% and New Zealand 1.3%. 32.2% of people only spoke English at home. Other languages spoken at home included Arabic 32.1%, Vietnamese 4.7%, Serbian 1.8%, Hindi 1.7% and Spanish 1.6%. The most common responses for religion in Lurnea were Islam 28.9%, Catholic 18.4%, No Religion 10.3%, Not stated 9.4% and Miscellaneous Religions 8.6%. In Lurnea, Christianity was the largest religious group reported overall (40.3%) (this figure excludes not stated responses). The median household income of $1,239 per week is lower than the national average ($1,746) while the rent and mortgage repayments are slightly higher than average.
