= Westlink M7 =

Motorway in Sydney, New South Wales, Australia

Westlink M7 New South Wales

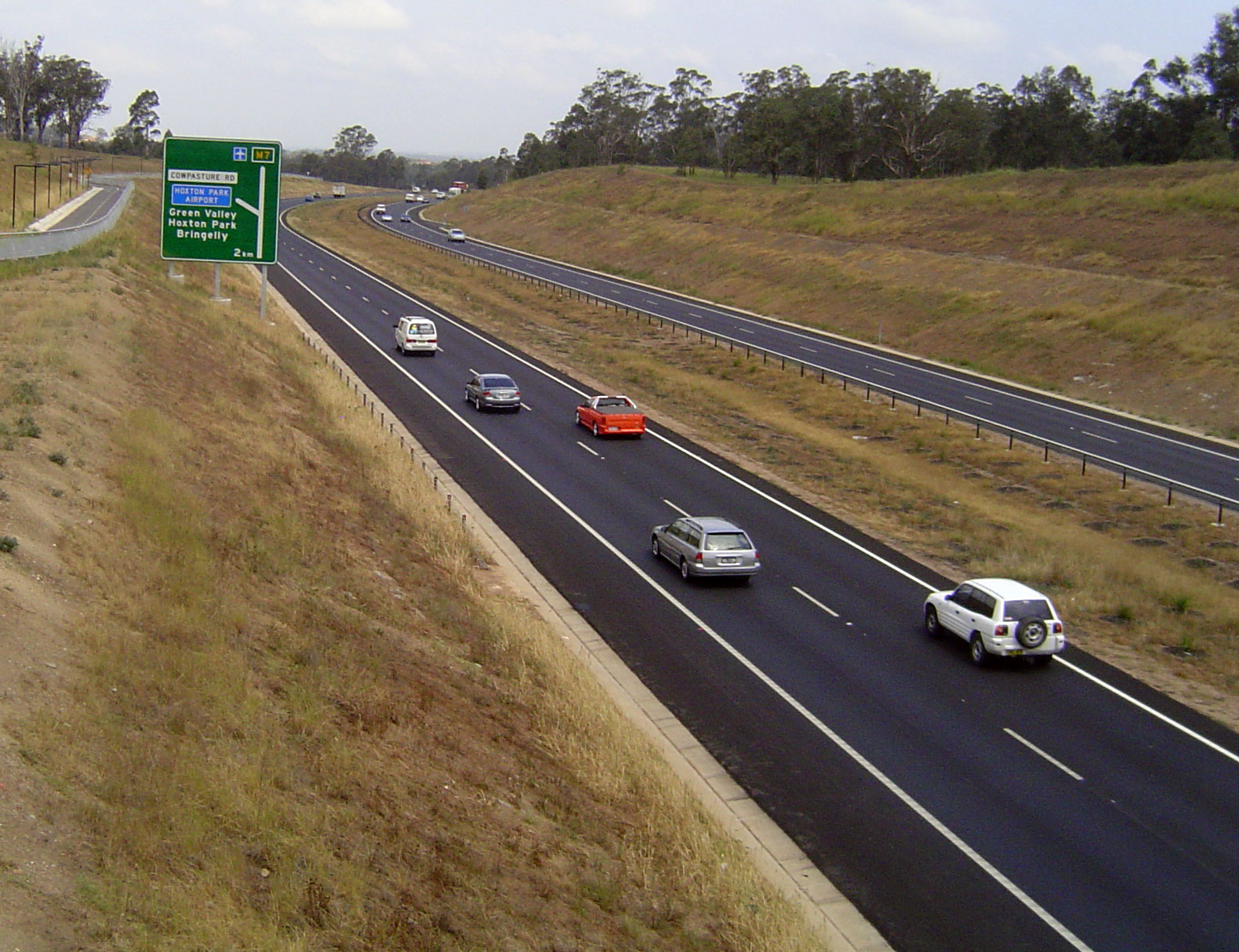
- Westlink M7 heading southbound, Elizabeth Hills
- Coordinates: 33.766476°S 150.964220°E (North end); 33.954535°S 150.877311°E (South end)

General information
- Type: Motorway
- Length: 39.8 km (25 mi)
- Opened: 16 December 2005
- Gazetted: 17 January 2003
- Route number(s): M7 (2005–present)

Major junctions
- North end: M2 Hills Motorway; Seven Hills, Sydney
- Great Western Highway; M4 Motorway; M12 Motorway
- South end: South Western Motorway; Hume Motorway; Prestons, Sydney

Location(s)
- Major suburbs: West Pennant Hills, Baulkham Hills, Quakers Hill, Blacktown, Eastern Creek, Prestons

Highway system
- Highways in Australia; National Highway • Freeways in Australia; Highways in New South Wales

The Westlink M7 is a 40-kilometre (25 mi) tolled urban motorway in Sydney, New South Wales that is part of the Sydney Orbital Network. Owned by the NorthWestern Roads (NWR) Group, it connects three motorways: the M5 South-West Motorway at Prestons, the M4 Western Motorway at Eastern Creek, and the M2 Hills Motorway at Baulkham Hills.

== Route ==
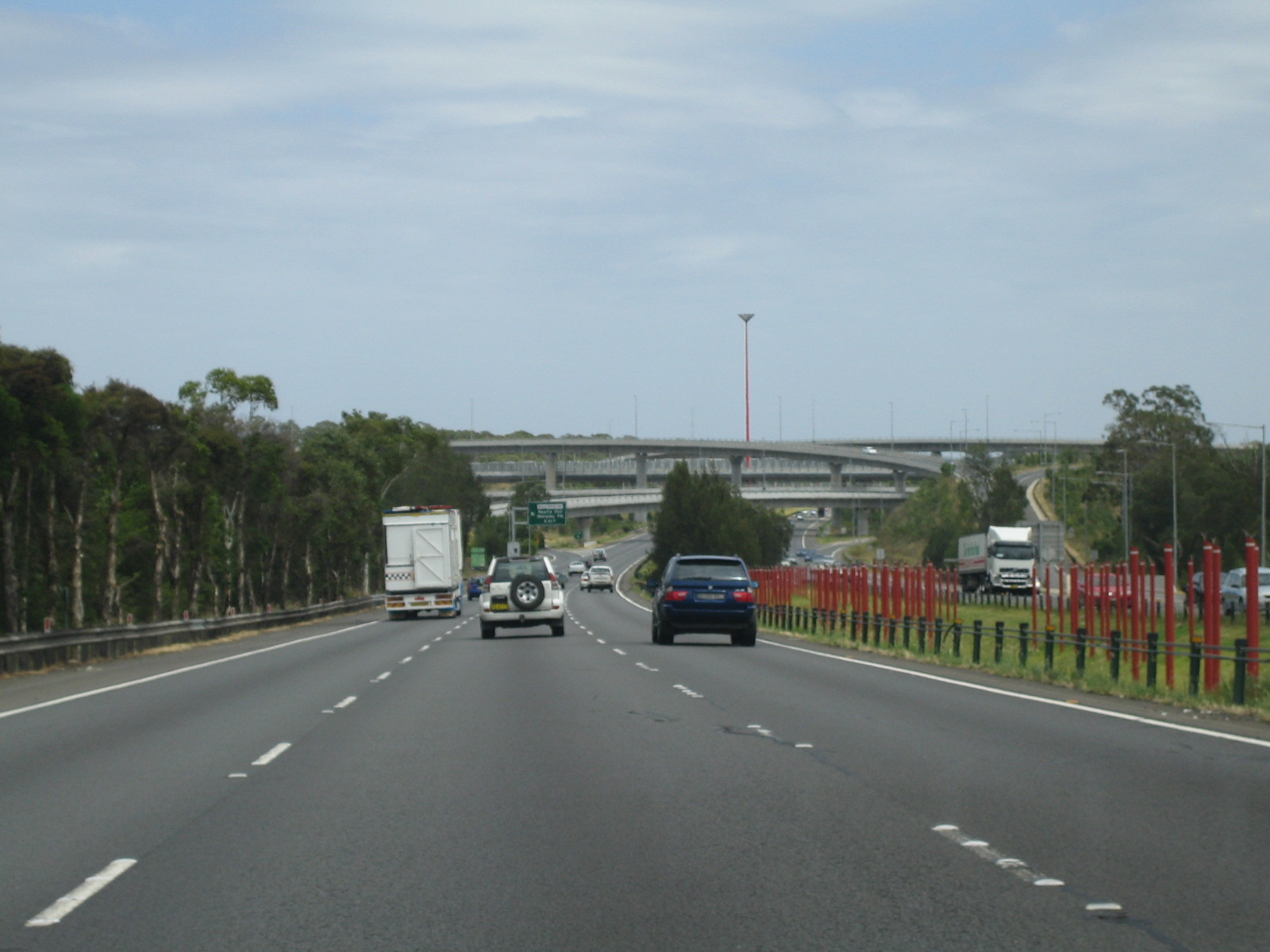
Light Horse Interchange

Westlink M7 begins at the Roden Cutler Interchange, a Y-junction with the M31 Hume Motorway and M5 South-West Motorway at Prestons, and weaves to the west of Liverpool to the junction of Elizabeth Drive and Wallgrove Road in Abbotsbury. From then on it runs parallel to Wallgrove Road north towards the Great Western Highway and the Light Horse interchange, a stack junction with the M4. Continuing north, it leads to Minchinbury and follows alongside Rooty Hill Road up to Dean Park at an exit with Rooty Hill Road North and Richmond Road.

From this junction, Westlink M7 turns eastward along the preserved Castlereagh Freeway corridor through Quakers Hill and Kings Langley up to the interchange with Old Windsor Road to Norwest Business Park and continues southeast to reconcile with the existing M2 Hills Motorway in Baulkham Hills. It is 4 lanes (2 lanes each way) from its terminus in Baulkham Hills to Richmond Road, then 6 lanes (3 lanes each way) from Richmond Road to the Roden Cutler Interchange.

The M7 cycleway runs parallel to Westlink M7.

=== Light Horse Interchange ===
The Light Horse Interchange is the junction of the M4 and M7 motorways. The stack interchange is the largest of its type in the Southern Hemisphere. It was named in honour of an Australian World War One formation, the Australian Light Horse.

== History ==
Western Sydney is the fastest growing part of the Sydney metropolitan area. Pennant Hills and Woodville Roads (signed as Ring Road 5, then as State Route 55), then later Cumberland Highway (State Route 77), were originally built as bypasses for Sydney, had instead become primary arteries through the western suburbs.

In the late 1980s, with the intended construction of a BHP steel mill in Rooty Hill, Blacktown City Council required BHP to construct an arterial route that allowed industrial traffic to bypass the Rooty Hill CBD and the newly opened Davis Overpass. A 2 kilometres (1.2 mi) two-lane road named Phillip Parkway was constructed between Woodstock Avenue and Eastern Road and opened to traffic in July 1992. The alignment of Phillip Parkway would eventually be the preferred alignment of the Western Sydney Orbital two years later in 1994.

By the late 1990s and early 2000s, Western Sydney had become the third-biggest producer of Australia's GDP, after the Sydney CBD and Melbourne. The growth of industrial and residential areas brought about a massive increase in traffic on its local roads. This led to the planning of the Western Sydney Orbital, which, among its original purposes, was to serve the at the time stillborn Western Sydney Airport at Badgerys Creek.

In January 2001 the federal government made a commitment to progressively contribute A$356 million to the Western Sydney Orbital project, with the remaining A$1.5 billion required for the design and construction provided by the private sector. Planning approval was given by the NSW Minister for Planning in February 2002. The project was renamed Westlink M7 in July 2003.

The motorway was privately funded through an innovative construction contract method known as a "deed" to facilitate the expedition of the tendering phase; several deeds were drawn up based on the contractors proposals. The deed was for the full design, construction, operation and maintenance of the motorway including more than 40 kilometres (25 mi) of continuously reinforced concrete (CRCP) and asphalt roads, upgrading of local roads, the longest free-flowing (no toll booths) toll road in the world at the time. More than 90 bridges (of four different types) and the largest shared path network in the Southern Hemisphere. The design, construct, operate and maintain contract worth at least A$2.0 billion was awarded to WSO (Western Sydney Orbital Pty Ltd) by the Roads & Traffic Authority. The design and construct portion of the contract valued at A$1.8 billion was awarded to a joint venture between Abigroup and Leighton Contractors (ALJV) with design work undertaken by a further joint venture by Maunsell AECOM and SMEC (Snowy Mountains Engineering Corporation) with further subcontracting to other designers (Arup) and independent verification by Sinclair Knight Merz.

The passing of the Roads Act of 1993 updated road classifications and the way they could be declared within New South Wales. Under this act, the Roads & Traffic Authority declared the Western Sydney Orbital as Tollway 6009, from its interchange with M2 Hills Motorway in Seven Hills to the interchange with the M5 South-West Motorway in Prestons, on 7 January 2003, nearly two years before it had officially opened. Now known as Westlink M7, the tollway still retains this declaration.

The motorway was opened to traffic on 16 December 2005, eight months ahead of schedule. WSO (commonly known as Westlink) operate the motorway with maintenance subcontracted to Westlink Services and tolling to ROAM. With its opening, Metroad 7 between Liverpool and Beecroft was transferred from Cumberland Highway to Westlink M7. Westlink M7 was the first Sydney motorway to be marked with an alphanumeric shield (M7) rather than the hexagonal Metroad shield.

On 25 December 2005, just 9 days after opening, the motorway suffered its first fatality: a 12-year-old boy died at Cecil Park when the four-wheel drive he was travelling in rolled down an embankment and onto Elizabeth Drive, almost crushing another car.

In 2020, WSO – then already a business of the NorthWestern Roads Group – submitted an unsolicited proposal to the NSW government to widen the M7 and construct the M7 and M12 Motorway interchange simultaneously. This was aimed to reduce the disruption to M7 traffic and provide project delivery efficiencies for the M7–M12 interchange. In August 2020, the proposal has moved to Stage 2 of the process with further progression to Stage 3 in May 2022. In December 2022, the proposal was approved, and John Holland Group was announced as the preferred contractor to design and construct the project. Construction began in August to October the following year.

== Tolls ==
=== Ownership ===
When first incorporated, WSO Co. Pty Limited (commonly known as Westlink) was a consortium owned by Transurban (40%), Macquarie Investment Group (MIG) (40%), Leighton (10%) and Abigroup (10%). The consortium was awarded the bid to develop Westlink M7 in October 2002, and entered into a 34-year concession period on 14 February 2003. Leighton and Abigroup were the contractors for the construction of M7.

When the M7 opened in December 2005, Transurban and MIG purchased an additional 5% equity interest in Westlink M7 from Leighton and Abigroup. Subsequently, in 2006–2007, Abigroup sold its stake to Transurban and MIG, with the latter two having a 47.5% shareholding each and Leighton having a 5% shareholding.

In August 2008, Transurban and MIG exercised their pre-emptive rights and acquired Leighton's 5% stake equally, increasing their shareholding to 50% each. In December 2008, MIG announced it would sell its 50% stake of Westlink to Western Sydney Road Group (WSRG), of which MIG owned 50% and Queensland Investment Corporation (QIC) owning the other 50%. Transurban had the pre-emptive right to acquire MIG's share, but declined in January 2009 due to its high price. The sale to WSRG proceeded, and QIC and MIG each had 25% ownership of Westlink.

MIG was later restructured into Intoll and then acquired by the CPP Investment Board in December 2010. Since then, the Westlink M7 is owned by Transurban (50%), QIC (25%) and CPP (25%). In 2015, Westlink was reorganised under a new umbrella entity, NorthWestern Roads Group (NWR), with no changes in ownership. The NWR Group would also deliver and now tolls and operates the NorthConnex, opened in October 2020.

The 34-year concession to construct, operate and toll the M7 was originally due to expire on 14 February 2037. The concession was later extended - as part of the NorthConnex agreement between NWR and the state government - to expire in June 2048. It was extended again - as part of a deal with Transurban to widen 23km of the tollway from two to three lanes in both directions between Prestons and Oakhurst, as well as building the M12 Motorway interchange - another three years, and will now expire in June 2051.

=== Pricing ===
The Westlink was built as a fully tolled, gateless motorway employing electronic payment, with an initial toll-free period that ended on 15 January 2006. The toll for a car or motorcycle was originally 29.91 cents per kilometre, capped after 20 kilometres (12 mi) at $5.98. On 1 April 2006, this increased to 30.07 cents per kilometre, capped after 20 kilometres (12 mi) at $6.01.

Tolls are adjusted quarterly according to the CPI and heavy vehicle tolls are three times the toll for a car and motorcycle.

Toll prices as of 1 July 2025
Toll road	Class A toll prices (Note: Class A vehicles are typically cars and motorcycles; Class B vehicles are all other vehicles including trucks and heavy vehicles)			Class B toll prices	Toll increase	Toll concessionaire	Expiry of toll concession
Toll road	Flagfall	Charge per km	Toll cap	Class B toll prices	Toll increase	Toll concessionaire	Expiry of toll concession
Westlink M7	–	$0.5047	$10.09	3 x of Class A prices	Quarterly on 1 January, 1 April, 1 July, and 1 October, by quarterly CPI	NorthWestern Roads (NWR) Group (50% Transurban, 25% QIC, 25% CPP)	June 2051

== Exits and interchanges ==
LGA	Location	km	mi	Destinations	Notes
The Hills Shire	Winston Hills–Baulkham Hills boundary	0.0	0.0	Hills Motorway (M2) – Sydney, Hornsby, Gosford, Newcastle, Brisbane	North-eastern terminus of Westlink M7 and route M7; continues east as Hills Motorway
The Hills Shire	Bella Vista	1.9	1.2	Old Windsor Road (A2) – Seven Hills, Windsor	Westbound exit and eastbound entrance
Blacktown	Glenwood	3.5	2.2	Norwest Boulevard, to Old Windsor Road – Bella Vista, Castle Hill	Eastbound exit and westbound entrance
Blacktown	Glenwood–Kings Langley–Kings Park–Acacia Gardens quadripoint	5.6	3.5	Sunnyholt Road – Blacktown, Glenwood	
Blacktown	Quakers Hill	9.7	6.0	Quakers Hill Parkway – Doonside, Quakers Hill	Westbound exit and eastbound entrance
Blacktown	Colebee–Dean Park–Glendenning–Oakhurst quadripoint	12.2	7.6	Richmond Road – Richmond, Blacktown, Rooty Hill	Northbound exit via Rooty Hill Road North
Blacktown	Glendenning–Plumpton boundary	14.3	8.9	Power Street – Plumpton, Woodcroft	Southbound exit and northbound entrance
Blacktown	Glendenning–Plumpton–Rooty Hill tripoint	15.2	9.4	Woodstock Avenue – Rooty Hill, Glendenning	Northbound exit and southbound exit
Blacktown	Eastern Creek	18.9	11.7	Great Western Highway (A44) – Parramatta, Penrith	Southbound exit and northbound entrance
Blacktown	Eastern Creek	19.9	12.4	Western Motorway (M4) – Sydney, Lithgow	Light Horse Interchange
Blacktown	Eastern Creek	21.5	13.4	Wallgrove Road – Horsley Park, Rooty Hill	
Fairfield	Horsley Park	24.9	15.5	The Horsley Drive – Horsley Park, Fairfield	
Fairfield–Liverpool boundary	Abbotsbury–Cecil Park–Cecil Hills tripoint	29.0	18.0	Elizabeth Drive – Liverpool, Luddenham	
Fairfield–Liverpool boundary	Abbotsbury–Cecil Park–Cecil Hills tripoint	29.0	18.0	M12 Motorway (M12) – Badgerys Creek, Western Sydney Airport	
Liverpool	Middleton Grange–Len Waters Estate–Hoxton Park tripoint	34.3	21.3	Cowpasture Road – Cecil Hills, Horningsea Park	
Liverpool	Prestons	36.6	22.7	Bernera Road – Prestons, Hinchinbrook	
Liverpool	Prestons–Casula boundary	39.8	24.7	South Western Motorway (M5 north-east) – Bankstown, Sydney, Sydney Airport; Hume Motorway (M31 south) – Campbelltown, Goulburn, Canberra, Melbourne; Camden Valley Way (A28 east, unallocated west) – Casula, Bringelly, Narellan, Camden	Southern terminus of Westlink M7 and route M7
1.000 mi = 1.609 km; 1.000 km = 0.621 mi: Incomplete access; Route transition

== See also ==
- Freeways in Australia
- Freeways in Sydney
- M7 cycleway
