= Len Waters =

Australian fighter pilot

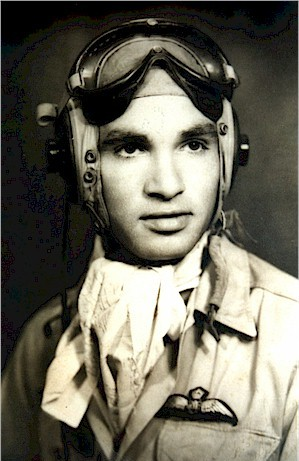
- Len Waters, c. 1944–45
- Born: 20 June 1924; Boomi, New South Wales
- Died: 24 August 1993 (aged 69); Cunnamulla, Queensland
- Military career
- Allegiance: Australia
- Branch: Royal Australian Air Force
- Service years: 1942–1946
- Rank: Warrant Officer
- Unit: No. 78 Squadron
- Conflicts: World War II; South West Pacific theatre
- Other work: Shearer

Leonard Victor "Len" Waters (20 June 1924 – 24 August 1993) was the first Aboriginal Australian military aviator, and the only one to serve as a fighter pilot in the Royal Australian Air Force (RAAF) during World War II. Aboriginal people at the time suffered significant discrimination and disadvantages in Australian society, such as restrictions on movement, residence, employment, and access to services and citizenship. Born in northern New South Wales and raised in Queensland, Waters was working as a shearer when he joined the RAAF in 1942. Training initially as a mechanic, he volunteered for flying duties and graduated as a sergeant pilot in 1944. He flew P-40 Kittyhawks in the South West Pacific theatre, where he completed ninety-five missions, mainly close air support. By the end of the war he had risen to the rank of warrant officer. Following his discharge from the RAAF in 1946, he attempted to start a regional airline but was unable to secure financial backing and government approval. He went back to shearing, and died in 1993 aged sixty-nine.

== Early life ==
Leonard Victor (Len) Waters was born at Euraba Mission, near Boomi in northern New South Wales, on 20 June 1924. He was the fourth child of eleven born to labourer Donald Waters and his wife Grace Vera (née Bennett). They belonged to the Kamilaroi group of Aboriginal Australians, whose traditional lands encompassed southern Queensland and northern New South Wales. Grace's father George Bennett was a veteran of World War I who had served with the 29th Battalion AIF on the Western Front. Donald's father was white, and Donald's skin was so light that he was not classed as Aboriginal. When Waters was two the family was moved twenty kilometres (twelve miles) from Euroba to the Toomelah Aboriginal Reserve. In 1931 Donald was offered work at Nindigully, near St George, Queensland, and took the opportunity to relocate his family. At a reserve such as Toomelah, the children of large families were at greater risk of being removed by the government; a town like Nindigully not only put the Waters family beyond the jurisdiction of reserve authorities but also offered the chance of better education.

Waters completed seventh grade at Nindigully State School, two grades higher than he would have been permitted at Toomelah. He excelled at mathematics and geography, boxed, played cricket and rugby, and learnt to shoot with his father's .22 rifle. Hearing tales of pioneering aviators Charles Kingsford Smith, Amy Johnson, Bert Hinkler and Charles Lindbergh, and reading stories of Biggles, Flash Gordon, and Buck Rogers, he had, as he put it, his "head in the clouds" from an early age. He also displayed a mechanical aptitude, helping his father maintain the family's Model T Ford. Waters' teacher had hoped he would continue his education in Brisbane but he left school, aged fourteen, to support his family, working alongside his father as a ring barker beginning in April 1938. He was paid ten shillings per week, for seven day's work, less than one-sixth of the average wage at the time. In 1939, he began working as a shearer.

== RAAF career ==
Although the military had officially barred or restricted the recruitment of Aboriginal people in earlier periods, these impediments were significantly relaxed after Japan entered World War II, and Australia came under direct attack for the first time. Having turned eighteen, Waters enlisted in the Royal Australian Air Force (RAAF) on 24 August 1942, at Brisbane. The application form required the candidate to state if they were of "pure European descent", which Waters answered in the affirmative. He began training as an aircraft mechanic, but later volunteered for flying service. The aircrew interviewer thought he looked "a bit rough" but "should make a fighter". His flying training began at No. 1 Initial Training School at Somers, Victoria, in December 1943. Waters believed his lack of education would be a disadvantage, and studied nights to make up for it. Keen to be a pilot, he was concerned that he would be allocated to duty as a wireless operator because he showed an aptitude for Morse transmission early on. He was also asked to imagine himself as the tail gunner in a Lancaster or Halifax heavy bomber, to which he replied, "I had a very disappointed look on my face, sir!" So convinced was he that he would not achieve his dream of becoming an aviator, Waters made three separate bets against himself being selected, and had to pay out £15 when he was nonetheless chosen.

I was terribly keen to prove myself in the elite ... The flying part of the Air Force was the elite. I might add that there were 375 [students] on that course and 48 of us finished up as pilots...and the end result when we got our wings...there were only three blokes ahead of me on average.

— Len Waters

Waters undertook his basic flight instruction at No. 8 Elementary Flying Training School in Narrandera, New South Wales, where he flew de Havilland Tiger Moths. Completing his training on CAC Wirraways at No. 5 Service Flying Training School in Uranquinty, he received his wings as a sergeant pilot on 1 July 1944. He was then posted to No. 2 Operational Training Unit at Mildura, Victoria, where he converted to P-40 Kittyhawk fighters. Once, while he was on leave, Waters was briefly gaoled in Moree, New South Wales, for not carrying an identity card, which was one of the racially discriminatory institutions affecting Aboriginal people at the time. On 14 November 1944, he was posted to No. 78 Squadron, a fighter unit based on the island of Noemfoor, off Dutch New Guinea. When he arrived, he was allocated a P-40 Kittyhawk. By chance, a previous pilot had nicknamed the plane "Black Magic" and painted those words on its nose. Waters found the name of his plane an amusing coincidence and chose to retain it.

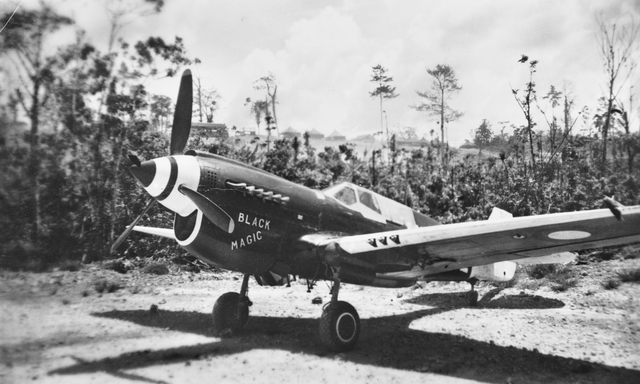
Waters' P-40 Kittyhawk, "Black Magic"

By this stage of the war, Japanese aircraft were almost non-existent in the South West Pacific theatre; No. 78 Squadron's main role was ground attack, bombing and strafing enemy positions. Waters flew ninety-five sorties from Noemfoor, and later from the air bases at Morotai and Tarakan, in Borneo. During one mission, his aircraft was struck by a 37 mm cannon shell that embedded itself behind him in the cockpit without detonating. He flew for another two hours, with the possibility of the shell exploding at any time, a situation he likened to having a loaded gun against his head. "I'll tell you what", he said after returning to base, "that was the best landing I ever made". On 1 January 1945, he was promoted to flight sergeant. By the end of the war, Waters was commanding operations whose personnel included commissioned officers. A colleague described him as a "gaunt, genial figure, humble despite his daring feats". As well as flying, Waters held the RAAF middleweight boxing title. He returned to Australia on 27 August.

One of Len Waters' brothers, Donald Edward (Jimmy) Waters, had served as an infantryman with the Australian Army during the war. With the end of the Pacific War in September 1945, Len considered volunteering for the Australian component of the British Commonwealth Occupation Force in Japan, if his brother did also. Jim declined at the time (he later changed his mind), so Len left the Air Force with the rank of warrant officer on 18 January 1946.

== Post-war life and legacy ==
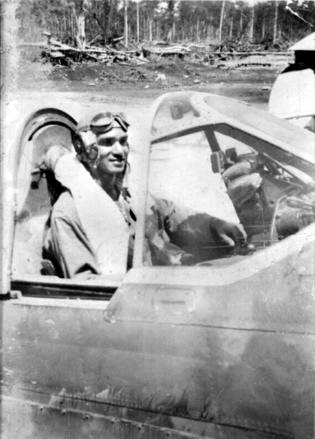
Waters in his Kittyhawk, 1945

After his discharge, Waters attempted to start a regional airline serving South West Queensland, but he was not able to secure finance or bureaucratic agreement. He reportedly wrote four letters seeking government approval, but never received a reply. He never flew a plane again. Although racism in the military during World War II was considered to be minimal, Waters and other Aboriginal people who had served their country found that the skills they had acquired were not valued in peacetime. He wrote later that, having put off his uniform, he simply "returned to being a blackfellow".

Waters married Gladys May Saunders, a waitress, on 16 February 1946 at St Andrew's Presbyterian Church in St George; they had six children. He worked as an automotive mechanic, but was forced to cease by union rules, which required him to serve an apprenticeship. Waters was then briefly employed by a local council in Queensland as a road worker, before returning to shearing, which took him away from his family to properties stretching from North Queensland to Victoria. He personally estimated that he sheared a million sheep during his life.

Waters applied for housing commission accommodation and was allocated a house at Inala, Brisbane, in August 1956. He eventually bought the property and lived there for thirty-three years. He had to cut back on work following a car accident in 1972 that left him suffering epilepsy. Aged sixty-nine, he died on 24 August 1993 after a fall in Cunnamulla, and was buried in St George Cemetery.

In 1995–96, Waters was commemorated in several ways: Australia Post depicted his portrait on a stamp and that of his P-40 Kittyhawk fighter "Black Magic" on an aérogramme, as part of its Australia Remembers series; a brand of port was named after his personal Kittyhawk; Len Waters Place, a park in Inala, was opened; Moree Plains Shire Council dedicated Leonard Waters Park in Boggabilla, New South Wales; and Len Waters Street in Ngunnawal, Australian Capital Territory, was named after him. In 2003, Balonne Shire Council erected a monument to Waters and another local RAAF identity, Squadron Leader John Jackson, in St George. The suburb of Len Waters Estate was established in the City of Liverpool, New South Wales, in 2009. In 2011, the Sutherland Shire Council recognised Waters' achievements by dedicating Len Waters Park, with a memorial plinth and plaque, at Timbrey Circuit, Barden Ridge, New South Wales. In October 2020, a new building at RAAF Base Williamtown was named in his honour. In 2018 Peter Rees published The Missing Man, a biography of Waters.
