= Cecil Hills Farm =

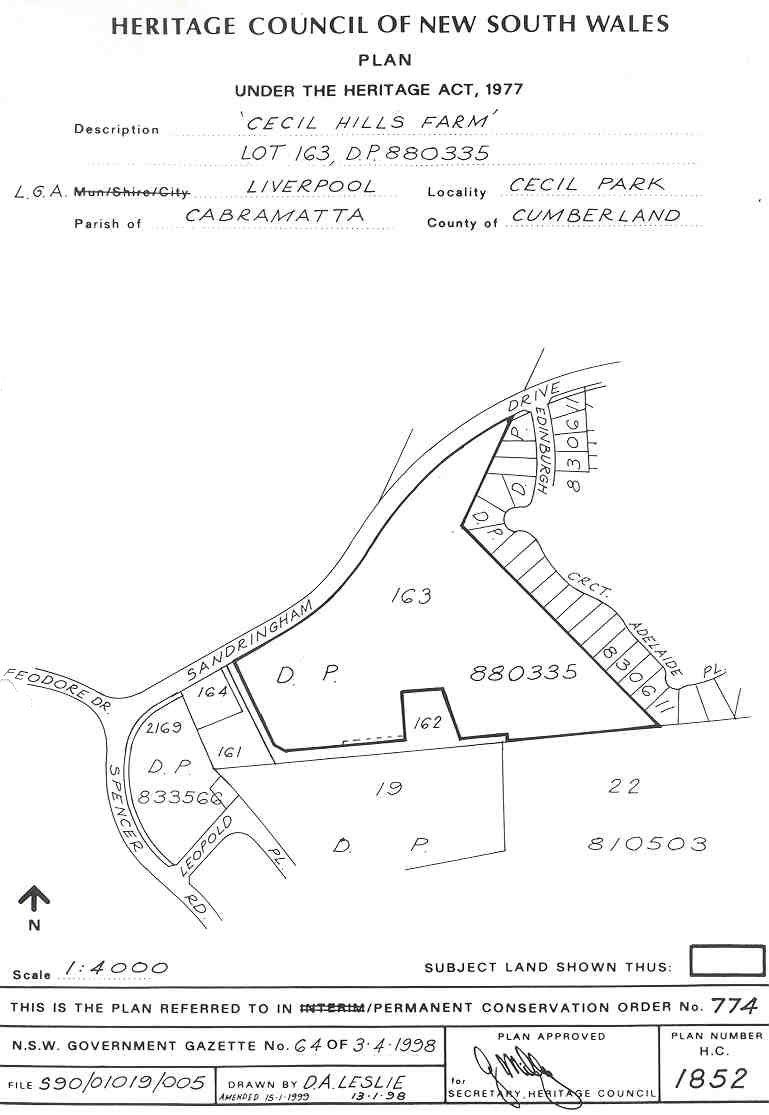
- Heritage boundaries

- Location within Sydney Location within Australia
- 33.8865°S 150.8527°E
- Location: Sandringham Drive, Cecil Hills, City of Liverpool, Sydney New South Wales, Australia

History
- Built: 1818–1824

Site notes
- Owner: Department of Planning and Infrastructure

New South Wales Heritage Register
- Official name: Cecil Hills Farm
- Type: state heritage (complex / group)
- Designated: 2 April 1999
- Reference no.: 774
- Type: Homestead Complex
- Category: Farming and Grazing

Cecil Hills Farm is a heritage-listed residence at Sandringham Drive, Cecil Hills, New South Wales, a suburb of Sydney, Australia. It was built from 1818 to 1824. The property is owned by the Government of New South Wales. It was added to the New South Wales State Heritage Register on 2 April 1999.

== History ==
The first land grants in the area were made between 1807 and the early 1820s when the area was opened up under Governor Macquarie in his push for new land heading west and south west from Sydney.

The land comprising the property which became known as Cecil Hills was the result of the amalgamation of grants to Joseph Sherrard, Simeon Lord, Thomas Wylde and John Wylde. The grant of John Wylde fronted the Cowpasture Road that linked Prospect to Camden (today's Camden Valley Way) and is approximately 8 km west of Liverpool. John Wylde had arrived in the colony with his father Thomas Wylde (and other family members) in 1816.

The family settled in Sydney with Wylde taking up his position as Judge Advocate to the Colony, a position to which he had been appointed while in England. John Truro Wylde was born in 1781 the eldest son of Thomas Wylde. He was ambitious and actively sought a posting to the colonies. Wylde was offered a post in New South Wales which he initially declined on grounds of financial hardship. After offers of financial assistance and relocation costs from the Government of New South Wales he accepted the posting and moved with his brother-in-law to the colony. John received his grant in 1817 and named his property Cecil Hills after his home Cecil Lodge, at Cheshunt, Hertfordshire.

John Wylde, who was living at O'Connell Street in the city, took up his grant and by July 1818 had contracted to supply 6,000 lbs of meat to the Government stores. This made him the largest recorded supplier of meat at the time. By 1820 Commissioner Bigge noted that Simeon Lord with 4,165 acres and John Wylde with 1,479 were the largest land holders in Sydney. The Wylde family did not live on the property until, at the earliest, July 1824 when he gave notice of leaving his official residence and advertised the disposal of all the household effects from that residence.

It is most likely that the homestead at Cecil Hills was constructed prior to Wylde's moving in. The property had been producing substantial quantities of beef from as early as 1818 indicating that it was well established and had a substantial number of staff to operate the farm activities. By 1828 John had left the Colony and the property was occupied by his wife Elizabeth. There is no indication of how staff were accommodated and there are no remains of structures on the site dating from that period apart from the house.

Convicted London joiner and carpenter James Gough (1790-1876) who arrived on the Earl Spencer in 1813 got the private commission to build John Wylde's Cecil Hills farmhouse.

Thomas Wylde sold his city residence in July 1820 and may have moved to Cecil Hills. He died in December 1821 and his property passed to John. In 1831 Sherard sold his adjoining 100 acres to John and Edward Wylde, bringing the property to a total of 3,589 acres.

Wylde retained his properties in NSW until his death in 1859 when they passed to his wife who remained in residence until her death in 1864. They were leased that year and again in 1874. Between 1870 and 1890 various powers of attorney were granted over the property until finally in 1890 the Perpetual Trustee Company took over trusteeship and disposed of it in 1892.

The property was divided into several parcels, many of which have now been resumed for roads and electricity lines. A parcel of 1,878 acres containing the main homestead, changed hands several times and was finally sold to Charles Ward Pye who transferred the property to his sons Henry and Richard. There were further road resumptions in 1943 and 1953 and then in 1965 for a main electricity line across the property.

On 23 October 1963 the registered owner of the property became Cecil Hills Pty Ltd. In 1972 the Government compulsorily purchased the property from the Pye family and it has remained in government ownership since that time. The Pye family had operated the property as a beef and sheep farm run by a manager on the site, but did not at any stage live on the holding.

The buildings underwent extensive conservation works in the early 1990s. At the time of its heritage listing in 1999, it was operating as a day program for post-school intellectually disabled people run by The Junction Works Inc.; however, this no longer operates at the site.

The former farmland associated with the house is being developed by Mirvac as the 1000-home Elizabeth Hills estate.

== Description ==
The Cecil Hills Farm Group comprises a complex of rural farm buildings of various dates from the early nineteenth to the early twentieth century. The complex includes a main homestead and a wide range of outbuildings (most of which have been modified) and other ancillary works/structures. All of the buildings are set in a relatively unspoilt, largely rural landscape.

The Cecil Hills Farm Group includes:

1. Main Homestead: a single storey brick nog construction building with hipped iron roof (c. 1820s);
2. Rear garage: (possibly the former kitchen block);
3. Stables;
4. Former cow bails;
5. Shearing shed;
6. Other works/structures associated with farming activities (stockyards, sheep dip, gallows);
7. Former sites of buildings and structures;
8. Other outbuildings including a small iron privy and a pair of corrugated iron sheds.

Mature plantings around the house include coral trees (Erythrina sp., probably E.x sykesii), Moreton Bay fig (Ficus macrophylla) and kurrajong (Brachychiton populneus). Other plantings include cherry laurel (Prunus laurocerasus), likely a former hedge species on site.

The complex also contains a recent corrugated iron and steel shed (c. 1960s) which is not significant and a fibro outhouse.

There may still be some archaeological potential associated with the site's former use, but it is presumed that potential will be limited due to the extensive conservation.

The Cecil Hills Groups is substantially intact and has retained a high degree of integrity, particularly the main homestead.

== Heritage listing ==
The Cecil Hills Farm Group is one of the earliest surviving farm complexes in the Liverpool district and has operated as a working farm for over 170 years. The main farmhouse is a rare and unusual example of brick nog construction, retaining much of its earlier detailing. The farm group, although not all dating from the earliest period, is a good example of a large early farm complex with elements spanning the period from 1820 to the present. The farm buildings give context to the house and surrounds allowing a high level of understanding and interpretation of the use of the property. The property was granted to, occupied and farmed by Sir John Wylde, Judge Advocate to Governors Brisbane and Macquarie. He was a significant figure in colonial history, associated with the founding of the Bank of New South Wales and the Australian judicial system.

Cecil Hills Farm was listed on the New South Wales State Heritage Register on 2 April 1999 having satisfied the following criteria.

The place is important in demonstrating the course, or pattern, of cultural or natural history in New South Wales.

Cecil Hills Farm has historical significance as one of the earliest farms in the Liverpool district. The site has further significance for its association with John Wylde, the Judge Advocate to Colony as one of the first (and largest) suppliers of beef to the colony.

The place is important in demonstrating aesthetic characteristics and/or a high degree of creative or technical achievement in New South Wales.

Cecil Hills Farm has aesthetic significance as a rare surviving early farm group retaining elements of its original rural setting. The farm buildings give context to the house and surrounds that allow a high level of understanding and interpretation of the use of the property, allowing rare insights into an early working farm.

The place has a strong or special association with a particular community or cultural group in New South Wales for social, cultural or spiritual reasons.

Cecil Hills Farm has social significance as the former property and then residence of John Wylde and his family. It has further significance for its contribution to the survival of the colony of NSW through beef and mutton production.

The place has potential to yield information that will contribute to an understanding of the cultural or natural history of New South Wales.

Cecil Hills Farm has technical/research significance on a number of levels. Firstly for its demonstration of early colonial building techniques, particularly the now extinct technique of brick nogging. Secondly for its demonstration of colonial farming practices. Thirdly for its demonstration of the evolution of farming practices in NSW from the earliest days of the colony through to the mid twentieth century. Cecil Hills Farms provides a rare insight into the evolution of a working farm over a long period of time.

The place possesses uncommon, rare or endangered aspects of the cultural or natural history of New South Wales.

Cecil Hills Farm is an extremely rare grouping of substantially intact farm buildings dating from the 1820s through to the early 20th century.

The place is important in demonstrating the principal characteristics of a class of cultural or natural places/environments in New South Wales.

Cecil Hills Farm is a rare representative example of a substantially intact Colonial farm group associated with the early days of feeding the Colony.
