= Nathan Hagarty =

Australian politician

Nathan Hagarty MP
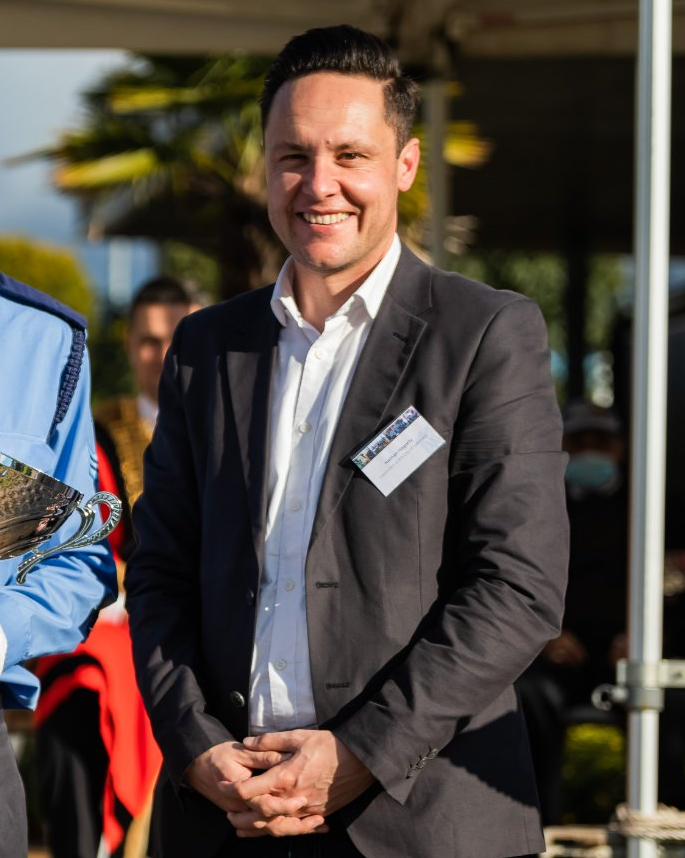

Government Whip in the New South Wales Legislative Assembly
- Incumbent
- Assumed office 17 October 2023
- Deputy: Janelle Saffin (2023—2025); Liesl Tesch (2025—present)
- Preceded by: Steve Whan

Member of the New South Wales Legislative Assembly for Leppington
- Incumbent
- Assumed office 25 March 2023
- Preceded by: electorate established

Councillor of the City of Liverpool for North Ward
- In office 2016 – 15 December 2023

Personal details
- Party: Labor Party
- Education: Western Sydney University

Nathan Matthew Hagarty is an Australian politician who has served as Government Whip in the New South Wales Legislative Assembly since 2023. He was elected a member of the Legislative Assembly representing Leppington for the Labor Party in 2023.

== Career ==
Hagarty has a Bachelor of International Studies from Western Sydney University and holds numerous accreditations in project management and information and communications technology. He has worked across the financial services, education and public sectors in operations, product management and information technology roles. Hagarty was formerly the Treasurer of Local Government NSW, chair at Western Sydney Migrant Resource Centre, and a Director at Settlement Services International. He is served as a Director of Active Super from 2021 until 2024.

=== Politics ===
Hagarty was elected to Liverpool City Council for the North Ward in 2016. He was named as Labor's mayoral candidate for Liverpool at the 2021 local election. He was unsuccessful but maintained his seat on Council. In 2021, he served as Chief of Staff for Member for Werriwa, Anne Stanley.

Hagarty was endorsed as the Labor candidate for the new seat of Leppington at the 2023 New South Wales state election and was elected to represent the seat.

In October 2023, Hagarty signed an open letter which condemned attacks against Israeli and Palestinian civilians during the Gaza war.
