= Mount Vernon, New South Wales =

Mount Vernon
- Suburb
- Interactive map of Mount Vernon
- Coordinates: 33°51′25″S 150°48′36″E
- Country: Australia
- State: New South Wales
- City: Sydney
- LGA: City of Penrith
- Location: 42 km (26 mi) west of Sydney CBD

Government
  - State electorate: Badgerys Creek
  - Federal division: McMahon
- Elevation: 104 m (341 ft)

Population
  - Total: 1,235 (2021 census)
- Postcode: 2178
Suburbs around Mount Vernon
| Kemps Creek | Kemps Creek | Horsley Park |
| Kemps Creek | Mount Vernon | Horsley Park |
| Kemps Creek | Cecil Park | Cecil Park |

Mount Vernon is a suburb of Sydney, in the state of New South Wales, Australia. Mount Vernon is 42 kilometres west of the Sydney central business district, in the local government area of the City of Penrith and is part of the Greater Western Sydney region.

Mount Vernon is a sparsely populated rural suburb providing a close community atmosphere for its residents. It is a hilly suburb with views all the way to the Blue Mountains. Kemps Creek forms its northern and western boundary with Mamre Road providing a boundary on its west along with Kemps Creek.

== History ==
Mount Vernon takes its name from the land granted in 1820 to Anthony Fenn Kemp (1773–1868). It was presumably named after Mount Vernon, George Washington's home in Virginia in the United States of America. Some roads around Mount Vernon were named after U.S. Presidents:

- Garfield Road – James A. Garfield
- Lincoln Road – Abraham Lincoln
- Truman Road – Harry S. Truman
