= Lurnea High School =

Location
- Lurnea, South Western Sydney, New South Wales; Australia; 33°56′32″S 150°53′45″E

Information
- Type: Government-funded co-educational comprehensive secondary day school
- Motto: Truth through reason
- Established: 1965; 61 years ago
- School district: Liverpool
- Educational authority: New South Wales Department of Education
- Principal: Kylie Landrigan
- Teaching staff: 76.1 FTE (2018)
- Years: 7–12
- Enrolment: 648 (2018)
- Campus type: Suburban
- Website: lurnea-h.schools.nsw.gov.au

Lurnea High School (abbreviated as LHS) is a government-funded co-educational comprehensive secondary day school located in Lurnea, a south-western suburb of Sydney, New South Wales, Australia.

== History ==
Established in 1965, the school caters for approximately 650 students in 2018, from Year 7 to Year 12, of whom four percent identified as Indigenous Australians and eighty percent were from a language background other than English. The school is operated by the New South Wales Department of Education; and the current principal is Kylie Landrigan.

In 2024, a physical education teacher at the school, Tayla Brailey, was arrested and charged with committing sexual intercourse and sexual touching of a person between 17 and 18 years old under special care. Brailey was charged again with sexually abusing another student under special care two weeks after she was released on bail. Brailey is also charged with using a carriage service to access child abuse material. Brailey pleaded guilty to four of the charges in March 2026, and currently awaits sentencing. Three other charges were dropped.

== See also ==
- List of government schools in New South Wales: G–P
- Education in Australia
