= Horsley Park =

- Suburb
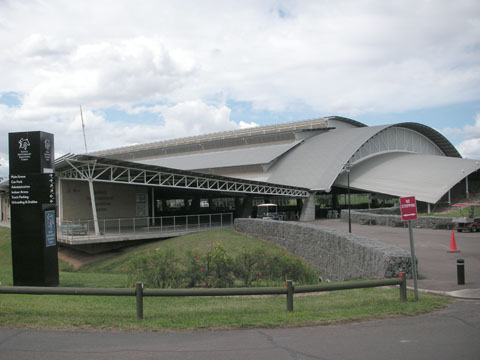
- Sydney International Equestrian Centre

- Interactive map of Horsley Park
- Country: Australia
- State: New South Wales
- City: Sydney
- LGA: City of Fairfield
- Location: 39 km (24 mi) west of Sydney CBD

Government
  - State electorate: Badgerys Creek
  - Federal division: McMahon
- Elevation: 78 m (256 ft)

Population
  - Total: 1,790 (2021 census)
- Postcode: 2175
Suburbs around Horsley Park
Kemps Creek	Eastern Creek	Prospect
Mount Vernon	Horsley Park	Wetherill Park
Mount Vernon	Cecil Park	Abbotsbury

Horsley Park is a suburb of Sydney in the state of New South Wales, Australia. Horsley Park is located 39 kilometres west of the Sydney central business district in the local government area of the City of Fairfield. Horsley Park is part of the Greater Western Sydney region. It is a semi-rural suburb, located 5 km west of Wetherill Park and 11 km north-west of Fairfield.

== History ==
Aboriginal people from the Cabrogal tribe, a sub-group of the Gandangara tribe, have lived in the Fairfield area. European settlement began in Fairfield in the early 19th century. Horsley Park was originally part of Colonel George Johnston's 2,000-acre (8.1 km^{2}) property "Kings Gift", which was given to him by Governor King for his part in putting down the Irish Rebellion at Vinegar Hill in 1804.

After his death it passed to his daughter Blanche who in 1829 married Major George Nicholas Weston. He built an Indian colonial style homestead on the property and named it "Horsley" after his birthplace in Surrey, England. Horsley Homestead is one of the few remaining early colonial buildings in the Fairfield district today protected by The Australian Heritage National Trust.

In 1959, The Horsley Drive (so named because it leads to Horsley Park) opened up as a continuous route from Lansvale. Horsley Park Public School was opened in 1931.

During the Sydney 2000 Olympics, Horsley Park became the venue for events of equestrian.

Today, Horsley Park is known to have a rich Italian and Maltese heritage residing. It is also known for being the original location for the formation of Club Marconi.

== Heritage listings ==
Horsley Park has a number of heritage-listed sites, including:

- 52–58 Jamieson Close: Horsley complex

== Population ==
At the 2021 census, there were 1,790 residents in Horsley Park. 65.0% of people were born in Australia with the next top countries of birth being Italy 7.7%, Malta 5.1% and Iraq 3.0%. 54.6% of people spoke only English at home. Other languages spoken at home included Italian 10.4%, Maltese 6.9% and Arabic 4.4%. Catholicism was the top religious affiliation, with 59.7% of people stating they were Catholic.

== Geography ==
There are a number of small farms in the area. A small group of shops is located on the main street, The Horsley Drive, including Horsley Park Gun Shop, Horsley Park Tavern & other small businesses. There is also the piety store located in the our lady of victories parish Church, where many religious artefacts can be purchased, such as statues and the annual chocolate pascal lamb, introduced by the Michaelite order of priests who took over the declining Paulist missionaries.

Burley Road has the highest recorded street-tree canopy cover in Horsley Park, at 48,605 m^{2}.

== Schools ==
Horsley Park contains three schools:

- Marion Catholic Primary School (conjoined with the local Catholic Church)
- Horsley Park Public School (which has been servicing the area since the 1930s)
- St Narsai Assyrian Christian College (which relocated to the area in January 2018)

Churches located in Horsley Park include:

- Our Lady of Victories Catholic Church, known for its Good Friday Procession
- Spanish Community Bible Church
- Horsley Park Christian Church (also known as Chung Chen Chinese Christian Church), founded by Chinese refugees from East Timor, and located in Horsley Park since 12 November 2000
- Bethel Mar Thoma Church Sydney, consecrated on 9 March 2024, is an Indian Christian denomination which follows Lesser Eastern/Syrian traditions.

== Transport ==
The Westlink M7 motorway runs through Horsley Park. Bus route 813 operate between Horsley Park shops on the Horsley Drive and the Fairfield interchange

== Climate ==
Horsley Park has a humid subtropical climate (Cfa) with warm to hot summers and cool to mild winters. The highest recorded temperature was 47.0 °C, registered on 4 January 2020. -2.3 °C was the lowest temperature recorded on 17 July 2007.

Climate data for Horsley Park (Sydney International Equestrian Centre)
Month	Jan	Feb	Mar	Apr	May	Jun	Jul	Aug	Sep	Oct	Nov	Dec	Year
Record high °C (°F)	47.0 (116.6)	46.4 (115.5)	40.5 (104.9)	35.9 (96.6)	28.1 (82.6)	24.7 (76.5)	27.3 (81.1)	29.3 (84.7)	36.0 (96.8)	38.3 (100.9)	42.0 (107.6)	44.4 (111.9)	47.0 (116.6)
Mean daily maximum °C (°F)	29.9 (85.8)	28.7 (83.7)	26.8 (80.2)	23.9 (75.0)	20.5 (68.9)	17.6 (63.7)	17.4 (63.3)	19.1 (66.4)	22.5 (72.5)	24.8 (76.6)	26.5 (79.7)	28.5 (83.3)	23.8 (74.8)
Mean daily minimum °C (°F)	17.9 (64.2)	17.8 (64.0)	16.2 (61.2)	12.9 (55.2)	9.2 (48.6)	7.0 (44.6)	5.9 (42.6)	6.6 (43.9)	9.3 (48.7)	11.9 (53.4)	14.4 (57.9)	16.2 (61.2)	12.1 (53.8)
Record low °C (°F)	10.4 (50.7)	10.4 (50.7)	7.2 (45.0)	1.9 (35.4)	0.8 (33.4)	−1.8 (28.8)	−2.3 (27.9)	−0.5 (31.1)	0.7 (33.3)	3.6 (38.5)	5.6 (42.1)	8.9 (48.0)	−2.3 (27.9)
Average precipitation mm (inches)	79.3 (3.12)	121.6 (4.79)	89.6 (3.53)	68.2 (2.69)	43.6 (1.72)	65.9 (2.59)	51.9 (2.04)	42.0 (1.65)	38.3 (1.51)	59.9 (2.36)	75.5 (2.97)	65.6 (2.58)	802.6 (31.60)
Average precipitation days (≥ 1 mm)	8.1	7.6	8.8	6.7	5.1	5.9	5.6	4.4	4.9	5.9	7.1	7.1	77.2
Average relative humidity (%)	49	53	54	53	52	55	50	42	42	45	50	48	49

== See also ==
- Western Sydney Parklands, a large parkland situated in the suburb.
