= Kemp Creek =

Stream in the Georgia, US

Coordinates: 33°38′39.47″N 82°33′8.47″W

Kemp Creek is a stream in the US state of Georgia.

Kemp Creek was named after John Kemp, a pioneer settler and landowner. A variant name is "Kemps Creek".
