= Cecil Park, New South Wales =

Cecil Park
- Suburb
- Interactive map of Cecil Park
- Country: Australia
- State: New South Wales
- City: Sydney
- LGAs: City of Fairfield; City of Liverpool
- Location: 50 km (31 mi) west of Sydney

Government
  - State electorates: Badgerys Creek; Leppington
  - Federal divisions: McMahon; Werriwa

Area
  - Total: 14.4 km^{2} (5.6 sq mi)

Population
  - Total: 815 (2021 census)
  - Density: 56.60/km^{2} (146.6/sq mi)
- Postcode: 2178
- Gazetted: 1972
Suburbs around Cecil Park
Mount Vernon	Horsley Park	Abbotsbury
Kemps Creek	Cecil Park	Cecil Hills Elizabeth Hills
Austral; Kemps Creek	Austral; West Hoxton	Middleton Grange

Cecil Park is a suburb of Sydney, in the state of New South Wales, Australia 50 kilometres west of the Sydney central business district, split between the local government areas of the City of Fairfield and the City of Liverpool. It is part of the Greater Western Sydney region.

== History ==
Cecil Park was originally home to the Cabrogal people who occupied much of the greater Fairfield area. When European exploration of the area began in the early 19th century, a nearby range was named Cecil Hills and this in turn inspired the name Cecil Park. The first white settler in Cecil Park was Simeon Lord.

Cecil Park was part of a large land grant made to Thomas Wylde in 1817, then known as 'Macquarie Park'. His son, Sir John Wylde inherited the land in 1821. The Wylde family continued to own the land until 1886, when it was sold and subdivided into large lots, and then smaller rural lots in 1906. In 1896, a school building and accompanying teacher's residence was built, near the present-day location of the Elizabeth Drive-Wallgrove Road intersection. The first schoolmaster was Mr. William Flood, who also managed the Cecil Park Post Office opened on 16 July 1897.

Prior to the construction of a church, religious services were held at a local creamery. In 1903, a church dedicated to St Paul was built, which also served as a community hall. Mr. Flood continued as schoolmaster until 1904, followed by various educators, with Alderman Wilf Davis being the last master until the school's closure in 1940.

The post office operated until 1963, and the church closed shortly after its Golden Jubilee in 1953. All three buildings were demolished in 1965. Archaeological investigations in 2019 confirmed the remnants of the former school and church.

== Demographics ==
At the 2021 census, there were 815 residents in Cecil Park. 60.1% of people were born in Australia. The most common other countries of birth were Italy 6.9%, Iraq 3.6%, Iran 3.1%, Malta 2.6% and Fiji 2.2%. In Cecil Park 51.7% of people only spoke English at home. Other languages spoken at home included Italian 9.8%, Arabic 5.0%, Croatian 3.4%, Assyrian Neo-Aramaic 3.2% and Maltese 2.9%.

Common ancestries include, Italian 31.4%, Australian 16.4%, Maltese 8.7%, English 7.6% and Croatian 5.2%. The most common response for religion was Catholic at 52.8%.

== Recreation ==
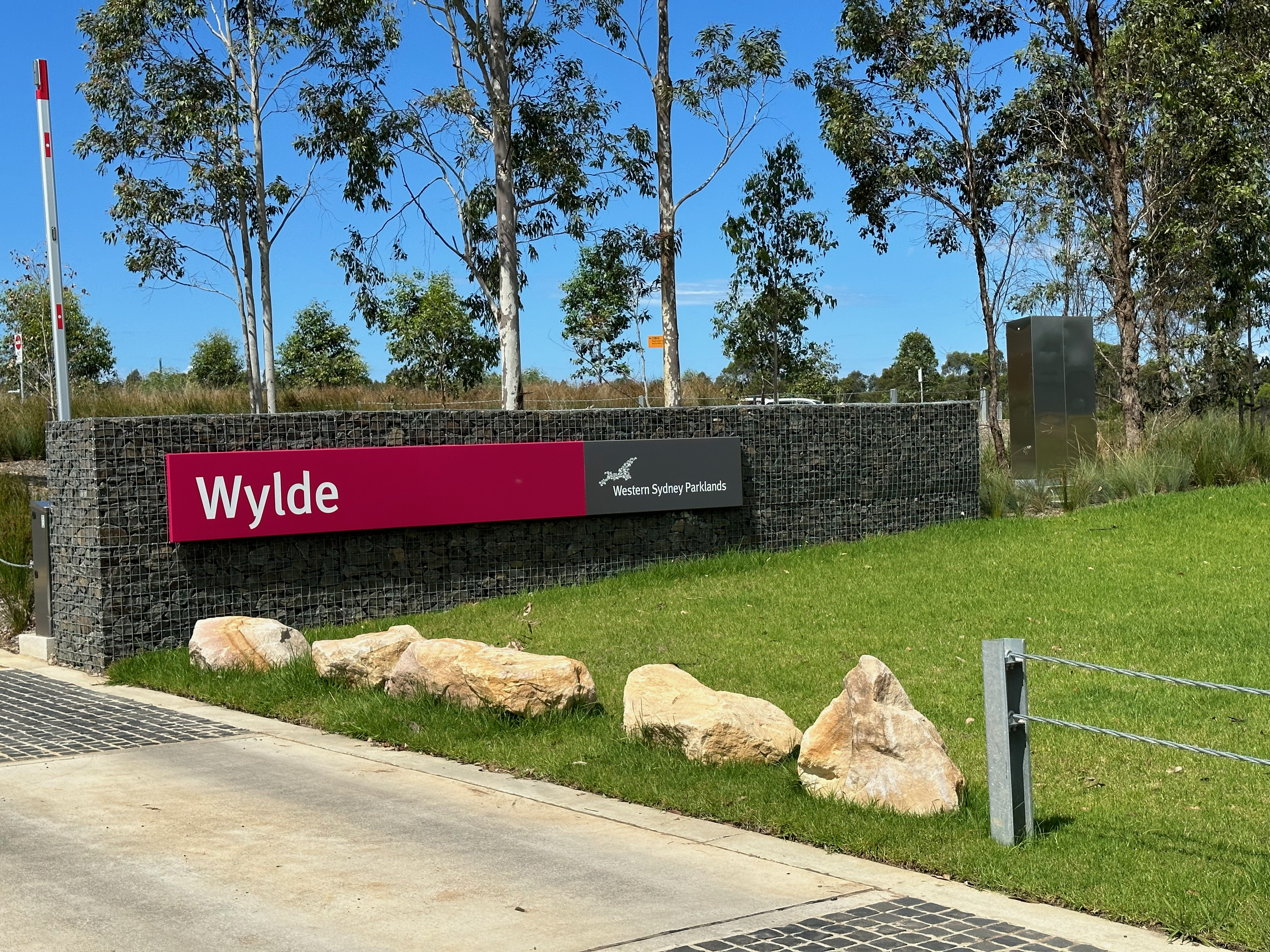
Wylde, Western Sydney Parklands

The Sydney International Shooting Centre was built in Cecil Park for the shooting events at the 2000 Summer Olympics. It remains open to licensed shooters for recreational use. An Indigenous art installation titled 'Seven Spears' by Brook Andrew can be found outside the shooting centre.

The nearby 'Wylde Mountain Bike and BMX' hub has more than 15 km of mountain bike trails, a BMX track, and a pump track.
