= Kemps Creek =

- Suburb
- Interactive map of Kemps Creek
- Country: Australia
- State: New South Wales
- City: Sydney
- LGAs: City of Penrith; City of Liverpool
- Location: 39 km (24 mi) west of Sydney CBD

Government
  - State electorates: Leppington; Badgerys Creek
  - Federal divisions: McMahon; Werriwa
- Elevation: 63 m (207 ft)

Population
  - Total: 2,121 (2021 census)
- Postcode: 2178
Suburbs around Kemps Creek
Orchard Hills	Erskine Park	Horsley Park
Luddenham Badgerys Creek	Kemps Creek	Mount Vernon Cecil Park
Bradfield	Rossmore	Austral

Kemps Creek is a suburb of Sydney, in the state of New South Wales, Australia. It is approximately 39 kilometres (24 mi) west of the Sydney central business district, in the local government areas of the City of Penrith and City of Liverpool. It is part of the Greater Western Sydney region.

== History ==
Kemps Creek is named after Anthony Fenn Kemp (1773–1868), who was granted two adjoining properties in this district. The first grant here was 300 acres (1.2 km^{2}) in 1810, straddling Elizabeth Drive and Mamre Road. The other was 500 acres (2.0 km^{2}) granted in 1820 and named Mount Vernon. A school was established in 1885 called Exeter Farm School after the large property subdivision in neighbouring Badgerys Creek but the name was changed a few years later to Kemps Creek Public School.

Kemps Creek Post Office opened on 27 March 1925.

== Population ==
In the 2021 Census, there were 2,121 people in Kemps Creek. 63.1% of people were born in Australia. The next most common country of birth was Italy at 5.8%. 53.0% of people spoke only English at home. Other languages spoken at home included Italian 8.6% and Arabic 7.6%. The most common responses for religion were Catholic 45.7% and No Religion 15.1%.

== Commercial area ==
Elizabeth Drive runs through the suburb horizontally, and on it are the Rural Fire Service, petrol stations, cafes, telephone, post office and Bill Anderson Park, which has a playground and toilet facilities. The Kemps Creek commercial area is also now home to the new Animal Welfare League NSW shelter that rehomes surrendered and abandoned animals plus offer pet boarding. The northern half of the suburb is dedicated to logistics warehouse and other offices such as The YARDS, Aspect Industrial Estate or Yiribana.

== Geography ==
The suburb is bound to the west by South Creek, and to the south-east by Kemps Creek. A number of reservoirs dot the landscape. The Kemps Creek Memorial Park is located on Western Road. The southern border is Fifteenth Avenue. To the north Mamre Road runs from south-east to north-west through the suburb. Kemps Creek flows into the main reservoir and then joins South Creek. The Mills Cross, a radio telescope, is situated between South Creek and the main reservoir, near Argus Technologies. The University of Sydney runs the Fleurs Radio Observatory and Fleurs Farm sites. Industry is present in such forms as Roladuct. In the far north of the suburb Ropes Creek flows in the north-west in a south-north direction and in the north-west, west of Mamre Road, is Cosgrove Hill. The northern boundary is the Sydney Water Supply Pipeline which goes from Prospect Reservoir to the west.

== Transport ==
The suburb of Kemps Creek is connected by the M12 Motorway.

== Schools ==
Kemps Creek has five schools, Kemps Creek Public School, Christadelphian Heritage College Sydney both located on Cross Street, and Mamre Anglican School, Trinity Catholic Primary School and Emmaus Catholic College located on Bakers Lane to the north.
