= Cecil Hills =

- Suburb
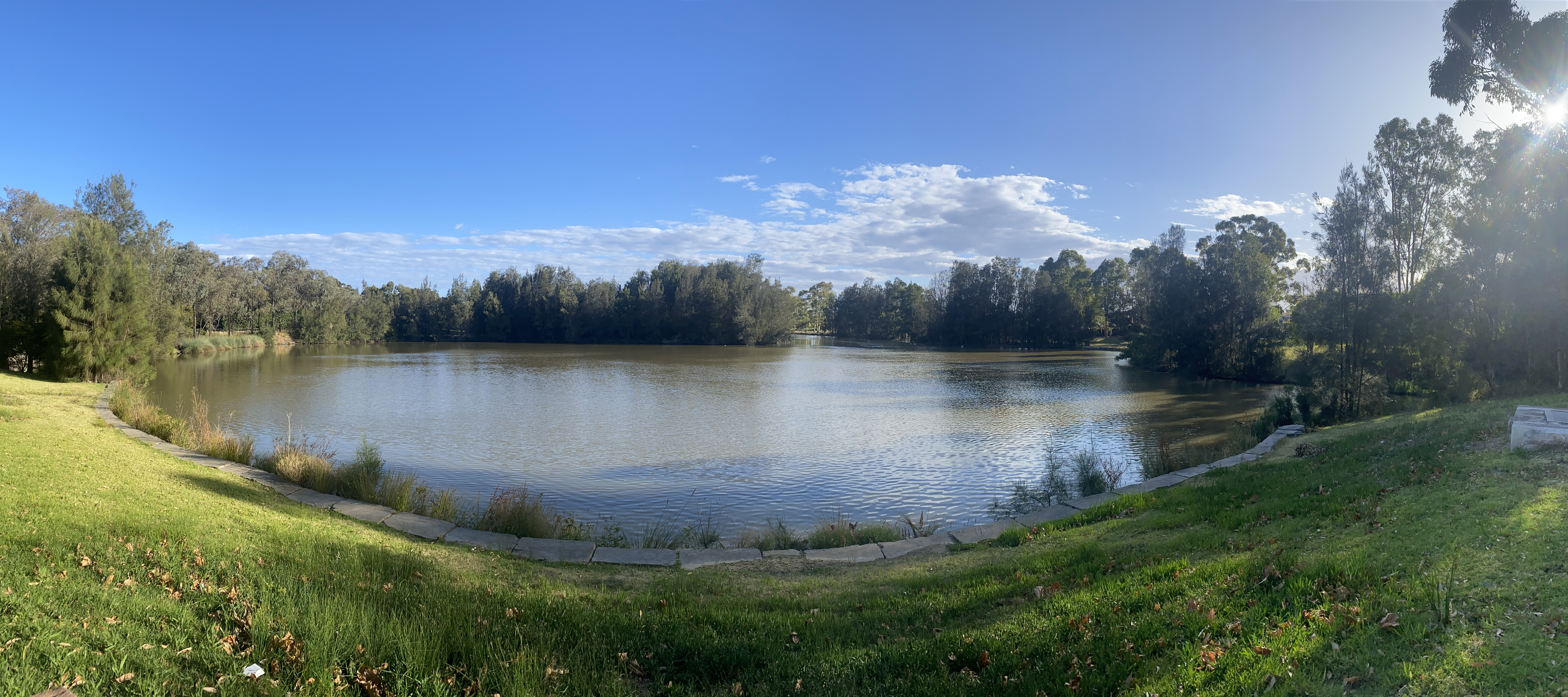
- Doujon Lake, Cecil Hills

- Interactive map of Cecil Hills
- Country: Australia
- State: New South Wales
- City: Sydney
- LGA: City of Liverpool
- Location: 38 km (24 mi) west of Sydney
- Established: 1992

Government
  - State electorate: Liverpool
  - Federal division: Werriwa

Population
  - Total: 6,906 (2021 census)
- Postcode: 2171
Suburbs around Cecil Hills
Cecil Park	Abbotsbury	Edensor Park
Cecil Park	Cecil Hills	Bonnyrigg Heights
Middleton Grange	Elizabeth Hills	Green Valley

Cecil Hills is a suburb of Sydney, in the state of New South Wales, Australia. Cecil Hills is located 38 kilometres west of the Sydney central business district, in the local government area of the City of Liverpool and is part of the Greater Western Sydney region.

== History ==
In 1817, John Wylde, the judge-advocate of New South Wales, was granted 2,000 acres (8.1 km^{2}) in the Parish of Cabramatta. He named his property Cecil Hills after his British property in Cheshunt, Hertfordshire. He lived on the property only briefly before leaving to become Chief Justice of the Cape of Good Hope in South Africa. His wife Elizabeth remained, however, and managed the property until her death in 1864. It continued as a farm through until the 1980s when it was decided to redevelop it for housing. The suburb of Cecil Hills was named in 1992 and includes part of the old Cecil Hills property along with other neighbouring.

In 2009, land in the south of Cecil Hills was subdivided for Elizabeth Hills. Sometime between 2011-2016, the boundary of Cecil Hills expanded westward, incorporating parkland previously part of Cecil Park. In 2019-2020, a tract of dry grass was set ablaze by illegal fireworks, resulting in a bushfire.

== Heritage listings ==
Cecil Hills has a number of heritage-listed sites, including:

- Sandringham Drive: Cecil Hills Farm

== Population ==
According to the 2021 census, there were 6,906 residents in Cecil Hills. 52.8% of people were born in Australia. The most common other countries of birth were Iraq 9.3%, Vietnam 5.3%, Philippines 2.8%, Cambodia 2.0% and Fiji 1.9%.

In Cecil Hills 37.9% of people only spoke English at home. Other languages spoken at home included Arabic 8.4%, Vietnamese 8.0%, Assyrian Neo-Aramaic 6.8%, Spanish 3.1%, Chaldean Neo-Aramaic 2.9%. Noting that Assyrian and Chaldean Neo-Aramaic are dialects of the same language (Sureth), the total percentage of Neo-Aramaic speakers totals to 9.7%.

The most common responses for religion were Catholic 41.5%, No Religion 10.5%, Buddhism 9.2%, Islam 6.1% and Eastern Orthodox 6.1%.

== Commercial area ==
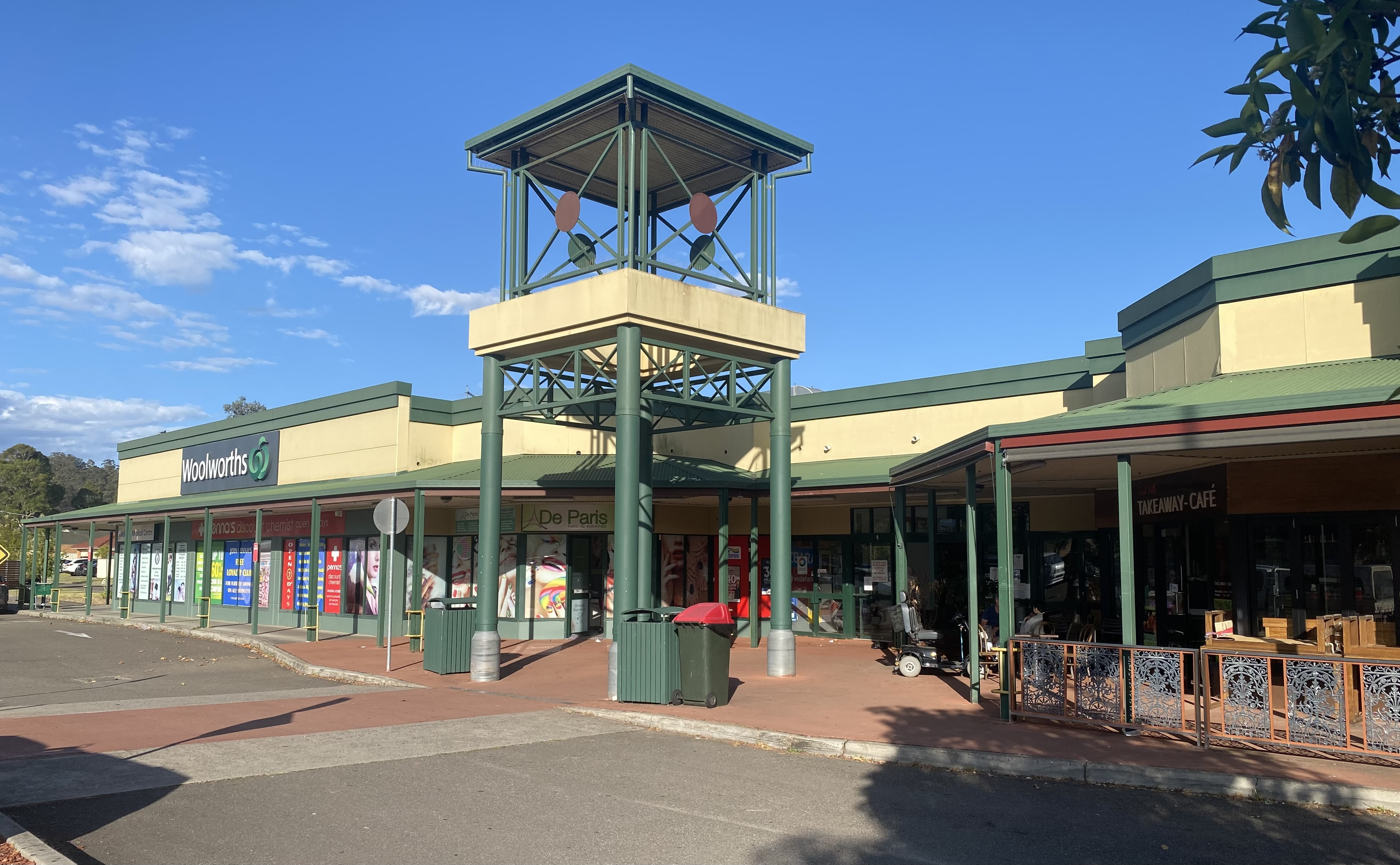
Cecil Hills Shopping Village

Cecil Hills Shopping Village is the local shopping centre of Cecil Hills. Its anchor tenant is Woolworths. The shopping centre also has a medical centre and various specialty shops.

== Transport ==
Transit Systems NSW operates bus routes connecting Cecil Hills to Cabramatta and Liverpool. Cecil Hills is located south-west of the intersection of Cowpasture Road and Elizabeth Drive. The suburb is also the site of the eastern terminus of the M12 Motorway and its interchange connecting to the M7 Motorway.

== Recreation ==
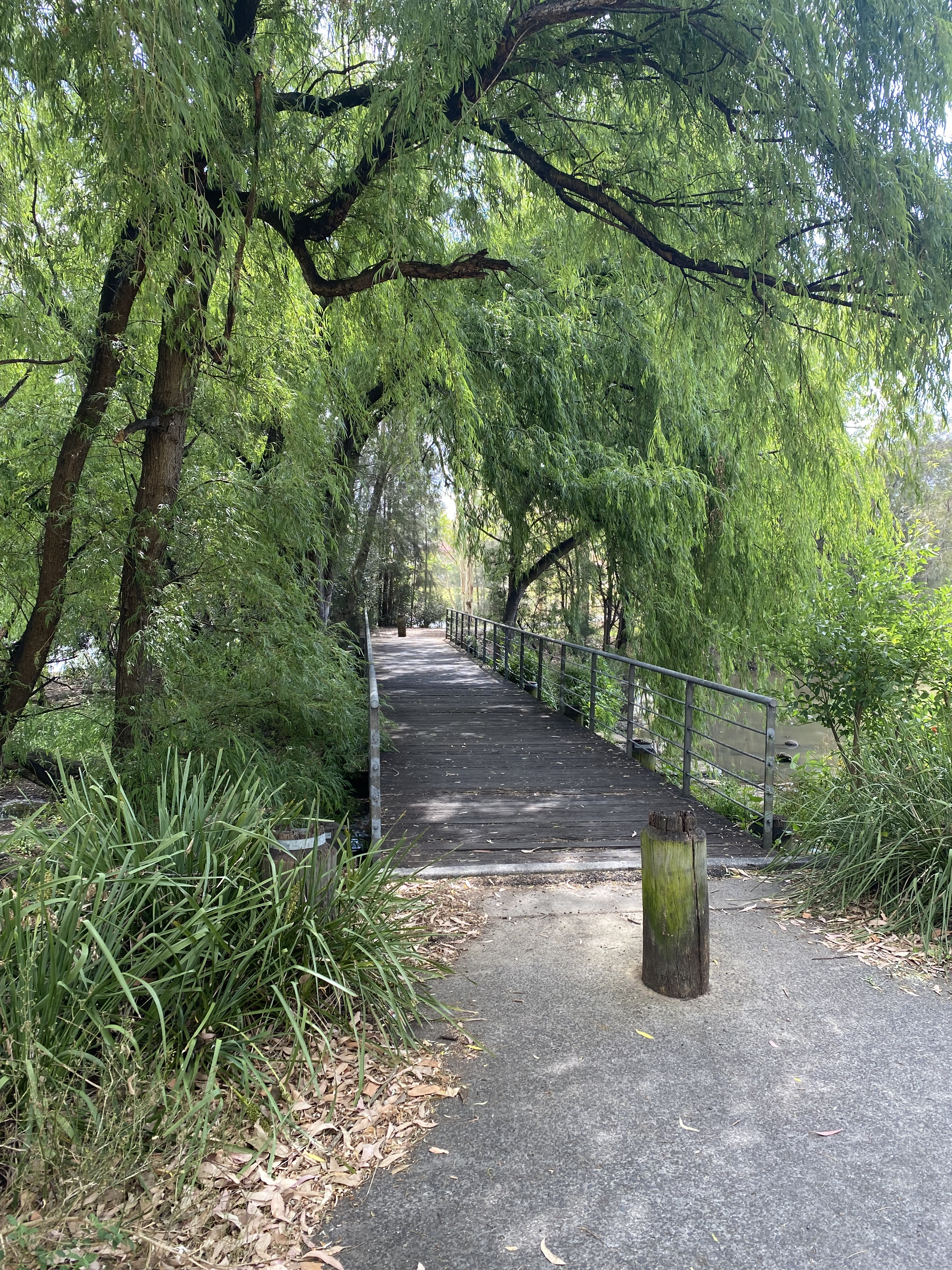
A footbridge in Dunumbral Park

Dunumbral Park is the central park of Cecil Hills, in which there is a lake, walking paths and two playgrounds. The lake was named Doujon Lake in 2013, in memory of a resident who lived next to it. The lake is artificial, formerly part of a farming dam that had been created along a natural watercourse. Adjoined to the south is Gough Park, which was named after James Gough, the builder of the Cecil Hills Farm.

Pye Hill Reserve is another recreational space, situated next to Cecil Hills Public School. The reserve features a playground adjacent to the school, and walking paths to the east. It began construction in 2024.

Western Sydney Parklands has maintained natural bushland in the west of Cecil Hills, albeit separated from the residential area by the construction of the M7 Motorway. This area of the parklands has the 'Cecil Hills Walking Track', which is accessible to pedestrians via two footbridges across the motorway. The M7 cycleway also runs along this motorway, which cyclists can access using a pathway from Kensington Close. The 'Plough and Harrow' area of the Western Sydney Regional Park is also north of Cecil Hills, which has a café, playground, and picnic areas.

== Schools ==
Cecil Hills High School opened in 1996. It offers a comprehensive curriculum, including English, Mathematics, Science, Geography, History, Commerce, Italian, Music, Visual Arts, Personal Development, Physical Education and Health and a variety of Technology subjects. Sport, School Choir, School Band Program, Computer Technology, Debating and Drama enhance the curriculum. In 2022, an upgrade was planned to add a new multi-storey block of classrooms and hall extension, with construction beginning the following year.

The high school's four houses are:

- Chisholm – Green
- Goolagong – Yellow
- Hollows – Red
- Whitlam – Blue

Cecil Hills Public School opened in 2003. The school is fairly large, with brick classrooms and demountables. The playground has two basketball/netball courts, a soccer/football field and areas for handball. Uniform is navy blue and white, with navy blue hats. The school was upgraded in 2019, adding a new block with 15 teaching spaces.

The primary school's four houses are:

- Edinburgh – Green
- Spencer – Yellow
- Sandringham – Red
- Leopold – Blue

== Utilities ==
Cecil Hills has historically been a strategic site of water infrastructure for western Sydney. The Liverpool Offtake Reservoir was constructed in 1890 to supply the township of Liverpool, as part of the Upper Nepean Scheme. In the 1900s, two water tank sites were built (within the area of present-day Cecil Hills), namely Cecil Park reservoir and Liverpool reservoir. A new pressure main was installed in 2022 to transfer water supply from the Liverpool reservoir to the Cecil Park reservoir.

In 2023, the Liverpool reservoir site was upgraded with a new water tank and pumping station, adding 115 megalitres of reservoir capacity to supply the growing suburbs of south-west Sydney. The new pumping station superseded the role of the nearby Bonnyrigg Pumping Station, which was built in 1941.

There are also three telecommunications towers situated near the Cecil Park reservoir, one of which is an Airservices Australia radar.

== See also ==
- Cecil Hills Farm
