= Kemps Creek (watercourse) =

Lake in Sydney, Australia

Coordinates: 33°50′S 150°47′E

Kemps Creek is a creek located in Sydney, Australia. It is a tributary of South Creek which flows into the Hawkesbury River. The source of the creek is about 2 km east by north of Catherine Field and flows in a roughly northerly direction through the suburbs of Austral (where it joins with its tributary Bonds Creek) and Kemps Creek (where, after approximately 17 km, it enters South Creek).
