= Electoral district of Leppington =

Leppington New South Wales—Legislative Assembly
- Interactive map of district boundaries from the 2023 state election
- State: New South Wales
- Created: 2023
- MP: Nathan Hagarty
- Party: Labor
- Namesake: Leppington, New South Wales
- Electors: 51,604 (estimated) (2019)
- Demographic: Outer metropolitan
Electorates around Leppington:
Badgerys Creek	Badgerys Creek	Badgerys Creek
Badgerys Creek	Leppington	Liverpool; Holsworthy
Camden	Campbelltown	Macquarie Fields

Leppington is an electoral district of the Legislative Assembly in the Australian state of New South Wales in Sydney's south-west. It was contested for the first time at the 2023 New South Wales state election.

== Geography ==
On its current boundaries, Leppington takes in the suburbs of Austral, Carnes Hill, Catherine Field, Eagle Vale, Eschol Park, Horningsea Park, Kearns, Leppington, Middleton Grange, Raby, Rossmore, Varroville and West Hoxton, and part of Cecil Park, Denham Court, Hinchinbrook, Hoxton Park, Kemps Creek, Prestons, .

== History ==
Leppington was created in 2021 as a result of redistribution by the New South Wales Electoral Commission. It incorporated suburbs from the existing electorates of Camden, Campbelltown, Holsworthy, Liverpool, Macquarie Fields, and Mulgoa.

== Members for Leppington ==
Member	Party	Term
Nathan Hagarty	Labor	2023–present

== Election results ==
2023 New South Wales state election: Leppington
Party	Candidate	Votes	%	±%
Labor	Nathan Hagarty	25,499	50.3	+8.7
Liberal	Therese Fedeli	17,570	34.7	−5.4
One Nation	Mandar Tamhankar	3,807	7.5	+4.2
Greens	Apurva Shukla	2,536	5.0	+0.6
Sustainable Australia	Danica Sajn	1,254	2.5	+2.5
Total formal votes		50,666	95.0	−0.1
Informal votes		2,640	5.0	+0.1
Turnout		53,306	87.7	+2.1
Two-party-preferred result
Labor	Nathan Hagarty	27,625	58.9	+7.4
Liberal	Therese Fedeli	19,300	41.1	−7.4
Labor hold		Swing	+7.4	

== See also ==
- Electoral district of Badgerys Creek
- Electoral district of Camden
- Electoral district of Liverpool
- Electoral district of Macquarie Fields
