= Middleton Grange =

- Suburb
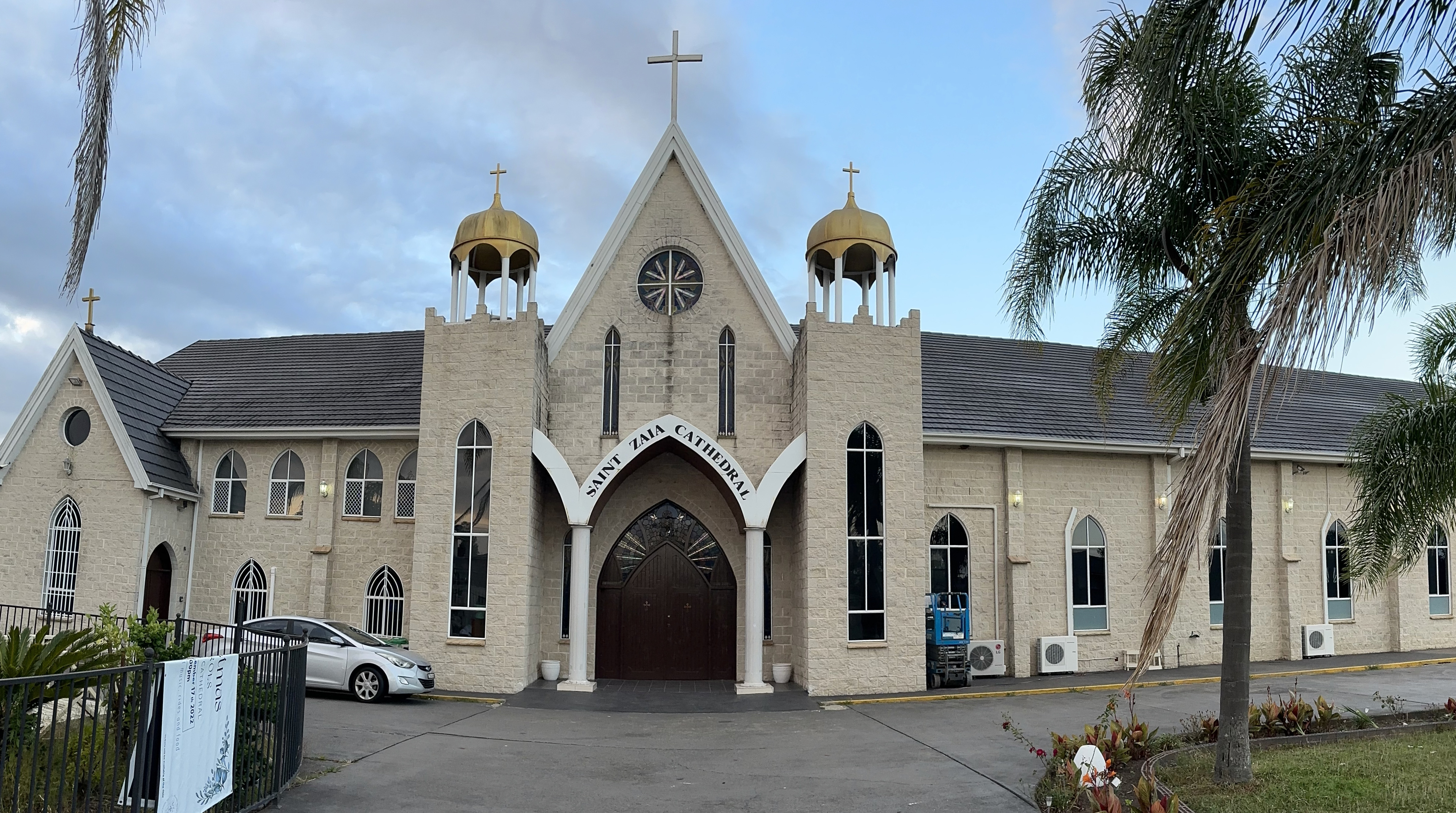
- St Zaia Cathedral

- Interactive map of Middleton Grange
- Country: Australia
- State: New South Wales
- City: Sydney
- LGA: City of Liverpool
- Location: 40 km (25 mi) west of Sydney
- Established: 2005

Government
  - State electorate: Leppington
  - Federal division: Werriwa

Population
  - Total: 7,043 (2021 census)
- Postcode: 2171
Suburbs around Middleton Grange
Cecil Park	Cecil Hills Elizabeth Hills	Green Valley
Austral West Hoxton	Middleton Grange	Hinchinbrook
Austral	West Hoxton	Hoxton Park

Middleton Grange is a suburb of Sydney, in the state of New South Wales, Australia. Middleton Grange is located 40 kilometres west of the Sydney central business district, in the local government area of the City of Liverpool and is part of the Greater Western Sydney region.

Middleton Grange consists of approx 2550 lots with provision made by Council. Major land developers are now developing and selling housing blocks (around 700 lots), along with some smaller land individual holders/farmers.

Middleton Grange has recycled water and high Council infrastructure contributions.

== History ==
The suburb was officially created in 2005. Middleton Grange was considered by Liverpool City Council for rezoning to residential lots in the early 1990s. This progressed with lobbying by the land owners and other interested parties until Liverpool City Council started moving forward in 1999.

LandPro Corporation, together with land owners continued to push the issue, attending numerous Council meetings until rezoning was achieved in 2005, with the Council acquiring land for drainage and other services, including sewer upgrading works (completed by Sydney Water).

== Demographics ==
In Middleton Grange, 55.2% of people were born in Australia. The most common countries of birth were Iraq 14.3%, Fiji 2.9%, Vietnam 1.8%, Philippines 1.6% and New Zealand 1.5%.

The most common ancestries in Middleton Grange were Australian 14.5%, Assyrian 13.3%, English 9.6%, Italian 8.9% and Iraqi 5.6%.

The most common responses for religion were Catholic 37.6%, No Religion 11.8%, Islam 8.2%, Assyrian Apostolic 6.9% and Eastern Orthodox 6.0%.

== Education ==
The area is serviced by two schools – Middleton Grange Public School opened in 2009 and Thomas Hassall Anglican College opened in 2000 and caters for pre school through to year 12.

== Places of worship and culture ==
The suburb is home to a prominent Assyrian church, St Zaia Cathedral, which is part of the Ancient Church of the East, an Eastern Christian denomination that follows the East Syriac Rite. It was established in 1996. The church's liturgical language is in Assyrian Neo-Aramaic and Syriac.

The Serbian Cultural Club, a now closed Serbian social club, is situated in this suburb.
