= Division of Werriwa =

Australian federal electoral division

Coordinates: 33.981°S 150.843°E

Werriwa Australian House of Representatives Division
- Interactive map of electorate boundaries from the 2025 federal election
- Created: 1901
- MP: Anne Stanley
- Party: Labor
- Namesake: Lake George (Aboriginal name)
- Electors: 117,827 (2025)
- Area: 111 km^{2} (42.9 sq mi)
- Demographic: Outer metropolitan
Electorates around Werriwa:
Lindsay	McMahon	Fowler
Hume	Werriwa	Fowler
Hume	Macarthur	Hughes

The Division of Werriwa is an Australian electoral division in the state of New South Wales. The name Werriwa derives from a local Aboriginal name for Lake George, which was located in the division when it was established in 1900. The division was one of the original 65 divisions first contested at the first federal election.

As of 2025, Werriwa covers an area west of Liverpool in south-west Sydney.

The current Member for Werriwa, since the 2016 federal election, is Anne Stanley, a member of the Australian Labor Party.

== Geography ==
When the division was created in 1900, it covered the south-western areas of the Southern Highlands and South West Slopes. It included areas such as Harden, Yass, Goulburn, Lake George and what would eventually later be northern Canberra. It was bordered by the Abercrombie River to the north and part of Molonglo River to the south. In 1906, it lost areas in the south including Lake George to the Division of Eden-Monaro, but gained Cootamundra and Young in the west from the divisions of Hume and Bland (abolished) respectively.

In 1913, it lost its southern one-third including Yass and Cootamundra to Eden-Monaro and Hume respectively, but gained areas to the north-west from Division of Calare. It also gained majority of the Southern Highlands and Camden in the north-east, marking its first expansion into the outskirts of Sydney. In 1922, it lost areas to the west to Hume and Calare, and parts of the Southern Highlands in the south-east to Eden-Monaro, but gained areas to the north-east such as Campbelltown, Sutherland Shire and Wollongong. This effectively shifted the division eastwards to the coast.

In 1934, it lost its western two-thirds such as Goulburn, mostly to the Division of Macquarie, and to a smaller extent the divisions of Hume and Eden-Monaro. However, it also gained small areas further east at Dapto in the Illawarra and Liverpool in Sydney. In 1949, it lost all areas west and south-west of Liverpool, including all remaining areas in the Southern Highlands, to the new Division of Macarthur. It also lost most of the Illawarra to the new division. In 1955, it lost all areas in the Sutherland Shire and any remaining areas in the Illawarra to the new Division of Hughes. As a result, the division became fully located within Western Sydney. In the same redistribution, the division was also expanded to the north to cover areas west of Parramatta, such as Westmead and Wentworthville. It lost these northern gains in 1968.

In 1977, the division was massively expanded to the south-west to again cover areas in the City of Campbelltown and Camden Council (but excluding Camden). Its extent covered as far as Appin to the south. It lost most of the Camden Council areas, Appin and Liverpool in 1983, and lost areas south of Campbelltown in 1992.

In 2000, it lost Campbelltown to the division of Macarthur. It also gained areas to the north-west such as Austral and Kemps Creek, but this was reversed in 2006. It regained Austral in 2009, In 2016, it lost its southern half to Macarthur but gained areas in the north and north-west, including Bonnyrigg, Kemps Creek, Badgerys Creek and Bringelly. This effectively shifted the division northwards. In 2024, it lost Badgerys Creek and the new suburb of Bradfield (previously part of Bringelly) to Hume, and lost Glenfield and Macquarie Fields to Hughes.

Since 1934, there is no longer an overlap between the division and the area it originally covered at federation, as the division had effectively moved north-east towards Sydney in the first thirty years of federation.

Since 2025, the division is located in the southwestern Sydney mostly in the City of Liverpool (but excluding the suburb itself), and small areas in the local government areas of Campbelltown and Fairfield. The division includes the suburbs of Ashcroft, Austral, Bonnyrigg Heights, Busby, Carnes Hill, Cartwright, Casula, Cecil Hills, Edmondson Park, Green Valley, Heckenberg, Hinchinbrook, Horningsea Park, Hoxton Park, Lurnea, Middleton Grange, Miller, Prestons, Sadleir, and West Hoxton; as well as parts of Bonnyrigg, Glenfield, Kemps Creek, Mount Pritchard, and Rossmore.

== History ==
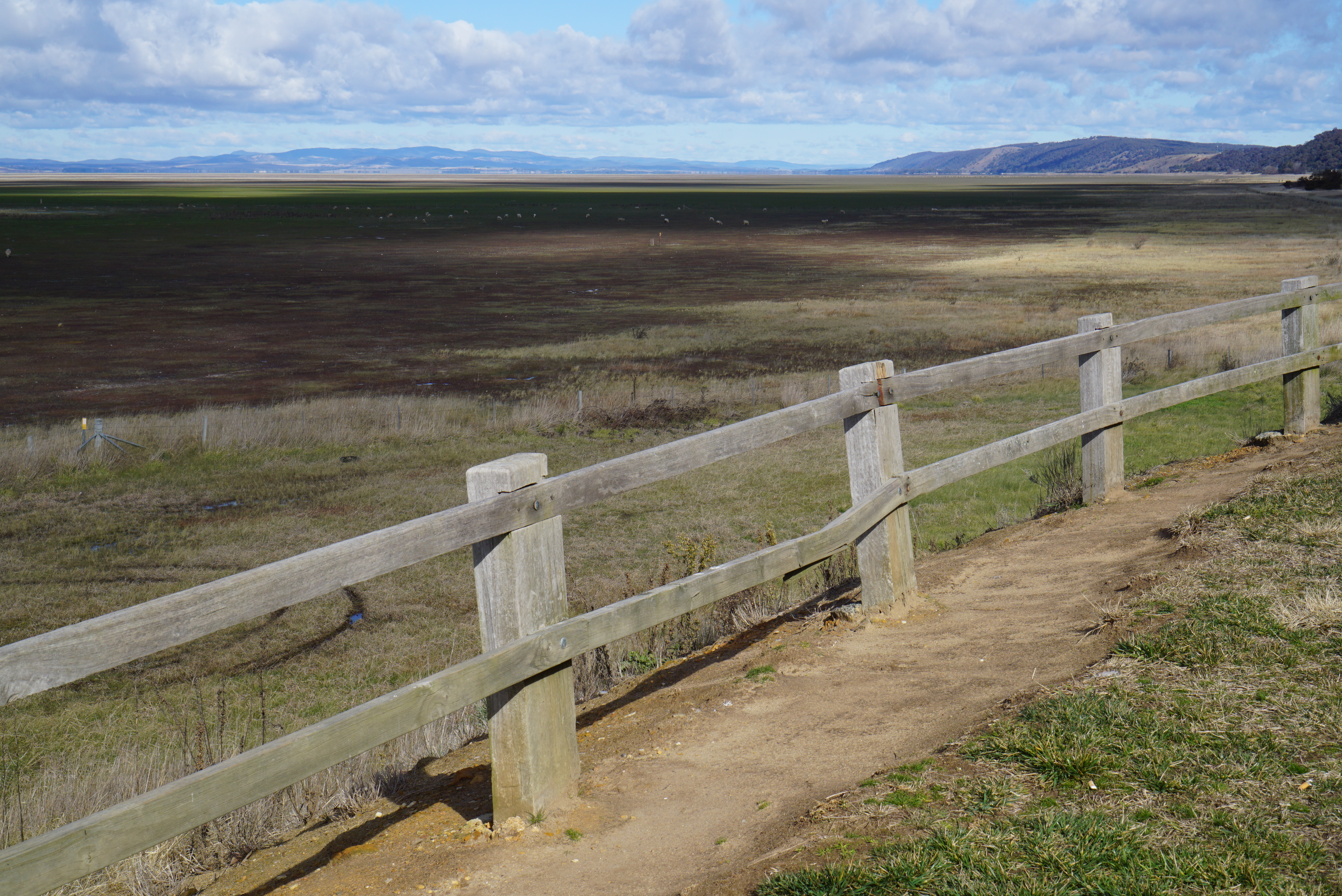
Lake George, the Aboriginal name of which is the division's namesake

Originally, Werriwa was a large and mostly rural electorate that stretched from south-west Sydney to the northern part of what is now the ACT, and included the Southern Highlands, Goulburn, and part of the South West Slopes. In succeeding years, with demographic change and electoral redistributions, Werriwa began to shrink and, from 1913 onwards, no longer included Lake George. It underwent several other major changes to its borders over the years. The 1949 expansion of Parliament saw Werriwa lose most of its remaining rural territory to the newly created Division of Macarthur and move to approximately its current position in south-west Sydney, over 150 kilometres (93 mi) away from Lake George. However, it has retained the name of Werriwa, primarily as it is an original Federation electorate—the Australian Electoral Commission's guidelines on electoral redistributions require it to preserve the names of original Federation electorates where possible.

It is a very safe seat for Labor, which has held it continuously since 1934 and for all but nine years since 1906.

Werriwa is best remembered for being the electorate of former Prime Minister Gough Whitlam, who held it from 1952 to 1978. It was represented from 1994 to 2005 by one of Whitlam's former aides, Mark Latham, the leader of the ALP and Leader of the Opposition from 2003 to 2005. In more recent times, a by-election in March 2005 resulted in Labor's Chris Hayes elected with over 55% of the vote, in a 16-candidate race which saw no other candidate poll above 8%.

== Demographics ==
Werriwa is a heavily working class electorate and is considered part of Labor's Western Sydney "Red Wall" (seats that are reliably safe for Labor).

Werriwa is home to relatively large immigrant communities. According to the 2021 census, 68.3% of residents had both parents born outside of Australia. 37.6% of people only speak English at home. Other languages spoken at home include Arabic at 11.4%, Vietnamese at 6.4%, Hindi at 3.6%, Assyrian Neo-Aramaic at 2.5% and Spanish at 2.2%.

== Members ==
Image	Member	Party	Term	Notes
	Alfred Conroy (1864–1920)	Free Trade	29 March 1901 – 1906	Lost seat
	Alfred Conroy (1864–1920)	Anti-Socialist	1906 – 12 December 1906	Lost seat
	David Hall (1874–1945)	Labor	12 December 1906 – 1 April 1912	Previously held the New South Wales Legislative Assembly seat of Gunnedah. Resigned to become a member of the New South Wales Legislative Council
	Benjamin Bennett (1872–1939)	Labor	1 June 1912 – 23 April 1913	Retired
	Alfred Conroy (1864–1920)	Liberal	31 May 1913 – 5 September 1914	Lost seat
	John Lynch (1862–1941)	Labor	5 September 1914 – 14 November 1916	Lost seat
	John Lynch (1862–1941)	National Labor	14 November 1916 – 17 February 1917	Lost seat
	John Lynch (1862–1941)	Nationalist	17 February 1917 – 13 December 1919	Lost seat
	Bert Lazzarini (1884–1952)	Labor	13 December 1919 – 27 March 1931	Lost seat
	Bert Lazzarini (1884–1952)	Labor (NSW)	27 March 1931 – 19 December 1931	Lost seat
	Walter McNicoll (1877–1947)	Country	19 December 1931 – 14 September 1934	Resigned to become Administrator of the Territory of New Guinea
	Bert Lazzarini (1884–1952)	Labor (NSW)	15 September 1934 – February 1936	Served as minister under Curtin, Forde and Chifley. Died in office
	Bert Lazzarini (1884–1952)	Labor	February 1936 – 1 October 1952	Served as minister under Curtin, Forde and Chifley. Died in office
	Gough Whitlam (1916–2014)	Labor	29 November 1952 – 31 July 1978	Served as Opposition Leader from 1967 to 1972, and from 1975 to 1977. Served as Prime Minister from 1972 to 1975. Resigned to retire from politics
	John Kerin (1937–2023)	Labor	23 September 1978 – 22 December 1993	Previously held the Division of Macarthur. Served as minister under Hawke and Keating. Resigned to retire from politics
	Mark Latham (1961–)	Labor	29 January 1994 – 21 January 2005	Served as Opposition Leader from 2003 to 2005. Resigned to retire from politics. Later elected to the New South Wales Legislative Council in 2019
	Chris Hayes (1955–)	Labor	19 March 2005 – 21 August 2010	Transferred to the Division of Fowler
	Laurie Ferguson (1952–)	Labor	21 August 2010 – 9 May 2016	Previously held the Division of Reid. Retired
	Anne Stanley (1961–)	Labor	2 July 2016 – present	Incumbent

== Election results ==
2025 Australian federal election: Werriwa
Party	Candidate	Votes	%	±%
Labor	Anne Stanley	35,785	40.84	+1.71
Liberal	Sam Kayal	27,003	30.82	−0.08
Greens	Janet Castle	9,747	11.12	+4.48
One Nation	Ian Cimera	3,499	3.99	−0.99
Legalise Cannabis	Andrew Murphy	3,005	3.43	+3.43
Libertarian	Gemma Noiosi	2,802	3.20	−5.92
Independent	Jamal Daoud	2,232	2.55	+2.55
Trumpet of Patriots	Shannon McGlone	1,800	2.05	+2.05
Family First	Jacob Balestri	1,741	1.99	+1.99
Total formal votes		87,614	82.74	−7.08
Informal votes		18,274	17.26	+7.08
Turnout		105,888	89.90	+7.39
Two-party-preferred result
Labor	Anne Stanley	49,741	56.77	+1.43
Liberal	Sam Kayal	37,873	43.23	−1.43
Labor hold		Swing	+1.43	

2022 Australian federal election: Werriwa
Party	Candidate	Votes	%	±%
Labor	Anne Stanley	40,108	39.86	−7.90
Liberal	Sam Kayal	30,864	30.67	−4.60
Liberal Democrats	Victor Tey	8,978	8.92	+8.92
United Australia	Tony Nikolic	8,813	8.76	+4.56
Greens	Apurva Shukla	6,772	6.73	+1.36
One Nation	Adam Booke	5,096	5.06	+5.06
Total formal votes		100,631	90.18	+1.75
Informal votes		10,962	9.82	−1.75
Turnout		111,593	88.53	−2.00
Two-party-preferred result
Labor	Anne Stanley	56,173	55.82	+0.35
Liberal	Sam Kayal	44,458	44.18	−0.35
Labor hold		Swing	+0.35	

Alluvial diagram for preference flows in the seat of Werriwa in the 2022 federal election. indicates at what stage the winning candidate had over 50% of the votes and was declared the winner.
