= City of Liverpool (New South Wales) =

- Local government area
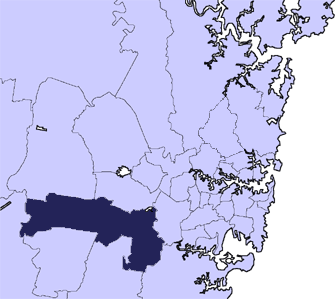
- Location in Metropolitan Sydney

- Interactive map of City of Liverpool
- Coordinates: 33°56′S 150°55′E
- Country: Australia
- State: New South Wales
- Region: Greater Western Sydney
- Established: 27 June 1872 (as a municipal district)
- Council seat: Liverpool

Government
  - Mayor: Ned Mannoun
  - State electorates: Badgerys Creek Cabramatta; Holsworthy; Leppington; Liverpool; Macquarie Fields Wollondilly
  - Federal divisions: Fowler; Hughes; Hume; Werriwa

Area
  - Total: 305.5 km^{2} (118.0 sq mi)

Population
  - Totals: 204,326 (2016 census) (18th (Australia); 9th (NSW)); 223,304 (2018 est.)
  - Density: 668.82/km^{2} (1,732.25/sq mi)
- Time zone: UTC+10 (AEST)
  - Summer (DST): UTC+11 (AEDT)
- Website: City of Liverpool
LGAs around City of Liverpool
Penrith	Fairfield	Fairfield
Wollondilly	City of Liverpool	Canterbury-Bankstown
Camden	Campbelltown	Sutherland

The City of Liverpool is a local government area, administered by Liverpool City Council, located in the south-west of Sydney, in the state of New South Wales, Australia. The area encompasses 305.5 square kilometres (118.0 sq mi) and its administrative centre is located in the suburb of Liverpool.

The mayor of the city is Ned Mannoun, a member of the Liberal Party.

== Suburbs and localities in the local government area ==
The following suburbs and localities are located within the City of Liverpool:

- Ashcroft
- Austral
- Badgerys Creek
- Bradfield
- Bringelly (shared with Camden)
- Busby
- Carnes Hill
- Cartwright
- Casula
- Cecil Hills
- Cecil Park (shared with Fairfield)
- Chipping Norton
- Denham Court (shared with Campbelltown)
- Edmondson Park
- Green Valley
- Greendale
- Hammondville
- Heckenberg
- Hinchinbrook
- Holsworthy (shared with City of Campbelltown and Sutherland Shire)
- Horningsea Park
- Hoxton Park
- Kemps Creek (shared with Penrith)
- Leppington (shared with Camden)
- Liverpool
- Luddenham (shared with Penrith)
- Lurnea
- Middleton Grange
- Miller
- Moorebank
- Mount Pritchard (shared with Fairfield)
- Pleasure Point
- Prestons
- Rossmore (shared with Camden)
- Sadleir
- Voyager Point
- Wallacia (shared with Penrith)
- Warwick Farm
- Wattle Grove
- West Hoxton

== Demographics ==
At the 2016 census there were 204,326 people in the Liverpool local government area, of these 49.6 per cent were male and 50.4 per cent were female. Aboriginal and Torres Strait Islander people made up 1.5 per cent of the population; significantly below the NSW and Australian averages of 2.9 and 2.8 per cent respectively. The median age of people in the City of Liverpool was 33 years; significantly lower than the national median of 38 years. Children aged 0 – 14 years made up 22.7 per cent of the population and people aged 65 years and over made up 10.4 per cent of the population. Of people in the area aged 15 years and over, 51.8 per cent were married and 11.0 per cent were either divorced or separated.

Population growth in the City of Liverpool between the 2001 census and the 2006 census was 7.14 per cent and in the subsequent five years to the 2011 census, population growth was 9.44 per cent. At the 2016 census, the population in the City increased by 13.24 per cent. When compared with total population growth of Australia for the same period, being 8.8 per cent, population growth in the Liverpool local government area was significantly higher than the national average. The median weekly income for residents within the City of Liverpool was lower than the national average.

At the 2016 census, the area was linguistically diverse, with a significantly higher than average proportion (57.2 per cent) where two or more languages are spoken (national average was 22.2 per cent); and a significantly lower proportion (41.4 per cent) where English only was spoken at home (national average was 72.7 per cent). The proportion of residents who stated a religious affiliation with Islam was in excess of four times the national average; and the proportion of residents with no religion slightly less than one–third the national average.

Selected historical census data for Liverpool local government area
Census year		2001	2006	2011	2016	2021
Population	Estimated residents on census night	153,633	164,603	180,143	204,326	233,446
Population	LGA rank in terms of size within New South Wales		16th	▲12th	▲9th	▲7th
Population	% of New South Wales population	2.43%	▲2.51%	▲2.60%	▲2.73%	▲2.89%
Population	% of Australian population	0.82%	▲0.83%	0.83%	▲0.87%	▲0.92%
Median weekly incomes						
Personal income	Median weekly personal income		A$440	A$510	A$584	A$698
Personal income	% of Australian median income		94.4%	▼88.4%	▼88.2%	▼86.2%
Family income	Median weekly family income		A$1,082	A$1,401	A$1,663	A$2,001
Family income	% of Australian median income		105.4%	▼94.6%	▲95.9%	▼94.4%
Household income	Median weekly household income		A$1,155	A$1,299	A$1,550	A$1,819
Household income	% of Australian median income		98.6%	▲105.7%	▲107.8%	▼104.2%

Selected historical census data for Liverpool local government area
Ancestry, top responses
2001		2006		2011		2016		2021	
No Data		No Data		Australian	15.5%	Australian	▼13.4%	Australian	▲15.6%
No Data		No Data		English	12.6%	English	▼11.3%	English	▲12.2%
No Data		No Data		Italian	6.1%	Italian	▼5.4%	Indian	▲6.0%
No Data		No Data		Indian	4.9%	Indian	▲5.2%	Lebanese	▲5.9%
No Data		No Data		Lebanese	4.3%	Lebanese	▲4.8%	Italian	▲5.7%
Country of birth, top responses
2001		2006		2011		2016		2021	
Australia	55.6%	Australia	▼53.8%	Australia	53.8%	Australia	▼51.7%	Australia	▼51.2%
Fiji	2.9%	Fiji	▲3.2%	Fiji	▲3.6%	Iraq	▲4.8%	Iraq	▲6.1%
Vietnam	2.7%	Vietnam	▲2.8%	Iraq	▲3.4%	Vietnam	▲3.3%	Vietnam	▲3.6%
Italy	2.1%	Iraq	▲2.0%	Vietnam	▲2.9%	Fiji	▼3.2%	Fiji	▼3.0%
Lebanon	2.0%	Lebanon	2.0%	India	▲2.3%	India	▲2.6%	India	▲2.8%
England	1.9%	Philippines	▲1.9%	Philippines	▲2.0%	Lebanon	2.0%	Lebanon	▲2.2%
Language, top responses (other than English)
2001		2006		2011		2016		2021	
Arabic	6.4%	Arabic	▲7.6%	Arabic	▲9.5%	Arabic	▲11.4%	Arabic	▲13.1%
Italian	3.8%	Vietnamese	▲4.1%	Hindi	▲4.5%	Vietnamese	▲4.9%	Vietnamese	▲5.3%
Vietnamese	3.6%	Hindi	▲3.8%	Vietnamese	▲4.4%	Hindi	▼4.0%	Hindi	▼3.4%
Spanish	3.2%	Italian	▼3.2%	Italian	▼2.8%	Spanish	▼2.5%	Serbian	▼2.3%
Hindi	3.2%	Spanish	▼3.1%	Spanish	▼2.8%	Serbian	▲2.4%	Spanish	▼2.1%
Religious affiliation, top responses
2001		2006		2011		2016		2021	
Catholic	35.9%	Catholic	▼34.0%	Catholic	▼32.4%	Catholic	▼28.6%	Catholic	▼25.8%
Anglican	15.2%	Anglican	▼12.3%	Anglican	▼10.7%	Islam	▲12.0%	Islam	▲15.1%
Islam	7.5%	Islam	▲8.3%	Islam	▲10.7%	No Religion	▲11.3%	No Religion	▲13.6%
Orthodox	7.2%	Eastern Orthodox	▲7.8%	No Religion	▲7.5%	Not Stated	9.2%	Not Stated	7.2%
No Religion	6.3%	No Religion	▲6.8%	Eastern Orthodox	▼7.5%	Anglican	▼7.4%	Buddhism	▲5.7%

== Council ==
=== Current composition and election method ===
Liverpool City Council is composed of eleven councillors, including the mayor, for a fixed four-year term of office. The mayor is directly elected while the ten other Councillors are elected proportionally as two separate wards, each electing five councillors. The most recent election was held on 14 September 2024, and the makeup of the council, including the mayor, is as follows:

Party	Councillors
Liberal Party	5
Australian Labor Party	4
Liverpool Community Independents Team	1
Our Local Community	1
Total	11

The current Council, elected in 2024, in order of election by ward, is:

Ward	Councillor	Party	Notes
Mayor	Ned Mannoun	Liberal	Elected 2021–present, 2012–2016.
North Ward	Richard Ammoun	Liberal	Elected 2021.
North Ward	Sam Karnib	Labor	Elected 2024.
North Ward	Matthew Harte	Liberal	Elected 2024.
North Ward	Mira Ibrahim	Labor	Elected 2024.
North Ward	Peter Harle	Community Independents	Elected 2008.
South Ward	Fiona Macnaught	Liberal	Elected 2021.
South Ward	Emmanuel Adjei	Liberal	Elected 2024.
South Ward	Ethan Monaghan	Labor	Elected 2024.
South Ward	Peter Ristevski	Our Local Community	Elected 2012–2016 (Liberal), 2024.
South Ward	Zeli Munjiza	Labor	Elected 2026.

== Election results ==
=== 2024 ===
2024 Liverpool City Council election: Ward results
Party	Votes	%	Swing	Seats	Change
Liberal	45,796	41.2	+2.8	4	Steady
Labor	34,772	31.3	−6.8	4	Steady
Our Local Community	9,563	8.6	+8.6	1	▲1
Community Independents	7,529	6.8	−3.1	1	▼1
Libertarian	7,291	6.6	+6.6	0	Steady
Liverpool Independents	3,262	2.9	+2.9	0	Steady
Community Voice	2,055	1.8	+1.8	0	Steady
Independents	708	0.6	−6.2	0	Steady
Formal votes	110,976	87.1			
Informal votes	16,461	12.9			
Total	127,437	100.0		10	
Registered voters / turnout					

=== 2021 ===
2021 New South Wales local elections: Liverpool
Party	Candidate	Votes	%	±%
	Liberal	42,115	38.4	+3.1
	Labor	41,732	38.1	−2.6
	Community Independents	10,803	9.9	−4.5
	Independent	7,504	6.8	+2.8
	Greens	7,379	6.7	+1.1

== History ==
It is one of the oldest urban settlements in Australia, founded in 1810 as an agricultural centre by Governor Lachlan Macquarie. He named it after Robert Banks Jenkinson, Earl of Liverpool, who was then the secretary of state for the Colonies and the British city of Liverpool upon which some of the city's architecture is based.

=== Municipal history ===
On 19 September 1843, the Liverpool District Council was established by charter, with Captain Samuel Moore as its first magistrate and warden, and Thomas Valentine Blomfield, Thomas Harper, David Johnston, Joshua John Moore, Richard Sadlier and Edward Weston as councillors. Its area also included most of Sutherland Shire. The new form of government was not popular and fizzled out by 1850.

After 148 local residents lodged a petition with the governor on 4 September 1871, the Municipality of Liverpool was proclaimed on 27 June 1872. At its first election on 27 August 1872, Richard Sadleir was elected Mayor.

On 1 January 1949, the Municipality absorbed Riding B of the abolished Nepean Shire.

On 9 December 1960, the Municipality was proclaimed by Governor Eric Woodward as the City of Liverpool.

=== Regional history ===
Liverpool is at the head of navigation of the Georges River and combined with the Great Southern Railway from Sydney to Melbourne reaching Liverpool in the late 1850s, Liverpool became a major agricultural and transportation centre as the land in the district was very productive. A large army base was established in Liverpool during World War I, and exists to this day as the Holsworthy Barracks. There are a number of other military establishments in neighbouring Moorebank.

Until the 1950s, Liverpool was still a satellite town with an agricultural economy based on poultry farming and market gardening. However the tidal surge of urban sprawl which engulfed the rich flatlands west of Sydney known as the Cumberland Plain soon reached Liverpool, and it became an outer suburb of metropolitan Sydney with a strong working-class presence and manufacturing facilities. Liverpool also became renowned for its vast Housing Commission estates housing thousands of low-income families after the slum clearance and urban renewal programs in inner-city Sydney in the 1960s.

The City of Liverpool is home to one of the largest municipal libraries in Sydney.

Freedom of Entry

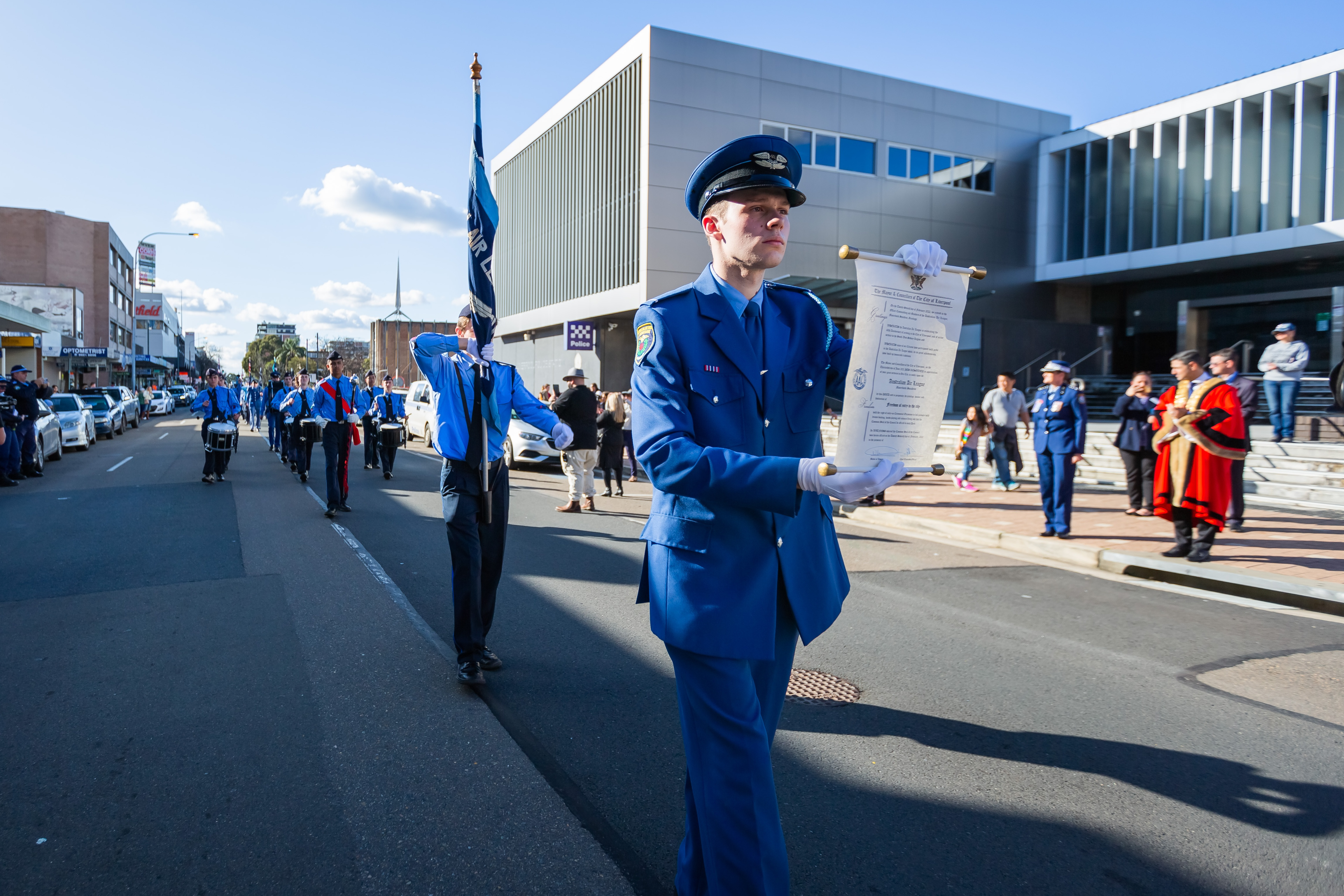
Moorebank Squadron marching past Liverpool Court House following the formal challenge from NSW Police Chief Inspector Allyson Fenwick

The City of Liverpool has bestowed Freedom of Entry just three times in its 150 years of local government. The Australian Army's Royal Australian Engineers were granted Freedom of Entry in 1959 and re-affirmed in 2018 as part of Liverpool's Centenary of Armistice commemoration. The Australian Air League's Moorebank Squadron were granted Freedom of Entry in 2022 marking 60 years in the Liverpool community and included a formation flypast over Bigge Park

The 2018 and 2022 occasions both occasions featured a parade through the Liverpool Town Centre, a formal challenge outside Liverpool Court House, and community activities at Bigge Park. Since opening in January 2018, the five-star William Inglis Hotel in Warwick Farm has become a notable tourism and accommodation destination within the Liverpool local government area.

== Waste services ==
The contents of the red-lid bins are disposed of at the Lucas Heights Landfill, which is owned and operated by Cleanaway. The co-mingled recyclables from the yellow-lid bins are sent to Visy in Smithfield for processing, while the contents of the green-lid bins, consisting of garden and food organics, are sent to Australian Native Landscapes (ANL) in Kemps Creek.

== See also ==
- List of local government areas in New South Wales
- Local government areas of New South Wales
