= Hoxton Park =

- Suburb
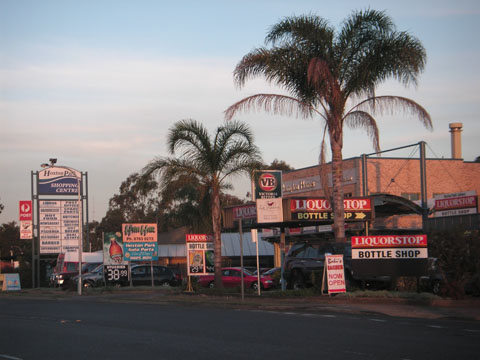
- Hoxton Park Shopping Centre in 2009

- Interactive map of Hoxton Park
- Country: Australia
- State: New South Wales
- City: Sydney
- LGA: City of Liverpool
- Location: 38 km (24 mi) west of Sydney CBD

Government
  - State electorates: Leppington; Liverpool
  - Federal division: Werriwa
- Elevation: 41 m (135 ft)

Population
  - Total: 4,572 (2021 census)
- Postcode: 2171
Suburbs around Hoxton Park
Middleton Grange	Hinchinbrook	Miller
West Hoxton	Hoxton Park	Prestons
West Hoxton	Horningsea Park	Prestons

Hoxton Park is a suburb of Sydney, in the state of New South Wales, Australia. Hoxton Park is located 38 kilometres west of the Sydney central business district, in the local government area of the City of Liverpool and is part of the Greater Western Sydney region.

Hoxton Park also had a small sealed airstrip, Hoxton Park Airport which was used for general aviation and training until its closure and destruction in 2008.

== History ==
Hoxton Park was named in 1887 when Phillips and Co. syndicates, subdivided the land under that name. Thomas Setrop Amos, a London solicitor, who arrived in Sydney in 1816, was granted 800 acres (3.2 km^{2}) here in June 1818.

A further development of note took place circa 1857 with the construction of Bernera, a weatherboard homestead built by Allan Macpherson, son of a former Collector of Internal Revenue, William Macpherson. Bernera was an early homestead in a vernacular style and is listed on the Register of the National Estate.

== Population ==
In 2021, there were 4,572 residents in Hoxton Park. The median age of people in Hoxton Park was 35 years. Children aged 0 – 14 years made up 22.1% of the population and people aged 65 years and over made up 10.1% of the population. The most common ancestries were Australian 12.2%, English 10.0%, Indian 7.5%, Italian 5.9% and Chinese 5.7%. 49.2% of people were born in Australia. The most common other countries of birth were Iraq 8.6%, Fiji 6.2%, Vietnam 3.3%, Philippines 2.8% and New Zealand 2.0%. 35.8% of people only spoke English at home. Other languages spoken at home included Arabic 10.9%, Hindi 7.1%, Vietnamese 4.7%, Assyrian Neo-Aramaic 4.1% and Spanish 2.7%. The most common responses for religion in Hoxton were Catholic 30.4%, Islam 12.4%, No Religion 11.4%, Buddhism 7.9% and Hinduism 6.6%.

== Transport ==
Hoxton Park sits at the corner of Hoxton Park Road and Cowpasture Road which connect to the Westlink M7 and much of greater Sydney. Transit Systems provides two bus routes 853 and 854 running along both Hoxton Park Road and Cowpasture Road, connecting Hoxton Park to Liverpool and areas west thereof.

== Churches ==
Hoxton Park has many churches including Inspire Church, which has been active for more than 25 years with more than 5,000 members, Hoxton Park Anglican Church which began in 1992 and also Bible Baptist Church which started in 1992.

Other churches in Hoxton Park include Good Shepherd Catholic Church, Hoxton Park Seventh-day Adventist Church, and Hoxton Park Union Church.

== Sport and recreation ==
Hoxton Park is home to the Liverpool Catholic Club which has an ice skating complex nearby.

== See also ==
- Hoxton Park Airport
