= Sydney Science Park =

Development in New South Wales, Australia

- Location: Luddenham, Sydney, New South Wales, Australia
- Owner: Celestino
- Key people: Matthew Scard, CEO
- Established: October 2016
- Status: Under construction
- Website: celestino.net.au/project/sydney-science-park/

Sydney Science Park is a mixed-use area for research, STEM (science, technology, engineering and mathematics) and residential developments due to be constructed by Celestino. The architectural firms Urbis and FJMT Architects are working in conjunction with the designers at Celestino. The project is billed to become "Penrith's answer to Silicon Valley". On completion, the park will comprise a total area of 280 hectares.

It is being constructed near the new Western Sydney Airport.

== History ==
Celestino bought the land in 2010 for $40 million. In 2013 the NSW department of planning stated that the development would be "out-of-step" with public priorities but later stated that essential services such as connections to utilities should come at "no cost to government".

The project received initial planning approval from the state government in 2016 after being advanced from its initial stages in 2015.

In August 2018, a sod turning ceremony occurred involving the state minister for western Sydney Stuart Ayres, federal minister for urban infrastructure and cities Paul Fletcher and the state MP for Mulgoa Tanya Davies occurred in the proposed site. At this time, the project was reported as being on track to open in 2021. It was also reported that the project will utilise renewable energy technologies and include high-speed computer networking options. The CSIRO (commonwealth scientific and industrial research organisation) was reported to have reserved a space to develop an Urban Living Lab in the proposed area. The Catholic Education Diocese of Parramatta also signed on to build the city's first STEM high school.

In 2022, it was reported that some residents had moved in but did not have water or sewerage connections. Member of the Legislative Council Mark Latham had concerns over a deal signed in 2020 between Sydney Water and a developer in charge of the project, describing it as a "gift from the state government to the developer". In January 2022, Sydney Water paid a contractor $25 million to build a wastewater facility in the park with additional services to begin in 2024. Celestino CEO Matthew Scard said that his organisation is "unable to forecast" when building works may begin. The park promises 12,000 jobs. The amount of new houses to be created is capped at 3,400. More than 80 hectares of open space will be created as a result of this development.

In February 2025, it was reported that Celestino was in the process of applying for a secretary's environmental assessment requirements that would lead to the organisation being granted state significant development status.

In September 2025, the Sydney Morning Herald reported that the project had not progressed very far since its original approval in 2016 and initial sod-turnings in 2018 and 2021, despite it being connected in the future to a nearby metro station being built in Luddenham as part of the Sydney Metro Western Sydney Airport line. A parliamentary inquiry took place but could not provide clear answers relating to the circumstances surrounding this project.
