= Western Sydney Airport =

Airport in Badgerys Creek, New South Wales, Australia

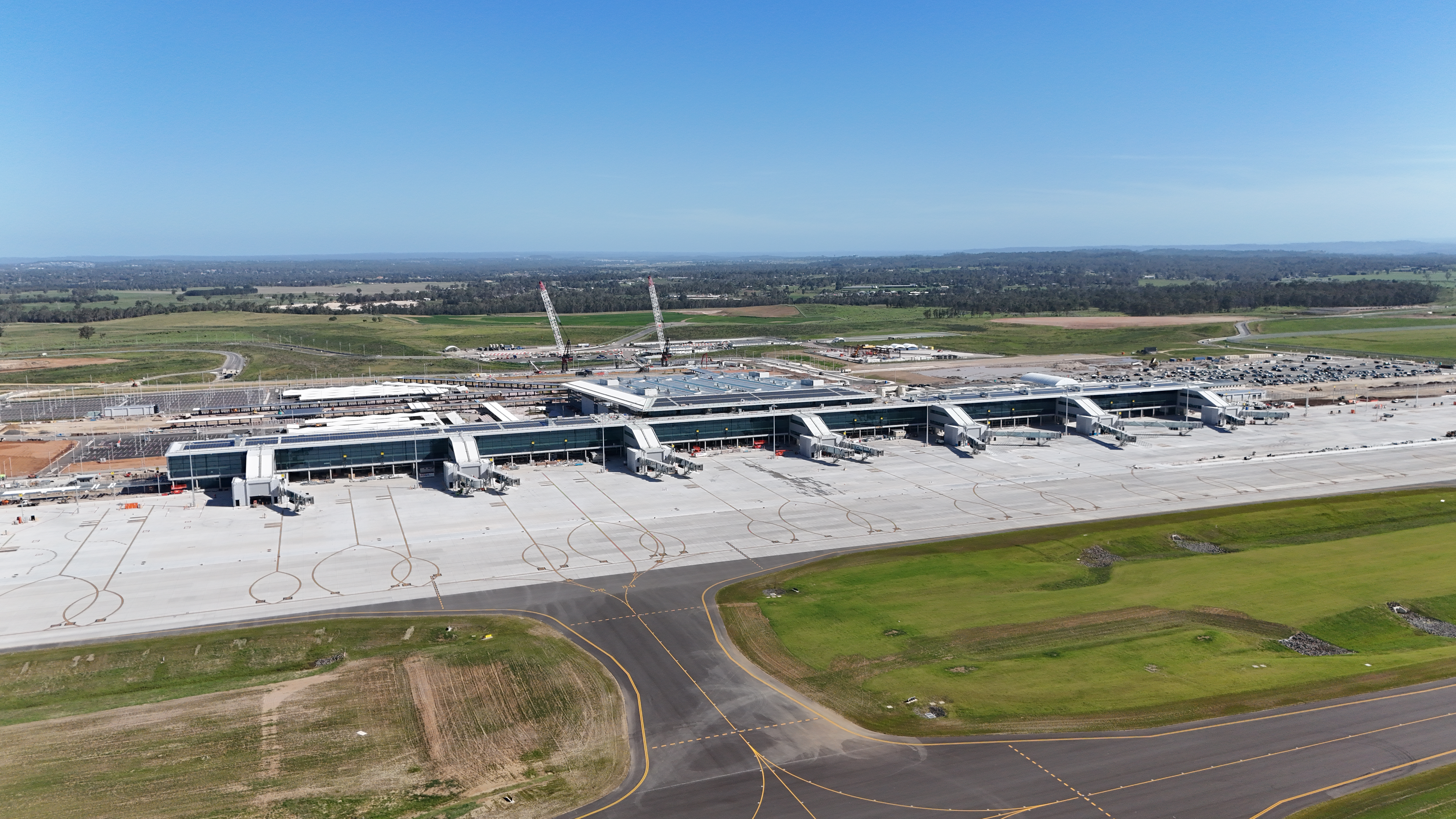
- Aerial view of main terminal building under construction, January 2025
- IATA: WSI; ICAO: YSWS

Summary
- Airport type: Public
- Owner: Australian Government
- Operator: WSA Co Limited
- Serves: Greater Sydney, Blue Mountains
- Location: Luddenham and Badgerys Creek, New South Wales, Australia
- Opened: 27 July 2026; 3 months ago (cargo flights); 25 October 2026; 28 days ago (passenger flights)
- Elevation AMSL: 80 m (260 ft)
- Coordinates: 33°53′17″S 150°42′53″E
- Website: www.wsiairport.com.au

Maps
- Stage 1 Airport Facilities

- Location within New South Wales (top) and Greater Sydney (bottom) WSI/YSWS (Sydney)
- Interactive map of Western Sydney Airport

Runways
Direction	Length		Surface
Direction	m	ft	Surface
05/23	3,700	12,139	Asphalt

Western Sydney Airport (IATA: WSI, ICAO: YSWS), officially Western Sydney International (Nancy-Bird Walton) Airport — is an international airport in Luddenham and Badgerys Creek in New South Wales, Australia, approximately 44 km (27 mi) west of the Sydney central business district. Together with the development of surrounding areas, it is a key part of the Western Sydney Aerotropolis plan.

The airport commenced its first commercial cargo flights on 26 July 2026, and passenger operations began on 25 October 2026. Operated by WSA Co Limited, which is wholly owned by the Australian Government, the airport offers 24-hour, curfew-free operations and supplements Sydney Airport, which has reached capacity due to a legislated curfew and flight caps. It is the first major airport in Australia to not have an air traffic control tower on site.

The site of the airport was officially designated by the federal government on 15 April 2014, after decades of debate on the location of another airport within Greater Sydney. The airport will be constructed in stages. Stage 1 consists of a single 3.7 km (2.3 mi) runway and a single integrated international and domestic terminal, which is expected to handle up to 10 million annual passengers. Construction of Stage 1 began on 24 September 2018, and major construction was completed in June 2025. Future stages of the airport are expected to begin after Stage 1, and will include an expanded or additional terminal and a second parallel runway. This will allow the airport to handle approximately 82 million annual passengers.

== History ==
Operating since 1919, Sydney Airport is one of the world's oldest airports. Located only 8 km (5 mi) from the city centre, the airport site is now hemmed in on three sides by urban growth and on the fourth side by Botany Bay. This makes expansion prohibitively expensive, as it would require either land reclamation or expropriation and demolition of urban areas. There have thus been various proposals to build a second airport for Sydney since the 1960s.

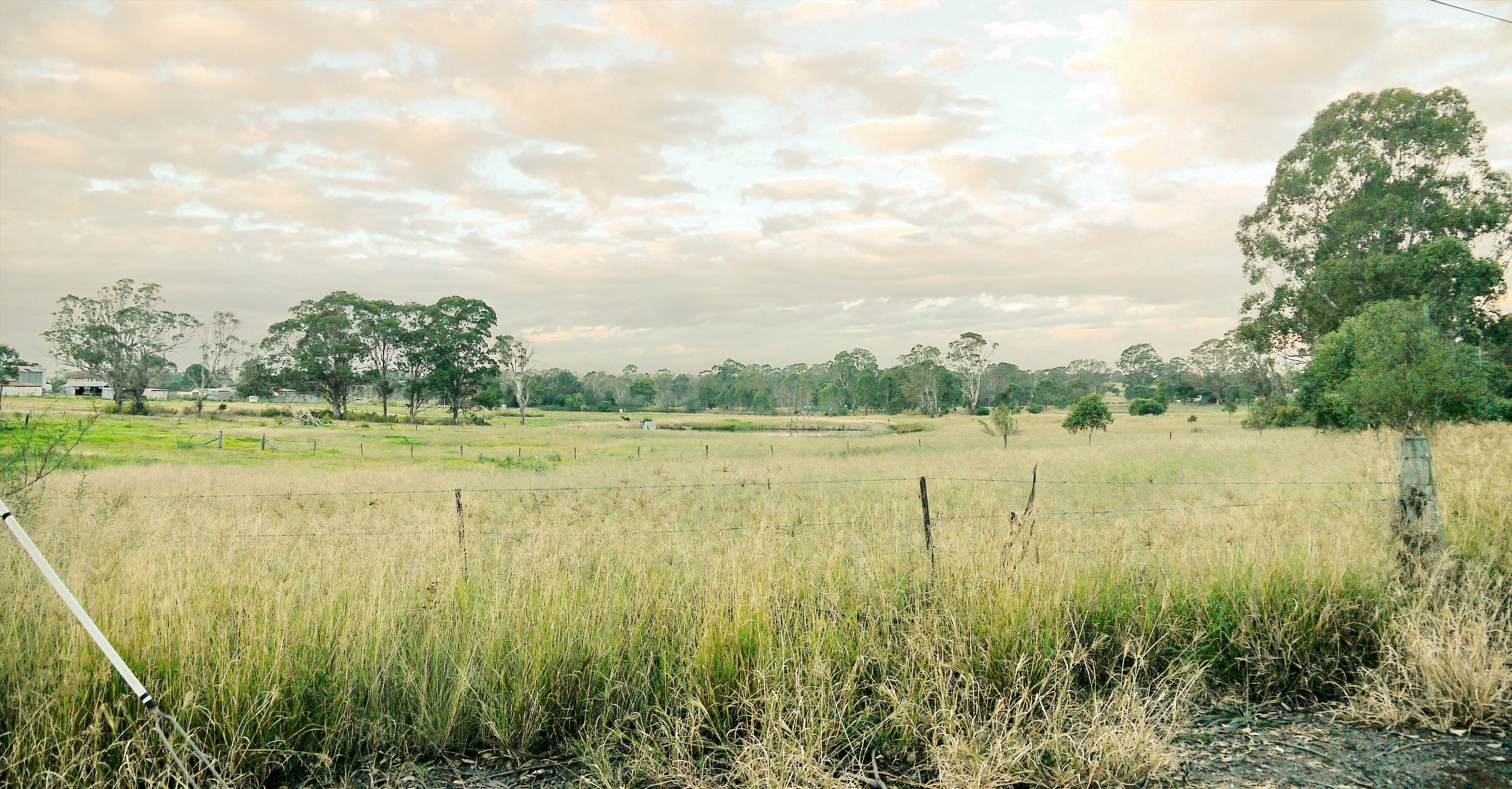
A portion of the then-undeveloped site of the airport, 2014

The federal government announced in February 1986 that Badgerys Creek had been chosen as the location for a second major airport for Sydney. The government then undertook a series of land acquisitions for the site, primarily during the period 1986 to 1991, and spent approximately A$170 million. The resulting site totalled 1,780 hectares (4,400 acres).

However, following the purchase, the government decided that construction of a third runway at Sydney Airport was more appropriate, and all work on the site was halted.

Despite the expansion, concerns remained that Sydney Airport would run out of capacity by 2030, especially since the introduction of strict night flying restrictions in 1995. Planning for a second airport thus began again in earnest in 2008. A 3,200-page joint Federal/NSW study released in 2012 concluded that Badgerys Creek was "clearly the best site for a much-needed second airport for Sydney" and recommended that planning should start. On 15 April 2014, the federal government announced that Badgerys Creek would be the site of the Second Sydney Airport. In September 2018, construction works began at the Badgerys Creek Airport site.

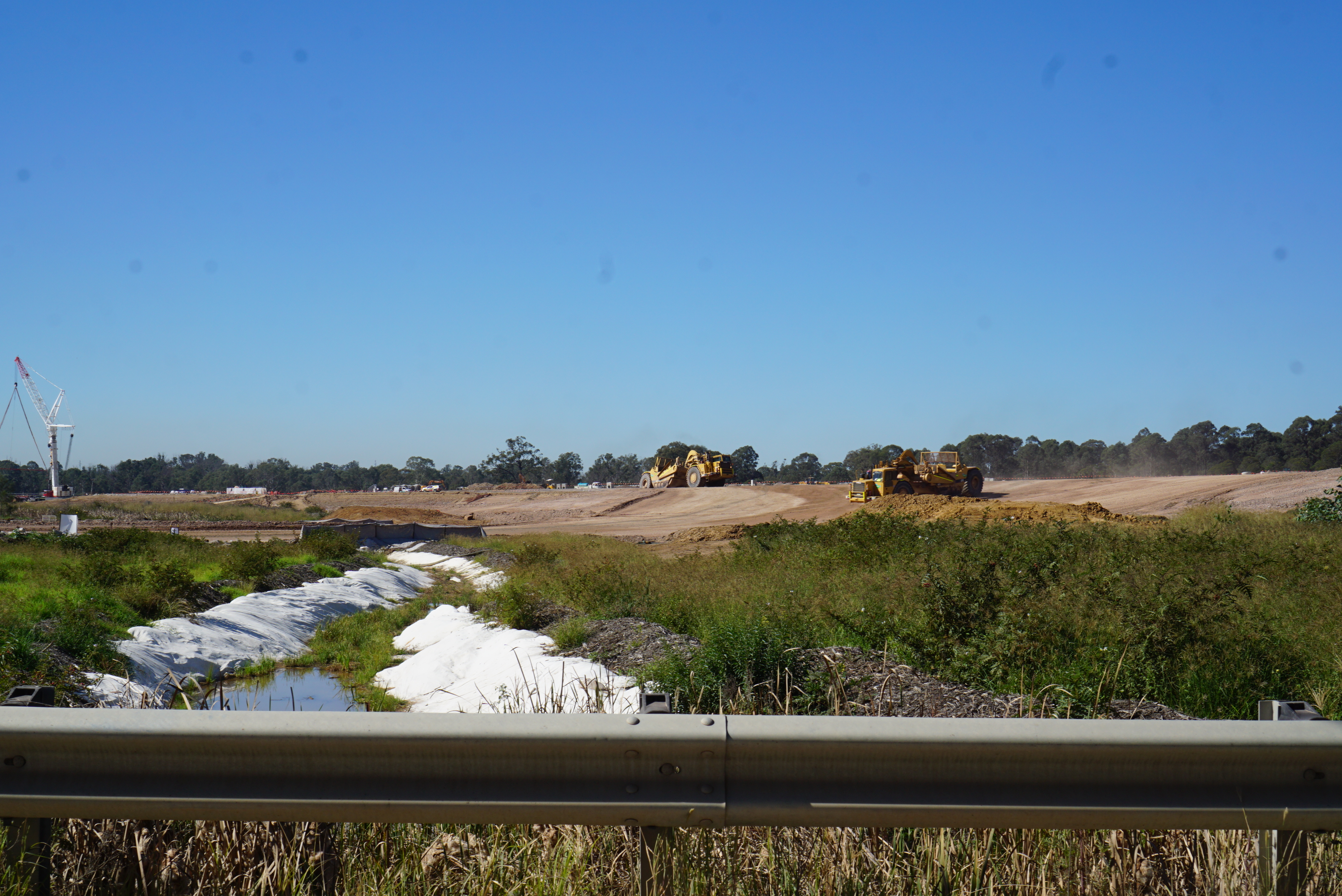
Early site-works in May 2019

On 4 March 2019, the federal government announced that the airport would be named Nancy Bird Walton International Airport in honour of the Australian aviator Nancy Bird Walton. New South Wales premier Gladys Berejiklian stated that the naming is an "absolutely inspiring choice" as the name for the new airport. Prime minister Scott Morrison stated that "we now recognise Australia's greatest female aviation pioneer" in the naming of the airport, and members of Walton's family stated that they were "extremely excited and thrilled, and it's just a huge honour" for their mother and grandmother.

On 10 December 2020, a light aircraft made an emergency landing on earthworks at the construction site, which was the airport's first arrival. The first official arrival at the airport took place on 2 October 2024, being a Piper PA-30 Twin Comanche registered as VH-8MN.

In July 2025, WSA Co proposed to have the airport precinct designated as a separate suburb known as Cabrogal, named after the Cabrogal people of the Dharug nation based in the Cumberland Plain area.

The airport opened for regular freight services on 27 July 2026, with initial operators Qantas Freight, Texel Air and Team Global Express. Regularly scheduled passenger services commenced on 25 October 2026, with Jetstar flight JQ362 becoming the first domestic flight to depart the airport at 11 am to the Gold Coast. Air New Zealand commenced the first international services to the airport from Auckland on 26 October 2026.

== Facilities ==
=== Runway ===
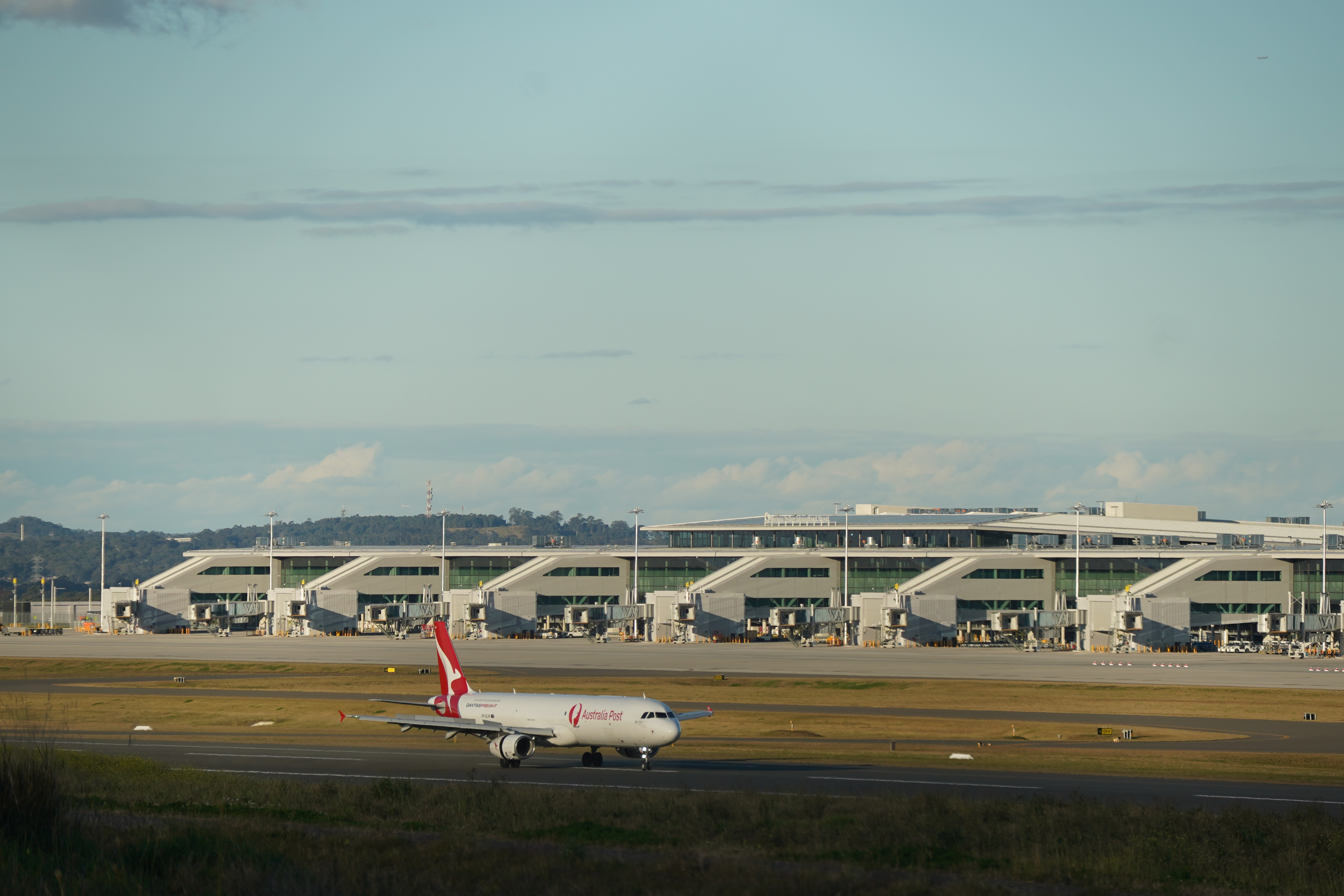
Airbus A321 passes the WSI passenger terminal.

Seating area near gate lounges within the terminal

Airside concourse at the passenger terminal

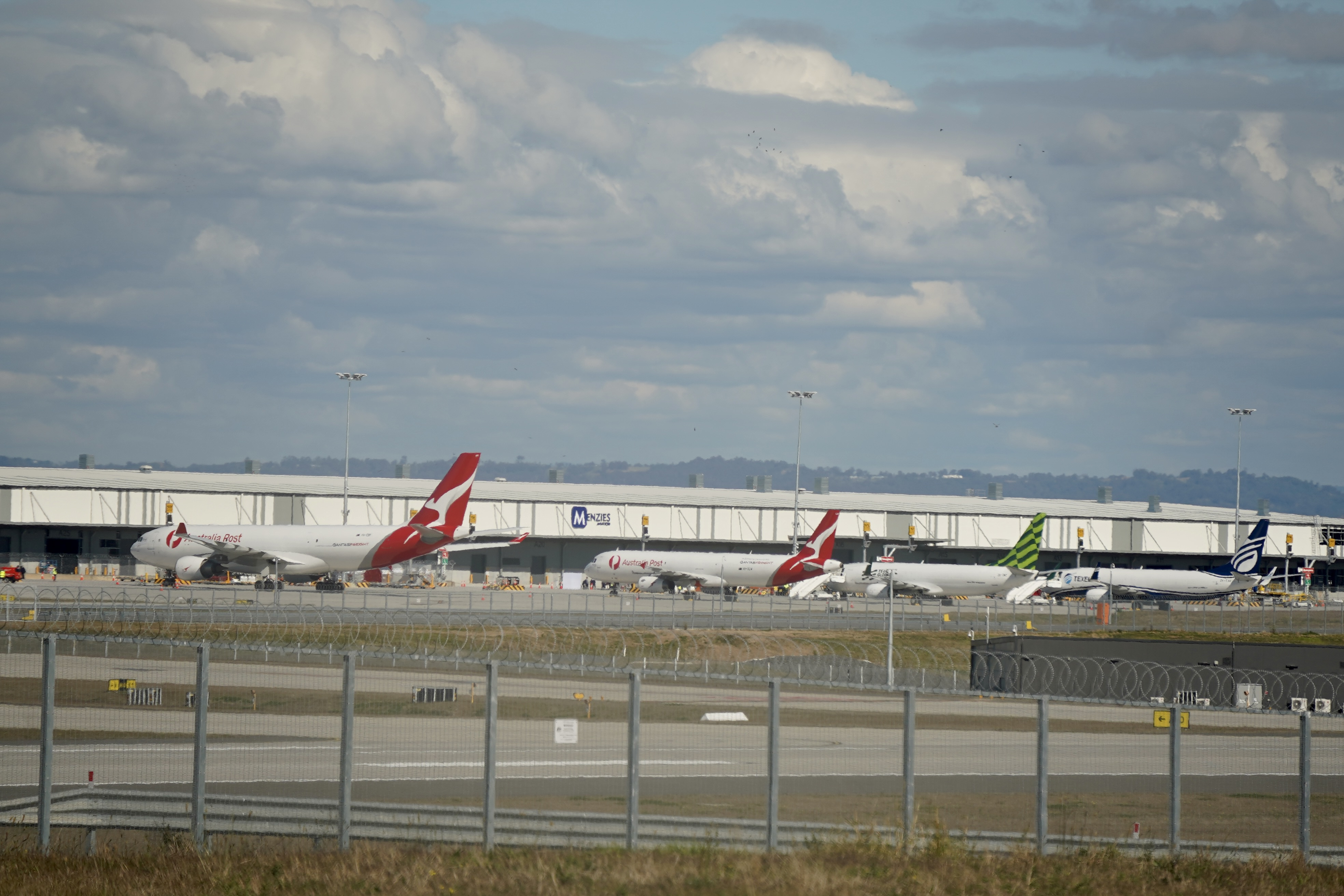
Western Sydney Airport cargo terminal

Runway 05/23 is the main and only runway of the airport, running northeast-southwest with a paved length of 3,700 m (12,139 ft) and Code F categorisation, capable of handling the largest aircraft such as Boeing 747 and Airbus A380. Reciprocal runway operations (taking off and landing from the same direction) are preferred to/from the southwest to minimise noise.

=== Digital remote air traffic control tower ===
The airport is the first in Australia to open without a traditional control tower, instead equipped with a remote digital air traffic control tower. The remote tower consists of 20 cameras located atop a 45-metre (148 ft) mast, streaming video back to controllers located in a data centre 20 km (12 mi) away at Eastern Creek. The quality and safety of the tower has been criticised by the Sydney Morning Herald.

=== Passenger terminal ===
The airport's domestic and international passenger terminals are combined under one roof, featuring 14 gates with 13 aerobridges and 6 remote stands. Several gates are deployable as 'swing gates', able to be set for either domestic or international flights. The gates are capable of handling all sizes of passenger aircraft including the Airbus A380. The arrivals hall features 40 self service check in kiosks and 34 bag drop kiosks, designed to reduce queuing and wait times as they can be used by any passenger with any airline. The 5 km (3 mi) long automated baggage handling system moves at 2 metres per second (6.6 ft/s) and can process 2,000 bags per hour. The terminals design draws inspiration from the surrounding bush landscape and Aboriginal Dharug country, such as extensive use of sandstone.

==== Terminal facilities ====
Passenger amenities at the WSI terminal include drinking water stations, flight information displays, play areas and smoking areas. The airport also has free Wi-Fi that can be accessed from anywhere within the airport. Accessibility facilities include accessible parking, accessible lifts, hearing loops, Braille, toilets and family-friendly changing rooms. Around the terminal, there are also multi-faith prayer rooms, pet relief facilities and access control gates. However, although there is accessible seating at boarding gates, test customers have revealed that seating in general throughout the airport remains limited. The terminal also includes a shopping and dining options available on a 24-hour basis. The airport's main duty-free is opoerated by Lagardère AWPL. Some shops available at the domestic shopping precinct include Eyelove for eyewear shopping and technology accessories at Tech2Go.

===== Food and beverage =====
- Mountain Culture: brewery. This is a Blue Mountains based brewery, which will be operating two venues at the terminal. The venues were developed in partnership with Airport Retail Group Australia, and features Western Sydney local drinks and culture.
- RELAY: convenience store. Relay is operated by Lagardère Travel Retail, and features books and press, such as newspapers and magazines, grab-and-go food and drinks, travel accessories, health and beauty and souvenirs.

=== Cargo precinct ===
The airport's 75,000 m^{2} (810,000 sq ft) cargo precinct includes airfreight terminals operated by Qantas Freight and Menzies Aviation, with stands capable of holding up to eight wide body aircraft at once designed to handle heavy cargo, e-commerce and time sensitive freight such as pharmaceuticals and perishable food products. The terminals have an initial capacity to move over 220,000 tonnes of cargo per year. Plans to expand the precinct include a 5,000 m^{2} (54,000 sq ft) cargo facility operated by dnata.

== Geography ==
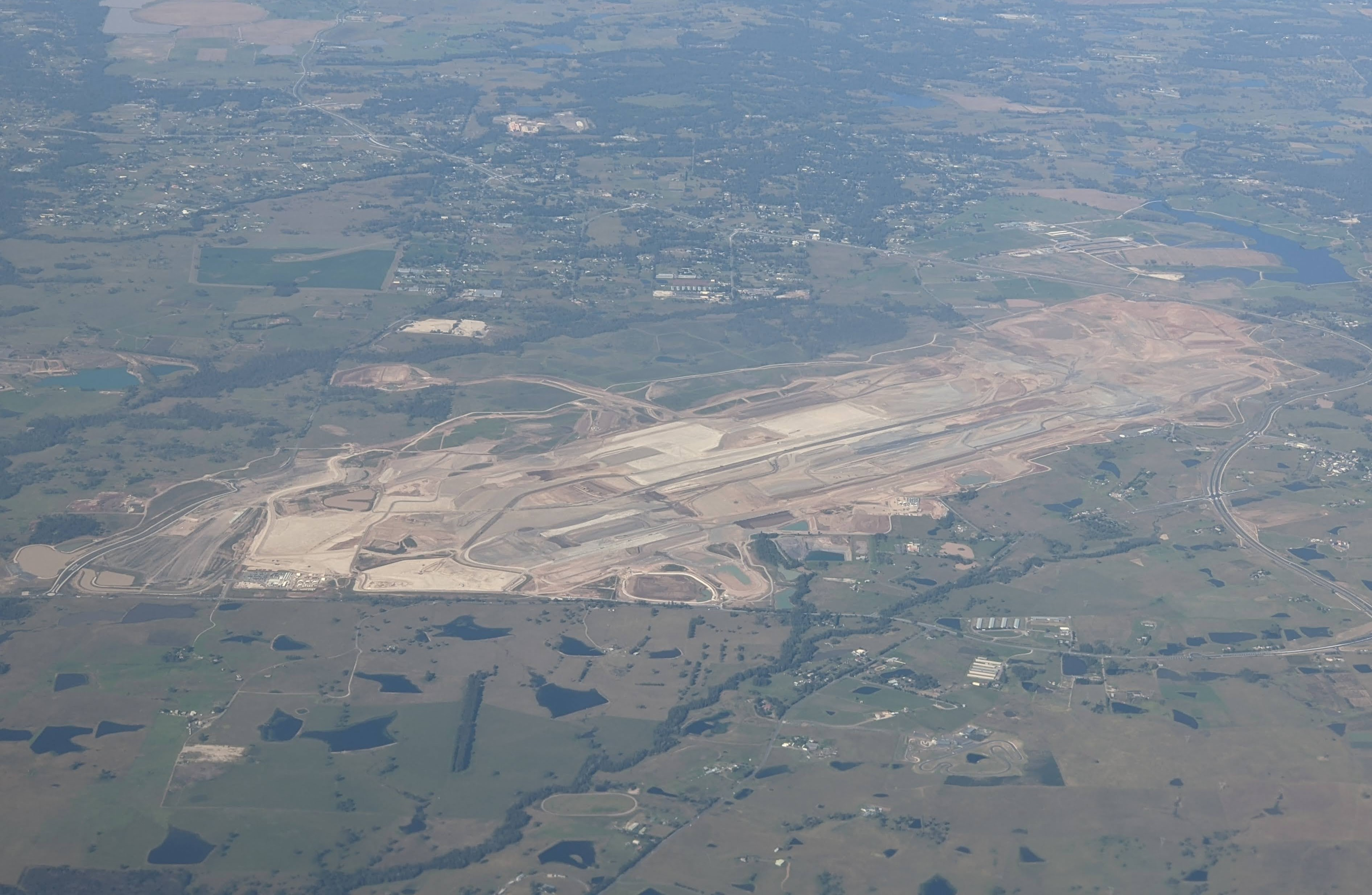
Aerial view (facing south) of the airport under construction and its surrounding area, 2021

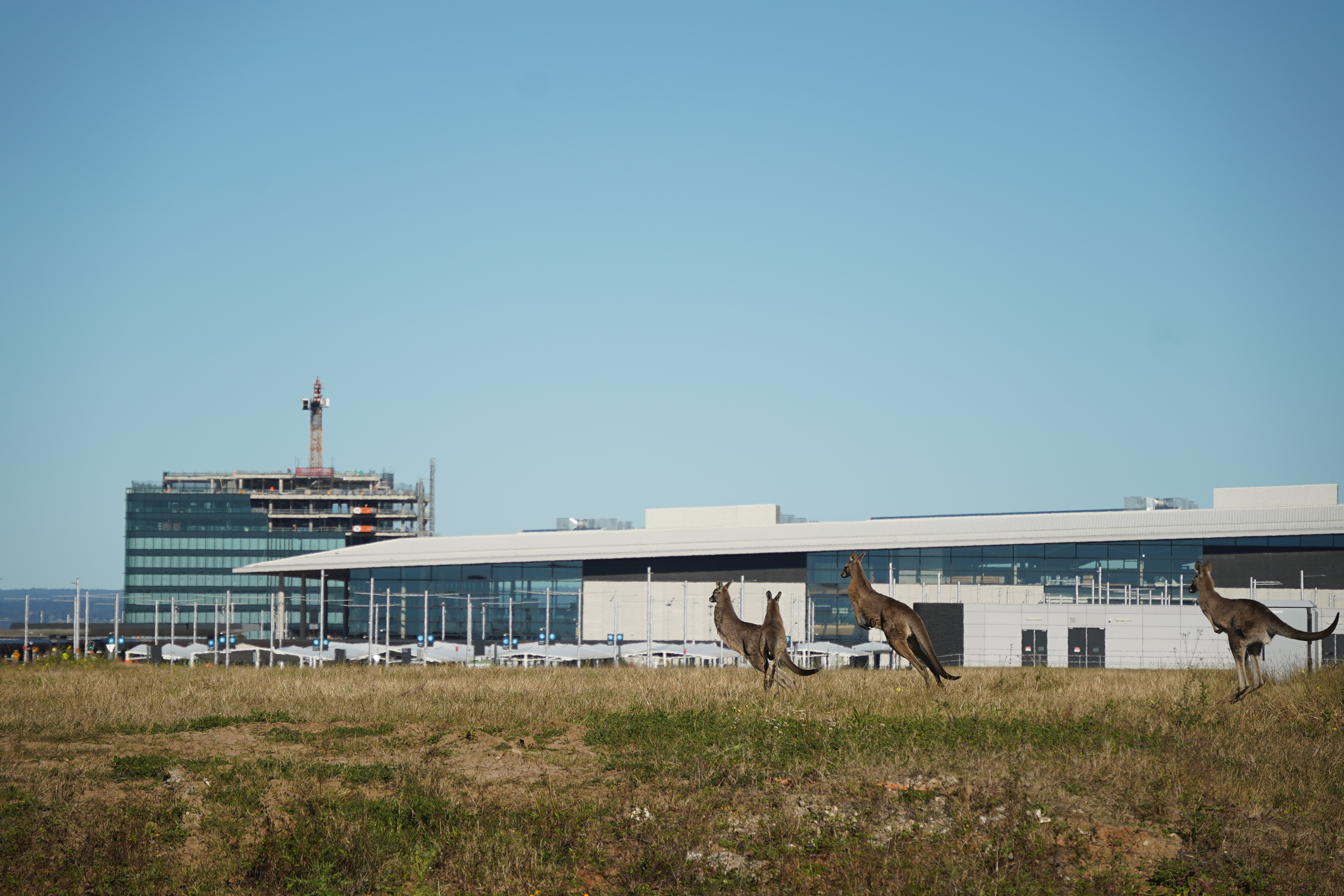
Kangaroos hop past the Western Sydney Airport Terminal.

The airport is situated 44 km (27 mi) west of the Sydney CBD and 41 km (25 mi) west of Sydney Airport. The site lies 13 km (8 mi) south of the City of Penrith CBD and approximately 20 km (12 mi) north of the City of Campbelltown CBD. The Township of Luddenham is located adjacent to the airport, 1 km (0.62 mi) from the runway. The airport stands within 7 km (4.3 mi) of the World Heritage-listed Blue Mountains National Park, sparking serious concerns about declared wilderness, wild rivers, amenities, World Heritage status, and the City of Blue Mountains economy. The site is within the City of Liverpool local government area and consists of approximately 1,700 hectares (4,200 acres) of Commonwealth land that was acquired between 1986 and 1991.

In November 2026, concerns were raised that the airport may exacerbate urban heat in surrounding areas. Professor Sebastian Pfautsch of Western Sydney University argued that the airport's extensive paved surfaces could act as a heat sink, absorbing and re-radiating heat, potentially increasing temperatures in nearby suburbs and reducing the cooling effect of southerly winds towards Penrith, St Marys and Emu Plains.

== Legislation ==
The Airports Act 1996 (Cth) s 6 enables the development and use of an airport, known as Sydney West Airport. The Airport Plan released by the Commonwealth Government in December 2016 notes that the airport is referred to in the Act as Sydney West Airport is commonly known as Western Sydney Airport.

== Economy ==
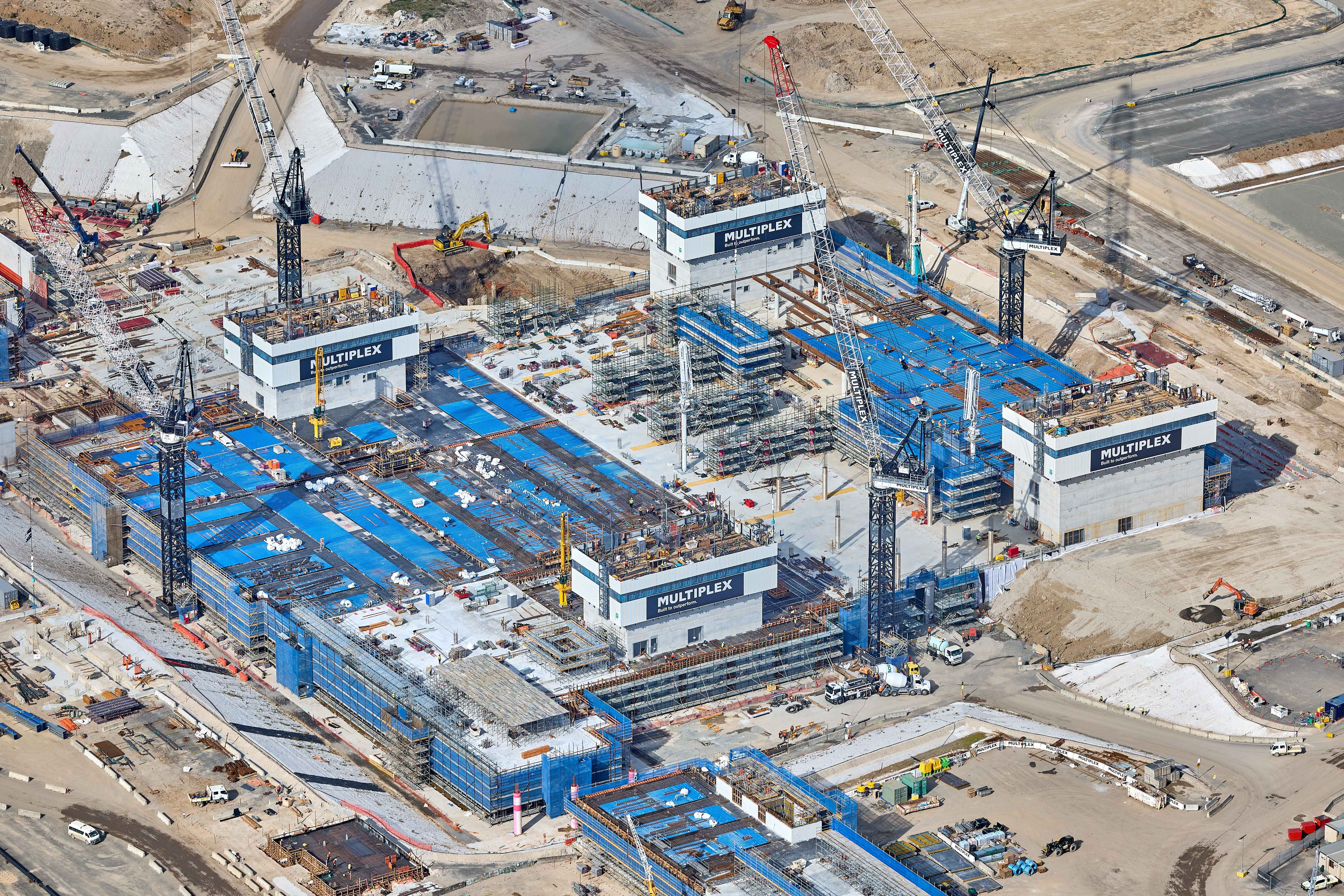
Construction of the terminal in September 2022

The Federal Government claimed the initial construction phase is expected to generate around 4,000 jobs, and the airport development is expected to create 35,000 jobs by 2035, increasing to 60,000 jobs over time. Prime Minister Scott Morrison claimed that the airport would "create 11,000 jobs during construction" and "28,000 within its first 5 years". However, such claims were contradicted by the 2017 labour market analysis commissioned by the Government. The analysis states that the airport is predicted to directly support 3,231 jobs during construction over eight years, 13,169 from the airport combined with a business park during the first five years of operation, and 24,046 from the combined airport and business park over the following ten years.

Western Sydney Airport will be the linchpin of Aerotropolis Western Sydney, a rezoning and development plan to be applied to the lands around the airport. This includes the development of what was formerly known as the Western Parkland City, which in 2023 was gazetted as the new city of Bradfield. The development aims to become a high-skilled jobs hub for the aerospace, defense, manufacturing, health care, freight, agribusiness, education and research sectors.

== Flight paths ==
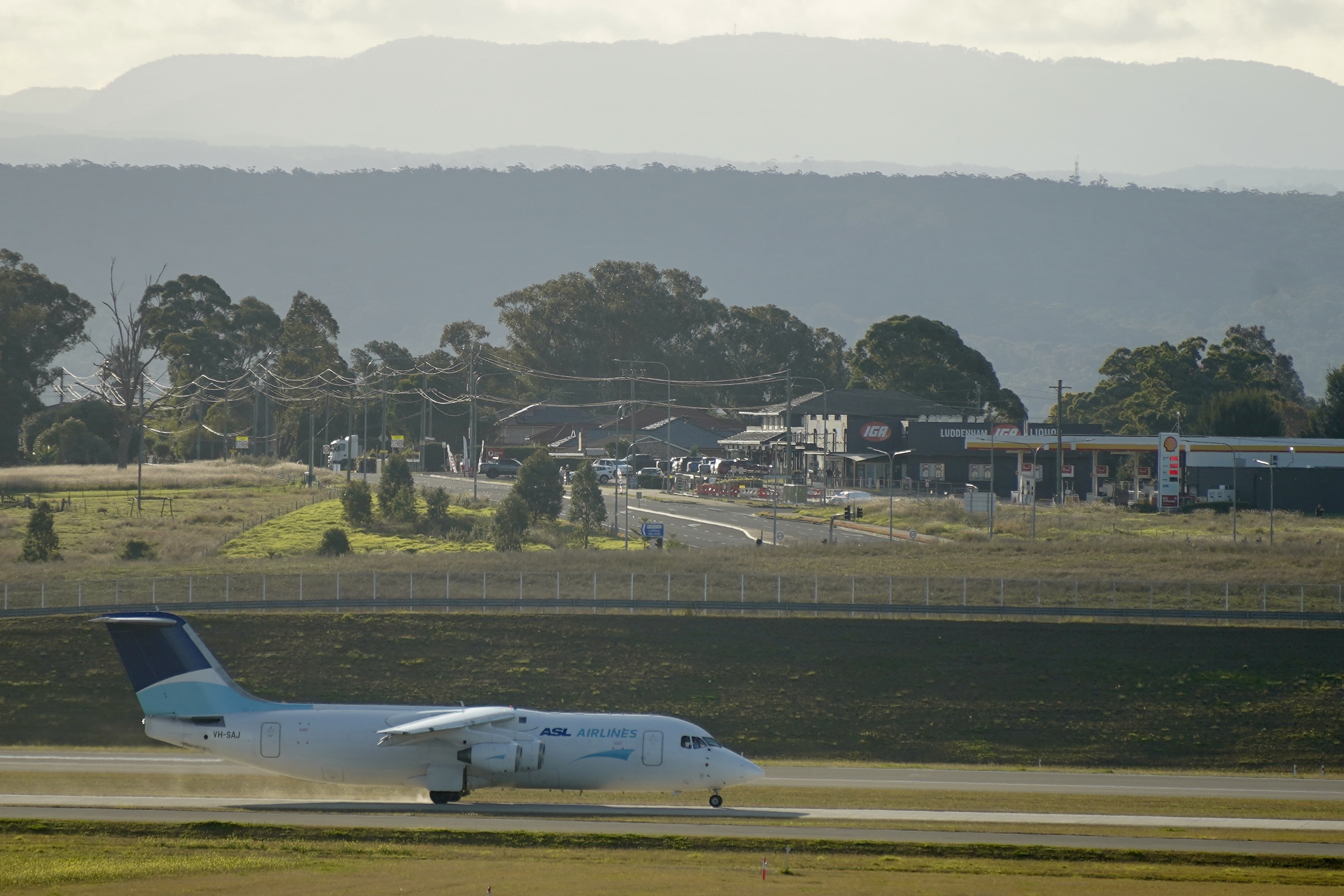
BAe-146 taxis past Luddenham Village at the Western Sydney Airport.

On 19 October 2015, the draft environmental impact statement (EIS) was released by the Turnbull government. This statement outlined the proposed flight paths for Western Sydney Airport from the initial opening in the mid-2020s and flight paths for an international expansion. The draft EIS showed incoming flights merging approximately 1,500 m (4,921 ft) over the Blue Mountains town of Blaxland which already lies at an altitude of 234 m (768 ft). Unlike Sydney airport, no 'flight sharing' was proposed to reduce noise impacts on individual suburbs. Instead, flight paths followed a single loop turning either southwest or continuing southeast after the Blaxland merge point, then either northeast or southwest towards Badgerys Creek. The height started at 1,266 m (4,154 ft) above ground level over Blaxland, with the southwest path descending over the World Heritage-listed national park, declared wilderness, declared wild rivers, and Warragamba Dam, until reaching 457 m (1,499 ft), over the township of Warragamba and descending towards the airport over Wallacia, Greendale, Silverdale and Luddenham before landing. The southeast path descended over Glenbrook, Lapstone, Emu Plains, Penrith, and St Marys, reaching 457 m (1,499 ft) over Erskine Park then 381 m (1,250 ft) over the Twin Creeks and Sydney Science Park housing estates before landing. Assessment of noise impacts was based solely on these flight paths.

After an extensive community backlash and as a measure to retain her seat of Macquarie, Liberal Louise Markus and the Coalition government announced a scrapping of the Blaxland merge point. The final EIS, released on 15 September 2016, revealed that the flight paths, although remaining the same, were marked as 'indicative only'. A consistent message portrayed to the public since then is that the flight paths are unknown, will not be released, noise impacts will not be assessed, nor community consultation undertaken until after construction of the airport. Markus lost her seat at that election, with a swing against her of 9.2 percent.

In June 2023, the proposed flight paths were released with an interactive online map displaying the predicted noise impacts. Noise insulation grants will be available for some residents.

On 9 July 2026, the updated airspace changes around the Sydney Basin to support the operation of Western Sydney Airport came into effect.

The Sydney Airport Curfew Act 1995 specifies that the exemption that allows BAe-146 freight aircraft to operate at Sydney Airport during its curfew period will cease when Western Sydney Airport is able to be used for night aircraft movements.

== Construction ==
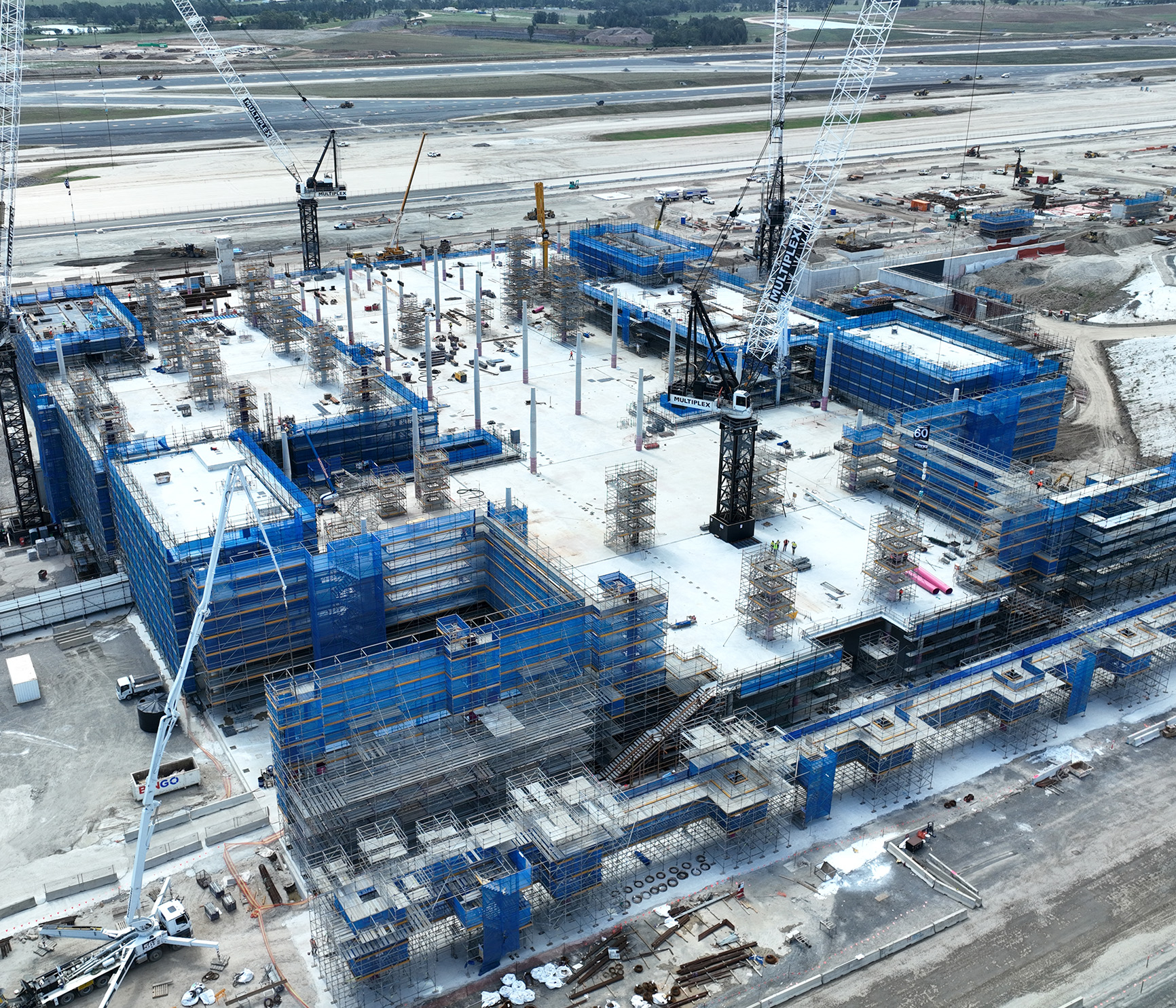
Aerial view of the airport terminal under construction as of March 2023

The airport is being built in phases, with the initial construction phase building a smaller airport with a single runway. The cost of the initial development was estimated at A$2.4 billion (as of 2012) and would generate 4,000 jobs. The government planned that the initial phase would be complete and operational by 2025, though this was later delayed to 2026.

Sydney Airport Corporation, the operator of Sydney Airport, was given the right of first refusal to build and operate any second airport in an agreement reached with the government when Sydney Airport was sold in 2002. Sydney Airport declined the offer to build and operate the airport on 2 May 2017.

Construction of Stage 1 include:

- a single 3.7 km (2.3 mi) runway (05/23, to be 05L/23R in the future)
- terminal aprons, taxiways, and other appropriate aviation facilities
- a terminal with a floor area of up to 90,000 m^{2} (970,000 sq ft)
- car-parking facilities for around 11,500 cars, and
- on-site roads and utilities
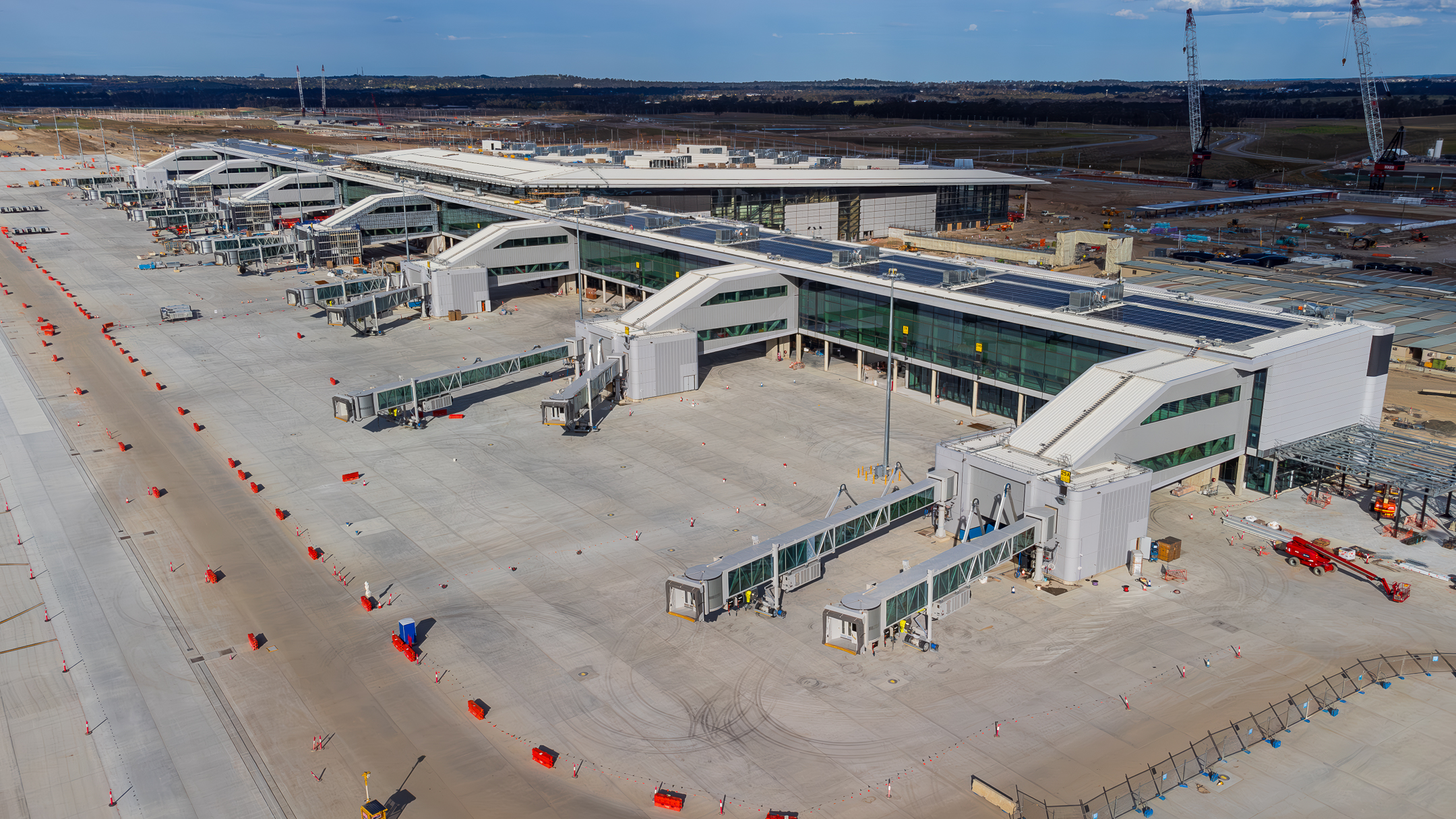
The main terminal building nearing completion in October 2024

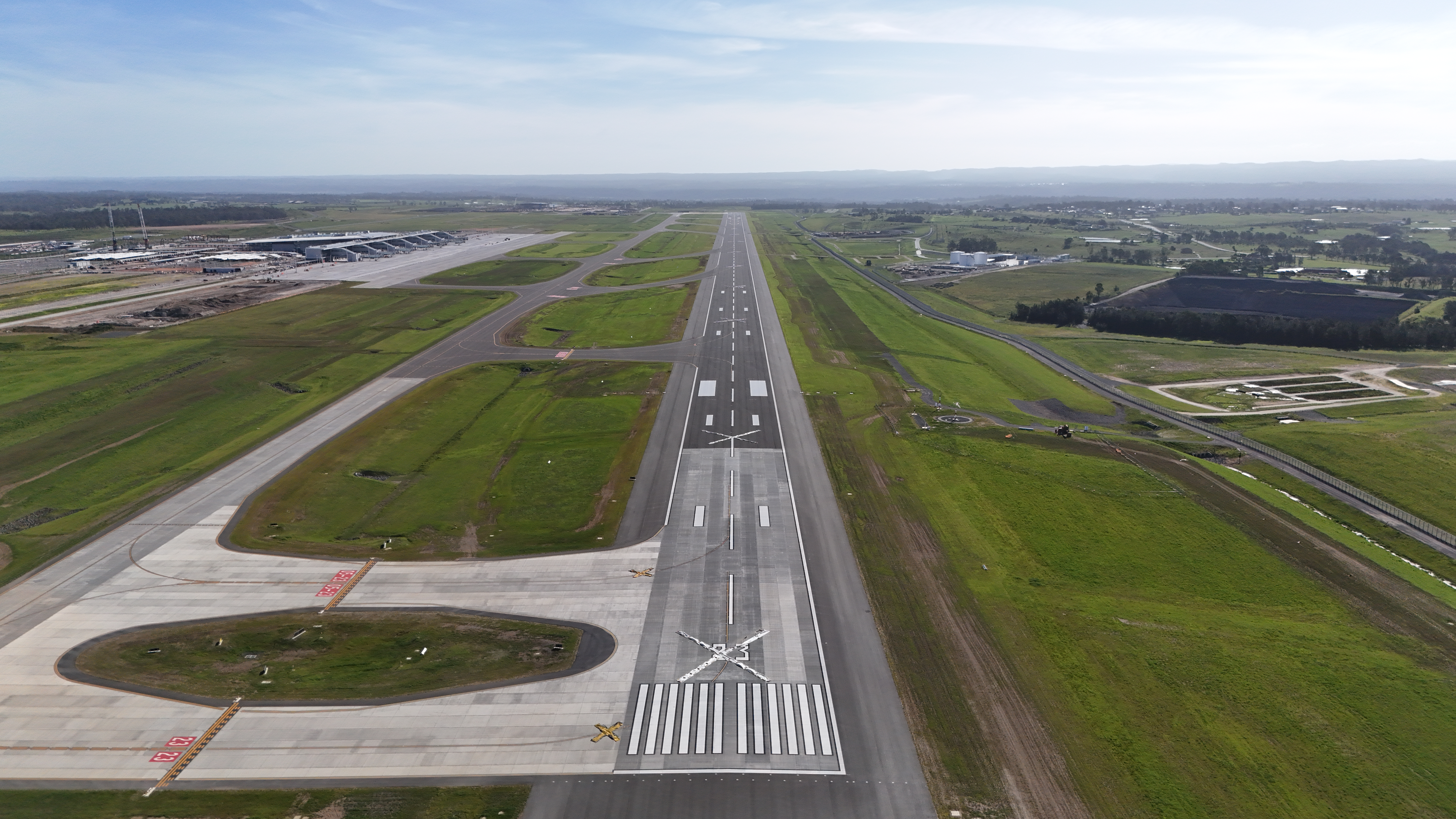
The completed runway, January 2025

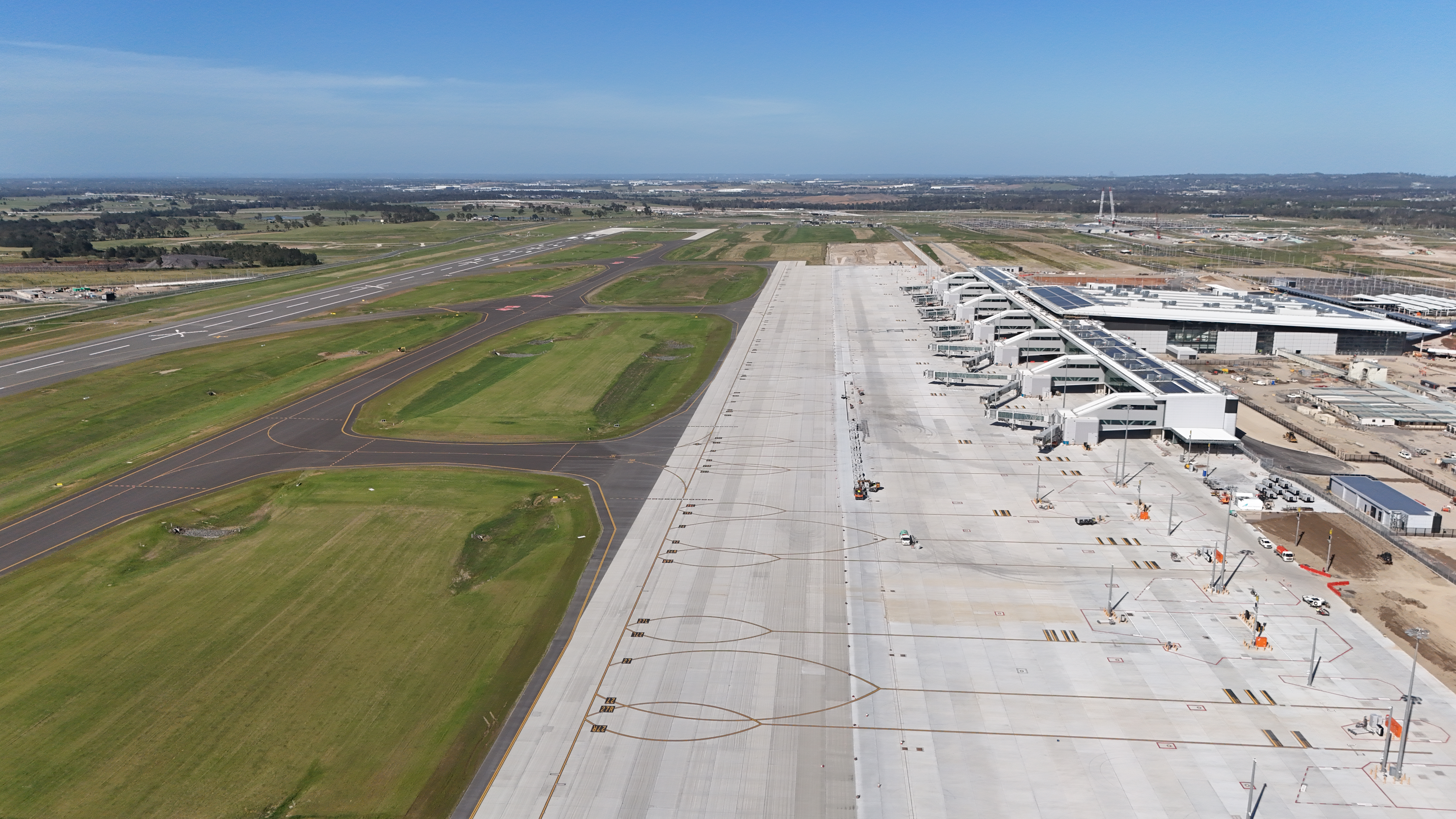
Terminal, runway and surrounding apron in January 2025

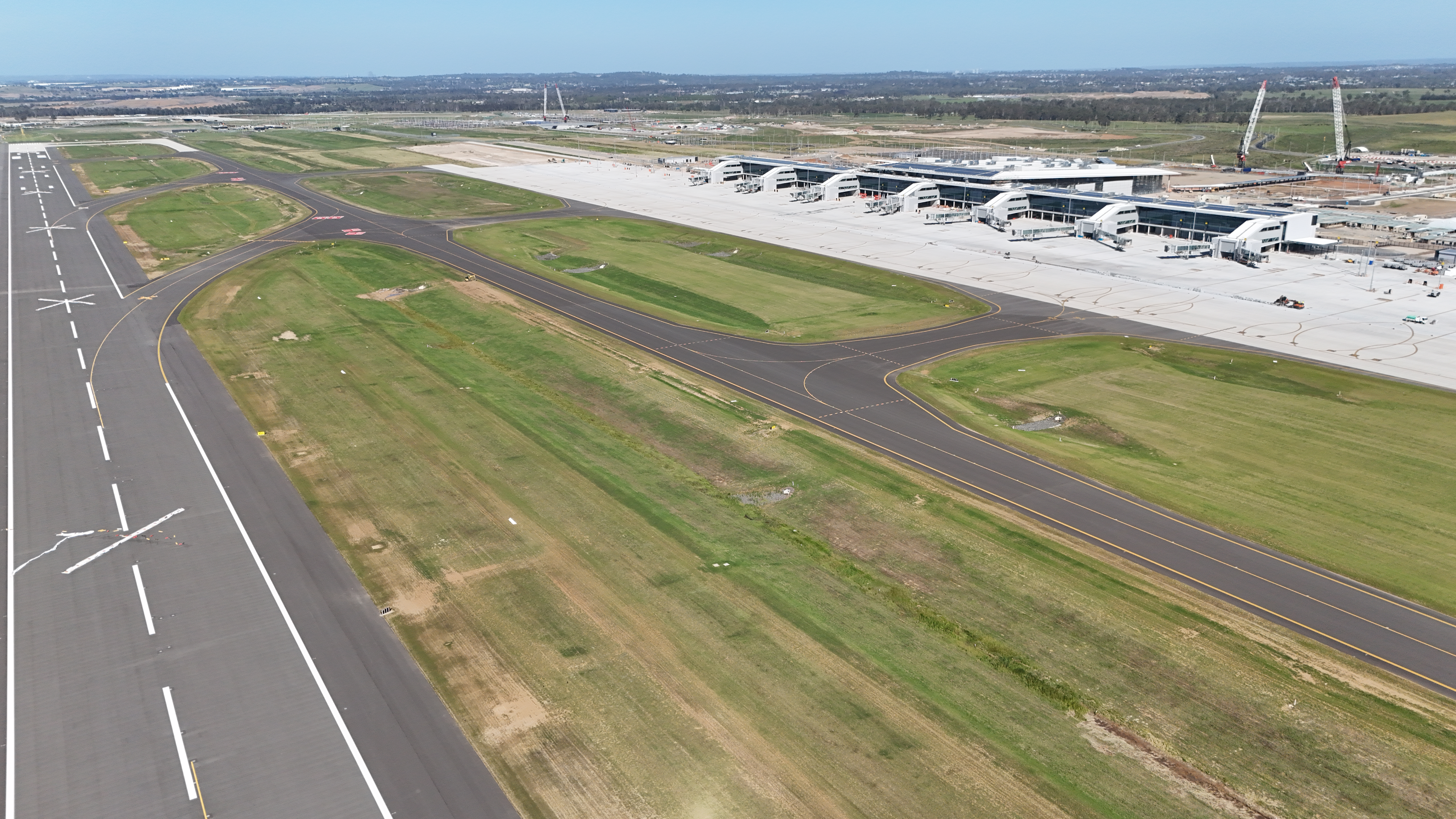
Terminal runway and surrounding apron in January 2025

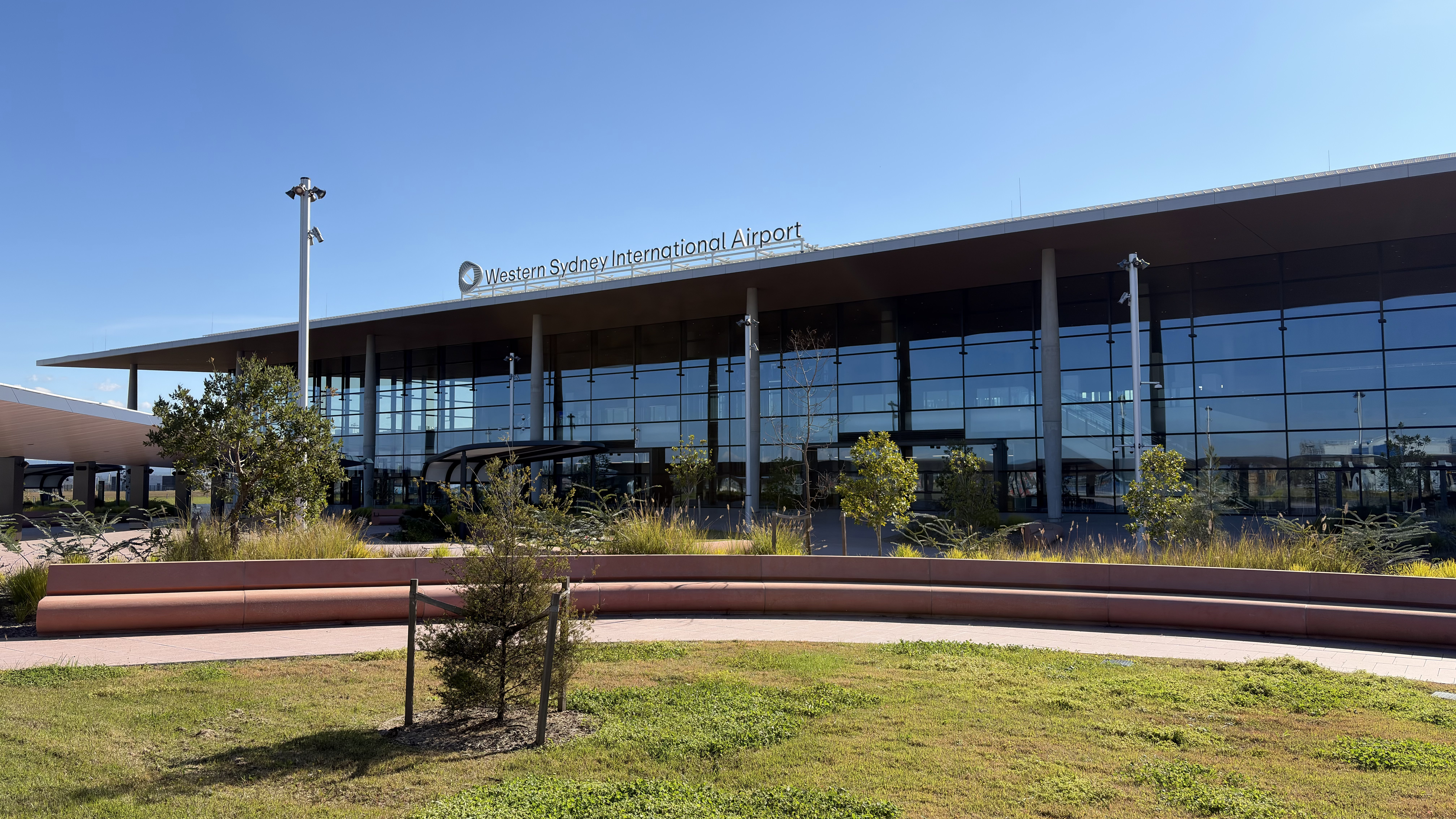
The terminal forecourt, open to the public for the first time in July 2026

Airport gateway sign at dusk

Terminal forecourt at dusk following the Runway Run community event in April 2026

=== Timeline ===
==== Development milestones ====
Date	Milestone	Notes
15 April 2014	The Federal Government designated Badgerys Creek as the site for the Second Sydney Airport. Commencement of planning for the site	
18 August 2014	Federal Government formally issues a 'Notice to Consult' to the Sydney Airport Group, to enable formal discussion on development and 'Right of First Refusal' to develop and operate it	
19 October 2015	Draft Environmental Impact Statement (EIS) is released for public exhibition to enable community consultation	
18 December 2015	Public exhibition and submission period for the draft EIS closes	
15 September 2016	Final Environmental Impact Statement (EIS) is released	
2 May 2017	Sydney Airport declines offer to run second airport at Badgerys Creek	
9 May 2017	As part of the Federal Budget 2017, the Federal Government committed up to A$5.3 billion over 10 years to build the Western Sydney Airport through a new company, WSA Co	
4 March 2019	Western Sydney International Airport named Nancy-Bird Walton Airport	
15 March 2023	Western Sydney International Airport gets its official IATA code "WSI"	
8 June 2023	Qantas announces agreement with Western Sydney International Airport to launch service on both Qantas and Jetstar from the airport when it opens.	
23 October 2023	Draft Environmental Impact Statement (EIS), released by the federal government for public feedback.	
27 August 2024	Singapore Airlines announced as the first international carrier to serve Western Sydney International Airport.	
28 October 2025	An Australian New South Wales Rural Fire Service-owned Boeing 737 lands on the 3.7 km runway at Badgery's Creek. This is the first commercial-sized jet to land on the airport's tarmac.	
5 July 2026	WSI bus terminal opened to public and regular bus services commenced between WSI and Penrith (790), Mount Druitt (772), Liverpool (825 & 860) and Campbelltown (845)	
9 July 2026	Class C airspace for Western Sydney International Airport came into effect	
27 July 2026	Cargo operations commenced	
25 October 2026	Regularly scheduled passenger operations commenced	
25 October 2026	First domestic passenger flight takes off, operated by Jetstar and bound for Gold Coast (OOL)	
26 October 2026	First international passenger flight takes off, operated by Air New Zealand and bound for Auckland (AKL)	

==== Construction timeline ====
Date	Milestone	Notes
20 January 2015	Construction begins on upgrading Bringelly Road. This is the first major upgrade to one of the three roads servicing the airport	
20 January 2015	Geotechnical investigations, to profile the subsoil and rock, begin on the airport site	
June 2015	Residents vacate government land reserved for airport	
Early 2016	Construction starts on upgrading roads surrounding the airport site	
30 June 2018	After being shortlisted in April, Bechtel was awarded the delivery partner contract by Western Sydney Airport Co.	
24 September 2018	Construction of Stage 1 officially began at the airport site	
4 June 2021	Construction of terminal awarded to Multiplex Construction Pty Ltd	
21 November 2021	Terminal building construction begins	
29 January 2024	Construction of runway completed	
30 July 2024	Terminal 80% complete. A major milestone for the terminal roof built.	
11 June 2025	Terminal construction complete. Keys were handed over to the federal government, but a year of testing remains before passengers can take off.	
25 October 2026	Western Sydney Airport in full operation	

== Future expansions ==
Stage 1, opening in 2026, is expected to be able to handle a capacity of up to 10 million annual passengers. Demand for the airport is expected to reach 37 million annual passengers by 2050, which would then require a second parallel runway. The airport is then expected to reach its ultimate capacity of 82 million annual passengers by 2063.

To handle the future growth and capacity, future stages of the airport are expected to include:

- Expansion of the terminal building or additional terminals
- Second parallel runway (05R/23L) at the southern side of the airport precinct, to be located approximately 1,900 m (6,200 ft) from the first runway (05L/23R)

== Airlines and destinations ==
Terminal common area

Airport terminal gate lounge

Qantas and its subsidiary Jetstar became the first airlines to reach a commercial agreement with WSA Co on 8 June 2023. Qantas and Jetstar aircraft would be based there within a year of opening, with projected destinations to include Melbourne, Brisbane and Gold Coast. Singapore Airlines was the first international airline to announce plans to serve the airport, with nonstop flights to and from Changi Airport; its daily service using Airbus A350-900 aircraft is scheduled to commence 23 November 2026, taking advantage of the airport's curfew-free operations to offer a late-night departure from Sydney.

=== Passenger ===
Airlines	Destinations
Air New Zealand	Auckland
Fiji Airways	Nadi (begins 19 March 2027)
Jetstar	Brisbane, Denpasar (begins 15 March 2027), Gold Coast, Melbourne
QantasLink	Brisbane, Melbourne (both begin 28 March 2027)
Qatar Airways	Doha (begins 15 December 2027)
Singapore Airlines	Singapore
VietJet Air	Ho Chi Minh City (begins 10 January 2027)

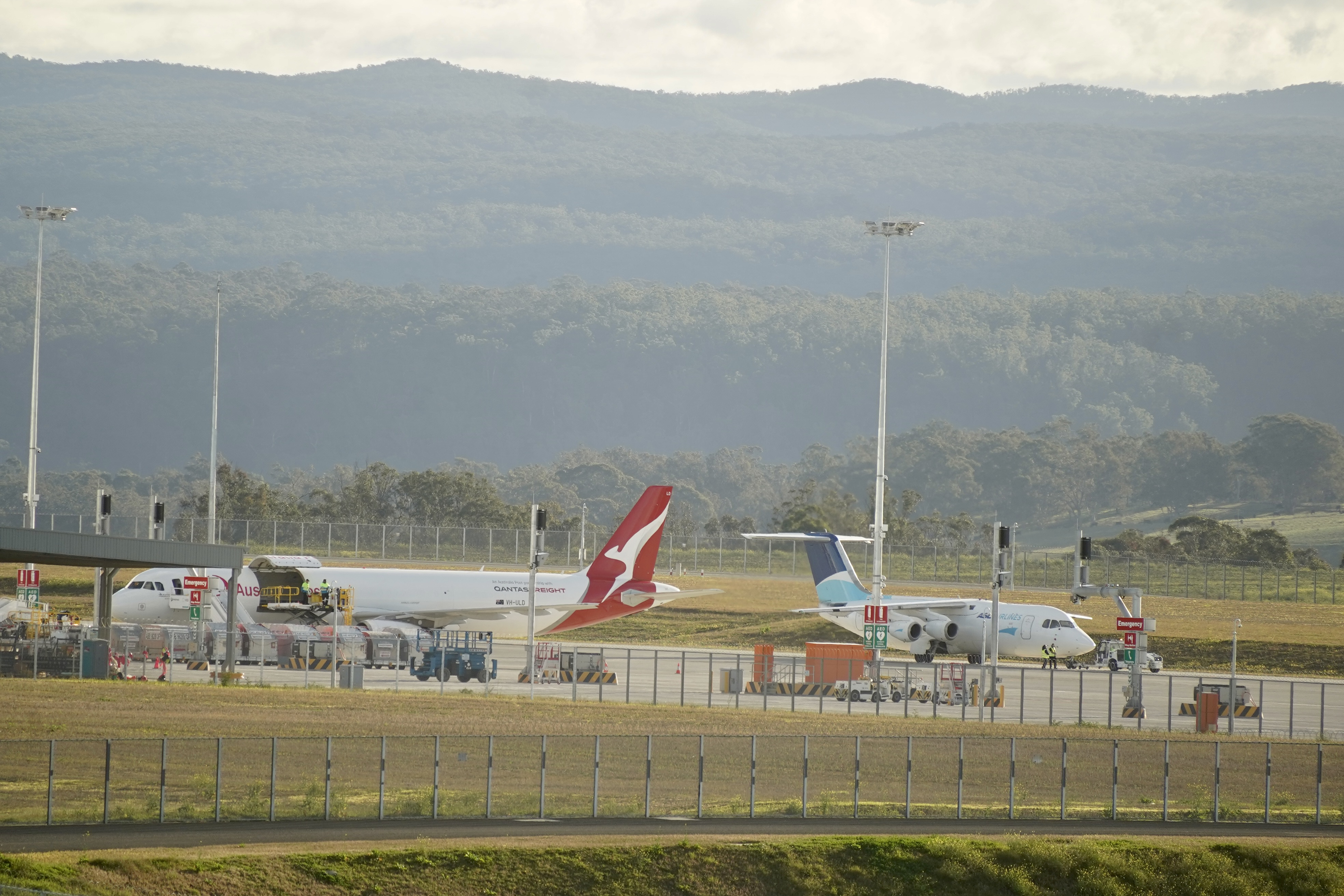
Qantas Freight and ASL Airlines at the Cargo Terminal

=== Cargo ===
The airport opened for regular freight services on 27 July 2026 with initial operator Qantas Freight, along with ASL Airlines and National Jet Express flying on behalf of Qantas.

Airlines	Destinations
Qantas Freight	Adelaide, Brisbane, Cairns, Melbourne, Perth

== Ground transport ==
=== Road ===
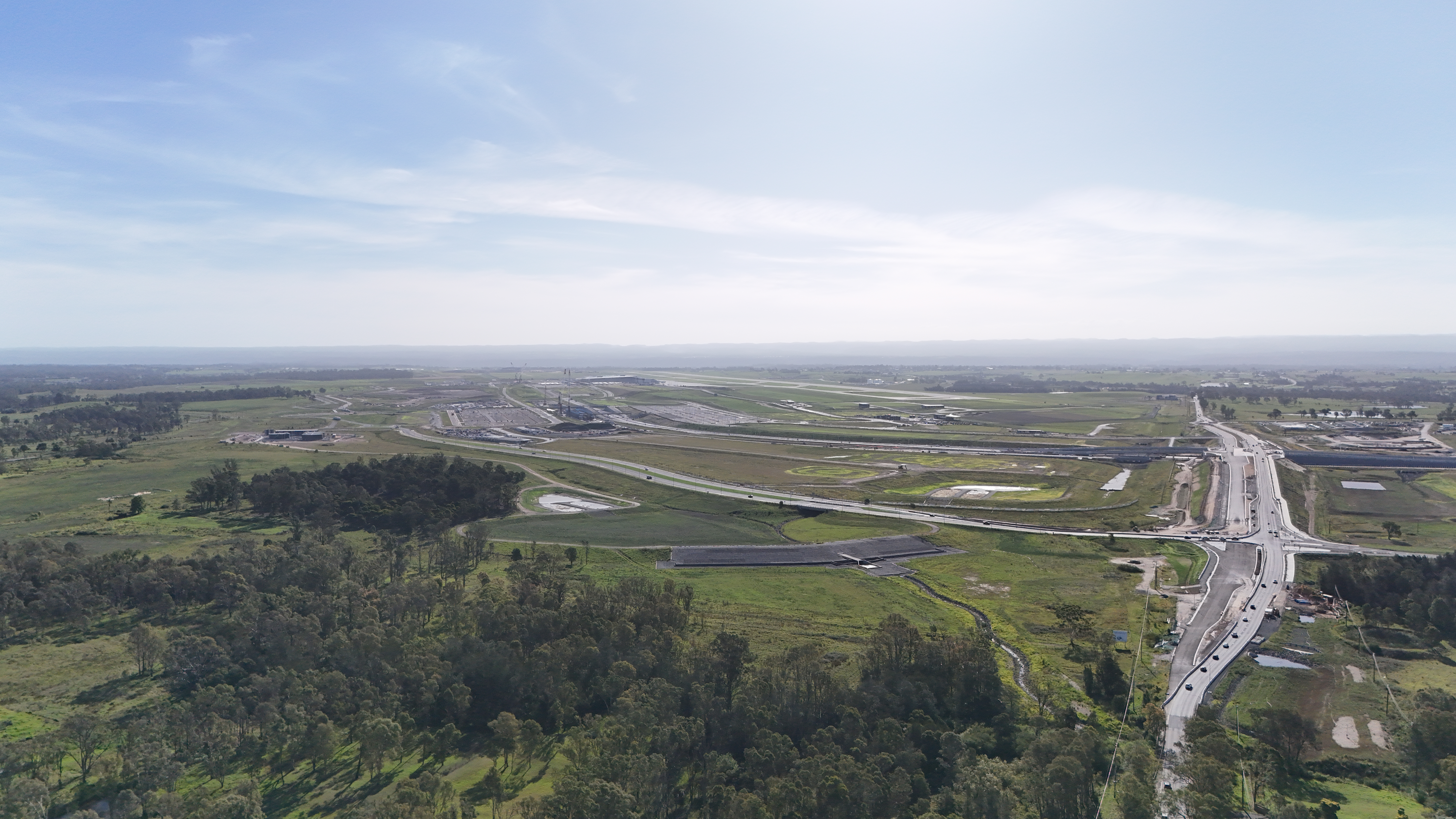
The M12 Motorway near the Western Sydney Airport under construction in 2025

With the designation of the site as the location of Sydney's second airport, announcements were made on new and upgraded transport links to the airport and the surrounding areas of western Sydney. Known as the Western Sydney Infrastructure Plan, it included:

- A new M12 east-west motorway to the airport, around the current alignment of Elizabeth Drive between the M7 Westlink Motorway and The Northern Road
- Upgrading of The Northern Road to a minimum of four lanes from Narellan to the M4 Motorway
- Upgrading of Bringelly Road to a minimum of four lanes between The Northern Road and Camden Valley Way

All projects of the Western Sydney Infrastructure Plan were completed prior to the airport opening, with the M12 motorway opening on 14 March 2026.

=== Public transport ===
==== Rail ====
In 2018, the federal and state governments announced the development of stage 1 of the Sydney Metro Western Sydney Airport, as part of the Western Sydney City Deal. The rail project involves the construction of a 23 km (14 mi) line as part of the Sydney Metro system.

The line will operate between Bradfield station and St Marys station on the existing Main Western railway line, providing connections operated by Sydney Trains T1 Western Line towards Parramatta and Sydney CBD. Services will stop at the Airport Terminal and Airport Business Park stations within the airport precinct.

Construction of the line commenced in December 2022 and was expected to be complete in late-2026, in time for the opening of the airport. After disputes with head contractor Webuild, operations will not commence until at least 2027. The state government later announced that between the airport opening and metro opening, services would be provided by a free interim bus service between the airport and St Marys.

==== Bus ====
Western Sydney Airport bus interchange

Five bus routes to the airport from major western suburbs such as Penrith, Mount Druitt, Liverpool, Leppington and Campbelltown operated by TfNSW commenced operating in July 2026.

WSI Link, a free shuttle bus service under route WS1, commenced on 25 October 2026. This service operates non-stop to and from St Marys station and will run until the Sydney Metro Western Sydney Airport line opens.

The Super Shuttle WSI shuttle bus operated by North Sydney Bus Charters commenced on 25 October 2026. Operated by electric buses, services run to Parramatta, the Sydney CBD and Sydney Airport.

From the bus interchange, FlixBus operates services to and from Canberra, Goulburn and Parramatta.

== Criticism ==
The location of the airport has been criticised over the lack of public transport options and the distance to the Sydney CBD with some comparisons to the former Montréal–Mirabel International Airport in Montreal, Canada. It is projected by WSA Co according to the 2025–2045 Preliminary Draft Master Plan that the majority of passengers are projected to travel to and from the airport using private vehicles.

Western Sydney Airport has also been criticised for the lack of confirmed agreements with airlines pre-opening.

=== Missing fuel pipeline ===
In September 2024, it was revealed that the airport would open without a fuel pipeline, with plans to transport aviation fuel to the airport by trucks from up to 50 km (31 mi) away. It is estimated the airport would need 50–60 tankers a day, raising concerns about safety as well as congestion, delays and reliability. NSW Government stated they were working with other agencies to identify a corridor for a future pipeline.

=== Missing fire station ===
In March 2026, safety concerns were raised by the Daily Telegraph about the lack of progress on the Badgerys Creek Fire Station. Although the airport's Aviation Rescue and Fire Firefighting station had been completed, the accompanying $57 million Fire and Rescue NSW station was yet to commence construction. Following these concerns, Fire and Rescue NSW hastily converted an interim property near the airport into a temporary fire station, with construction of the original station expected to be completed in June 2027.

=== Remote-control tower camera issues ===
In August 2026, the Sydney Morning Herald uncovered issues with the airport's remote-control tower, revealing that due to the poor quality of the tower's cameras the Civil Aviation Safety Authority could not certify the airport's controllers to visually separate aircraft, forcing sequenced separations of aircraft in 15 nautical mile spacing. Sources speaking on the condition of anonymity stated that "the visibility was quite poor. They look like mosquitos". Air Services Australia stated that no changes to the cameras were planned and air traffic services had been designed to safely accommodate flights.

=== Leppington Triangle corruption investigation ===
On 31 July 2018, the Commonwealth Government purchased a 12.26-hectare (30.3-acre) triangular parcel of land in Bringelly, adjacent to the site of the airport. The A$29.8 million land purchase was for a portion of a second runway, expected to be needed after 2050. Eleven months after the purchase, the parcel of land was valued at just $3.1 million, triggering an investigation by the Australian National Audit Office (ANAO). For the purposes of realigning The Northern Road, the NSW Government acquired an adjacent 1.363-hectare (3.37-acre) portion of the Leppington Triangle for A$149,000; a land value 22 times less per hectare than that paid by the Commonwealth Government for its portion. The ANAO found serious shortcomings in the Commonwealth's acquisition processes, including that:

- the government did not exercise appropriate due diligence in its acquisition and fell short of ethical standards
- an appropriate acquisition strategy was not developed
- the approach taken to valuing the land was inappropriate
- decision-makers were not appropriately advised on the land acquisition
- the incomplete advice provided to decision-makers and the inadequate response when questions were raised by the ANAO were inconsistent with effective and ethical stewardship of public resources.

Subsequent to this, the Australian Federal Police announced that they were investigating potential corruption related to the land deal. The investigation closed in 2021 with no evidence of criminal conduct being found.

=== Bribery investigation and conviction ===
In March 2024, the National Anti Corruption Commission and the Australian Federal Police commended an investigation into corrupt dealings by Western Sydney Airport executives. Following his arrest the year prior, in July 2025 the Western Sydney Airport Procurement Manager was convicted of soliciting a corrupt commission after attempting to solicit a $200,000 bribe/kickback for a $5 million airport contract.

== See also ==
- List of airports in Greater Sydney
