= Badgerys Creek =

- Suburb
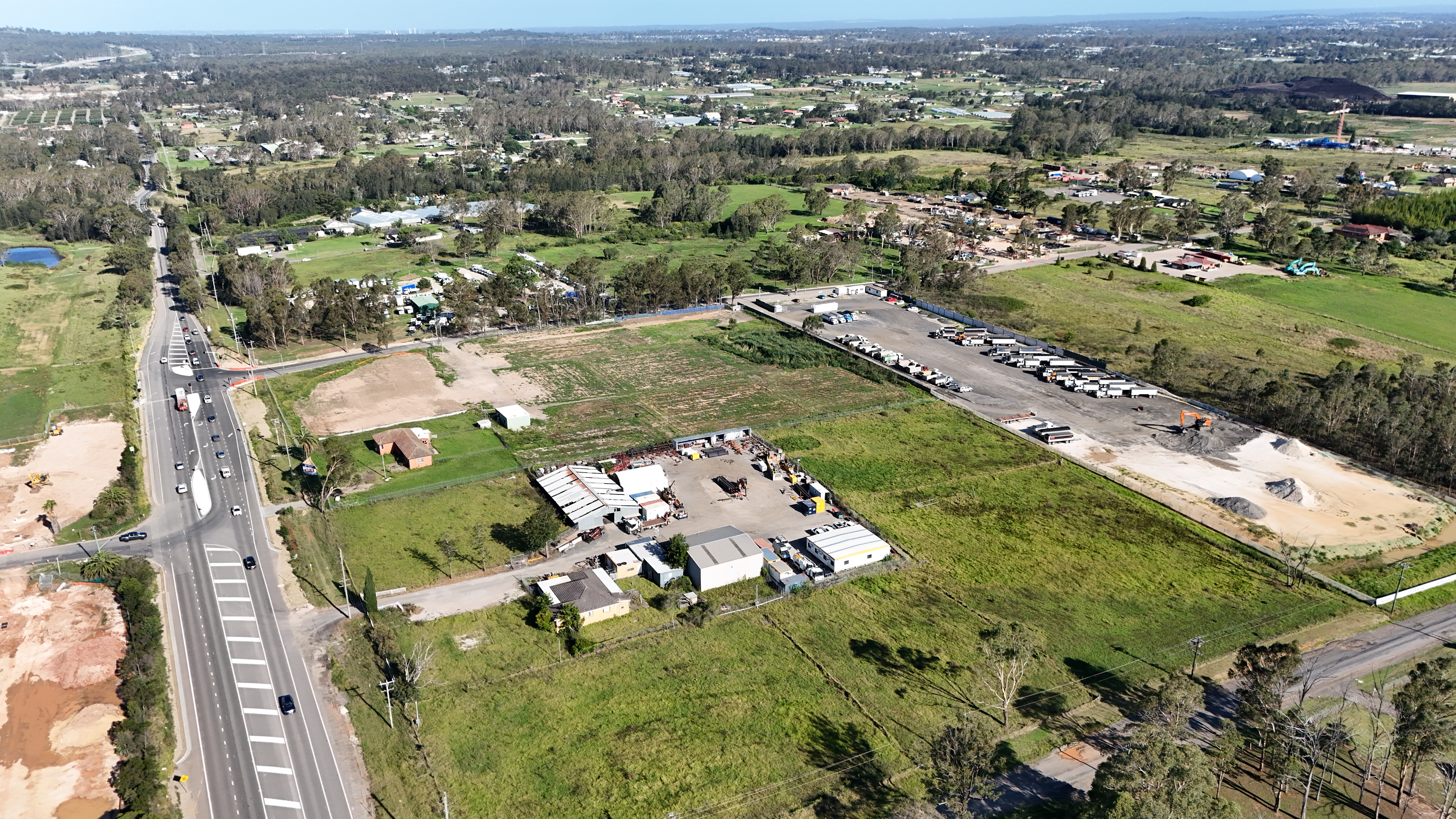
- Aerial view of Badgerys Creek

- Interactive map of Badgerys Creek
- Coordinates: 33°52′47″S 150°45′08″E
- Country: Australia
- State: New South Wales
- City: Sydney
- LGA: City of Liverpool
- Location: 41 km (25 mi) west of Sydney CBD

Government
  - State electorate: Badgerys Creek
  - Federal divisions: Lindsay; Hume
- Elevation: 81 m (266 ft)

Population
  - Total: 168 (SAL 2021)
- Postcode: 2555
Suburbs around Badgerys Creek
| Luddenham | Luddenham | Kemps Creek |
| Luddenham | Badgerys Creek | Kemps Creek |
| Bringelly | Bradfield | Kemps Creek |

Badgerys Creek, also known as Badgery's Creek, is a suburb of Sydney, in the state of New South Wales, Australia, located approximately 41 kilometres (25 mi) west of the Sydney central business district, in the local government areas of the City of Liverpool. It is part of the Greater Western Sydney region and is adjacent to Kemps Creek, Austral and the Blue Mountains.

The suburb is best known as being the site of the Western Sydney Airport which began flight operations in 2026.

== History ==
James Badgery was a British-born farmer and miller who, in 1806, was granted 840 acres (3.4 km^{2}) in the suburb that bears his name today. His original land grant was on the north side of Elizabeth Drive; land which today is used for farming research by the CSIRO and University of Sydney. Badgery named his property Exeter Farm but the creek running through the property became known as Badgery's Creek and that name was eventually applied to the local area.

Badgery bought other land to the south of his grant and after he died, the area was subdivided in the 1880s, vastly increasing the local population. Badgerys Creek Post Office opened on 10 July 1894 and closed in 1989. A school was established in 1895 and the area gradually developed as a rural suburb which by 1981 had a population of 1,560.

From 1954 until 1991, the Fleurs field station at Badgerys Creek was an important site for Australian radio astronomy, hosting several radio telescope arrays. The station was initially operated by CSIRO, and then later by the University of Sydney.

In 1986, the federal government announced that the Second Sydney Airport would be sited at Badgerys Creek. The government bought a number of properties for that purpose, and as a result of that, as well as concerns about living near an airport, many people moved away, meaning that by 1996 there were fewer than 500 residents. By the 2021 census the population had further shrunk to 168. Construction of the airport had not started, but in 2012 an A$8 million report into Sydney's aviation needs found that Badgerys Creek remained the best site, with construction subsequently scheduled to start in 2016.

In March 2023, a south-eastern portion of Badgerys Creek became part of the newly gazetted suburb of Bradfield.

== Geography ==
Badgerys Creek flows north into a reservoir in the suburb's north, as does South Creek, the suburb's eastern boundary. West of the reservoir lies Mills Hill, and south-west of that, by just over a kilometre, is Raymond Hill, 125 metres (410 ft) AHD. The western boundary is Oaky Creek, and then Cosgrove Creek after the two merge 500 metres (1,600 ft) north of Elizabeth Drive, and to the south-west the hill known as Anchau (118 metres (387 ft) AHD).

=== Climate ===
Badgerys Creek has a humid subtropical climate (Cfa) with hot summers, which vary from dry to humid, and cool winters. Due to its open grassy location, nighttime temperatures are slightly lower than the nearby suburban areas in western Sydney. There is the occasional frost in some winter mornings, where the months from April to September have recorded severe frost. Most of the rain falls in late summer and early autumn, which is usually accompanied by a thunderstorm. Due to the foehn effect, the driest months are in late winter and early spring, which have the most sunniest days.

On 4 January 2020, a heat logger registered a temperature of 50.1 °C (122.2 °F) in the suburb, which was on the same day when Penrith recorded a temperature of 48.9 °C (120.0 °F). A low of −4.6 °C (23.7 °F) was recorded on 12 July 2002.

Climate data for Badgerys Creek (1995–present)
| Month | Jan | Feb | Mar | Apr | May | Jun | Jul | Aug | Sep | Oct | Nov | Dec | Year |
|---|---|---|---|---|---|---|---|---|---|---|---|---|---|
| Record high °C (°F) | 47.6 (117.7) | 46.5 (115.7) | 40.4 (104.7) | 36.0 (96.8) | 29.4 (84.9) | 25.2 (77.4) | 27.0 (80.6) | 29.9 (85.8) | 36.4 (97.5) | 37.4 (99.3) | 41.9 (107.4) | 44.6 (112.3) | 47.6 (117.7) |
| Mean daily maximum °C (°F) | 30.0 (86.0) | 28.8 (83.8) | 26.8 (80.2) | 24.1 (75.4) | 20.7 (69.3) | 17.8 (64.0) | 17.6 (63.7) | 19.3 (66.7) | 22.7 (72.9) | 24.9 (76.8) | 26.5 (79.7) | 28.5 (83.3) | 24.0 (75.2) |
| Mean daily minimum °C (°F) | 17.2 (63.0) | 17.1 (62.8) | 15.4 (59.7) | 11.5 (52.7) | 7.6 (45.7) | 5.5 (41.9) | 4.2 (39.6) | 4.8 (40.6) | 7.8 (46.0) | 10.7 (51.3) | 13.6 (56.5) | 15.4 (59.7) | 10.9 (51.6) |
| Record low °C (°F) | 8.2 (46.8) | 8.5 (47.3) | 6.4 (43.5) | −0.1 (31.8) | −1.1 (30.0) | −3.0 (26.6) | −4.5 (23.9) | −2.0 (28.4) | −0.5 (31.1) | 2.2 (36.0) | 5.3 (41.5) | 6.6 (43.9) | −4.5 (23.9) |
| Average precipitation mm (inches) | 78.5 (3.09) | 107.9 (4.25) | 106.3 (4.19) | 47.9 (1.89) | 38.8 (1.53) | 55.1 (2.17) | 33.0 (1.30) | 36.8 (1.45) | 34.6 (1.36) | 57.7 (2.27) | 68.9 (2.71) | 56.3 (2.22) | 726.2 (28.59) |
| Average precipitation days (≥ 1 mm) | 7.1 | 7.7 | 8.3 | 5.8 | 3.7 | 5.6 | 3.8 | 3.3 | 4.7 | 5.8 | 6.8 | 6.4 | 69.0 |
| Average relative humidity (%) | 49 | 55 | 55 | 52 | 53 | 56 | 50 | 44 | 44 | 45 | 50 | 48 | 50 |

== Commercial area ==
North of Elizabeth Drive, a substantial amount of land is taken up by the CSIRO Research Station, the University of Sydney MacGarvie Smith Veterinary Farm, and a landfill depot. Much of the research establishment is dotted with reservoirs. The southeast includes a brickworks, and land owned by Telstra, also featuring a number of reservoirs. The suburb is also home to the Hubertus Liverpool Rifle Club.

South of Elizabeth Drive was also a settled area.

=== Schools ===
The suburb had one primary school, Badgerys Creek Public School, decommissioned in 2014 to make way for Sydney's second airport. Nearby there were two churches with cemeteries, also moved.

== Demographics ==
In the 2021 census, there were 168 people in Badgerys Creek. 51.2% of respondents were born in Australia; the next most common countries of birth included China (excluding SARs and Taiwan) 13.1%, Italy 6.0%, Malta 4.8% and Lebanon 3.0%. 39.9% of people only spoke English at home; the next most common languages spoken at home included Cantonese 20.8%, Italian 7.7%, Arabic 5.4%, Khmer 5.4% and Maltese 4.2%.

== Parks ==
The suburb is home to Badgerys Creek Park.

== Transport ==
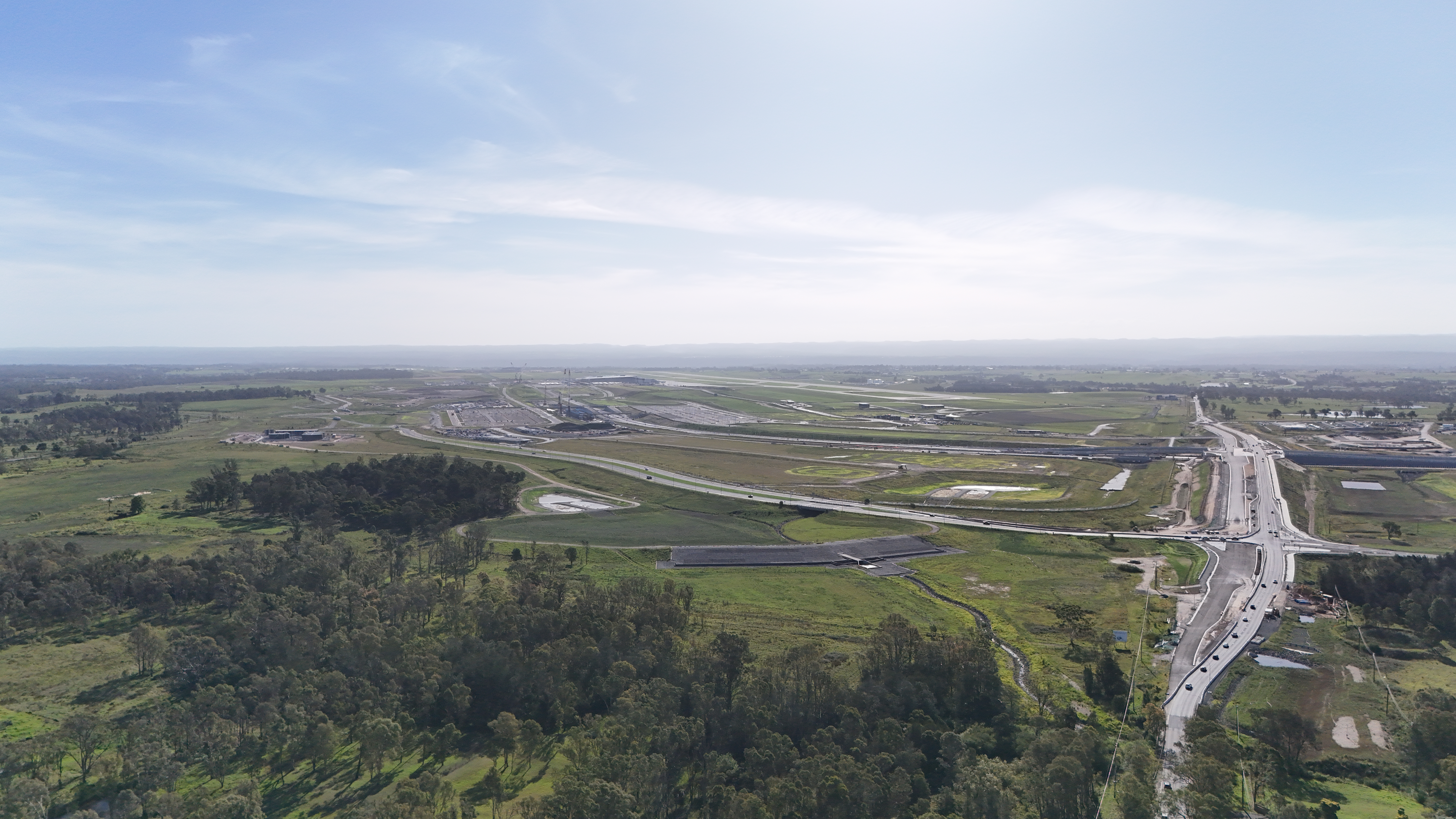
Aerial view of Western Sydney Airport from Badgerys Creek

The new Western Sydney Airport is located within the suburb of Badgerys Creek. The suburb will also be serviced by the Airport Terminal and Airport Business Park stations of the Western Sydney Airport metro line. Both stations are located within the airport complex.

The M12 Motorway opened to commuters in March 2026, and the connection to the Westlink M7 Motorway opened in June 2026. Both roads run east–west through the suburb.

The metro is currently under construction and is scheduled to open in 2027.
