= Airport Terminal metro station =

Proposed railway station in Sydney, Australia

Airport Terminal
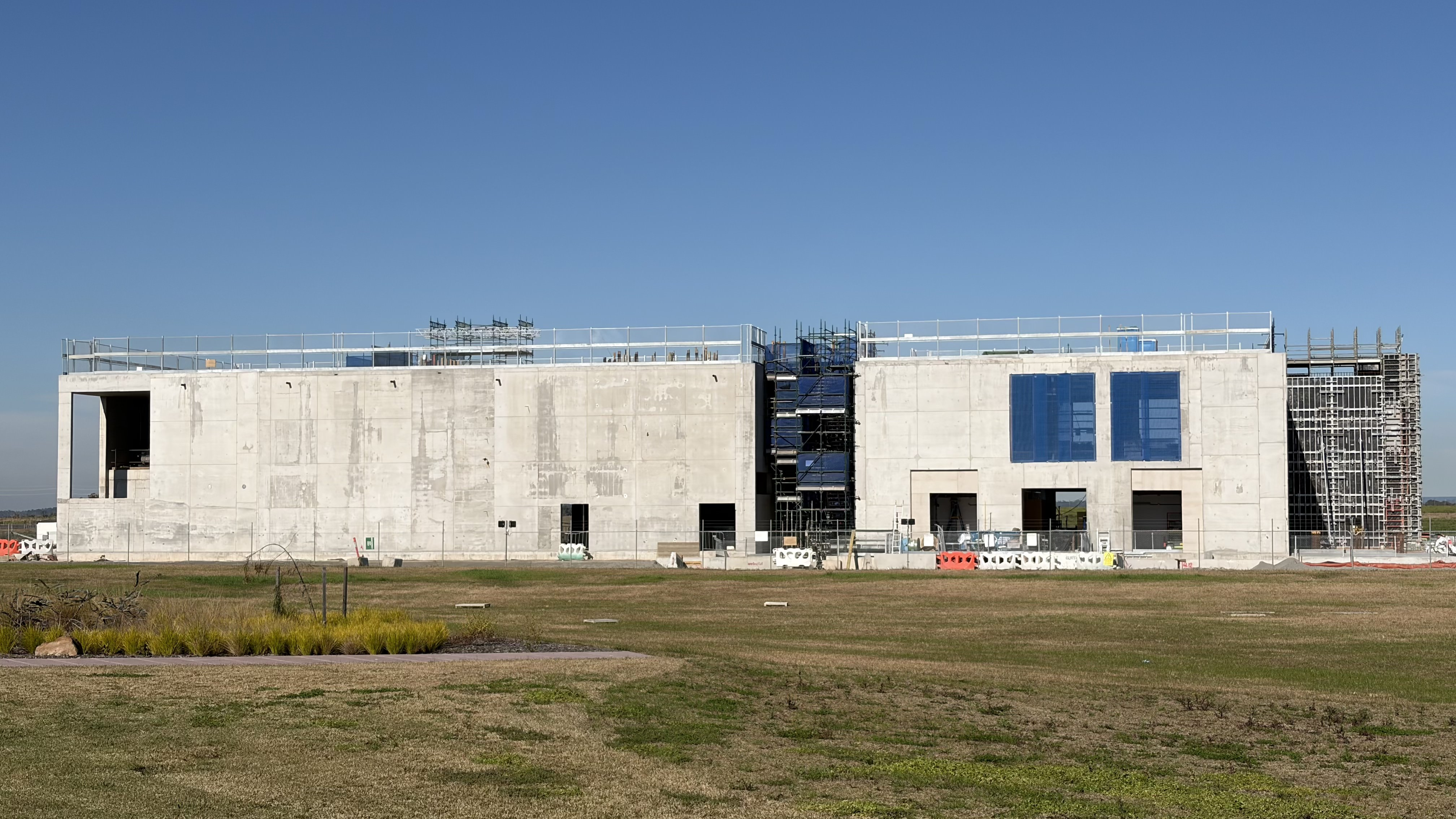
- The station building under construction in July 2026

General information
- Location: Western Sydney Airport, Badgerys Creek, New South Wales; Australia
- Owner: Transport Asset Manager of New South Wales
- Line: Western Sydney Airport
- Platforms: 2
- Tracks: 2
- Connections: Bus

Construction
- Structure type: Underground
- Accessible: Yes

Other information
- Status: Under construction

History
- Opened: 2027 (planned)

Services
Preceding station	Sydney Metro	Following station
Airport Business Park towards St Marys	Sydney Metro Western Sydney Airport	Bradfield Terminus

Airport Terminal metro station is a Sydney Metro station currently under construction. It will be located on the Western Sydney Airport line and serve the Western Sydney Airport. It is scheduled to open in 2027.

== Connections ==
In August 2025, five proposed bus routes that would service the airport precinct were announced:

- 772: Mount Druitt to WSI via St Clair
- 790: Penrith to WSI via Kingswood
- 825: Liverpool to WSI via Bonnyrigg
- 845: Campbelltown to WSI via Oran Park and Bradfield
- 860: Liverpool to WSI via Leppington and Bradfield

In March 2026, it was announced that the bus route services would begin on 5 July 2026.
