= Orchard Hills metro station =

Proposed railway station in Sydney, Australia

Orchard Hills

General information
- Location: Kent Road, Orchard Hills; Australia
- Coordinates: 33°47′15.7″S 150°45′11.7″E
- Owner: Transport Asset Manager of New South Wales
- Line: Western Sydney Airport
- Platforms: 2
- Tracks: 2

Construction
- Structure type: Open cut
- Accessible: Yes

Other information
- Status: Under construction

History
- Opened: 2027 (planned)

Services
Preceding station	Sydney Metro	Following station
St Marys Terminus	Sydney Metro Western Sydney Airport	Luddenham towards Bradfield
Location

Orchard Hills metro station is a Sydney Metro station currently under construction. Located on the Western Sydney Airport line, it will serve the suburb of Orchard Hills. It is scheduled to open in 2027.
