= Luddenham metro station =

Proposed railway station in Sydney, Australia

Luddenham
- The station building under construction in October 2026 with the exterior fittings nearing completion

General information
- Location: Luddenham Road, Luddenham, New South Wales; Australia
- Coordinates: 33°50′18.6″S 150°44′25.4″E
- Owner: Transport Asset Manager of New South Wales
- Line: Western Sydney Airport
- Platforms: 2
- Tracks: 2

Construction
- Structure type: Elevated
- Accessible: Yes

Other information
- Status: Under construction

History
- Opened: 2027 (planned)

Services
| Preceding station | Sydney Metro | Following station |
|---|---|---|
| Orchard Hills towards St Marys | Sydney Metro Western Sydney Airport | Airport Business Park towards Bradfield |
Location

Luddenham metro station is a Sydney Metro station currently under construction. Located on the Western Sydney Airport line, it will serve the suburb of Luddenham. It is scheduled to open in 2027.

== Design ==
The station is a green-field development reaching 13.5m tall, it is the only station on the line constructed on an elevated viaduct.
