= Airport Business Park metro station =

Proposed railway station in Sydney, Australia

Airport Business Park
- The station building under construction in July 2026

General information
- Location: Badgerys Creek; Australia
- Owner: Transport Asset Manager of New South Wales
- Line: Western Sydney Airport
- Platforms: 2
- Tracks: 2

Construction
- Structure type: Open cut
- Accessible: Yes

Other information
- Status: Planned

History
- Opened: 2027 (planned)

Services
Preceding station	Sydney Metro	Following station
Luddenham towards St Marys	Sydney Metro Western Sydney Airport	Airport Terminal towards Bradfield

Airport Business Park metro station is a Sydney Metro station currently under construction on the Western Sydney Airport line. It will serve the suburb of Badgerys Creek. It is scheduled to open in 2027.
