= Luddenham, New South Wales =

Luddenham
- Suburb
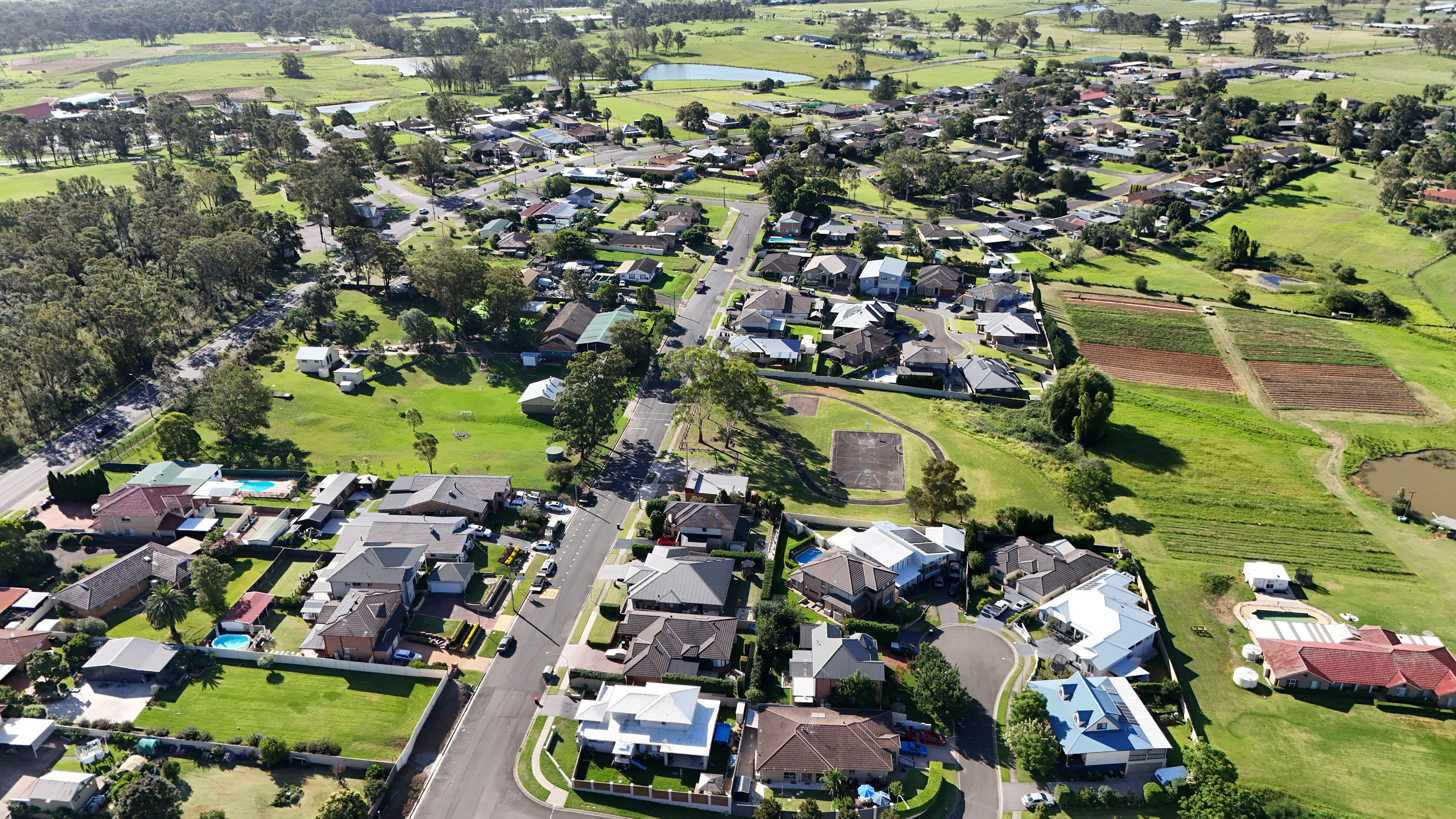
- Aerial view of Luddenham

- Interactive map of Luddenham
- Country: Australia
- State: New South Wales
- City: Sydney
- LGAs: Penrith City Council; Liverpool City Council
- Location: 64 km (40 mi) W of Sydney; 16 km (9.9 mi) SE of Penrith

Government
  - State electorate: Badgerys Creek
  - Federal divisions: Hume; Lindsay
- Elevation: 106 m (348 ft)

Population
  - Total: 1,927 (SAL 2021)
- Postcode: 2745
Suburbs around Luddenham
Mulgoa	Orchard Hills	Erskine Park
Wallacia	Luddenham	Kemps Creek
Greendale	Bringelly	Badgerys Creek

Luddenham is a semi-rural suburb of Sydney, in the state of New South Wales, Australia, 64 kilometres west of the Sydney central business district, in the local government areas of the City of Penrith and City of Liverpool. As of the 2021 Census it has a population of 1,927. It is part of the Greater Western Sydney region.

It is known for the long running Luddenham Show and its proximity to Western Sydney Airport. It will sit in the Western Sydney Airport Aerotropolis.

== History ==
Luddenham takes its name from a property which was situated between South Creek and the Nepean River that was owned by John Blaxland, who received a grant of 6,710 acres (27.2 km^{2}) on 30 November 1813. His elder brother was the more famous Gregory Blaxland and Luddenham was the name of their family property in Kent, England.

The first Luddenham Post Office opened on 1 January 1857 and was renamed Bringelly in 1863. The current office opened on 1 March 1872.

=== Western Sydney Airport ===
Western Sydney Airport is located less a kilometre from Luddenham Village. The village is located in an agribusiness zone which does not permit new residential construction. In 2022 New South Wales government plan proposed building between 550 and 1,200 houses to the north of the village. This plan was supported by Penrith City Council and the Luddenham Progress association, who have said that the village would die if new houses were not built. The plan was blocked by the state government owned Western Sydney Airport Corporation.

== Demographics ==
In the 2021 census, there were 1,927 people in Luddenham. The central village of Luddenham has a population of 456.

=== Cultural Diversity ===
As of the 2021 census, Luddenham has a notable Italian-Australian Community, with 14.7% of people describing themselves as Italian, much higher than the state total of 3.7%. 2.1% of people in Luddenham were born in Italy. The Luddenham Village Cafe is Italian and serves as a small Italian supermarket.

It also has a Maltese Australian population, with 9.9% of people describing themselves as Maltese, much higher than the state total of 1%. This community mostly exists in the rural parts of Luddenham, and not in the central village.

=== Religion ===
49.0% of people in Luddenham described themselves as Catholic, higher than the National total of 20.0%. 18.7% of people described themselves as having no religion, compared to the national total of 38.4%. 11.3% of people described themselves as Anglican and 3.9% Eastern Orthodox.

== Transport ==
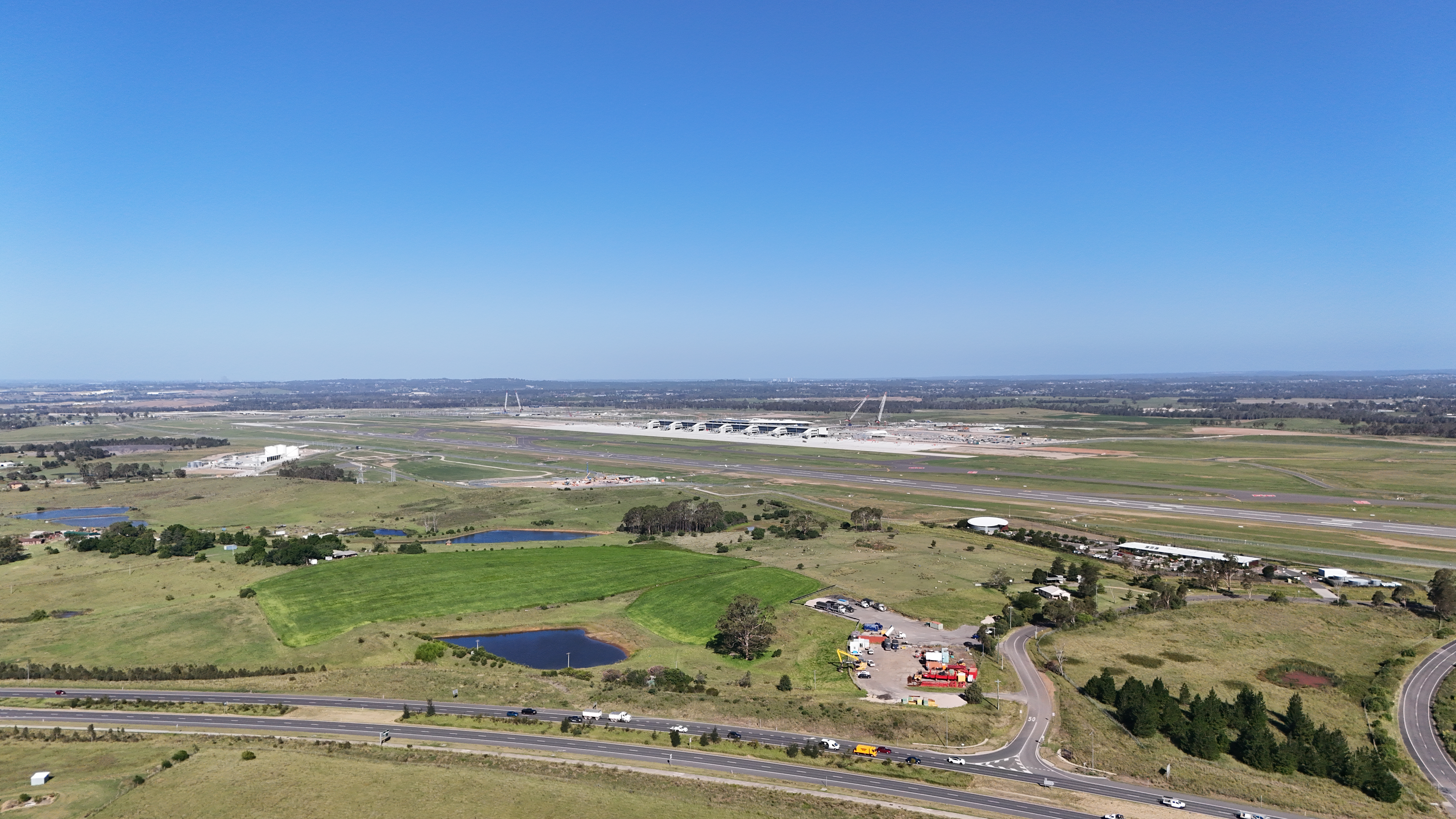
Aerial view of Western Sydney Airport from Luddenham

Luddenham has 1 bus service, route 789 between Luddenham & Penrith, operating only twice per weekday, once around 7:30am and once around 4:14pm.

Western Sydney Airport, located in the Luddenham area, was opened in 2026 to cargo and passenger services. In order to connect it to the Sydney Metro network, in June 2020, a metro station at Luddenham on the Western Sydney Airport line was announced.
