= Bradfield, New South Wales =

Bradfield
- Suburb
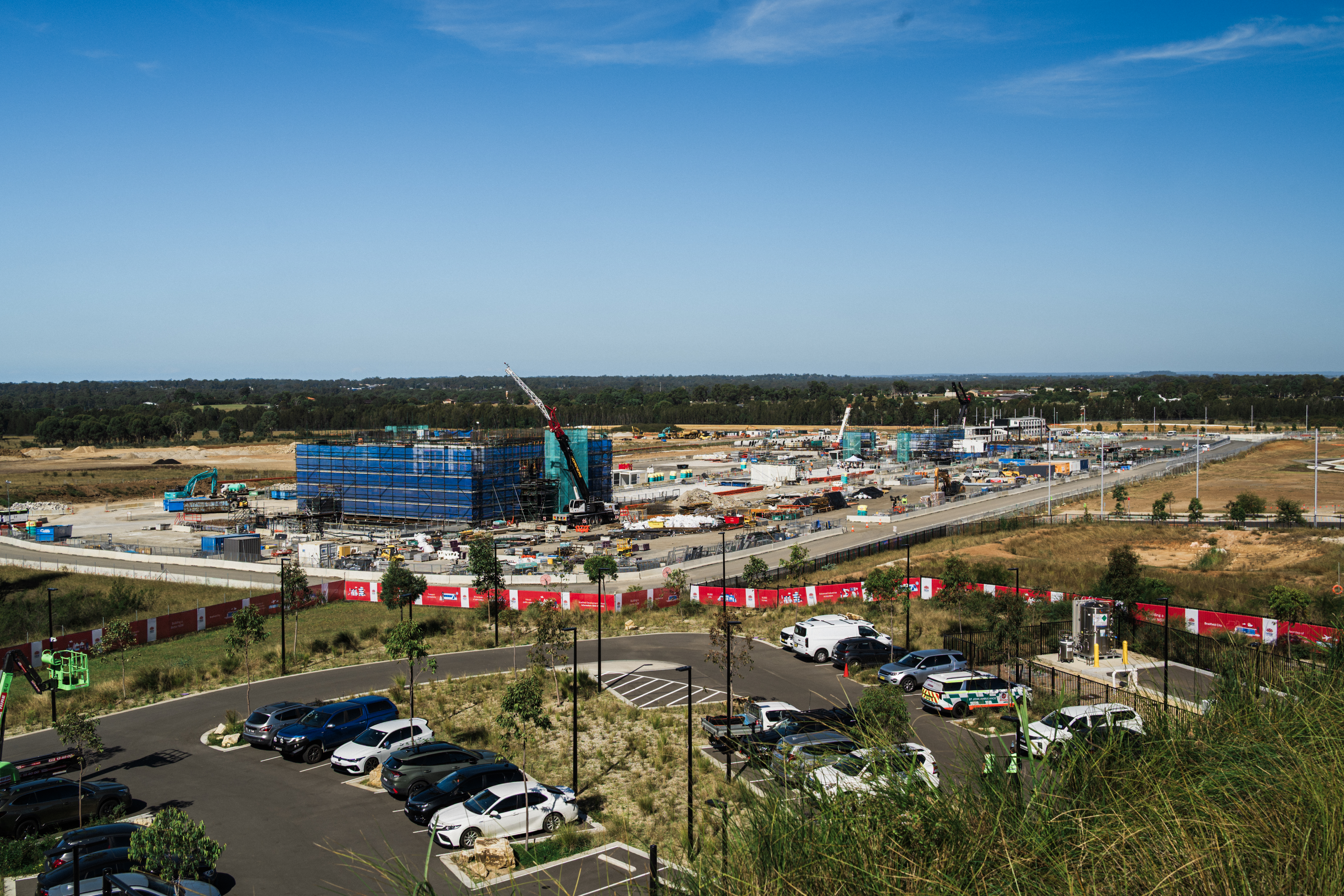
- Bradfield construction site during a community day in 2026

- Interactive map of Bradfield
- Coordinates: 33°55′04″S 150°43′48″E
- Country: Australia
- State: New South Wales
- City: Sydney
- LGA: City of Liverpool
- Location: 45 km (28 mi) west of Sydney CBD
- Established: 2023

Government
  - State electorate: Badgerys Creek
  - Federal division: Hume
- Postcode: 2556
Suburbs around Bradfield
Badgerys Creek	Badgerys Creek	Kemps Creek
Bringelly	Bradfield	Rossmore
Bringelly	Bringelly	Rossmore

Bradfield is a suburb in South Western Sydney, north of Bringelly. It was gazetted as a new suburb on 31 March 2023.

The name commemorates Dr John Job Crew Bradfield, who oversaw design and construction of the Sydney Harbour Bridge between 1913 and 1932 and the development of the city's railways, including the City Circle from Central to Circular Quay via St James or Wynyard.

== Aerotropolis Core ==
In March 2021, the NSW Government announced that a 100-hectare section of Bringelly, referred to in planning documents as 'Aerotropolis Core', would be named in Dr Bradfield's honour. Bradfield is adjacent to the construction site for the Western Sydney Airport in Badgerys Creek, and is intended to emerge as the city's third commercial centre behind Sydney and Parramatta. The name was chosen by a committee following a call for public submissions in 2020. Announcing the new name, Premier Gladys Berejiklian said that it "is synonymous with delivering game-changing infrastructure".

=== Bradfield City ===
Construction of a new city is starting in 2024 and is projected to be finished by 2074. It is intended to be the first new city in Australia in a century.

==== AMRF (Advanced Manufacturing Readiness Facility) ====
The Advanced Manufacturing Readiness Facility will be the first building to be constructed in Bradfield City. AMRF Stage 1 opened in March 2025 and is intended to support local businesses in mechanical manufacturing. AMRF Stage 2, opening in 2026, is intended to support semi-conductor and electronics manufacturing for aerospace and defence.

== Transport ==
The suburb will be serviced by the Bradfield station of the Western Sydney Airport metro line. The metro project, including Bradfield station, has been delayed to 2028. Leaked TfNSW maps and plans also include a heavy rail extension of an extension if the SWRL (South-West Rail Link) from Leppington to Bradfield.

Bradfield Station Masterplans also include a new bus interchange on Innovation East Street, composing of a transit-only road with 4-5 bus bays on the road itself, which will serve newly commissioned bus routes ti WSI and the Aerotropolis from Liverpool, Penrith and Campbelltown.

The upgrade of Fifteenth Avenue in Austral to a dual carriageway and the proposed Fifteenth Avenue Smart Transit from Liverpool to Bradfield and possibly WSI. Little information on the project is available.

The Northern Road runs along the south-western boundary of the suburb.
