= Bringelly =

- Suburb
- Interactive map of Bringelly
- Coordinates: 33°55′18″S 150°43′56″E
- Country: Australia
- State: New South Wales
- City: Sydney
- LGAs: City of Liverpool; Camden Council
- Location: 57 km (35 mi) from Sydney
- Established: 1812

Government
  - State electorate: Badgerys Creek
  - Federal division: Hume
- Elevation: 85 m (279 ft)

Population
  - Total: 2,433 (2021 census)
- Postcode: 2556
Suburbs around Bringelly
Luddenham	Badgerys Creek	Bradfield
Greendale	Bringelly	Rossmore
Cobbitty	Cobbitty	Catherine Field; Oran Park

Bringelly (/brɪŋdʒɛli/) is a suburb of Sydney, in the state of New South Wales, Australia. It is located on the Northern Road between Penrith and Camden. It has a public school. Bringelly is also the name of a local hill.

== History ==
Bringelly was a name given to a district of Sydney in the early 19th century and later a parish of the County of Cumberland. The Parish of Bringelly also included the neighbouring suburbs of Greendale, Wallacia and Badgerys Creek. Robert Lowe was granted 1,000 acres (400 ha) in the parish of Bringelly in 1812 and is believed to be the first British settler in the area.

By 1818, most of the land had been granted and was being cleared for farms. The principal surgeon of New South Wales, D'Arcy Wentworth, received a grant in the area. Legend has it that The Wild Colonial Boy Bold Jack Donahue also used the suburb as a hideout and was eventually killed on Wentworth's property.

Another property of note is Kelvin, also known as The Retreat, which was built in 1820 by Thomas Laycock Jnr. A Georgian farmhouse, Kelvin is surrounded by a garden and is listed on the New South Wales State Heritage Register and the (now defunct) Register of the National Estate.

Luddenham Post Office opened on 1 January 1857 and was renamed Bringelly in December 1863. Bringelly Public School opened in 1878. Local government came to the area in 1906 with the creation of the Shire of Nepean, covering the area from Hoxton Park west to the Nepean River and south as far as Narellan. The Shire never thrived and when the New South Wales Government amalgamated a number of local councils in 1948, it was divided amongst Penrith, Liverpool, Campbelltown and Camden. In the process, the suburb of Bringelly was split between Liverpool and Camden Councils and remains so to this day.

Bringelly is adjacent to Badgerys Creek, site of the future Western Sydney Airport. The NSW Government planned to build a new commercial centre in Bringelly's north, which is intended to emerge as the city's third commercial centre behind Sydney and Parramatta. In March 2021, Premier Gladys Berejiklian announced that the new centre would be in honour of Sydney Harbour Bridge engineer Dr John Bradfield. The name was chosen by a committee following a call for public submissions in 2020. Berejiklian said that "The name Bradfield is synonymous with delivering game-changing infrastructure". In March 2023, the portion of Bringelly east of The Northern Road and north of Bringelly Road became part of the newly-gazetted suburb of Bradfield.

== Population ==
In the 2021 Census, there were 2,433 people in Bringelly. 71.0% of people were born in Australia. 65.4% of people spoke only English at home. Other languages spoken at home included Arabic 6.3% and Italian 4.7%. The most common responses for religion were Catholic 44.8%, No Religion 15.3% and Anglican 10.1%.

== Heritage listings ==
Bringelly has a number of heritage-listed sites, including:

- 30 The Retreat: Kelvin

== Notable residents ==
- Jack Donahue (1806–1830), Australian bushranger
- Thomas Laycock (1786 –1823), English soldier, explorer, and later businessman
- D'Arcy Wentworth (1762–1827), NSW Surgeon-general

== Transport ==
Bringelly has reasonably easy road access to Penrith and Camden via The Northern Road and to Liverpool and the M5 Motorway via Bringelly Road. The only public transport in the area consists of bus routes 855 and 856 operated by Transit Systems, connecting Bringelly to Liverpool via Rossmore, Austral, Hoxton Park and Cartwright.

== See also ==
- Bringelly Shale, unit of sedimentary rock named after the suburb
