= Greendale, New South Wales =

Greendale
- Suburb
- Interactive map of Greendale
- Country: Australia
- State: New South Wales
- City: Sydney
- LGA: City of Liverpool
- Location: 64 km (40 mi) from Sydney
- Established: 1848

Government
  - State electorate: Badgerys Creek
  - Federal division: Hume
- Elevation: 77 m (253 ft)

Population
  - Total: 314 (2021 census)
- Postcode: 2745
Suburbs around Greendale
Wallacia	Wallacia	Luddenham
Silverdale	Greendale	Bringelly
Werombi	Cobbitty	Bringelly

Greendale is a suburb of Sydney, in the state of New South Wales, Australia.

== History ==
Greendale was originally home to the Gundungurra people. The first British explorer to visit the area was botanist George Caley in 1800. A number of land grants were made in the area in 1811, one of which was to a Mary Birch who named her property Greendale. Another 1811 grant was made to Ellis Bent who was the colony's judge-advocate. Bents Basin, a recreational area on the Nepean River at Greendale is named after him.

The land was mainly used for wheat farming until 1861 when wheat rust infected the entire crop. The local farmers tried other crops unsuccessfully and gradually moved to other pastoral areas, effectively killing off the town that had grown up in the area. By 1929, the bakery, post office, school and churches had all closed down. A bushfire in 1939 destroyed virtually all the buildings left in the town. Today, even though the suburb has a population of a few hundred, there is no town centre.
