= Sydney Metro Western Sydney Airport =

Under construction rapid transit railway line

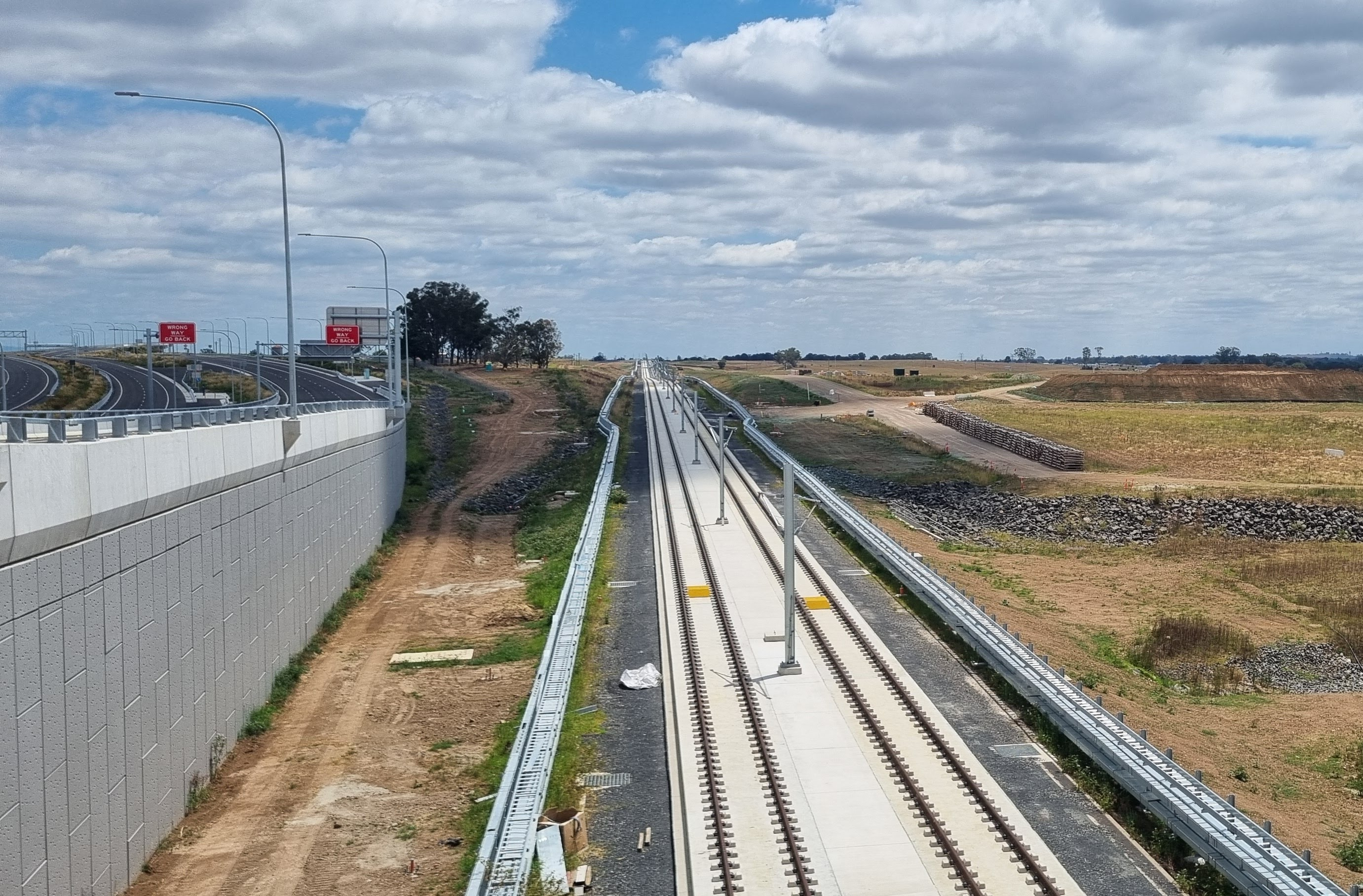
- View of the tracks in January 2026

Overview
- Status: Under construction
- Owner: Transport for NSW
- Locale: Sydney, New South Wales, Australia
- Stations: 6

Service
- Type: Rapid transit
- System: Sydney Metro
- Operator: RATP Dev
- Rolling stock: Siemens Inspiro

History
- Planned opening: December 2027 (planned)

Technical
- Line length: 23 km (14 mi)
- Track gauge: 1,435 mm (4 ft 8 1/2 in) standard gauge
- Electrification: 25 kV 50 Hz AC from overhead catenary
Route map
All Metro stations will
have wheelchair access

Sydney Metro Western Sydney Airport, previously known as Sydney Metro Greater West, is a rapid transit rail project currently under-construction in Greater Western Sydney. The project involves the construction of a 23-kilometre (14 mi) line as part of the Sydney Metro system. The line will operate between St Marys, where the line will connect to the Main Western railway line, and Bradfield via the Western Sydney Airport. It is intended to provide public transport for Western Sydney Airport.

Construction of the line started in December 2022 and was initially expected to be completed in late 2026 in time for the opening of the airport. However, this was later pushed back to December 2027, while reports suggest this risks being delayed further to 2028.

== Route ==
The line was constructed to provide public transport for the Western Sydney Airport.

The line will be 23-kilometre (14 mi) and have six stations.

- St Marys (interchange with T1 Western Line)
- Orchard Hills
- Luddenham
- Airport Business Park
- Airport Terminal
- Bradfield

The line is to run via twin tunnels between St Marys and Orchard Hills stations and between the Airport Terminal and Bradfield stations. Tunnel boring machines are being used from Orchard Hills and the Airport Business Park.

=== Possible extensions ===
The line will form Stage 1 of a proposed North South Rail Line, which would see the line extended north to Schofields on the Richmond railway line and proposed extension of the Metro North West & Bankstown Line, and south to Macarthur on the Main Southern railway line.

== History ==
=== Planning ===
In 2014, the federal government under prime minister Tony Abbott initially had no plans to build a rail line. However, it indicated provision for a railway line would be included in the development that may include preparing tunnels under the runway as part of the runway construction and preparing the underground space for a station. It was considered likely the rail connection to the airport would consist of an extension to the South West Rail Link from Leppington. In 2015, prime minister Malcolm Turnbull indicated that the airport would need both road and rail links to the Sydney CBD. In November 2015, a scoping study into rail investment to service Western Sydney and the Western Sydney Airport was announced. The study was jointly managed by the NSW and the Commonwealth governments. A discussion paper, released in September 2016, proposed various options that could provide a rail link to the airport, listed below:

Option	Mode
Extension of the South West Rail Link from Leppington	Suburban rail
Line to the Metro North West & Bankstown Line at Rouse Hill	Metro
Extension of the Sydney Metro City & Southwest from Bankstown via Liverpool	Metro
Line to the Main Western railway line at St Marys	Suburban rail
New express line to the Sydney CBD via Parramatta	Metro
Line between Macarthur and Schofields via WSA and St Marys	Metro

The final report, released in March 2018, proposed that two lines would ultimately service the airport: a "North-South Link" from Schofields to Macarthur and an "East-West Link" from Parramatta to the "Badgerys Creek Aerotropolis", an area south of the airport. The East-West Link would likely form an extension of the already-announced Sydney Metro West. An extension of the South West Rail Link to the Badgerys Creek Aerotropolis was also proposed. Interchanging with the North-South Link or East-West Link would be required to access the airport itself.

Later in March 2018, the federal and state governments signed the Western Sydney City Deal and announced the development of stage 1 of the North South Rail Link as part of the deal.

Between 2019 and May 2020, the stage 1 of the North-South Link is referred to as "Sydney Metro Greater West" by the Sydney Metro agency. The project update on 1 June 2020 confirmed the name of the line to be "Sydney Metro – Western Sydney Airport".

Prior to June 2020, the only stations proposed were at St Marys, Western Sydney Airport and Aerotropolis. The proposed six stations of Stage 1 were confirmed in June 2020 and the exact locations of the stations were confirmed in September 2020.

In October 2020, the project's Environmental Impact Statement (EIS) was released to the public for exhibition. Since the work would be carried out within the airport boundary, federal planning approval was also required. State planning approval was granted in July 2021, and federal planning approval was granted in September 2021.

=== Funding ===
In the 2019–2020 federal budget in April 2019, the federal government announced a contribution of $3.5 billion to deliver stage 1 of the rail link. This funding also includes $50 million towards the business case process for the North-South Rail Link and $61 million for the Elizabeth Drive overpass.

In the 2019–2020 New South Wales state budget in June 2019, the state government announced an investment of $2.0 billion to commence the construction of stage 1 for the next four years.

In June 2020, the federal and state governments announced a further $3.5 billion contribution to push the construction date earlier to late 2020. Designs were modified to include an additional six kilometres of tunnelling. At the time, the project had a price tag of A$11 billion.

=== Construction ===
In addition to the funding announcement in June 2020, it was also announced that preliminary works would begin that year and major works would begin in 2021.

In March 2021, three consortia (Acciona, a joint venture of John Holland and Gamuda, CPB and Ghella) were shortlisted to deliver tunnelling works for the project. The station box and tunnelling contract was awarded to CPB and Ghella in December 2021. In September 2023, a tunnel boring machine, one of four tunnel boring machines, had completed the first 1.26 km section of its 5.5 km tunnel. Tunnelling is expected to be complete in late 2024, with track laying and station fitout to occur afterwards.

A second major contract for surface and civil alignment works was awarded to CPB and United Infrastructure in March 2022.

A third major contract was the Stations, Systems, Trains, Operations and Maintenance (SSTOM) package for the construction of the stations and operation of the line. In October 2021, three consortia were shortlisted:

- Bradfield Metro, comprising John Laing, Keolis Downer, FCC Construction Australia and Hitachi Rail STS
- Parklife Metro, comprising Plenary Group, Webuild, RATP Dev and four Siemens Mobility companies
- WestGo, comprising CIMIC Group (Pacific Partnerships, CPB, UGL Engineering and UGL Rail), two Acciona companies, DIF Management Australia, ComfortDelGro Transit and Coleman Rail Pty Ltd

The SSTOM package was awarded to Parklife Metro in December 2022.

As of late 2025, station platforms and buildings are currently under construction, with track laying in tunnels taking place at the same time. However, it was also reported that operations may not commence until April 2027.

In 2025, a dispute arose between Sydney Metro and the Parklife Metro consortium over claims relating to delays, scope changes and disruptions. Parklife Metro submitted claims totalling up to $2.2 billion, including costs associated with additional works and project delays, and sought an extension to the project completion date. In 2026, the dispute escalated, with Webuild, a member of the consortium, reducing construction activity while negotiations continued, increasing the risk of further delays to the opening date. Webuild was also involved in the removal of subcontractor Future Form following a probity investigation into subcontracting arrangements. In September 2025, Sydney Metro commissioned an investigation into the activities of Future Form Civil Pty Ltd and some of its contractors. The report was referred to NSW Police for a criminal investigation. The project also experienced delays affecting station commissioning, the line's power supply, and delivery of the planned 12 Siemens Mobility metro trains. As of January 2026, the line was planned to open by late December 2027, though Sydney Metro documents warned of an "elevated" risk to this target, raising the prospect of the opening slipping into 2028.

Due to delays in the metro line completion, in January 2026, the New South Wales government announced that a free interim bus service would run between St Marys and the airport until the metro line opens in 2027.

The Line—similar to the M1—will utilise Platform Screen Doors at all stations such as Luddenham depicted above, allowing for safer boarding and alighting.

== Operations ==
Being awarded the SSTOM package, Parklife Metro will operate and maintain the line for 15 years after it becomes operational.

The Sydney Metro Trains Facility and the Operations Control Centre will be located at Orchard Hills, and services facilities will be located at Claremont Meadows and Bringelly.

=== Rolling stock ===
Siemens Mobility will deliver 12 automated 3-car Inspiro HC trains to run on the line. Additional features of the new rolling stock were announced in January 2025.
