= Bradfield metro station =

Proposed railway station in Sydney, Australia

Bradfield
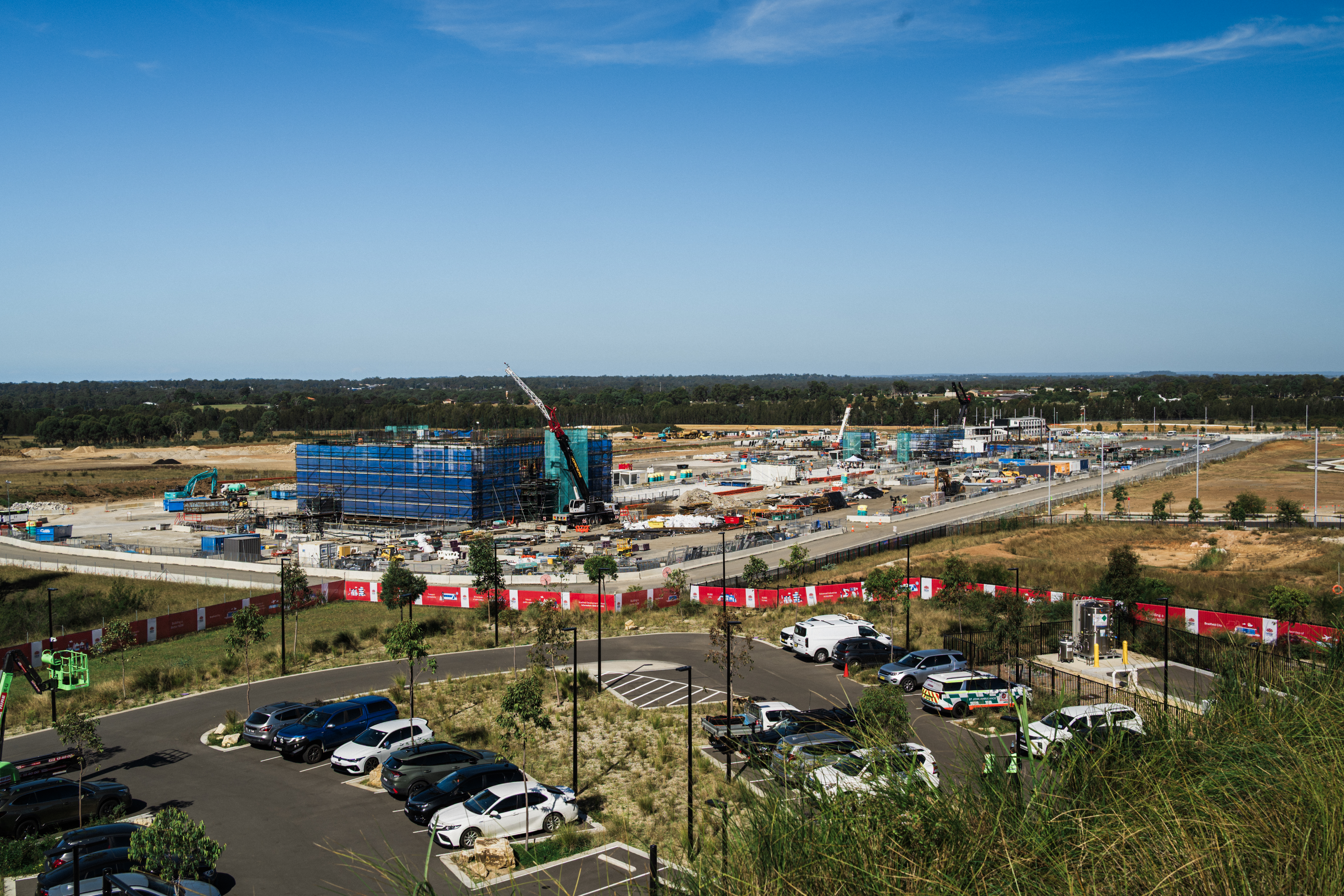
- Construction site during a community day in 2026

General information
- Location: Bradfield, New South Wales; Australia
- Coordinates: 33°55′29.0″S 150°44′7.6″E
- Owner: Transport Asset Manager of New South Wales
- Line: Western Sydney Airport
- Platforms: 2
- Tracks: 2

Construction
- Structure type: Underground
- Accessible: Yes

Other information
- Status: Under construction

History
- Opened: 2027 (planned)
- Former names: Aerotropolis (during planning)

Services
Preceding station	Sydney Metro	Following station
Airport Terminal towards St Marys	Sydney Metro Western Sydney Airport	Terminus
Location

Bradfield metro station is a Sydney Metro station currently under construction. Located on the Western Sydney Airport line, it will serve the suburb of Bradfield. It will be the southern terminus of the line upon its opening in 2027.

Prior to mid-2024, the planning name of the proposed station was Aerotropolis railway station. In December 2023, there was a proposal to formalise the station name as Bradfield, following the gazettal of the suburb of Bradfield in March that year. The naming proposal was approved by the Geographical Names Board of New South Wales and the new name was gazetted on 10 May 2024. Soon after, government documents and announcements referred to the station as the new name.

== Connections ==
In August 2025, two proposed bus routes that would service Bradfield were announced:

- 845: Campbelltown to WSI via Oran Park and Bradfield
- 860: Liverpool to WSI via Leppington and Bradfield

In March 2026, it was announced that the bus route services would begin on 5 July 2026.
