= St Pauls Catholic College =

Location
- 198 Old Prospect Road, Greystanes, western Sydney, New South Wales; Australia; 33°49′08″S 150°57′06″E

Information
- Former names: St Simon Stock School; Newman High School; Newman College for Boys
- Type: Independent single-sex secondary day school
- Motto: Many Gifts – One Community
- Denomination: Roman Catholic
- Patron saint: Saint Paul
- Established: 1958; 68 years ago (as St Simon Stock School)
- Sister school: Our Lady of Mercy College, Parramatta
- Educational authority: New South Wales Department of Education
- Oversight: Catholic Education Office, Diocese of Parramatta
- Principal: Robert (Rob) Nastasi
- Staff: 124
- Teaching staff: 89
- Year: 7-12
- Gender: Boys
- Enrollment: 1024 (2021)
- Houses: Mackillop, Florey, Churchill, Greenway, Bennelong
- Colours: Red, navy blue and gold
- Affiliations: Association of Independent Schools of NSW, Catholic Secondary Schools of NSW
- Website: www.stpaulsgreystanes.catholic.edu.au

St Pauls Catholic College, (colloquially as St Pauls), is an independent, fee-paying, Roman Catholic single-sex school for boys, located in Greystanes, a western suburb of Sydney, New South Wales. The college is located on Old Prospect Rd. The college caters for students in years 7-12, with over 1,000 students and over 120 teachers.

The college is noted in honour of the Christian patron, St Paul. It was originally named St Simon Stock High School and Newman High School. It is behind the OLQP Parish in Greystanes and next to OLQP Primary School. Its vicinity becomes the host of the annual Maltese Festival around September.

== History ==
St Paul's Catholic College was founded in 1958, built by Frank Cefai. It was commonly referred to as the new Catholic School in the district of Pendle Hill. It was originally named St Simon Stock School.

The school took its motto Esto Vir, which means "Be a Man".

Over the years, the school took on a new name and motto. The 19th-Century English convert and thinker John Henry Newman was the inspiration for the new name and the new motto was "Heart speaks to Heart". The school's library and resource centre adopted his name and named it 'John Henry Newman Library'.

In 1999, the school was renamed again to St Paul's. The new motto for St Paul's is "Many Gifts – One Community".

== See also ==
- List of Catholic schools in New South Wales
- Catholic education in Australia
