= Penola Catholic College, Emu Plains =

Penola Catholic College, Emu Plains (Previously McCarthy Catholic College Emu Plains)

Location
- Emu Plains, Western Sydney, New South Wales; Australia; 33°44′32″S 150°40′44″E

Information
- School type: Independent co-educational secondary day school
- Motto: Compassion, Courage, Hope and Integrity
- Denomination: Roman Catholic
- Established: 1986; 40 years ago
- Oversight: Catholic Education Office, Diocese of Parramatta
- Principal: Peta Sparkes
- Years: 7–12
- Website: www.penolaemuplains.catholic.edu.au

Penola Catholic College, Emu Plains (formerly McCarthy Catholic College Emu Plains) is an independent Roman Catholic co-educational secondary day school located in the Western Sydney suburb of Emu Plains, New South Wales, Australia.

== Overview ==
Penola Catholic College is a Catholic co-educational school for students from Year 7 to Year 12 which currently incorporates a traditional Higher School Certificate pathway for Years 11 and 12.

== See also ==
- Catholic Education in the Diocese of Parramatta
- List of Catholic schools in New South Wales
- Catholic education in Australia
