= List of Catholic schools in New South Wales =

Below is list of Catholic schools in the state of New South Wales. It is correct as of June 2023.

== Systemic primary schools ==
School	Suburb or town	LGA	Years	M/F/co-ed	Category	Founded
All Hallows Catholic Primary	Five Dock	Canada Bay	K–6	Co-ed	Systemic	1919
All Hallows Catholic Primary School	Gulgong	Mid-Western	K–6	Co-ed	Systemic	1883
All Saints Catholic Primary School	Tumbarumba	Ku-ring-gai	K–6	Co-ed	Systemic	1955
The Assumption Catholic Primary School	Bathurst	Bathurst	K–6	Co-ed	Systemic	1952
Bethany Catholic Primary School	Glenmore Park	Penrith	K–6	Co-ed	Systemic	1996
Blessed Sacrament Catholic Primary School	Clifton Gardens	Mosman	K–6	Co-ed	Systemic	1950
Cathedral Catholic Primary School	Bathurst	Bathurst	K–6	Co-ed	Systemic	1842
Catherine McAuley Catholic Primary School	Orange	Orange	K–6	Co-ed	Systemic	2012
Chisholm Catholic Primary School	Bligh Park	Hawkesbury	K–6	Co-ed	Systemic	1994
Christ the King Catholic Primary School – Bass Hill	Yagoona	Canterbury-Bankstown	K–6	Co-ed	Systemic	1957
Christ the King Catholic Primary School	North Rocks	Parramatta	K–6	Co-ed	Systemic	1973
Corpus Christi Catholic Primary School	Cranebrook	Penrith	K–6	Co-ed	Systemic	1987
Corpus Christi Catholic Primary School	St Ives	Ku-ring-gai	K–6	Co-ed	Systemic	1954
Corpus Christi Catholic Primary School	Waratah	Newcastle	K–6	Co-ed	Systemic	1933
Father John Therry Catholic Primary School	Balmain	Inner West	K–6	Co-ed	Systemic	1995
Galilee Catholic Primary School	Bondi Beach	Waverley	K–6	Co-ed	Systemic	2002
Good Samaritan Catholic Primary School	Fairy Meadow	Wollongong	K–6	Co-ed	Systemic	2012
Good Shepherd Catholic Primary School	Hoxton Park	Liverpool	K–6	Co-ed	Systemic	1997
Good Shepherd Catholic Primary School	Plumpton	Blacktown	K–6	Co-ed	Systemic	1979
Henschke Primary School	Wagga Wagga	Wagga Wagga	K–6	Co-ed	Systemic	1952
Holy Cross Catholic Primary School	Glendale	Lake Macquarie	K–6	Co-ed	Systemic	1957
Holy Cross Catholic Primary School	Glenwood	Blacktown	K–6	Co-ed	Systemic	1999
Holy Cross Catholic Primary School	Helensburgh	Wollongong	K–6	Co-ed	Systemic	1900
Holy Cross Catholic Primary School	Kincumber	Central Coast	K–6	Co-ed	Systemic	1991
Holy Cross Catholic Primary School	Woollahra	Woollahra	K–6	Co-ed	Systemic	1906
Holy Family Catholic Primary School	Emerton	Blacktown	K–6	Co-ed	Systemic	2004
Holy Family Catholic Primary School	Granville East	Cumberland	K–6	Co-ed	Systemic	1938
Holy Family Catholic Primary School	Ingleburn	Campbelltown	K–6	Co-ed	Systemic	1982
Holy Family Catholic Primary School	Kelso	Bathurst	K–6	Co-ed	Systemic	1979
Holy Family Catholic Primary School	Lindfield	Ku-ring-gai	K–6	Co-ed	Systemic	1927
Holy Family Catholic Primary School	Luddenham	Penrith	K–6	Co-ed	Systemic	1990
Holy Family Catholic Primary School	Menai	Sutherland	K–6	Co-ed	Systemic	1986
Holy Family Catholic Primary School	Merewether Beach	Newcastle	K–6	Co-ed	Systemic	1956
Holy Family Catholic Primary School	Parkes	Parkes Shire	K–6	Co-ed	Systemic	1971
Holy Family Catholic Primary School	Skennars Head	Ballina	K–6	Co-ed	Systemic	1997
Holy Innocents' Primary School	Croydon	Inner West	K–6	Co-ed	Systemic	1927
Holy Name Primary School	Forster	MidCoast Council	K–6	Co-ed	Systemic	1961
Holy Saviour School	Greenacre	Canterbury-Bankstown	K–6	Co-ed	Melkite Greek Catholic	2000
Holy Spirit Catholic Primary School	Carnes Hill	Liverpool	K–6	Co-ed	Systemic	2002
Holy Spirit Catholic Primary School	Kurri Kurri	Cessnock	K–6	Co-ed	Systemic	1908
Holy Spirit Catholic Primary School	Lavington	Albury	K–6	Co-ed	Systemic	1971
Holy Spirit Catholic Primary School	North Ryde	Ryde	K–6	Co-ed	Systemic	1958
Holy Spirit Catholic Primary School	St Clair	Penrith	K–6	Co-ed	Systemic	1985
Holy Spirit Infants School	Abermain	Cessnock	K–2	Co-ed	Systemic	1908
Holy Trinity Primary School	Granville	Cumberland	K–6	Co-ed	Systemic	1885
Holy Trinity West Wagga	Wagga Wagga	Wagga Wagga	K–6	Co-ed	Systemic	1970
Immaculate Heart of Mary Catholic Primary School	Sefton	Cumberland	K–6	Co-ed	Systemic	1948
John The Baptist Primary School	Bonnyrigg	Fairfield	K–6	Co-ed	Systemic	1989
Maria Regina Catholic Primary School	Avalon Beach	Northern Beaches	K–6	Co-ed	Systemic	1959
Marion Catholic Primary School	Horsley Park	Fairfield	K–6	Co-ed	Systemic	1982
Mary Help of Christians Primary School Sawtell	Toormina	Coffs Harbour	K–6	Co-ed	Systemic	1980
Mary Immaculate Catholic Primary School	Bossley Park	Fairfield	K–6	Co-ed	Systemic	1985
Mary Immaculate Catholic Primary School (formerly St Mary's Catholic Primary School)	Eagle Vale	Campbelltown	K–6	Co-ed	Systemic	1986
Mary Immaculate Catholic Primary School	Quakers Hill	Blacktown	K–6	Co-ed	Systemic	1987
Mater Dei Primary School	Blakehurst	Georges River	K–6	Co-ed	Systemic	1966
Mater Dei Primary School	Wagga Wagga	Wagga Wagga	K–6	Co-ed	Systemic	1990
McAuley Primary School	Rose Bay	Woollahra	K–6	Co-ed	Systemic	1967
Mother Teresa Primary School	Westmead	Cumberland	K–6	Co-ed	Systemic	2012
Mount Carmel School	Yass	Yass Valley	K–6	Co-ed	Systemic	1917
Mount St John Primary School	Dorrigo	Bellingen Shire	K–6	Co-ed	Systemic	1924
Mount St Patrick Primary School	Murwillumbah	Tweed Shire	K–6	Co-ed	Systemic	1904
Nazareth Catholic Primary School	Shellharbour City Centre	Shellharbour	K–6	Co-ed	Systemic	2001
Our Lady Help of Christians Catholic Primary School	Epping	Parramatta	K–6	Co-ed	Systemic	1908
Our Lady Help of Christians Catholic Primary School	Rosemeadow	Campbelltown	K–6	Co-ed	Systemic	1989
Our Lady Help of Christians Primary School	Lismore South	Lismore	K–6	Co-ed	Systemic	1917
Our Lady of Dolours Catholic Primary School	Chatswood	Willoughby	K–6	Co-ed	Systemic	1896
Our Lady of Fatima School	Caringbah	Sutherland	K–6	Co-ed	Systemic	1950
Our Lady of Fatima School	Kingsgrove	Canterbury-Bankstown	K–6	Co-ed	Systemic	1951
Our Lady of Good Counsel Catholic Primary School	Forestville	Northern Beaches	K–6	Co-ed	Systemic	1962
Our Lady of Lourdes Primary School	Baulkham Hills	The Hills	K–6	Co-ed	Systemic	1963
Our Lady of Lourdes Primary School	Earlwood	Canterbury-Bankstown	K–6	Co-ed	Systemic	1923
Our Lady of Lourdes Primary School	Seven Hills	Parramatta	K–6	Co-ed	Systemic	1963
Our Lady of Lourdes Primary School	Tarro	Newcastle	K–6	Co-ed	Systemic	1944
Our Lady of Mount Carmel Primary School	Bonnyrigg	Fairfield	K–6	Co-ed	Systemic	1952
Our Lady of Mount Carmel Primary School	Waterloo	Sydney	K–6	Co-ed	Systemic	1858
Our Lady of Mount Carmel Primary School	Wentworthville	Parramatta	K–6	Co-ed	Systemic	1920
Our Lady of Perpetual Succour Catholic Primary School	West Pymble	Ku-ring-gai	K–6	Co-ed	Systemic	1962
Our Lady of the Angels Primary School	Kellyville	The Hills	K–6	Co-ed	Systemic	2010
Our Lady of The Assumption Catholic Primary School	North Strathfield	Strathfield	K–6	Co-ed	Systemic	2015
Our Lady of The Nativity Primary School	Lawson	Blue Mountains	K–6	Co-ed	Systemic	1929
Our Lady of The Rosary Catholic Primary School	Fairfield	Fairfield	K–6	Co-ed	Systemic	1928
Our Lady of The Rosary Catholic Primary School	Kellyville	The Hills	K–6	Co-ed	Systemic	1979
Our Lady of The Rosary Catholic Primary School	Kensington	Randwick	K–6	Co-ed	Systemic	1907
Our Lady of The Rosary Catholic Primary School	Shelly Beach	Central Coast	K–6	Co-ed	Systemic	1952
Our Lady of The Rosary Catholic Primary School	St Marys	Penrith	K–6	Co-ed	Systemic	1880
Our Lady of The Rosary Catholic Primary School	Waitara	Hornsby	K–6	Co-ed	Systemic	1898
Our Lady of The Rosary Catholic Primary School	Wyoming	Central Coast	K–6	Co-ed	Systemic	1977
Our Lady of The Sacred Heart School	Randwick	Randwick	K–6	Co-ed	Systemic	1881
Our Lady of The Way Primary School	Emu Plains	Penrith	K–6	Co-ed	Systemic	1979
Our Lady of Victories Primary School	Shortland	Newcastle	K–6	Co-ed	Systemic	1957
Our Lady Queen of Peace Primary School	Gladesville	Ryde	K–6	Co-ed	Systemic	1925
Our Lady Queen of Peace Primary School	Greystanes	Cumberland	K–6	Co-ed	Systemic	1957
Our Lady Star of the Sea Catholic Primary School	Miranda	Sutherland	K–6	Co-ed	Systemic	1950
Our Lady Star of The Sea Catholic Primary School	Terrigal	Central Coast	K–6	Co-ed	Systemic	1979
Prouille Catholic Primary School	Wahroonga	Ku-ring-gai	K–6	Co-ed	Systemic	1950
Redfern Jarjum College	Redfern	Sydney	K–6	Co-ed	Jesuit	2010
Regina Coeli Catholic Primary School	Beverly Hills	Georges River	K–6	Co-ed	Systemic	1947
Rosary Park Catholic School	Branxton	Hunter Region	K–6	Co-ed	Systemic	2011
Sacred Heart Catholic Primary School	Boggabri	Gunnedah	K–6	Co-ed	Systemic	1911
Sacred Heart Catholic Primary School	Broken Hill	City of Broken Hill	K–6	Co-ed	Systemic	1988
Sacred Heart Catholic Primary School	Cabramatta	Fairfield	K–6	Co-ed	Systemic	193
Sacred Heart Catholic Primary School	Coolah	Warrumbungle Shire	K–6	Co-ed	Systemic	1921
Sacred Heart Catholic Primary School, Kooringal	Wagga Wagga	Wagga Wagga	K–6	Co-ed	Systemic	????
Sacred Heart Catholic Primary School	Matraville	Randwick	K–6	Co-ed	Systemic	1949
Sacred Heart Catholic Primary School	Mona Vale	Northern Beaches	K–6	Co-ed	Systemic	1960
Sacred Heart Catholic Primary School	Mosman	Mosman	K–6	Co-ed	Systemic	1900
Sacred Heart Catholic Primary School	Mount Druitt South	Blacktown	K–6	Co-ed	Systemic	1983
Sacred Heart Catholic Primary School	Pymble	Ku-ring-gai	K–6	Co-ed	Systemic	1983
Sacred Heart Catholic Primary School	Tocumwal	Berrigan Shire	K–6	Co-ed	Systemic	1906
Sacred Heart Catholic Primary School	Villawood	Fairfield	K–6	Co-ed	Systemic	1965
Sacred Heart Catholic Primary School	Westmead	Cumberland	K–6	Co-ed	Systemic	1956
Sts Peter and Paul Catholic Primary School	Kiama	Kiama	K–6	Co-ed	Systemic	1908
Sts Peter and Paul's Primary School	Goulburn	Goulburn Mulwaree	K–6	Co-ed	Systemic	1986
St Agatha's Catholic Primary School	Pennant Hills	Hornsby	K–6	Co-ed	Systemic	1954
St Agnes' Catholic Primary School	Port Macquarie	Port Macquarie-Hastings	K–6	Co-ed	Systemic	1982
St Aidan's Catholic Primary School	Maroubra Junction	Randwick	K–6	Co-ed	Systemic	1915
St Aidan's Catholic Primary School	Rooty Hill	Blacktown	K–6	Co-ed	Systemic	1907
St Aloysius' Catholic Primary School	Chisholm	Maitland	K–6	Co-ed	Systemic	2015
St Aloysius' Catholic Primary School	Cronulla	Sutherland	K–6	Co-ed	Systemic	1917
St Ambrose Catholic Primary School	Concord West	Canada Bay	K–6	Co-ed	Systemic	1924
St Ambrose Catholic Primary School	Pottsville	Tweed Shire	K–6	Co-ed	Systemic	2015
St Andrew's Catholic Primary School	Malabar	Randwick	K–6	Co-ed	Systemic	1916
St Andrews Catholic Primary School	Marayong	Blacktown	K–6	Co-ed	Systemic	1963
St Angela's Primary School	Castle Hill	The Hills	K–6	Co-ed	Systemic	2001
St Anne's Catholic Primary School, North Albury	Lavington	Albury	K–6	Co-ed	Systemic	1958
St Anne's Catholic Primary School	Strathfield South	Strathfield	K–6	Co-ed	Systemic	1957
St Anthony's Catholic Primary School	Clovelly	Randwick	K–6	Co-ed	Systemic	1918
St Anthony's Catholic Primary School	Girraween	Cumberland	K–6	Co-ed	Systemic	1950
St Anthony's Catholic Primary School	Kingscliff	Tweed Shire	K–6	Co-ed	Systemic	1968
St Anthony's Catholic Primary School	Marsfield	Ryde	K–6	Co-ed	Systemic	1936
St Anthony's Catholic Primary School	Picton	Wollondilly Shire	K–6	Co-ed	Systemic	1880
St Augustine's Parish Primary School	Narromine	Narromine Shire	K–6	Co-ed	Systemic	1904
St Augustine's Primary School	Coffs Harbour	Coffs Harbour	K–6	Co-ed	Systemic	1913
St Bede's Primary School	Braidwood	Queanbeyan–Palerang	K–6	Co-ed	Systemic	1859
St Benedict's Primary School	Edgeworth	Lake Macquarie	K–6	Co-ed	Systemic	1962
St Bernadette's Primary School	Castle Hill	The Hills	K–6	Co-ed	Systemic	1956
St Bernadette's Primary School	Dundas Valley	Parramatta	K–6	Co-ed	Systemic	1958
St Bernadette's Primary School	Lalor Park	Blacktown	K–6	Co-ed	Systemic	1960
St Bernard's Catholic Primary School, Batemans Bay	Batehaven	Eurobodalla	K–6	Co-ed	Systemic	1982
St Bernard's Catholic Primary School	Berowra Heights	Hornsby	K–6	Co-ed	Systemic	1971
St Bernard's Catholic Primary School	Botany	Bayside	K–6	Co-ed	Systemic	1885
St Brendan's Catholic Primary School	Annandale	Inner West	K–6	Co-ed	Systemic	1888
St Brendan's Catholic Primary School	Bankstown	Canterbury-Bankstown	K–6	Co-ed	Systemic	1952
St Brendan's Catholic Primary School	Ganmain	Coolamon Shire	K–6	Co-ed	Systemic	1906
St Brendan's Catholic Primary School	Lake Munmorah	Central Coast	K–6	Co-ed	Systemic	1989
St Brigid's Catholic Primary School	Coogee	Randwick	K–6	Co-ed	Systemic	1923
St Brigid's Catholic Primary School	Coonamble	Coonamble Shire	K–6	Co-ed	Systemic	1883
St Brigid's Catholic Primary School	Gwynneville	Wollongong	K–6	Co-ed	Systemic	1951
St Brigid's Catholic Primary School	Kyogle	Kyogle Council	K–6	Co-ed	Systemic	1914
St Brigid's Catholic Primary School	Marrickville	Inner West	K–6	Co-ed	Systemic	1887
St Brigid's Catholic Primary School	Raymond Terrace	Port Stephens	K–6	Co-ed	Systemic	1890
St Canice's Primary School	Katoomba	Blue Mountains	K–6	Co-ed	Systemic	1901
St Carthage's Primary School	Lismore	Lismore	K–6	Co-ed	Systemic	1886
St Catherine Labouré Primary School	Gymea	Sutherland	K–6	Co-ed	Systemic	1954
St Catherine of Siena Primary School	Prestons	Liverpool	K–6	Co-ed	Systemic	1999
St Cecilia's Catholic Primary School	Balgowlah	Northern Beaches	K–6	Co-ed	Systemic	1930
St Cecilia's Catholic Primary School	Wyong	Central Coast	K–6	Co-ed	Systemic	1916
St Charles' Catholic Primary School	Ryde	Ryde	K–6	Co-ed	Systemic	1858
St Charles' Catholic Primary School	Waverley	Waverley	K–6	Co-ed	Systemic	1854
St Christopher's Catholic Primary School	Holsworthy	Liverpool	K–6	Co-ed	Systemic	2002
St Christopher's Catholic Primary School	Panania	Canterbury-Bankstown	K–6	Co-ed	Systemic	1955
St Clare's Catholic Primary School	Narellan Vale	Camden	K–6	Co-ed	Systemic	1994
St Columba's Catholic Primary School	Adamstown	Newcastle	K–6	Co-ed	Systemic	1890s
St Columba's Catholic Primary School	Leichhardt North	Inner West	K–6	Co-ed	Systemic	1898
St Columba's Catholic Primary School	Yeoval	Cabonne Council	K–6	Co-ed	Systemic	????
St Columban's Primary School	Mayfield	Newcastle	K–6	Co-ed	Systemic	1917
St Columbkille's Catholic Parish Primary School	Corrimal	Wollongong	K–6	Co-ed	Systemic	1905
St Declan's Primary School	Penshurst	Georges River	K–6	Co-ed	Systemic	1907
St Dominic Savio School	Rockdale	Bayside	K–6	Co-ed	Society of St. Pius X	1984
St Edward's Primary School	Canowindra	Cabonne Council	K–6	Co-ed	Systemic	????
St Edward's Primary School	South Tamworth	Tamworth	K–6	Co-ed	Systemic	1954
St Felix Catholic Primary School	Bankstown	Canterbury-Bankstown	K–6	Co-ed	Systemic	1886
St Fiacre's Primary School	Leichhardt	Inner West	K–6	Co-ed	Systemic	1894
St Finbar's Primary School	Glenbrook	Blue Mountains	K–6	Co-ed	Systemic	1954
St Finbar's Primary School	Sans Souci	Bayside	K–6	Co-ed	Systemic	1926
St Finbarr's Primary School	Byron Bay	Byron	K–6	Co-ed	Systemic	1916
St Francis De Sales' Primary School	Woolooware	Sutherland	K–6	Co-ed	Systemic	1963
St Francis of Assisi Catholic Primary School	Warrawong	Wollongong	K–6	Co-ed	Systemic	1960
St Francis of Assisi Primary School	Glendenning	Blacktown	K–6	Co-ed	Systemic	1991
St Francis of Assisi Regional Primary School	Paddington	Sydney	K–6	Co-ed	Systemic	2000
St Francis Xavier Catholic Primary School, Ashbury	Croydon Park	Canterbury-Bankstown	K–6	Co-ed	Systemic	1930
St Francis Xavier Catholic Primary School	Ballina	Ballina	K–6	Co-ed	Systemic	1982
St Francis Xavier Catholic Primary School	Woolgoolga	Coffs Harbour	K–6	Co-ed	Systemic	1994
St Francis Xavier's Catholic Primary School	Arncliffe	Bayside	K–6	Co-ed	Systemic	1911
St Francis Xavier's Catholic Primary School	Belmont	Lake Macquarie	K–6	Co-ed	Systemic	1950
St Francis Xavier's Catholic Primary School	Lake Cargelligo	Lachlan Shire	K–6	Co-ed	Systemic	1929
St Francis Xavier's Catholic Primary School	Lurnea	Liverpool	K–6	Co-ed	Systemic	????
St Francis Xavier's Catholic Primary School	Narrabri	Narrabri Shire	K–6	Co-ed	Systemic	1882
St Gabriel's Catholic Primary School	Bexley	Bayside	K–6	Co-ed	Systemic	1939
St Gerard's Catholic Primary School	Carlingford	Parramatta	K–6	Co-ed	Systemic	1964
St Gertrude's Catholic Primary School	Smithfield	Fairfield	K–6	Co-ed	Systemic	1952
St Gregory's Primary School	Queanbeyan	Queanbeyan–Palerang	K–6	Co-ed	Systemic	1850
St Ignatius' Primary School	Bourke	Bourke Shire	K–6	Co-ed	Systemic	1870s
St James' Primary School	Banora Point	Tweed Shire	K–6	Co-ed	Systemic	1917
St James' Primary School	Kotara South	Lake Macquarie	K–6	Co-ed	Systemic	1961
St James' Primary School	Muswellbrook	Muswellbrook Shire	K–6	Co-ed	Systemic	1862
St James' Primary School	Yamba	Clarence Valley Council	K–6	Co-ed	Systemic	1997
St Jerome's School	Punchbowl	Canterbury-Bankstown	K–6	Co-ed	Systemic	1933
St Joachim's Catholic Primary School	Lidcombe	Cumberland	K–6	Co-ed	Systemic	1885
St Joan of Arc Catholic Primary School	Haberfield	Inner West	K–6	Co-ed	Systemic	1910
St John Bosco Catholic Primary School	Engadine	Sutherland	K–6	Co-ed	Systemic	1959
St John Fisher Catholic Primary School	Tumbi Umbi	Central Coast	K–6	Co-ed	Systemic	1988
St John The Apostle Catholic Primary School	Narraweena	Northern Beaches	K–6	Co-ed	Systemic	1962
St John The Baptist Catholic Primary School	Freshwater	Northern Beaches	K–6	Co-ed	Systemic	1921
St John The Baptist Catholic Primary School	Woy Woy South	Central Coast	K–6	Co-ed	Systemic	1922
St John The Baptist Primary School	Maitland	Maitland	K–6	Co-ed	Systemic	1856
St John The Evangelist Catholic Primary School	Campbelltown	Campbelltown	K–6	Co-ed	Systemic	1849
St John Vianney's Primary School	Doonside	Blacktown	K–6	Co-ed	Systemic	1986
St John Vianney's Primary School	Greenacre	Canterbury-Bankstown	K–6	Co-ed	Systemic	1961
St John Vianney's Primary School	Morisset	Lake Macquarie	K–6	Co-ed	Systemic	1962
St John's Catholic Primary School	Auburn	Cumberland	K–6	Co-ed	Systemic	1893
St John's Catholic Primary School	Baradine	Warrumbungle Shire	K–6	Co-ed	Systemic	1926
St John's Catholic Primary School	Cobar	Cobar Shire	K–6	Co-ed	Systemic	1884
St John's Catholic Primary School	Dapto	Wollongong	K–6	Co-ed	Systemic	1839
St John's Catholic Primary School	Dubbo	Dubbo	K–6	Co-ed	Systemic	1969
St John's Catholic Primary School	Lambton	Newcastle	K–6	Co-ed	Systemic	1883
St John's Catholic Primary School	Mullumbimby	Byron	K–6	Co-ed	Systemic	1910
St John's Catholic Primary School	Riverstone	Blacktown	K–6	Co-ed	Systemic	1950
St John's Catholic Primary School	Trangie	Narromine Shire	K–6	Co-ed	Systemic	1914
St Joseph The Worker School	Auburn	Cumberland	K–6	Co-ed	Systemic	1962
St Joseph's Catholic Primary School	Adelong	Snowy Valleys Council	K–6	Co-ed	Systemic	1884
St Joseph's Catholic Primary School	Alstonville	Ballina	K–6	Co-ed	Systemic	1919
St Joseph's Catholic Primary School	Balranald	Balranald Shire	K–6	Co-ed	Systemic	????
St Joseph's Catholic Primary School	Barraba	Tamworth	K–6	Co-ed	Systemic	1910
St Joseph's Catholic Primary School	Belmore	Canterbury-Bankstown	K–6	Co-ed	Systemic	1921
St Joseph's Catholic Primary School (formerly St Joseph's Central School)	Blayney	Blayney Shire	K–6	Co-ed	Systemic	1881
St Joseph's Catholic Primary School	Bombala	Snowy Monaro	K–6	Co-ed	Systemic	1888
St Joseph's Catholic Primary School	Boorowa	Hilltops Council	K–6	Co-ed	Systemic	1858
St Joseph's Catholic Primary School	Bulahdelah	MidCoast Council	K–6	Co-ed	Systemic	1955
St Joseph's Catholic Primary School	Bulli	Wollongong	K–6	Co-ed	Systemic	1882
St Joseph's Catholic Primary School	Charlestown	Lake Macquarie	K—6	Co-ed	Systemic	1927
St Joseph's Catholic Primary School	Como	Sutherland	K–6	Co-ed	Systemic	1953
St Joseph's Catholic Primary School	Condobolin	Lachlan Shire	K–6	Co-ed	Systemic	????
St Joseph's Catholic Primary School	Coraki	Richmond Valley	K–6	Co-ed	Systemic	1896
St Joseph's Catholic Primary School	Culcairn	Greater Hume	K–6	Co-ed	Systemic	????
St Joseph's Catholic Primary School	Denman	Muswellbrook Shire	K–6	Co-ed	Systemic	1901
St Joseph's Catholix Primary School	Dungog	Dungog Shire	K–6	Co-ed	Systemic	1888
St Joseph's Catholic Primary School	East Maitland	Maitland	K–6	Co-ed	Systemic	1885
St Joseph's Catholic Primary School	Enfield	Burwood	K–6	Co-ed	Systemic	1917
St Joseph's Catholic Primary School	Eugowra	Forbes Shire	K–6	Co-ed	Systemic	????
St Joseph's Catholic Primary School	Finley	Berrigan Shire	K–6	Co-ed	Systemic	1915
St Joseph's Catholic Primary School	Gilgandra	Gilgandra Shire	K–6	Co-ed	Systemic	2009
St Joseph's Catholic Primary School	Glen Innes	Glen Innes Severn	K–6	Co-ed	Systemic	1884
St Joseph's Catholic Primary School	Gloucester	MidCoast Council	K–6	Co-ed	Systemic	1919
St Joseph's Catholic Primary School	Goulburn	Goulburn Mulwaree	K–6	Co-ed	Systemic	1885
St Joseph's Catholic Primary School	Grenfell	Weddin Shire	K–6	Co-ed	Systemic	1876
St Joseph's Catholic Primary School	Hillston	Carrathool Shire	K–6	Co-ed	Systemic	1892
St Joseph's Catholic Primary School	Jerilderie	Murrumbidgee	K–6	Co-ed	Systemic	1882
St Joseph's Catholic Primary School	Junee	Junee Shire	K–6	Co-ed	Systemic	1889
St Joseph's Catholic Primary School	Kilaben Bay	Lake Macquarie	K–6	Co-ed	Systemic	1950
St Joseph's Catholic Primary School	Kingswood	Penrith	K–6	Co-ed	Systemic	1963
St Joseph's Catholic Primary School	Laurieton	Port Macquarie-Hastings	K–6	Co-ed	Systemic	1952
St Joseph's Catholic Primary School	Leeton	Leeton Shire	K–6	Co-ed	Systemic	1917
St Joseph's Catholic Primary School	Lockhart	Lockhart Shire	K—6	Co-ed	Systemic	1908
St Joseph's Catholic Primary School	Maclean	Clarence Valley Council	K–6	Co-ed	Systemic	1898
St Joseph's Catholic Primary School	Manildra	Cabonne Council	K–6	Co-ed	Systemic	1928
St Joseph's Catholic Primary School	Merewether	Newcastle	K–6	Co-ed	Systemic	1885
St Joseph's Catholic Primary School	Merriwa	Upper Hunter Shire	K–6	Co-ed	Systemic	1883
St Joseph's Catholic Primary School	Molong	Cabonne Council	K–6	Co-ed	Systemic	1881
St Joseph's Catholic Primary School	Moorebank	Liverpool	K–6	Co-ed	Systemic	1973
St Joseph's Catholic Primary School	Mungindi	Moree Plains Shire	K–6	Co-ed	Systemic	1924
St Joseph's Catholic Primary School	Narrabeen	Northern Beaches	K–6	Co-ed	Systemic	1939
St Joseph's Catholic Primary School	Narrandera	Narrandera Shire	K–6	Co-ed	Systemic	1890
St Joseph's Catholic Primary School	Nyngan	Bogan Shire	K–6	Co-ed	Systemic	1884
St Joseph's Catholic Primary School	Oatley	Georges River	K–6	Co-ed	Systemic	1953
St Joseph's Catholic Primary School	Oberon	Oberon Council	K–6	Co-ed	Systemic	1912
St Joseph's Catholic Primary School	Peak Hill	Parkes Shire	K–6	Co-ed	Systemic	1895
St Joseph's Catholic Primary School	Portland	Lithgow	K–6	Co-ed	Systemic	1905
St Joseph's Catholic Primary School	Port Macquarie	Port Macquarie-Hastings	K–6	Co-ed	Systemic	1913
St Joseph's Catholic Primary School	Quirindi	Liverpool Plains Shire	K–6	Co-ed	Systemic	1885
St Joseph's Catholic Primary School	Riverwood	Georges River	K–6	Co-ed	Systemic	1949
St Joseph's Catholic Primary School	Rockdale	Bayside	K–6	Co-ed	Systemic	late 1800s
St Joseph's Catholic Primary School	Schofields	Blacktown	K–6	Co-ed	Systemic	1997
St Joseph's Catholic Primary School	South Grafton	Clarence Valley Council	K–6	Co-ed	Systemic	1889
St Joseph's Catholic Primary School	South Murwillumbah	Tweed Shire	K–6	Co-ed	Systemic	1970
St Joseph's Catholic Primary School	Taree	MidCoast Council	K–6	Co-ed	Systemic	????
St Joseph's Catholic Primary School	Tenterfield	Tenterfield Shire	K–6	Co-ed	Systemic	1880
St Joseph's Catholic Primary School	Tweed Heads	Tweed Shire	K–6	Co-ed	Systemic	1917
St Joseph's Catholic Primary School	Uralla	Uralla Shire	K–6	Co-ed	Systemic	1886
St Joseph's Catholic Primary School	Wagga Wagga	Wagga Wagga	K–6	Co-ed	Systemic	1859
St Joseph's Catholic Primary School	Walgett	Walgett Shire	K–6	Co-ed	Systemic	1896
St Joseph's Catholic Primary School	Warialda	Gwydir Shire	K–6	Co-ed	Systemic	1904
St Joseph's Catholic Primary School	Wauchope	Port Macquarie-Hastings	K–6	Co-ed	Systemic	1928
St Joseph's Catholic Primary School	Wee Waa	Narrabri Shire	K–6	Co-ed	Systemic	1909
St Joseph's Catholic Primary School	West Kempsey	Kempsey	K–6	Co-ed	Systemic	1884
St Joseph's Catholic Primary School	West Tamworth	Tamworth	K–6	Co-ed	Systemic	1919
St Joseph's Catholic Primary School	Wingham	MidCoast Council	K–6	Co-ed	Systemic	1901
St Joseph's Catholic Primary School	Woodburn	Richmond Valley	K–6	Co-ed	Systemic	1912
St Justin's Catholic Primary School	Oran Park	Camden	K–6	Co-ed	Systemic	2012
St Kevin's Catholic Primary School	Cardiff	Lake Macquarie	K–6	Co-ed	Systemic	1917
St Kevin's Catholic Primary School	Dee Why	Northern Beaches	K–6	Co-ed	Systemic	1935
St Kevin's Primary School	Eastwood	Ryde	K–6	Co-ed	Systemic	1925
St Kieran's Catholic Primary School	Manly Vale	Northern Beaches	K–6	Co-ed	Systemic	1953
St Lawrence's Primary School (formerly St Lawrence's Central School)	Coonabarabran	Warrumbungle Shire	K–6	Co-ed	Systemic	????
St Laurence's Primary School	Dubbo	Dubbo	K–6	Co-ed	Systemic	1953
St Laurence's Primary School	Forbes	Forbes Shire	K–6	Co-ed	Systemic	1989
St Luke's Catholic Primary School	Revesby	Canterbury-Bankstown	K–6	Co-ed	Systemic	1950
St Madeleine's Primary School	Kenthurst	The Hills	K–6	Co-ed	Systemic	1987
St Margaret Mary's Primary School	Merrylands	Cumberland	K–6	Co-ed	Systemic	1941
St Margaret Mary's Primary School	Randwick North	Randwick	K–6	Co-ed	Systemic	1956
St Mark's Catholic Primary School	Drummoyne	Canada Bay	K–6	Co-ed	Systemic	1889
St Martha's Catholic Primary School	Strathfield	Strathfield	K–6	Co-ed	Systemic	1925
St Martin's Catholic Primary School	Davidson	Northern Beaches	K–6	Co-ed	Systemic	1980
St Mary – St Joseph Catholic Primary School	Maroubra	Randwick	K–6	Co-ed	Systemic	1970
St Mary MacKillop Primary School	South Penrith	Penrith	K–6	Co-ed	Systemic	1983
St Mary of the Angels Primary School	Guyra	Armidale	K–6	Co-ed	Systemic	1919
St Mary's Catholic Primary School	Armidale	Armidale	K–6	Co-ed	Systemic	1849
St Mary's Catholic Primary School	Batlow	Snowy Valleys Council	K–6	Co-ed	Systemic	????
St Mary's Catholic Primary School	Bellingen	Bellingen Shire	K–6	Co-ed	Systemic	1911
St Mary's Catholic Primary School	Bowraville	Nambucca Valley	K–6	Co-ed	Systemic	1906
St Mary's Catholic Primary School	Casino	Richmond Valley	K–6	Co-ed	Systemic	1884
St Mary's Catholic Primary School	Concord	Canada Bay	K–6	Co-ed	Systemic	1953
St Mary's Catholic Primary School	Corowa	Federation Council	K–6	Co-ed	Systemic	1883
St Mary's Catholic Primary School	Crookwell	King County	K–6	Co-ed	Systemic	1903
St Mary's Catholic Primary School	Dubbo	Dubbo	K–6	Co-ed	Systemic	1910
St Mary's Catholic Primary School	Erskineville	Sydney	K–6	Co-ed	Systemic	1913
St Mary's Catholic Primary School	Georges Hall	Canterbury-Bankstown	K–6	Co-ed	Systemic	1979
St Mary's Catholic Primary School	Grafton	Clarence Valley Council	K–6	Co-ed	Systemic	1868
St Mary's Catholic Primary School	Hay	Hay Shire	K–6	Co-ed	Systemic	1883
St Mary's Catholic Primary School	Manly	Northern Beaches	K–6	Co-ed	Systemic	1881
St Mary's Catholic Primary School	Moruya	Eurobodalla	K–6	Co-ed	Systemic	1847
St Mary's Catholic Primary School	Noraville	Central Coast	K–6	Co-ed	Systemic	1973
St Mary's Catholic Primary School	Orange	Orange	K–6	Co-ed	Systemic	1988
St Mary's Catholic Primary School	Rydalmere	Parramatta	K–6	Co-ed	Systemic	1890
St Mary's Catholic Primary School	Scone	Upper Hunter Shire	K–6	Co-ed	Systemic	1887
St Mary's Catholic Primary School	Warners Bay	Lake Macquarie	K–6	Co-ed	Systemic	1958
St Mary's Catholic Primary School	Warren	Warren Shire	K–6	Co-ed	Systemic	1897
St Mary's Catholic Primary School	Yoogali	Griffith	K–6	Co-ed	Systemic	1949
St Mary's Catholic Primary School	Young	Hilltops Council	K–6	Co-ed	Systemic	????
St Mary's Star of the Sea Catholic Primary School	Hurstville	Georges River	K–6	Co-ed	Systemic	1886
St Mary's Star of the Sea Catholic Primary School	Milton	Shoalhaven	K–6	Co-ed	Systemic	1913
St Mary's War Memorial School	West Wyalong	Bland Shire	K–6	Co-ed	Systemic	1897
St Matthew's Primary School	Windsor	Hawkesbury	K–6	Co-ed	Systemic	1832
St Mel's Catholic Primary School	Campsie	Canterbury-Bankstown	K–6	Co-ed	Systemic	1894
St Michael's Catholic Primary School	Baulkham Hills	The Hills	K–6	Co-ed	Systemic	1971
St Michael's Catholic Primary School	Belfield	Canterbury-Bankstown	K–6	Co-ed	Systemic	1959
St Michael's Catholic Primary School	Blacktown South	Blacktown	K–6	Co-ed	Systemic	1962
St Michael's Catholic Primary School	Coolamon	Coolamon Shire	K–6	Co-ed	Systemic	1896
St Michael's Catholic Primary School	Daceyville	Bayside	K–6	Co-ed	Systemic	1914
St Michael's Catholic Primary School	Deniliquin	Edward River Council	K–6	Co-ed	Systemic	1887
St Michael's Catholic Primary School	Dunedoo	Warrumbungle Shire	K–6	Co-ed	Systemic	????
St Michael's Catholic Primary School	Lane Cove	Lane Cove	K–6	Co-ed	Systemic	1922
St Michael's Catholic Primary School	Manilla	Tamworth	K–6	Co-ed	Systemic	1904
St Michael's Catholic Primary School	Meadowbank	Ryde	K–6	Co-ed	Systemic	1922
St Michael's Catholic Primary School	Mittagong	Wingecarribee Shire	K–6	Co-ed	Systemic	1891
St Michael's Catholic Primary School	Nelson Bay	Port Stephens Council	K–6	Co-ed	Systemic	1962
St Michael's Catholic Primary School	Nowra	Shoalhaven	K–6	Co-ed	Systemic	1893
St Michael's Catholic Primary School	Stanmore	Inner West	K–6	Co-ed	Systemic	1912
St Michael's Catholic Primary School	Thirroul	Wollongong	K–6	Co-ed	Systemic	1940
St Monica's Primary School	North Parramatta	Parramatta	K–6	Co-ed	Systemic	1892
St Monica's Primary School	Richmond	Hawkesbury	K–6	Co-ed	Systemic	1859
St Nicholas of Myra Primary School	Penrith	Penrith	K–6	Co-ed	Systemic	1852
St Nicholas' Primary School	Tamworth	Tamworth	K–6	Co-ed	Systemic	1980
St Oliver's Primary School	Harris Park	Parramatta	K–6	Co-ed	Systemic	1930
St Patrick's Catholic Primary School	Albury	Albury	K–6	Co-ed	Systemic	1978
St Patrick's Catholic Primary School	Asquith	Hornsby	K–6	Co-ed	Systemic	1958
St Patrick's Catholic Primary School	Bega	Bega Valley Shire	K–6	Co-ed	Systemic	1872
St Patrick's Catholic Primary School	Blacktown	Blacktown	K–6	Co-ed	Systemic	1919
St Patrick's Catholic Primary School	Brewarrina	Brewarrina Shire	K–6	Co-ed	Systemic	1894
St Patrick's Catholic Primary School	Cessnock	Cessnock	K–6	Co-ed	Systemic	1887
St Patrick's Catholic Primary School	East Gosford	Central Coast	K–6	Co-ed	Systemic	1960
St Patrick's Catholic Primary School	Griffith	Griffith	K–6	Co-ed	Systemic	1921
St Patrick's Catholic Primary School	Guildford	Cumberland	K–6	Co-ed	Systemic	1910
St Patrick's Catholic Primary School	Gundagai	Cootamundra–Gundagai	K–6	Co-ed	Systemic	1876
St Patrick's Catholic Primary School	Holbrook	Greater Hume	K–6	Co-ed	Systemic	1877
St Patrick's Catholic Primary School	Kogarah	Georges River	K–6	Co-ed	Systemic	1862
St Patrick's Catholic Primary School	Lithgow	Lithgow	K–6	Co-ed	Systemic	1880
St Patrick's Catholic Primary School	Lochinvar	Maitland	K–6	Co-ed	Systemic	1865
St Patrick's Catholic Primary School	Macksville	Nambucca Valley Council	K–6	Co-ed	Systemic	1918
St Patrick's Catholic Primary School	Mortlake	Canada Bay	K–6	Co-ed	Systemic	2017
St Patrick's Catholic Primary School	Parramatta	Parramatta	K–6	Co-ed	Systemic	1820
St Patrick's Catholic Primary School	Port Kembla	Wollongong	K–6	Co-ed	Systemic	1918
St Patrick's Catholic Primary School	Summer Hill	Inner West	K–6	Co-ed	Systemic	1949
St Patrick's Catholic Primary School	Sutherland	Sutherland	K–6	Co-ed	Systemic	1956
St Patrick's Catholic Primary School	Swansea	Lake Macquarie	K–6	Co-ed	Systemic	1952
St Patrick's Catholic Primary School	Trundle	Parkes Shire	K–6	Co-ed	Systemic	1928
St Patrick's Catholic Primary School	Walcha	Walcha Shire	K–6	Co-ed	Systemic	1911
St Patrick's Catholic Primary School	Wallsend	Newcastle	K–6	Co-ed	Systemic	1883
St Paul of The Cross School	Dulwich Hill	Inner West	K–6	Co-ed	Systemic	1908
St Paul The Apostle Primary School	Winston Hills	Parramatta	K–6	Co-ed	Systemic	1973
St Paul's Catholic Primary School	Albion Park	Shellharbour	K–6	Co-ed	Systemic	1883
St Paul's Catholic Primary School	Camden	Camden	K–6	Co-ed	Systemic	1883
St Paul's Catholic Primary School	Moss Vale	Wingecarribee	K–6	Co-ed	Systemic	1948
St Paul's Primary School	Gateshead	Newcastle	K–6	Co-ed	Systemic	1964
St Paul's Primary School	Rutherford	Maitland	K–6	Co-ed	Systemic	1957
St Peter Chanel Primary School	Regents Park	Cumberland	K–6	Co-ed	Systemic	1924
St Peter's Primary School	Coleambally	Murrumbidgee Council	K–6	Co-ed	Systemic	1970
St Peter's Primary School	Port Macquarie	Port Macquarie-Hastings	K–6	Co-ed	Systemic	1993
St Peter's Primary School	Stockton	Newcastle	K–6	Co-ed	Systemic	1887
St Philip Neri Catholic Primary School (formerly known as St Ciaran's)	Northbridge	Willoughby	K–6	Co-ed	Systemic	1926
St Philomena's Catholic Primary School	South Bathurst	Bathurst	K–6	Co-ed	Systemic	1901
St Pius X Catholic Primary School	Unanderra	Wollongong	K–6	Co-ed	Systemic	1960
St Pius X Primary School	Dubbo	Dubbo	K–6	Co-ed	Systemic	1973
St Pius X Primary School	Windale	Lake Macquarie	K–6	Co-ed	Systemic	1955
St Pius' Primary School	Enmore	Inner West	K–6	Co-ed	Systemic	1907
St Raphael's Catholic Primary School	South Hurstville	Georges River	K–6	Co-ed	Systemic	1929
St Rose Catholic Primary School	Collaroy Plateau	Northern Beaches	K–6	Co-ed	Systemic	1973
St Therese Catholic Primary School	Mascot	Bayside	K–6	Co-ed	Systemic	1940
St Therese Catholic Primary School	Padstow	Canterbury-Bankstown	K–6	Co-ed	Systemic	1963
St Therese Catholic Primary School	Sadleir	Liverpool	K–6	Co-ed	Systemic	1967
St Therese's Catholic Primary School	Denistone	Ryde	K–6	Co-ed	Systemic	1951
St Therese's Catholic Primary School	Lakemba	Canterbury-Bankstown	K–6	Co-ed	Systemic	1926
St Therese's Catholic Primary School	New Lambton	Newcastle	K–6	Co-ed	Systemic	1925
St Therese's Catholic Primary School Mangerton	West Wollongong	Wollongong	K–6	Co-ed	Systemic	1939
St Therese's Community Primary School (formerly St Therese's Mission School)	Wilcannia	Central Darling Shire	K–6	Co-ed	Systemic	1966
St Thomas Aquinas Catholic Primary School	Bowral	Wingecarribee	K–6	Co-ed	Systemic	1903
St Thomas Aquinas Primary School	Springwood	Blue Mountains	K–6	Co-ed	Systemic	1921
St Thomas More Catholic Primary School	Campbelltown	Campbelltown	K–6	Co-ed	Systemic	1978
St Thomas More's School	Brighton-Le-Sands	Bayside	K–6	Co-ed	Systemic	1938
St Thomas' Catholic Primary School	Willoughby	Willoughby	K–6	Co-ed	Systemic	1928
St Xavier's Primary School	Gunnedah	Gunnedah	K–6	Co-ed	Systemic	1879
Stella Maris Catholic Primary School	Shellharbour	Shellharbour	K–6	Co-ed	Systemic	1953
Trinity Catholic Primary School	Kemps Creek	Penrith	K–6	Co-ed	Systemic	1993
Trinity Catholic Primary School (merger of St Mary's School and St Columba's)	Murrumburrah	Hilltops Council	K–6	Co-ed	Systemic	1980
Villa Maria Primary School	Hunters Hill	Hunters Hill	K–6	Co-ed	Systemic	1907

== Catholic high and K–12 schools ==
School	Suburb or town	LGA	Years	M/F/co-ed	Category	Founded
All Saints Catholic College	Liverpool	Liverpool	K-10	Co-ed	Systemic	1834
All Saints Catholic Senior College	Casula	Liverpool	11–12	Co-ed	Systemic	1987
All Saints College	Maitland	Maitland	7–12	Co-ed	Systemic	1992
Aquinas Catholic College	Menai	Sutherland	7–12	Co-ed	Systemic	1993
Bede Polding College	South Windsor	Hawkesbury	7–12	Co-ed	Systemic	1986
Bethany College	Hurstville	Georges River	7–12	F	Systemic	1993
Brigidine College Randwick	Randwick	Randwick	7–12	F	Systemic	1901
Brigidine College, St Ives	St Ives	Ku-ring-gai	7–12	F	Brigidine Sisters	1954
Caroline Chisholm College (formerly Caroline Chisholm Catholic College)	Glenmore Park	Penrith	7–12	F	Systemic	1974
Carroll College	Broulee	Eurobodalla	7–12	Co-ed	Systemic	1995
Casimir Catholic College	Marrickville	Inner West	7–12	Co-ed	Systemic	1983
Catherine McAuley Catholic College	Medowie	Port Stephens Council	7–12	Co-ed	Systemic	2021
Catherine McAuley Westmead	Westmead	Parramatta	7–12	F	Systemic	1966
Cathwest Innovation College (Formerly Loyola Senior High School)	Mount Druitt	Blacktown	10–12	Co-ed	Systemic	
Cerdon College	Merrylands	Cumberland	7–12	F	Systemic	1960
Chevalier College	Burradoo	Wingecarribee	7–12	Co-ed	Missionaries of the Sacred Heart	1946
Christian Brothers' High School, Lewisham	Lewisham	Inner West	5–12	M	Christian Brothers	1891
Clancy Catholic College	West Hoxton	Liverpool	7–12	Co-ed	Systemic	2006
Corpus Christi Catholic High School	Oak Flats	Shellharbour	7–12	Co-ed	Systemic	2006
Corpus Christi College (Formerley Champagnat College Pagewood)	Maroubra	Randwick	7–12	Co-ed	Systemic	1961
De La Salle College, Caringbah	Caringbah	Sutherland	7–10	M	Systemic	1958
De La Salle College, Cronulla	Cronulla	Sutherland	11–12	Co-ed	Systemic	1936
De La Salle College, Revesby Heights	Revesby Heights	Canterbury-Bankstown	7–12	M	Systemic	1960
Delany College	Granville	Cumberland	7–12	Co-ed	Systemic	1997
Domremy College	Five Dock	Canada Bay	7–12	F	Systemic	1911
Edmund Rice College	West Wollongong	Wollongong	7–12	M	Christian Brothers	1926
Emmaus Catholic College	Kemps Creek	Penrith	7–12	Co-ed	Systemic	1988
Freeman Catholic College	Bonnyrigg Heights	Fairfield	7–12	Co-ed	Systemic	1985
Gilroy Catholic College	Castle Hill	The Hills	7–12	Co-ed	Systemic	1980
Good Samaritan Catholic College	Hinchinbrook	Liverpool	7–12	Co-ed	Systemic	1999
Hartford College	Daceyville	Bayside	5–12	M	Independent	2023
Hennessy Catholic College	Young	Hilltops Council	7–12	Co-ed	Systemic	1919
Holy Cross College, Ryde	Ryde	Ryde	7–12	M	Systemic	1891
Holy Spirit College	Bellambi	Wollongong	7–12	Co-ed	Systemic	1983
Holy Spirit College	Lakemba	Canterbury-Bankstown	7–12	Co-ed	Systemic	1954
Holy Trinity School	Inverell	Inverell Shire	K–10	Co-ed	Systemic	1963
James Sheahan Catholic High School	Orange	Orange	7–12	Co-ed	Systemic	1980
John Therry Catholic High School	Rosemeadow	Campbelltown	7–12	Co-ed	Systemic	1981
John XXIII Catholic College	Stanhope Gardens	Blacktown	K–12	Co-ed	Systemic	2005
Kildare Catholic College	Wagga Wagga	Wagga Wagga	7–12	Co-ed	Systemic	2004
Kincoppal–Rose Bay School of the Sacred Heart	Rose Bay	Woollahra	K–12	Co-ed & F	Society of the Sacred Heart	1971
La Salle Academy	Lithgow	Lithgow	7–12	Co-ed	Systemic	1953
LaSalle Catholic College, Bankstown	Bankstown	Canterbury-Bankstown	7–12	Co-ed	Systemic	1999
Loreto Kirribilli	Kirribilli	North Sydney	K–12	F	Loreto	1901
Loreto Normanhurst	Normanhurst	Hornsby	5–12	F	Loreto	1897
Lumen Christi Catholic College	Pambula Beach	Bega Valley Shire	K–12	Co-ed	Systemic	2001
MacKillop Catholic College	Warnervale	Central Coast	K–12	Co-ed	Systemic	2003
MacKillop College, Bathurst	Bathurst	Bathurst	7–12	F	Systemic	1967
MacKillop College (formerly a campus of St Joseph's High School)	Port Macquarie	Port Macquarie-Hastings	7–12	Co-ed	Systemic	1988
Magdalene Catholic High School	Narellan	Camden	7–12	Co-ed	Systemic	1999
Marcellin College	Randwick	Randwick	7–12	M	Systemic	1923
Marian Catholic College (formerly Catholic High School)	Griffith	Griffith	7–12	Co-ed	Systemic	1970
Marian College	Kenthurst	The Hills	7–12	Co-ed	Systemic	1988
Marist College Eastwood	Eastwood	Ryde	7–12	M	Systemic	1937
Marist College Kogarah	Bexley	Bayside	7–12	M	Systemic	1909
Marist College North Shore	North Sydney	North Sydney	K–12	Co-ed	Systemic	1888
Marist College Penshurst	Mortdale	Georges River	7–12	Co-ed	Systemic	1953
Marist Sisters' College, Woolwich	Woolwich	Hunter's Hill	7–12	F	Systemic	1908
Maronite College of the Holy Family (formerly Our Lady of Lebanon College)	Harris Park	Parramatta	K–12	Co-ed	Maronite	1973
Mary MacKillop College	Wakeley	Fairfield	7–12	F	Systemic	1991
Mater Dei Catholic College	Wagga Wagga	Wagga Wagga	7–12	Co-ed	Systemic	2004
Mater Maria Catholic College	Warriewood	Northern Beaches	7–12	Co-ed	Systemic	1962
McAuley Catholic Central School	Tumut	Snowy Valleys Council	K–12	Co-ed	Systemic	1923
McAuley Catholic College	Clarenza	Clarence Valley Council	7–12	Co-ed	Systemic	2002
McCarthy Catholic College	West Tamworth	Tamworth	7–12	Co-ed	Systemic	2000
Mercy Catholic College	Chatswood	Willoughby	7–12	F	Systemic	1890
Monte Sant' Angelo Mercy College	North Sydney	North Sydney	7–12	F	Sisters of Mercy	1875
Mount Carmel Catholic College	Varroville	Campbelltown	7–12	Co-ed	Systemic	1986
Mount St Benedict College	Pennant Hills	Hornsby	7–12	F	Sisters of the Good Samaritan	1966
Mount Saint Joseph, Milperra	Milperra	Canterbury-Bankstown	7–12	F	Systemic	1960
Mount Saint Patrick College	Murwillumbah	Tweed Shire	7–12	Co-ed	Systemic	1926
Nagle College	Blacktown	Blacktown	7–12	F	Systemic	1965
Newman Senior Technical College (formerly Australian Technical College – Port Macquarie)	Port Macquarie	Port Macquarie-Hastings	11–12	Co-ed	Systemic	1979
O'Connor Catholic College	Armidale	Armidale	7–12	Co-ed	Systemic	1975
Oakhill College	Rogans Hill	Hornsby	7–12	Co-ed	De La Salle Brothers	1937
Our Lady of Mercy College, Burraneer	Cronulla	Sutherland	7–10	F	Systemic	1932
Our Lady of Mercy College, Parramatta	Parramatta	Parramatta	7–12	F	Sisters of Mercy	1889
Our Lady of The Sacred Heart College	Kensington	Randwick	7–12	F	Systemic	1897
Parramatta Marist High School	Westmead	Parramatta	7–12	M	Systemic	1820
Patrician Brothers' College, Blacktown	Blacktown	Blacktown	7–12	M	Systemic	1952
Patrician Brothers' College, Fairfield	Fairfield	Fairfield	7–12	M	Systemic	1953
Penola Catholic College, Emu Plains (Formerley McCarthy Catholic College)	Emu Plains	Penrith	7–12	Co-ed	Systemic	1986
Red Bend Catholic College	Forbes	Forbes Shire	7–12	Co-ed	Marist Brothers / Sisters of Mercy	1977
Rosebank College	Five Dock	Canada Bay	7–12	Co-ed	Sisters of the Good Samaritan	1867
Sacred Heart Central School	Cootamundra	Cootamundra–Gundagai	K–10	Co-ed	Systemic	1870
San Clemente High School	Mayfield	Newcastle	7–10	Co-ed	Systemic	1916
Santa Sabina College	Strathfield	Strathfield	K–12	Co-ed & F	Dominican	1894
Santa Sophia Catholic College, Gables	Schofields	Blacktown	K–12	Co-ed	Systemic	2018
Southern Cross Catholic Vocational College	Burwood	Burwood	9–12	Co-ed	Systemic	2010
St Agnes Catholic High School (formerly Christ Catholic College – St Agnes Campus)	Rooty Hill	Blacktown	7–12	Co-ed	Systemic	1962
St Aloysius' College	Milsons Point	North Sydney	3–12	M	Jesuit	1879
St Andrews College	Marayong	Blacktown	7–12	Co-ed	Systemic	1998
St Anne's Central School	Temora	Temora Shire	K–12	Co-ed	Systemic	1881
St Anthony of Padua Catholic College	Austral	Liverpool	K–9	Co-ed	Systemic	2017
St Augustine's College, Brookvale	Brookvale	Northern Beaches	5–12	M	Augustinian	1956
St Bede's Catholic College	Chisholm	Maitland	7–12	Co-ed	Systemic	2018
St Benedict's Catholic College	Oran Park	Camden	7–12	Co-ed	Systemic	2011
St Brigid's Catholic College	Lake Munmorah	Central Coast	7–12	Co-ed	Systemic	2014
St Catherine's Catholic College	Singleton	Singleton Council	K–12	Co-ed	Systemic	1875
St Charbel's College	Punchbowl	Canterbury-Bankstown	K–12	Co-ed	Maronite	1984
St Clare's Catholic High School (formerly Christ Catholic College – Clare Campus)	Hassall Grove	Blacktown	7–12	Co-ed	Systemic	1993
St Clare's College	Waverley	Waverley	7–12	F	Systemic	1884
St Clare's High School	Taree	Mid-Coast	7–12	Co-ed	Systemic	1971
St Columba's Catholic College (formerly St Columba's High School)	Springwood	Blue Mountains	7–12	Co-ed	Systemic	1979
St Dominic's College	Kingswood	Penrith	7–12	M	Christian Brothers	1959
St Edward's Christian Brothers College	East Gosford	Central Coast	7–12	M	Christian Brothers	1953
St Francis Catholic College, Oran Park	Edmondson Park	Liverpool	K–12	Co-ed	Systemic	2017
St Francis de Sales Regional College	Leeton	Leeton Shire	7–12	Co-ed	Systemic	1956
St Francis Xavier's College	Hamilton	Newcastle	11–12	Co-ed	Systemic	1985
St Gregory's College, Campbelltown	Campbelltown	Campbelltown	K–12	M & Co-ed	Marist Brothers	1926
St Ignatius' College, Riverview	Lane Cove	Lane Cove	5–12	M	Jesuit	1880
St John Bosco College	Engadine	Sutherland	7–12	Co-ed	Systemic	1978
St John Paul College	Coffs Harbour	Coffs Harbour	7–12	Co-ed	Systemic	1983
St John Paul II Catholic College (formerly Terra Sancta College)	Quakers Hill	Blacktown	7–12	Co-ed	Systemic	1996
St John the Evangelist Catholic High School	Nowra	Shoalhaven	7–12	Co-ed	Systemic	1990
St John's College	Dubbo	Dubbo	7–12	Co-ed	Systemic	1969
St John's College, Woodlawn	Lismore	Lismore	7–12	Co-ed	Systemic	1931
St Joseph's Catholic College	East Gosford	Central Coast	7–12	F	Systemic	1960
St Joseph's Catholic High School	Albion Park	Shellharbour	7–12	Co-ed	Systemic	1982
St Joseph's College	Banora Point	Tweed Shire	7–12	Co-ed	Systemic	1993
St Joseph's College	Hunters Hill	Hunter's Hill	7–12	M	Marist Brothers	1881
St Joseph's College	Lochinvar	Maitland	7–12	Co-ed	Systemic	1883
St Joseph's High School	Aberdeen	Upper Hunter Shire	7–12	Co-ed	Systemic	1896
St Joseph's Regional College (formerly St Joseph's Hastings Regional High School)	Port Macquarie	Port Macquarie-Hastings	7–12	Co-ed	Systemic	1969
St Leo's Catholic College	Wahroonga	Hornsby	7–12	Co-ed	Systemic	1955
St Luke's Catholic College	Marsden Park	Blacktown	K–12	Co-ed	Systemic	2017
St Maroun's College	Dulwich Hill	Inner West	K–12	Co-ed	Maronite	1970
St Mary MacKillop College (formerly Blessed Mary MacKillop Colleges Albury)	Jindera	Greater Hume	K–12	Co-ed	Independent	2009
St Mary MacKillop Colleges (formerly Blessed Mary MacKillop College)	Wagga Wagga	Wagga Wagga	K–12	Co-ed	Independent	2007
St Mary Star of the Sea College	Wollongong	Wollongong	7–12	F	Sisters of the Good Samaritan	1873
St Mary's Cathedral College, Sydney	Sydney	Sydney	3–12	M	Systemic	1824
St Mary's Catholic College	Gateshead	Lake Macquarie	7–12	Co-ed	Systemic	1964
St Mary's Catholic College	Casino	Richmond Valley	7–12	Co-ed	Systemic	1978
St Mary's Catholic School (formerly known as St Mary's Central School)	Wellington	Dubbo	K–10	Co-ed	Systemic	1861
St Mary's College	Gunnedah	Gunnedah Shire	7–12	Co-ed	Systemic	1879
St Matthew's Catholic School	Mudgee	Mid-West	K–12	Co-ed	Systemic	1912
St Patrick's College	Campbelltown	Campbelltown	7–12	F	Sisters of the Good Samaritan	1840
St Patrick's College, Strathfield	Strathfield	Strathfield	5–12	M	Christian Brothers	1928
St Patrick's College Sutherland	Sutherland	Sutherland	7–12	Co-ed	Systemic	1956
St Patrick's Marist College	Dundas	Parramatta	7–12	Co-ed	Systemic	1872
St Patrick's Parish School	Cooma	Snowy Monaro	K–10	Co-ed	Systemic	1887
St Paul's Catholic College	Booragul	Lake Macquarie	7–12	Co-ed	Systemic	1984
St Paul's Catholic College	Greystanes	Cumberland	7–12	M	Systemic	1958
St Paul's Catholic College	Manly	Northern Beaches	7–12	M	Systemic	1929
St Paul's College, Kempsey	West Kempsey	Kempsey	7–12	Co-ed	Systemic	1980
St Paul's International College (formerly known as Aurora College)	Moss Vale	Wingecarribee	7–12	Co-ed	Sisters of Charity of St. Paul	1986
St Peter's Catholic College	Tuggerah	Central Coast	7–12	Co-ed	Systemic	2000
St Philomena's School	Moree	Moree Plains Shire	K–10	Co-ed	Systemic	1898
St Pius X College	Chatswood	Willoughby	5–12	M	Christian Brothers	1937
St Pius X High School	Adamstown	Newcastle	7–10	Co-ed	Systemic	1959
St Raphael's Central School	Cowra	Cowra Shire	K–12	Co-ed	Systemic	1870
St Scholastica's College	Glebe Point	Sydney	7–12	F	Sisters of the Good Samaritan	1878
St Stanislaus' College	Bathurst	Bathurst	7–12	M	Congregation of the Mission	1867
St Ursula's College	Kingsgrove	Canterbury-Bankstown	7–12	F	Systemic	1957
St Vincent's College	Ashfield	Inner West	K–12	Co-ed	Systemic	2023
St Vincent's College	Potts Point	Sydney	7–12	F	Sisters of Charity	1858
Stella Maris College	Manly	Northern Beaches	7–12	F	Sisters of the Good Samaritan	1931
Trinity Catholic College	Auburn	Cumberland	7–12	Co-ed	Systemic	1995
Trinity Catholic College, Goulburn (amalgamation of St Patrick's College and Marian College)	Goulburn	Goulburn Mulwaree	7–12	Co-ed	Systemic	2000
Trinity Catholic College, Lismore	Lismore	Lismore	7–12	Co-ed	Marist Brothers	1985
Waverley College	Waverley	Waverley	5–12	M	Christian Brothers	1903
Xavier Catholic College Ballina	Skennars Head	Ballina	7–12	Co-ed	Systemic	2000
Xavier College	Llandilo	Penrith	7–12	Co-ed	Systemic	1999
Xavier High School	North Albury	Albury	7–12	Co-ed	Systemic	1983

== Special schools ==
School	Suburb or town	M/F/Co-ed	Diocese	Founded
Eileen O'Connor Catholic College	Lewisham	Co-ed	Sydney	2016
Dunlea Centre, Australia's Original Boys' Town	Engadine	Co-ed	Sydney	1939
Mater Dei School	Camden	Co-ed	Wollongong	1910
St Dominic's Centre For Hearing Impaired Children	Mayfield	Co-ed	Maitland-Newcastle	1875
St Edmund's School	Wahroonga	Co-ed	Broken Bay	1951
St Gabriel's School for Hearing Impaired Children	Castle Hill	Co-ed	Parramatta	1922
St Lucy's School	Wahroonga	Co-ed	Broken Bay	1938
The John Berne School (formerly known as Berne Education Centre)	Lewisham	Co-ed	Sydney	1998

== See also ==
- List of non-government schools in New South Wales
- Catholic Education in the Diocese of Parramatta
- Catholic education in Australia
- The Seminary of the Good Shepherd
