= CathWest Innovation College =

Location
- Mount Druitt; Sydney, New South Wales; Australia; 33°46′10″S 150°49′53″E

Information
- Type: Independent comprehensive co-educational secondary day school
- Motto: Finding God In All Things
- Religious affiliation: Roman Catholic
- Patron saint: Saint Ignatius of Loyola
- Established: 1965; 61 years ago
- Oversight: Catholic Education Office, Diocese of Parramatta
- Principal: Paul Stenning
- Grades: 10–12
- Campus size: 8 hectares (20 acres)
- Affiliation: Christ Catholic College Community of Schools

CathWest Innovation College is an independent Roman Catholic comprehensive co-educational secondary day school for students in Year Ten, Year Eleven and Year Twelve, located on two campuses; Loyola Campus (Mount Druitt), and McCarthy Campus (Emu Plains), both located in the suburbs of Greater Western Sydney, New South Wales, Australia. An Ignatian school in the tradition of Saint Ignatius of Loyola, the school was founded in 1993 and is a current member of the Christ Catholic College Community of Schools, linked to the international network of Jesuit schools begun in Messina, Sicily in 1548. The school is administered through the Catholic Education Office of the Diocese of Parramatta.

Loyola Senior High School, a previous school in Mount Druitt, was closed at the conclusion of the 2019 Higher School Certificate year and the site was incorporated into CathWest Innovation College and is known as CathWest Innovation College – Loyola Campus. Additionally, a second campus was opened up in Emu Plains, and is known as CathWest Innovation College — McCarthy Campus.

The eight-hectare (twenty-acre) lightly wooded and landscaped site received the Sulman Award from the Royal Australian Institute of Architects for its design.

== Notable alumni ==
- Kylie Gauci – current member of the Australian Gliders wheelchair basketball team
- Mile Jedinak – Former captain of the Australian Soccer Team, the Socceroos.
- Jano Toussounian – actor

== See also ==
- List of Catholic schools in New South Wales
- Catholic Education, Diocese of Parramatta
- Catholic education in Australia
