= Gilroy College =

Gilroy Catholic College

Location
- 17–37 Marie Street, Castle Hill, New South Wales; Australia; 33°44′23″S 150°59′48″E

Information
- Type: comprehensive co-educational secondary day school
- Motto: Christ is my Light
- Denomination: Roman Catholic
- Established: 1980; 46 years ago
- Oversight: Catholic Education Office, Diocese of Parramatta
- Principal: Cheryl Merryweather
- Years: 7–12
- Enrolment: 1,305
- Colours: Blue and gold
- Feeder schools: St Michael's, Baulkham Hills; Our Lady of Lourdes, Baulkham Hills South; St Bernadette's, Castle Hill; Our Lady of the Rosary, Kellyville
- Website: www.gilroy.catholic.edu.au

Gilroy Catholic College is a Roman Catholic comprehensive co-educational secondary day school located in Castle Hill, in the Hills District of Sydney, New South Wales, Australia. The College provides a Catholic and general education for students from Year 7 through to Year 12 and is administered by the Catholic Education Office of the Diocese of Parramatta.

== History ==
Gilroy Catholic College was founded in 1980 and was built on the land formerly belonging to St Gabriel's School for the Hearing Impaired, which occupied the site from 1922. The school was initially intended for students from Year 7 to Year 10, but it was extended to years 11 and 12 in 1982. By 2001, the student population was nearly 1100 and Gilroy Catholic College had become a popular seven stream school with over 90 staff.

== Norman Gilroy ==
Gilroy Catholic College was named after Cardinal Sir Norman Thomas Gilroy, the first cardinal born in Australia. As well as adopting his name, the college also made Cardinal Gilroy's motto, "Christ is my Light," its official motto.

== Government funding ==
On 9 February 2008, The Sydney Morning Herald reported that, according to Green Party analysis of government figures, Gilroy received $12.2 million more in federal government funding than its entitlement under the socioeconomic status (SES) formula.

== Notable alumni ==
- Lynda Kinkade, Australian journalist and CNN International news anchor
- Jonathan Boulet, rock musician
- Sean Abbott, cricketer representing Australia in One Day International and Twenty20 cricket
- Dylan Ruiz-Diaz, Australian professional footballer who played for the Central Coast Mariners and Thai club Nakhon Si United
- Kane Cleal, rugby league player
- Fiona Crawford, softball player and Olympic medalist
- Trent Oeltjen, baseball player at the 2004 Summer Olympics; played 3 seasons in the MLB for the Arizona Diamondbacks and the Los Angeles Dodgers
- Nathan McMillan, former Parramatta Eels rugby league player

== See also ==
- List of Catholic schools in New South Wales
- Catholic education in Australia
- Catholic Education, Diocese of Parramatta
