= Caroline Chisholm College =

Location
- Glenmore Park, Sydney; Australia; 33°47′8″S 150°40′30″E

Information
- Type: Independent comprehensive single-sex secondary day school
- Motto: Faith, Courage, Tolerance
- Denomination: Roman Catholic
- Established: 1974; 52 years ago
- Oversight: Catholic Education Office of the Diocese of Parramatta
- Principal: Tania Cairns
- Staff: ~100
- Years: 7–12
- Gender: Girls
- Enrolment: c. 970
- Campus type: Suburban
- Colours: Sky blue and white
- Website: cccglenmorepark.catholic.edu.au

Caroline Chisholm College is an independent Roman Catholic comprehensive secondary day school for girls, in Glenmore Park, a western suburb of Sydney, Australia. The college is administered by the Catholic Education Office of the Diocese of Parramatta.

The school was established in 1974 and is named in honor of Caroline Chisholm, a pioneer in Australian history and social reformer. It currently enrols over 1000 students

The school has an empowerment program "for young women as a way to build their sense of self-worth".

== See also ==
- List of Catholic schools in New South Wales
- Catholic education in the Diocese of Parramatta
- Catholic education in Australia
