= Emmaus Catholic College =

Location
- Kemps Creek, Sydney, New South Wales; Australia; 33°49′56″S 150°47′36″E

Information
- Type: Independent co-educational secondary day school
- Motto: We Walk With Jesus
- Denomination: Roman Catholic
- Established: 1988
- Oversight: Catholic Education, Parramatta Diocese
- Principal: Gabriela Osterlund
- Colours: Navy blue, red and white
- Website: emmauskempscreek.catholic.edu.au

Emmaus Catholic College is an independent Roman Catholic co-educational secondary day school, located in Kemps Creek, Sydney, New South Wales, Australia.

The college was established in 1988 and caters for students from Years 7–12. The college is under the direction of the Catholic Education, Parramatta Diocese.

== Overview ==
The school was, in part, named "Emmaus" as it is located approximately 11 kilometres (7 mi) from St Marys, Western Sydney, while Emmaus was also located 11 kilometres (7 mi) from Jerusalem.

Emmaus Catholic College is linked to two parishes – Our Lady of the Rosary in St Marys and Holy Spirit in St Clair.

From 2009 the school has undergone renovations. These included school facilities, a refurbishment of its chapel and a new oval.

The Emmaus Catholic College principal was Robert Nastasi, who was appointed as principal in Term 4 of the 2016 academic year to the end of the 2023 academic year.

The Emmaus Catholic College principal is Gabriela Osterlund, who was appointed as principal in Term 1 of the 2024 academic year.

== See also ==
- List of Catholic schools in New South Wales
- Catholic education in Australia
- Catholic Education in the Diocese of Parramatta
