= Delany College =

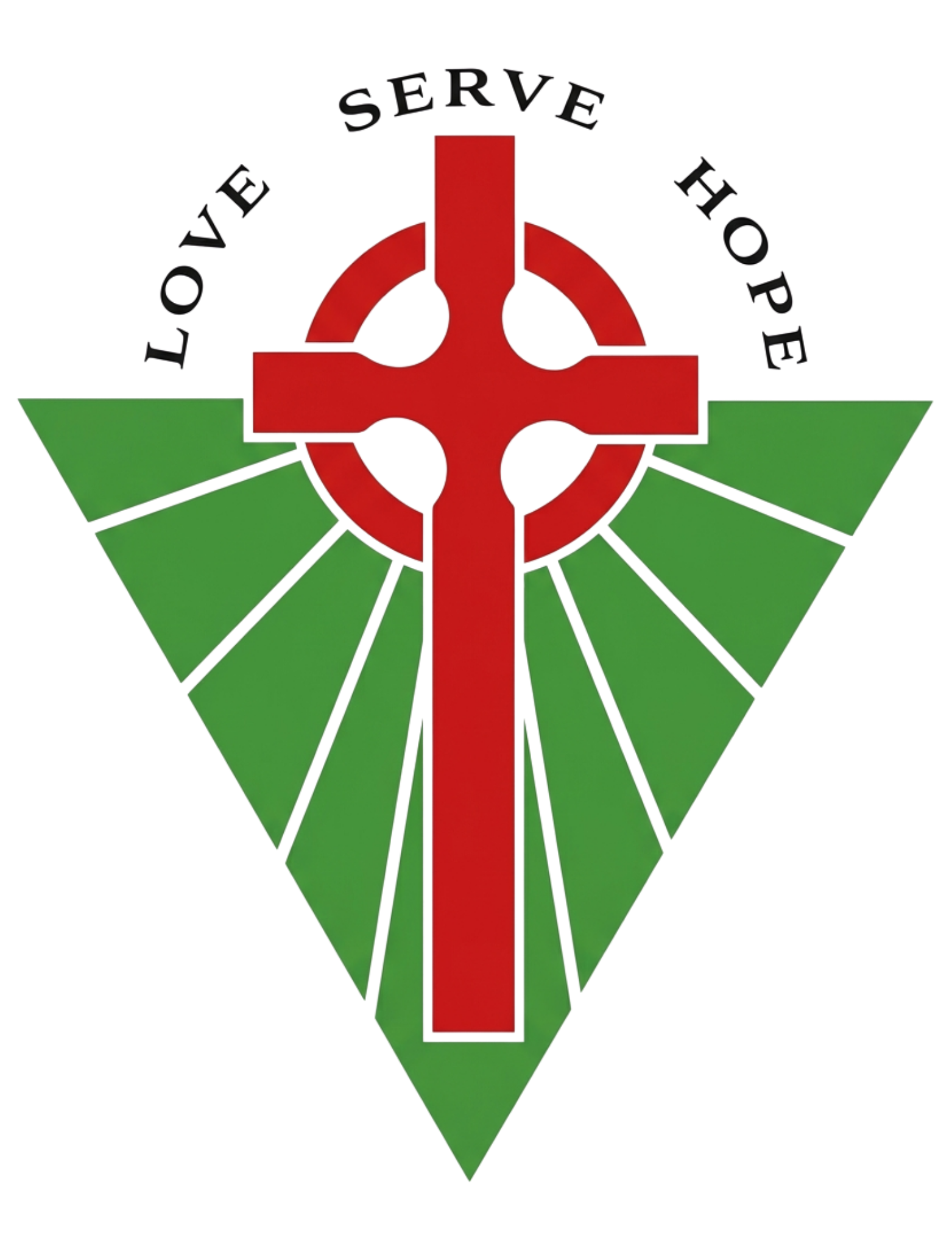
- Granville, New South Wales; Australia

Information
- Former names: Patrician Brothers' High School; Patrician Brothers, Granville
- Type: Independent comprehensive co-educational secondary day school
- Motto: Love, Serve, Hope (St Paul to the Romans 12:9–13)
- Religious affiliation: Patrician Brothers
- Denomination: Roman Catholic
- Established: 1942; 84 years ago (as Patrician Brothers' High School); 1997; 29 years ago (as Delany College)
- Oversight: Catholic Education Office, Diocese of Parramatta
- Principal: Shauna Nash
- Staff: 51 (full-time)
- Years: 7–12
- Enrolment: 348 (2025)
- Colours: Navy blue, green, red and white
- Feeder schools: Holy Trinity Primary, Granville; Holy Family Primary, Granville East; St Patrick's Primary, Guildford; St Margaret Mary's Primary, Merrylands
- Website: www.delanygranville.catholic.edu.au

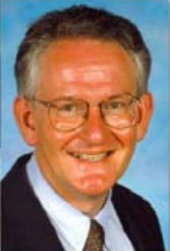
Mr Quentin Evans

Delany College is an independent Roman Catholic comprehensive co-educational secondary day school, located in Granville, a western suburb of Sydney, New South Wales, Australia; in the tradition of the Patrician Brothers. Founded in 1942 as the Patrician Brothers' High School, the College is administratively overseen by the Catholic Education Office of the Diocese of Parramatta.

Delany College has enrolment of approximately 348 students from Year 7 to Year 12. Students are drawn from a number of local catholic schools including Holy Trinity Primary, Granville; Holy Family Primary, Granville East; St Patrick's Primary, Guildford and St Margaret Mary's Primary, Merrylands.

== History ==
=== Foundation ===
Delany College was established in 1942 as Patrician Brothers' High School, a Catholic all-boys school catering for students in Years 5 to 10. The school was founded to serve the growing Catholic population in the Granville area and was staffed entirely by members of the Patrician Brothers congregation.

=== Transition to Delany College ===
In 1997, the school underwent a significant transformation to meet the changing educational needs of the local community. Under the leadership of the first lay principal, Quentin Evans, the school became a co-educational Year 7 to 12 college. At this time, the institution was renamed "Delany College" in honour of Bishop Daniel Delany, the founder of the Patrician Brothers.

The late 1990s and early 2000s saw a major building program to upgrade the campus facilities for senior secondary education and co-educational requirements. While the school transitioned to lay leadership, it maintains a strong connection to its Patrician heritage.

=== Principals ===
The following individuals have served as Principals of Patrician Brothers Granville and Delany College, Granville:

Ordinal	Officeholder	Term Start	Term End	Time in office
1	Br Joseph Tierney	1942	1947	5 Years
2	Br Gerard Histon	1948	1951	3 Years
3	Br De Sales Gilbert	1952	1959	7 Years
4	Br Peter Johnson	1960	1962	2 Years
5	Br Cronan O’Meara	1963	1968	5 Years
6	Br Gabriel McCluskie	1969	1969	< 1 Year
7	Br Callistus Keating	1969	1969	< 1 Year
8	Br Celestine Mulhall	1970	1974	4 Years
9	Br Raymond Eves	1975	1977	2 Years
10	Br Joseph Crowley	1978	1997	19 Years
11	Quentin Evans	1997	1998	1 Year
12	Michael Krawec	1999	2001	2 Years
13	Michael Barrington	2002	2005	3 Years
14	Peter Wade	2006	2015	9 Years
15	Robert Muscat	2016	2019	3 Years
16	Paul Easton	2020	2021	1 Year
17	Shauna Nash	2022		

=== House System ===
The College operates a house system for pastoral care and sporting competitions. The houses are named after figures prominent in the Catholic and Patrician tradition:

Campion (White)

Mackillop (Red)

Tierney (Green)

Chisolm (Blue)

== Notable alumni ==
- Pat Farmer AM – an ultra-marathon athlete, motivational speaker, and former Australian politician, who served as a Member of the House of Representatives (Lib.) from 2001 to 2010, representing Macarthur, New South Wales
- Kim Yeadon – a former politician who served as a member of the New South Wales Legislative Assembly (ALP) from 1990 to 2007; former NSW Minister for Energy 1999–2003

== See also ==
- List of Catholic schools in New South Wales
- Catholic Education, Diocese of Parramatta
- Catholic education in Australia
