= St Andrews College (Marayong) =

St Andrews College, Marayong

Location
- Marayong, western Sydney, New South Wales; Australia; 33°44′57″S 150°53′19″E

Information
- Type: Independent co-educational secondary day school
- Motto: "Faith in Christ" / Doing more, Going Beyond
- Denomination: Roman Catholicism
- Patron saint: St Andrew the Apostle
- Established: 1998; 28 years ago
- Educational authority: New South Wales Department of Education
- Oversight: Catholic Education Office, Diocese of Parramatta
- Principal: Stephen Kennaugh
- Assistant Principal(s): Patrick Finnerty (Systems, Data and Professional Learning); Josilin Kalifa (Teaching, Learning and Wellbeing); Nick Thrum (Assistant Principal- Wellbeing and Learning)
- Staff: 109
- Years: 7–12
- Enrolment: 2123 (2024)
- Campus: 116 Quakers Road (Junior campus); 50 Breakfast Road (Senior campus)
- Campus type: Suburban
- Colours: Navy blue, light blue, taupe and gold
- Website: www.standrewscmarayong.catholic.edu.au

St Andrews College is a dual-campus independent Roman Catholic co-educational secondary day school, located in Marayong, a western suburb of Sydney, New South Wales, Australia. The school provides education for students from Year 7 to Year 12. Founded in 1998, the college is a school of the Catholic Education Office of the Diocese of Parramatta.

== History ==
St Andrews College was established in 1998 from the amalgamation of John Paul II Senior High School (founded in 1981) and Holy Family High School (1967–2010). The dual campus high school took its name from the local parish, St Andrew the Apostle. Notable alumni such as legendary retired Australian netball player and television presenter Liz Ellis AO attended the college before its amalgamation of St Andrews College in 1998 and Mel McLaughlin, who currently works as a famous sports presenter at 7NEWS Sydney. At the ARIA Music Awards of 2019, Music Teacher Antonio Chiappetta won Music Teacher of the Year.

== Structure ==
The school consists of two campus located within a kilometre of each other. Junior Campus serves education for years 7-10 while the Senior Campus serves education for year 11 & 12.

== Principals ==
The college has had a number of principals since 1998. Below is a list of principals.

Ordinal	Officeholder	Term start	Term end	Time in office	Notes
−	John DeCourcy	1998	2006	7–8 years	
−	Nicholas Vidot	2007	2018	10–11 years	
−	Stephen Kennaugh	2019	2026	6–7 years	

== See also ==
- List of Catholic schools in New South Wales
- Catholic Education, Diocese of Parramatta
- Catholic education in Australia
