= St Patrick's Marist College =

St. Patrick's Marist College

Location
- Kissing Point Road, Dundas, New South Wales; Australia; 33°48′1″S 151°2′52″E

Information
- Type: Secondary school
- Motto: Latin: Esto Fidelis (Be Faithful)
- Religious affiliations: Marist Brothers; Association of Marist Schools of Australia
- Denomination: Roman Catholicism
- Established: 8 April 1872; 154 years ago (in The Rocks)
- Educational authority: New South Wales Department of Education
- Oversight: Catholic Education Office, Diocese of Parramatta
- Principal: Paul Ryan
- Years: 7–12
- Enrolment: c. 1100 (2023)
- Colours: Bottle green and gold
- Affiliations: Metropolitan Catholic Schools
- Website: www.stpatsdundas.catholic.edu.au

St. Patrick's Marist College (abbreviated as SPMC) is a private Roman Catholic co-educational secondary school located in Dundas, a suburb of Sydney, New South Wales, Australia.

The college was founded by the Marist Brothers as a primary school catering for boys at Harrington Street in The Rocks in 1872. This leaves the college with the distinction of being the oldest school in Australia under the charge of the teaching Brothers and marks it as Australia's first Marist school. It is also one of the nation's oldest Catholic secondary schools. The College moved to its current site in 1962 and as of today, it provides education for approximately 1,000 students from Year 7 to Year 12.

The college is a member of the Association of Marist Schools of Australia (AMSA) and the Metropolitan Catholic Schools. It is administered by the Catholic Education Office of the Diocese of Parramatta.

== History ==
=== Early days at Harrington Street ===
Arriving in Sydney on 26 February 1872, the Marist Brothers, led by Brother Ludovic, the founder of the Marist Brothers Province in Australia, established a parish school at St Patrick's, Church Hill. The first St Patrick's was a double storied building in Harrington Street, The Rocks which previously had been St Philip's Anglican School. On 8 April 1872, one hundred and thirty primary boys were enrolled in this first Marist school in Australia. St Patrick's has "the distinction of being the oldest school in Australia under the charge of teaching Brothers". By 1875, Brother Ludovic was also able to open a high school at St Patrick's. This was to be the first popular high school for day boys in NSW since the only secondary schools available at the time were boarding schools. Over the years, St Patrick's, Church Hill served as a primary school, high school, intermediate school, business college and evening college. The business college continues to this day as Patrick's College Australia, Sydney .

=== Transition to Dundas ===
With diminishing numbers of residents in the inner city, it was decided to move the campus to Dundas in 1962 The new site retained much of the traditions and customs of the old St Patrick's, thus forging a strong link with the original school at Harrington Street. A number of students also made the move from Harrington Street to Dundas.

The founding Principal on the Dundas site was Brother Thomas More Davidson. He faced the challenges of setting up the new school with great faith and energy. Despite problems such as bad weather holding up the completion of buildings, 110 boys in Years 4, 5 and 6 commenced classes for Term 1, 1962 in the top floor rooms while the builders completed the ground floor. The school was established as a Demonstration Secondary School in 1965 and was named St Patrick's Marist Brothers' Demonstration School. The secondary school, catering for males in Years 7–10 was officially opened on 2 October 1966. The primary school continued at Dundas until 1985 when the last Year 6 class completed their schooling.

1985 marked another historic year for St Patrick's Marist when not only were its first Year 11 students enrolled, but coeducation was introduced in the senior school. The successful transition was built upon the vision and dedication of Principals Brother John O'Brien, Brother William Selden and Brother Ronald Blyth who guided St Patrick's through years of change in response to the needs of the Catholic communities of Dundas and its neighbouring parishes.

The school was renamed St Patrick's Marist College by Brother Michael Procajlo when the first co-educational group was enrolled in Year 7 in 1992.

== Campus ==
The school is located on the corner of Kirby Street and Kissing Point Road in Dundas, a suburb of Sydney. Its main entrance is located on Kirby Street. The college is centred on the Harrington Courtyard, named in honour of the original locale of the school in The Rocks. There are three main ovals and two basketball/netball courts located to the north of the IT wing. The school also contains a covered Senior Yard area, where students from Years 11 and 12 sit at break periods. A new information technology wing was completed a few years ago, and a new multi-purpose centre was also built up near the basketball courts (La Valla Centre). The music centre was refurbished with the addition of a new classroom. In 2020, the original building of the college was demolished to make way for a large new 3-storey building, with state of the art classrooms and learning spaces. A new library was also constructed that year.

== Students ==
There are approximately 1000 students enrolled at St Patrick's Marist College. Upon enrolment at the college, students are divided amongst six homeroom groups: Chavoin (Jeanne Marie Chavoin), Edwin (Brother Edwin Farrell), Ludovic (St Ludovic), Mackillop (Mary MacKillop), Paul (St Paul) and Xavier (Francis Xavier).

== See also ==
- List of Catholic schools in New South Wales
- Catholic education in Australia
