= Bede Polding College =

Location
- South Windsor, Sydney, New South Wales; Australia; 33°37′58″S 150°47′54″E

Information
- Type: Independent co-educational secondary day school
- Motto: Called to Bring Peace
- Denomination: Roman Catholicism
- Established: 1986; 40 years ago
- Educational authority: NSW Department of Education
- Oversight: Catholic Education Office of the Diocese of Parramatta
- Principal: Greg Malone
- Teaching staff: ~100
- Years: 7–12
- Enrolment: ~1,200
- Campus type: Suburban
- Colours: Navy blue, maroon
- Website: www.bedepoldingwindsor.catholic.edu.au

Bede Polding College is an independent Roman Catholic co-educational secondary day school, located in South Windsor, on the north-western outskirts of Sydney, New South Wales, Australia. The school delivers a religious and secular education to approximately 1,200 students from Year 7 to Year 12.

The school is administered by the Catholic Education Office of the Diocese of Parramatta and serves the greater Hawkesbury region and the parishes of St Matthew's, Windsor and Richmond. The school opened in 1986 with 110 pupils and a staff of nine.

The school's patron is John Bede Polding, the inaugural Catholic bishop of Sydney in the Colony of New South Wales.

The college was subject to a devastating fire in late 2003 that resulted in extensive damage to the administration building and teacher study areas.

== Notable alumni ==
- John Allen, teacher, rugby player and cricketer

== Notable staff ==
- Linda Cassell

== See also ==
- List of non-government schools in New South Wales
- List of Catholic schools in New South Wales
- Catholic education in Australia
