= Clancy Catholic College =

Location
- 201 Carmichael Dr, West Hoxton NSW 2171; Australia; 33.9322°S 150.8355°E

Information
- Type: Independent co-educational secondary day school
- Denomination: Roman Catholic
- Established: 2005
- Oversight: Catholic Education, Parramatta Diocese
- Colours: Navy blue and white
- Website: clancy.syd.catholic.edu.au

Clancy Catholic College is an independent Roman Catholic comprehensive co-educational school located in West Hoxton, Australia.

== History ==
The school was founded in 2005 by Cardinal Edward Clancy AC. The college was officially started in 2006 with a group of 55 students.
