= Jano Toussounian =

Australian actor and comedian (born 1991)

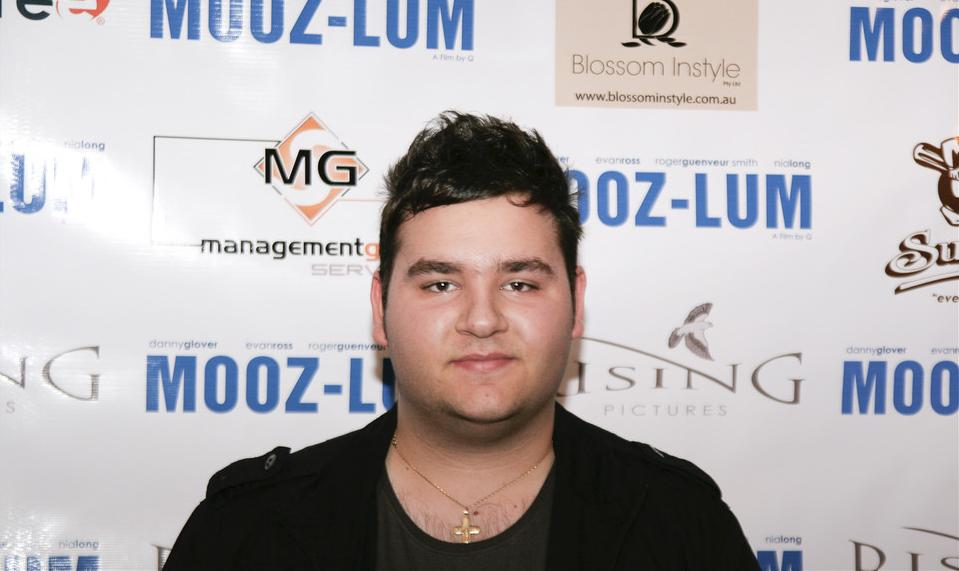
- Born: 25 January 1991 (age 35); Sydney, Australia
- Education: Loyola Senior High School, Mount Druitt
- Occupations: Actor, comedian
- Years active: 2009–present

Jano Toussounian (born 25 January 1991) is an Australian actor and comedian. He is best known for his role as Chase Day in 60 Minutes and Anton Young in Supreme Justice with Judge Karen.

== Early life ==
Toussounian was born in Sydney, Australia. He is of Armenian descent. He attended Loyola Senior High School, Mount Druitt.

== Career ==
After completing school, Toussounian went on to complete various acting courses. It was in 2009 where he starred in his first short film, Unfinished Business. In 2010 he starred in the short films The Coin and No Clue. In 2011 Toussounian graduated from Screenwise Film and Television School completing a two year intensive course.

He appeared in the Australian feature film The Unjudged. This feature marked Toussounian's feature film debut.

He made his television debut by featuring in a Rexona commercial. Toussounian appeared in the MTV pilot Sick playing Chef.

In 2012 Toussounian appeared in a 60 Minutes re-enactment scene about Matthew Milat, nephew of backpacker murderer Ivan Milat; played the role of whistleblower Chase Day. He also appeared in commercials for Rexona Clinical Protection, Foxtel HD, Nature's Own: Bananas, Toyota Corolla, Woodside Oil, and Origin Energy.

In 2013 he was cast in the Australian film Super Awesome! and playing the character of Basil Cherry.

Toussounian appeared in an episode of Supreme Justice with Judge Karen. The episode aired on KCAL-TV/CBS, KDOC-TV and WBBZ-TV.

He also filmed a small role on Maz Jobrani's comedy film Jimmy Vestvood: Amerikan Hero and a role on Tattoo Nightmares, part of Spike. In 2017 he appeared in the ABC television series Man Up.

== Filmography ==
Year	Title	Role	Notes
2009	Unfinished Business	Clive	Short Film
2009	Pictures of Anna	Boy 5	Short Film
2010	The Coin	Nino	Short Film
2010	No Clue	Jack	Short Film
2011	The Unjudged	Simon	Film
2011	Sick	Chef	TV – MTV Australia
2011	Anikiko – Music Video	Stage Manager	Music Video
2012	The Date	Michael	Short Film
2012	60 Minutes (Australian TV program)	Chase Day	TV – Nine Network
2013	Super Awesome!	Basil Cherry	Film
2013	Supreme Justice with Judge Karen	Anton Young	TV – KCAL-TV/CBS and KDOC-TV
2014	Street Talent	Narrator	Documentary
2014	Jimmy Vestvood: Amerikan Hero	Rappers Crew Member	Film
2014	Fight to the Finish	MMA Fan	Film
2014	Tattoo Nightmares	Josh	TV – Spike (TV network)
2015	Shop Your Way	John	Short Film
2016	Flat Battery	Dodgy Car Salesman	Internet
2017	Man Up	Paul	Television – ABC (Australian TV channel)

== See also ==
- List of Armenians
- Armenian Australian
- List of Armenian actors
