= McAuley Catholic College =

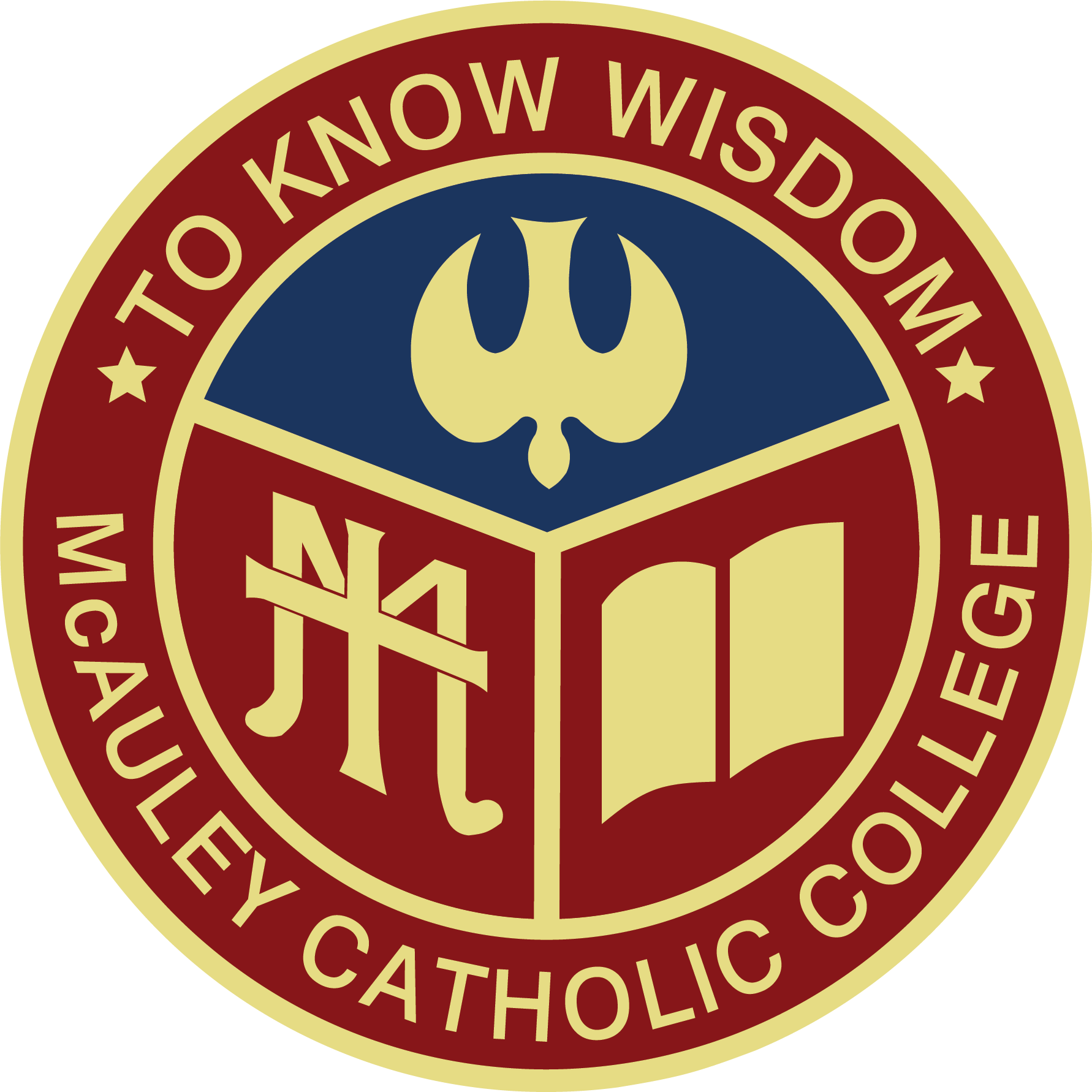

Location
- Grafton, New South Wales; Australia; 29°42′22″S 152°57′23″E

Information
- Type: Independent; co-educational; secondary; day school
- Motto: To Know Wisdom
- Religious affiliation: Australasian Mercy Secondary Schools Association
- Denomination: Roman Catholic
- Established: 1990; 36 years ago
- Oversight: Roman Catholic Diocese of Lismore
- Principal: Kate Thomson
- Chaplain: Joseph Holloway
- Staff: ~60
- Years: 7–12
- Enrolment: c. 550
- Colours: Maroon and navy
- Website: www.grafslism.catholic.edu.au

McAuley Catholic College is an independent Roman Catholic co-educational day school located just outside Grafton in the Northern Rivers area of New South Wales, Australia. It is located on Gumbaynggirr land.

The College is affiliated with the Australasian Mercy Secondary Schools Association (AMSSA) and is administered by the Roman Catholic Diocese of Lismore.

The school was founded in 1990 as, as an amalgamation of St Mary's College, St Aloysius' College and Holy Spirit College. It was named after Catherine McAuley founder of the Sisters of Mercy.

== Principals ==
#	Name	Term start	Term end	Time in office	Notes
1	John Mullins	1990	1995	4–5 years	
2	James McDougall	1996	2001	4–5 years	
3	Gerald Crooks	2002	2008	5–6 years	
4	Leon Walsh	2009	2015	5–6 years	
5	Mark O'Farrell	2016	2018	3 years	
6	Aaron Beach	2019	2019	1 years	
7	Kate Thomson	2020	Incumbent		

== Controversy ==
In 2016, the school received media coverage when during an assembly, principal Mark O'Farrell shared an image of a man holding a sign reading "peace on earth" while standing behind his daughters and wife, who were gagged and tied up. Parents and students complained about the image to the school and an apology was later given.

== Notable alumni ==
- Troy Cassar-Daley, country and western singer
- Jed Holloway, rugby union player
- Verity Simmons, netball player and Australian Rules footballer
- Ursula Stephens, former politician

== See also ==
- List of Catholic schools in New South Wales
- Catholic education in Australia
