= Good Samaritan Catholic College =

Location
- 401 Hoxton Park Road, Hinchinbrook, south-western Sydney, New South Wales; 2168; Australia; 33°55′32″S 150°51′26″E

Information
- Type: Independent comprehensive co-educational secondary day school
- Motto: Journeying with Compassion
- Denomination: Catholic
- Established: 1999; 27 years ago
- Oversight: Sydney Catholic Schools, Archdiocese of Sydney
- Principal: Pablo Grana
- Staff: 152
- Teaching staff: 110
- Years: 7–12
- Enrolment: c. 1,300
- Campus type: Suburban
- Colours: Maroon, green, white and black
- Song: We Will Shine
- Website: www.goodsamaritan.nsw.edu.au

Good Samaritan Catholic College is a Catholic comprehensive co-educational secondary day school, located in Hinchinbrook, a South-Western suburb of Sydney, New South Wales, Australia.

The school was founded in 1999 and named after the Bible passage of "The Good Samaritan".

The school caters for male and female students from Year 7 to Year 12.

== Overview ==
Good Samaritan students are placed into Pastoral Houses upon enrolment, each representing a significant religious figure:

- Chisholm – House patron is Caroline Chisholm, and house colour is Gold.
- De Paul – House patron is St. Vincent de Paul, and house colour is Red.
- La Salle – House patron is St John Baptist de La Salle, and house colour is Blue.
- Mackillop – House patron is St. Mary Mackillop, and house colour is Orange.
- Merici – House patron is St Angela de Merici, and house colour is Green.
- Polding – House patron is Bishop John Bede Polding, and house colour is Purple.

The school community gathers for events such as yearly retreats, years 7 and 9 camps, swimming carnivals, athletics carnivals, Good Samaritan Day, Sydney Catholic Schools sport, cross country and many other sporting, community and school or fund-raising events. The House that accumulates the most points at the end of the year win the House Cup.

== Facilities ==
Good Samaritan Catholic College has been building onto its facilities to create schooling for students more accommodating for their needs. Its facilities include a hall, chapel, library, science laboratories, design and technology centre, photography and art facilities, computer rooms, hospitality kitchen and food technology centre, basketball courts, performance space and music centre, three ovals, synthetic soccer field and environmental seating arrangements for breaks.

== Curriculum ==
=== Basic key learning areas ===
Basic key learning areas include Religious Education, English, Mathematics, Science, History and Geography, and Personal Development, Health and Physical Education.

=== Other subjects ===
Other subjects include Visual Arts (Year 7 to 8), Italian (Year 8), Music (Year 7 to 8), and Technology (Year 7 to 8).

=== Electives ===
For students in Years 9 and 10, they may select two of the following subjects to study during Year 9 to 10: Food Technology, Tech Wood, Design and Technology, Commerce, Work Education, Music, PASS, Graphics, Visual Arts, Visual Design, Photography, Drama, and Computing Technology.

For students in Years 11 and 12, they may select the following subjects for the Higher School Certificate: English (Standard, Advanced, ESL, Fundamentals), Mathematics (Standard I, Standard II, Advanced, Extension 1 and 2), Biology, Chemistry, Physics, Investigating Science, Earth and Environmental Science, Ancient History, Business Studies, Economics, Legal Studies, Modern History, Studies in Catholic Thought, Studies of Religion I and II, Music, Visual Art, Design and Technology, Information Processes and Technology, Business Services, Hospitality Operations, Personal Development, Health, Physical Education, Dance Sport Lifestyle, Community and Family Studies, Sport Lifestyle and Recreation, and Photography.

== See also ==
- List of Catholic schools in New South Wales
- Archdiocese of Sydney
- Catholic education in Australia
