= Vincent Long Van Nguyen =

Australian Catholic bishop (born 1961)

The Most Reverend Vincent Long Van Nguyen OFMConv
- Bishop of Parramatta
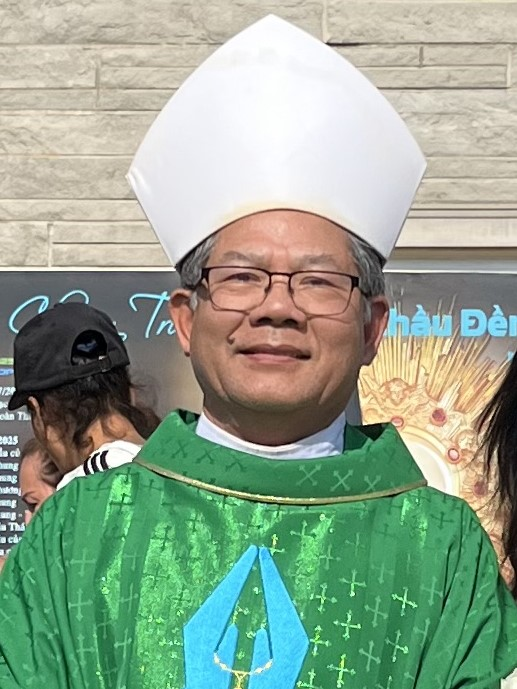
- Nguyen in 2025 at the Marian Days pilgrimage in Carthage, Missouri.
- Native name: Vinh Sơn Nguyễn Văn Long
- See: Parramatta
- Appointed: 5 May 2016
- Installed: 16 June 2016
- Predecessor: Anthony Fisher OP
- Previous post: Auxiliary Bishop of Melbourne & Titular Bishop of Thala (2011–2016)

Orders
- Ordination: 30 December 1989 by George Pell
- Consecration: 23 June 2011 by Denis Hart
- Rank: Bishop

Personal details
- Born: 3 December 1961 (age 64) Gia Kiệm, Biên Hòa, Republic of Việt Nam
- Residence: Saint Patrick's Cathedral, Parramatta
- Education: Melbourne College of Divinity; Pontifical University of St. Bonaventure
- Motto: Duc in altum (Go out into the deep) (Hãy ra khơi)
- Styles
- Reference style: His Lordship; The Most Reverend
- Spoken style: My Lord
- Religious style: Bishop

Vincent Long Van Nguyen (born 3 December 1961) is an Australian prelate of the Catholic Church. He was appointed the fourth Bishop of Parramatta by Pope Francis on 5 May 2016. He has been a bishop since 2011 after serving for several years in the leadership of the Conventual Franciscans, first in Australia and later in Rome. He is Australia's first Asian-born bishop and the first Vietnamese-born bishop to head a diocese outside of Vietnam.

== Early life and emigration ==
Nguyễn Văn Long was born on 3 December 1961 in Gia Kiệm, Biên Hòa, South Vietnam. Nguyen's parents were refugees from North Vietnam fleeing communism in 1954. He is the fourth in a family of four brothers and two sisters.

In 1972, Nguyen entered a St Paul’s Minor Seminary of the Diocese of Xuân Lộc, which was 60 kilometers north of Saigon, to begin studies for the priesthood before it was disbanded and turned into a barracks of the "Liberation Army".

In 1979, following the Fall of Saigon, Nguyen fled Vietnam by boat as a refugee, joining two of his brothers who had previously left for Holland. There were more people on the boat than anticipated, and so to avoid the danger of the boat sinking, the group had to get rid of all their belongings and necessary supplies for the journey.

After a week at sea, he and his group landed in a refugee camp in Malaysia. It was there that he taught himself English and then began to teach others as well, which cemented his desire to serve as a priest. After spending approximately 16 months in the refugee camp, he was resettled in Springvale, Australia in 1980.

== Career ==
=== Early Franciscan career ===
After settling in Springvale and being impressed by the work of the friars there, he entered the Order of Friars Minor Conventuals (Conventual Franciscans) in 1983 and undertook priestly formation in Melbourne. He completed a baccalaureate in theology (Bachelor of Theology) at the Melbourne College of Divinity in 1989 and was ordained a priest on 30 December 1989 by George Pell. Nguyen later obtained a licentiate in spirituality and Christology from the Pontifical University of St. Bonaventure (Seraphicum) in Rome in 1994.

Nguyen served in parish ministry in Springvale (1990–1992), Kellyville (1999–2002), and again in Springvale (2002–2008). Within his religious order, he was Director of Postulants in Australia (1994–1998) and Custodial Vicar (1995–2005).

In 2005, he was elected superior of the Conventual Franciscans in Australia. From 2008 to 2011, he served in Rome as Assistant General of the order, with responsibility for the Asia–Oceania region.

=== Episcopal ministry ===
On 20 May 2011, Pope Benedict XVI appointed him Auxiliary Bishop of Melbourne and Titular Bishop of Thala. He was consecrated on 23 June 2011 at St Patrick's Cathedral, Melbourne, by Archbishop Denis Hart, with Archbishop Giuseppe Lazzarotto, Apostolic Nuncio, and Cardinal George Pell as co-consecrators.

He chose as his episcopal motto the Latin phrase Duc in altum (“Go out into the deep”), taken from Luke 5:4 and traditionally associated with the miraculous catch of fish, symbolising the Church’s missionary task. On his coat of arms appears a depiction of the Flag of South Vietnam, a direct reference with "gold and red wavy bands".

In Melbourne, he served as Episcopal Vicar for Justice and Peace and for Social Services, and chaired the Catholic Education Commission. Within the Australian Catholic Bishops Conference, he has served as Bishops Delegate for Migrants and Refugees, Chair of the Australian Catholic Social Justice Council, and as a member of its Permanent Committee.

On 5 May 2016, Pope Francis appointed him Bishop of Parramatta. He was installed on 16 June 2016 at St Patrick's Cathedral, Parramatta.

=== Views and public engagement ===
Nguyen has frequently spoken on issues of ecclesial reform, social justice and inclusion. In August 2016, he delivered the Ann D Clark Lecture titled “Pope Francis and the challenges of the Church today”. He described the Church as being at a “watershed moment”, “always in need of reform”, and called for “a Church that dares to risk the new frontier rather than a Church that is anchored in a safe harbour”. Drawing on themes associated with liberation theology and the teaching of Pope Francis, he spoke of accompaniment, mercy, opposition to clericalism, and the need for “ecclesial inclusiveness” as a “big tent Church”.

Addressing social issues, he stated that the Church could not credibly advocate for the integrity of creation and universal love while appearing inconsistent on matters affecting racial minorities, women and homosexual persons. He criticised the language describing homosexual orientation as “intrinsically disordered” as pastorally ineffective, particularly among younger people. The Australian reported his remarks under the headline “Catholic bishop calls on Church to accept homosexuality”, with additional international coverage. Nguyen subsequently stated that his remarks had been misrepresented, clarifying that affirming the dignity of gay and lesbian persons did not entail altering Catholic moral teaching.

On 21 February 2017, he testified before the Royal Commission into Institutional Responses to Child Sexual Abuse. During his testimony, he disclosed that he had been sexually abused by clergy after arriving in Australia, despite being an adult at the time. He identified clericalism, the isolation of clergy from lay oversight, and the marginalisation of women within Church structures as contributing factors to patterns of abuse. He also questioned traditional clerical titles and practices, such as kissing a bishop’s ring, describing them as reinforcing unhealthy power distance between clergy and laity. His testimony was applauded by survivors and their advocates.

In August 2017, addressing the National Council of Priests, he stated that the Church required “new wine in new wineskins” rather than superficial reform, criticising triumphalism, authoritarianism and clerical superiority. He argued that diminishing priestly numbers could be an opportunity for renewal rather than decline.

During the 2017 Australian Marriage Law Postal Survey, Nguyen did not instruct Catholics in his diocese to oppose the legalisation of same-sex marriage. In a pastoral letter dated 13 September 2017, he affirmed Catholic teaching that marriage is a sacramental union between one man and one woman, while stating that individuals were free to make their own decision in the civil survey. He encouraged respectful dialogue and acknowledged the tensions experienced by Catholics with same-sex attracted family members, calling for greater affirmation of human dignity and pastoral accompaniment.

== Notes ==
Catholic Church titles
Preceded by Anthony Fisher O.P.	Bishop of Parramatta; 2016–present	Incumbent
