= Our Lady of Mercy College, Parramatta =

Our Lady of Mercy College
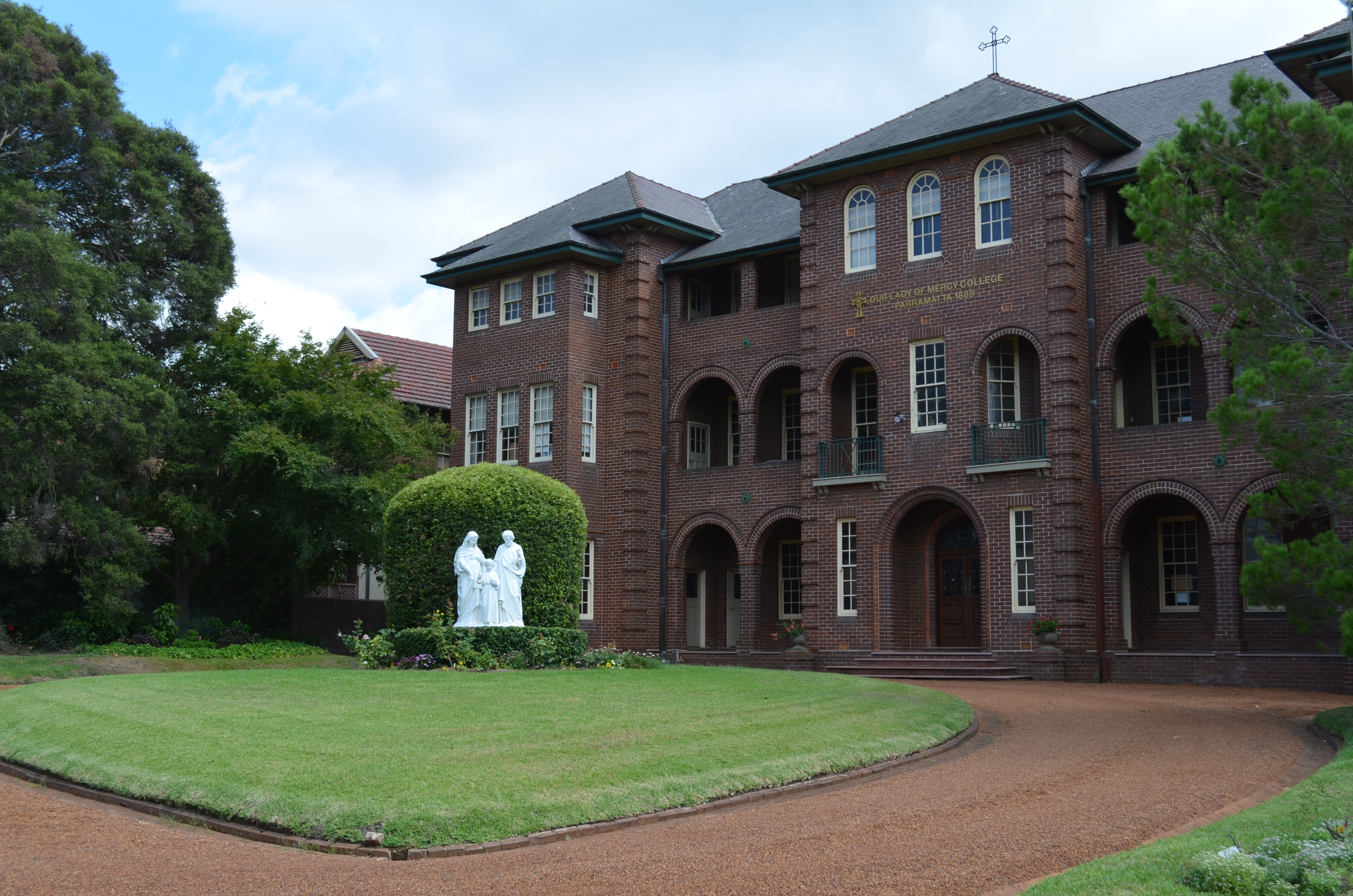
- The front lawn and main administration building of Our Lady of Mercy College

Location
- Parramatta, Sydney, New South Wales; Australia; 33°48′28″S 151°00′12″E

Information
- Type: Independent single-sex secondary day school
- Motto: Latin: Sub tuum praesidium (Under Your Protection)
- Religious affiliation: Sisters of Mercy
- Denomination: Catholicism
- Established: 1889; 137 years ago
- Educational authority: New South Wales Department of Education
- Oversight: Catholic Education Office, Diocese of Parramatta
- Chairman: Kerrie Walshaw
- Principal: Lucie Farrugia
- Employees: ~76
- Years: 7–12
- Gender: Girls
- Enrolment: ~1,030 (2007)
- Colours: Blue and white
- Slogan: Educating girls in the Mercy tradition
- Affiliations: Combined Catholic Colleges; Catholic Girls Secondary Schools Sporting Association; Alliance of Girls' Schools Australasia; Australasian Mercy Secondary Schools Association; Association of Heads of Independent Schools of Australia; Association of Heads of Independent Girls' Schools
- Website: www.olmc.nsw.edu.au

Our Lady of Mercy College, Parramatta (abbreviated as OLMC Parramatta), is a leading Catholic Independent Girls' High School, located in Parramatta, a western suburb of Sydney, New South Wales, Australia.

Established in 1889 in the Mercy tradition, the College caters for approximately 1,030 students from Year 7 to Year 12.

OLMC is affiliated with the Combined Catholic Colleges, the Catholic Girls Secondary Schools Sporting Association, the Alliance of Girls' Schools Australasia, the Australasian Mercy Secondary Schools Association (AMSSA), the Association of Heads of Independent Schools of Australia (AHISA), and an affiliate member of the Association of Heads of Independent Girls' Schools (AHIGS).

== History ==
The college was founded by a group of Mercy sisters from Callan, County Kilkenny, Ireland. The Sisters of Mercy were invited to establish a Catholic school in Parramatta. Mother Mary Clare Dunphy led the sea voyage from Ireland to Australia in 1888.

In 1889, the College opened on the Villiers Street site with seven pupils. At the time, it was called St Mary's High School and consisted of one building. During this time, Mother Mary Clare Dunphy held the position of Pioneer Superior. The College's Pioneer Principal was Mother Mary Clare Alacoque.

The College opened its doors to boarders in 1893 with May McGovern, a 10-year old orphan, accepted as the first boarding student.

In 1899, construction began on a two-storey wing to replace the old building on the northern side of the Convent and the school building on Villiers Street. The ground floor consisted of one long room for classes with the first floor used as a boarders' dormitory.

OLMC was one of the first schools in New South Wales to be registered for the Bursary Endowment Act in 1913, which introduced the more competitive exam orientated approach to education of the Intermediate and Leaving Certificate years. The first group of students sat for the Leaving Certificate in 1914.

In 1922, Dorrie Murphy convinced Mother Francis Kearney to support the foundation of an Ex-Students' Association. As well as being a way of maintaining school friendships, the Association raised funds for the charitable works of the Sisters. Dorrie is also credited with penning the words of the school song, "The Alma Mater", to the tune of a popular beer hall song. The tradition of the Ex-students' Association was extended in 2004 when the OLMC Parramatta Alumnae Association was created. This was a direct result of the incorporation of the college and the appointment of a board of directors in 2002 by the trustees of the Sisters of Mercy Parramatta.

By 1929, the expansion of the school led to the erection of a new building in order to accommodate the 150 borders and 200 day pupils. This building has been named 'The Brigid Shelly Building' in recognition of one of the early Sisters. Further expansion has taken place over the years as more land has become available. Major building occurred in 1939, 1967 ('Francis Kearney Building', 1969 'Catherine McAuley Library and Hall') and 1994 ('Martha O'Sullivan Technology Wing'). There has also been refurbishment in recent years. The hall was refurbished and named 'The Edith Angel Hall' in 2006 in recognition of the leadership of Sister Edith Angel during the 1960s. A master plan which includes building works began in 2007.

In 1955, the primary school was phased out and the boarding school closed at the end of 1974. This was to help the college update its facilities for the implementation of the Wyndham Scheme. This new education policy made the subject of Science compulsory for all students to the end of Year 10, and introduced another year to the high school program so that it now covered six years instead of five.

In 1996, the college was set alight by the same arsonist who set fire to Saint Patrick's Cathedral minutes before. The fire in the school was discovered in time and put out with little damage done.

In 2002, the college was incorporated and the first Board of Directors was appointed, with Geraldine Star as the first College Chair. In 2004, Kitty Guerin was appointed the eighth and first lay Principal of the College.

In 2010 a new building was constructed - the Janet Woods Building, named after a former principal of the college and science teacher, Sister Janet Woods. The building provides facilities in science, food technology and hospitality, and a library, senior study and canteen.

== Principals ==
Term	Officeholder
1889-1908	Sister Mary Alocoque Kavanagh
1909–1933	Mother Mary Frances Kearney
1934–1945	Mother Mary Alphonsus Stanley
1946–1965	Sr Mary Gonzaga Stanley
1966–1977	Sr Edith Angel
1978–1989	Sr Janet Woods
1990–2004	Sr Ailsa Mackinnon
2004–2013	Mrs Kitty Guerin
2014–2020	Mr Stephen Walsh
2021–current	Ms Lucie Farrugia

== Notable alumnae ==
- Maddison Brown – Australian actress and model
- Helena Carr (née John) – businesswoman
- Sheila Cassidy – human rights activist; arrested and tortured in Chile in the 1970s
- Rosemary Goldie – Australian Roman Catholic theologian and the first woman to serve in an executive role in the Roman Curia
- Alison Megarrity – ALP member for Menai in the New South Wales Legislative Assembly
- Michelle Rowland – ALP member for Greenway in the Australian House of Representatives

== See also ==
- List of Catholic schools in New South Wales
- Catholic Education, Diocese of Parramatta
- Catholic education in Australia
