= John Allen (sportsman, born 1974) =

Australian-born first-class cricketer

Personal information
- Full name: John Aubrey Allen
- Born: 19 July 1974 (age 52); Windsor, New South Wales, Australia
- Batting: Right-handed

Domestic team information
- Years: Team
- 2003: Oxford University

Career statistics
Competition	First-class
Matches	2
Runs scored	0
Batting average	0.00
100s/50s	0/0
Top score	0
Catches/stumpings	0/–
- Source: CricketArchive, 5 August 2008

John Aubrey Allen (born 19 July 1974) is an Australian teacher, rugby player and cricketer.

Allen was born in Windsor, New South Wales. He attended Bede Polding College in South Windsor, before graduating with a BA in human movement studies at the University of Technology Sydney, where he also completed his Diploma of Education. He played rugby for several clubs, most notably for the Brumbies who he represented in the Ricoh Championship. He also played Grade cricket for Hawkesbury Cricket Club near Sydney. At 21, he moved to England to study for his master's degree at University College, Oxford. While at Oxford, Allen was awarded his blue in rugby union and cricket.

Allen played as a centre in rugby union and as a forward in rugby league. He captained Oxford University RFC in 2003, leading the team to a draw in The Varsity Match against Cambridge at Twickenham in December that year. Earlier in the year, he scored a try late in the game to seal Oxford's victory in the Rugby League Varsity Match at the Athletic Ground, Richmond.

For Oxford University Cricket Club, he played in two first-class matches, including the varsity match.

After completing his master's, Allen returned to teaching in Australia and in 2017 was working as Director of Sport and Co-Curricular at Trinity Grammar School in Sydney, New South Wales.
