= Nathan McMillan =

Australian rugby league footballer

Personal information
- Full name: Nathan McMillan
- Born: 18 August 1983 (age 41)

Playing information
- Position: Prop
Club
| Years | Team | Pld | T | G | FG | P |
|---|---|---|---|---|---|---|
| 2003 | Parramatta Eels | 1 | 0 | 0 | 0 | 0 |

Nathan McMillan (born 18 August 1983) is an Australian former professional rugby league footballer who played as a prop for the Parramatta Eels in the NRL in 2003.

== Playing career ==
McMillan joined the Parramatta Eels in the 2003 season. He made his lone first grade appearance from the bench in his sides' 36−34 loss to the Manly-Warringah Sea Eagles at Brookvale Oval in round 10 of the 2003 season. He was released by the club at the end of the 2003 season and subsequently never played first grade rugby league again.
