= Skennars Head, New South Wales =

Skennars Head
- Town
- Coordinates: 28°49′39″S 153°36′7″E
- Country: Australia
- State: New South Wales
- LGA: Ballina Shire

Government
  - State electorate: Ballina
  - Federal division: Richmond

Population
  - Total: 1,303 (2021 census)
- Postcode: 2478

Skennars Head is a town in the Northern Rivers Region of New South Wales. It sits within the Ballina Shire local government area and is 7 kilometres (4.3 mi) from the regional centre of Ballina.

It is on the lands of the Bundjalung people, who are the traditional owners of this region.

== Origin of place name ==
Skennars Head is named after the nearby headland of the same name which was named for John Frederick Skenner who selected this land in the 1840s. Skennar is considered one of the earliest pioneers in the lower Richmond area and he erected one of the first sugar mills in the region in 1869; he was also involved in timber milling and grew and manufactured arrowroot.

== Demographics ==
As of the 2021 Australian census, 1,303 people resided in Skennars Head, up from 1,158 in the 2016 census. The median age of persons in Skennars Head was 47 years. There were more males than females, with 50.3% of the population male and 49.7% female. The average household size was 2.1 people per household.
