= St Patrick's Cathedral, Parramatta =

Catholic cathedral in Australia

- Saint Patrick's Cathedral
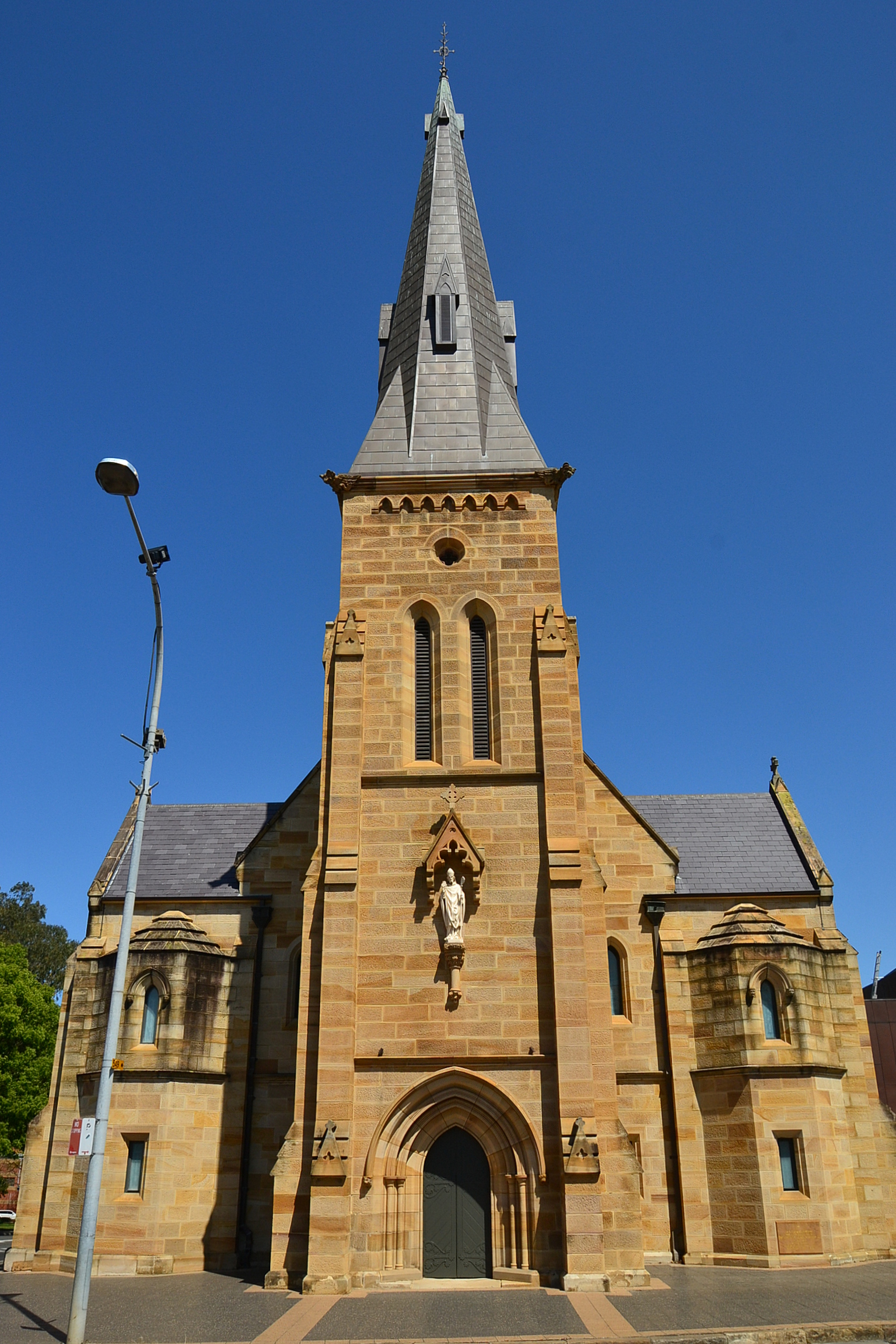
- Spire and main facade of St Patrick's Cathedral, now a chapel
- St Patrick's Cathedral, Parramatta
- 33°48′32″S 151°00′13″E
- Address: Parramatta, Sydney, New South Wales
- Country: Australia
- Denomination: Roman Catholic
- Website: stpatscathedral.com.au

History
- Status: Church (1836 – 1986); Cathedral (since 1986); Chapel (Old cathedral partially destroyed by 1996 fire)
- Founded: 17 March 1836 (as St Patrick's Church)
- Founder: Bishop Bede Polding
- Consecrated: 28 May 1837 (as St Patrick's Church); 13 August 1954; 29 November 2003 by Cardinal Edward Clancy (as St Patrick's Cathedral)

Architecture
- Functional status: Completed
- Architects: A.W.N. Pugin (1856); Romaldo Giurgola (2003)
- Architectural type: Church
- Style: Gothic Revival (1856 building)
- Completed: 29 November 2003 (rebuild following fire)

Administration
- Diocese: Parramatta

Clergy
- Bishop: Vincent Long Van Nguyen OFMConv
- Dean: Robert Riedling

St Patrick's Cathedral, Parramatta is the Catholic cathedral church of the Diocese of Parramatta and the seat of the Catholic Bishop, located in Parramatta, New South Wales, Australia, currently Vincent Long Van Nguyen OFMConv.

Established as a church in 1836, the site was modified several times and consecrated as a cathedral in 1986. Destroyed by a 1996 fire, the old St Patrick's Cathedral became a Blessed Sacrament Chapel and adjoining it is a large contemporary Cathedral, completed in 2003.

== History ==
With origins of the first Mass occurring on the present-day site of the cathedral dating from 1803, St Patrick's was extensively rebuilt after a 1996 fire devastated the original church that was established in 1854.

A tower was built on the original St Patrick's Church which was consecrated in 1880 and blessed in 1883. A cast bronze bell was installed in the tower in 1904. As the needs of the parish grew, a new church was built on the site in 1936 incorporating the existing tower and spire. When the Diocese of Parramatta was established in 1986, St Patrick's Church was designated as St Patrick's Cathedral.

== Redesign and works following fire ==
Under Bishop Kevin Manning and Dean Peter G. Williams, the building was designed by Romaldo Giurgola and the firm MGT Architects. Giurgola was commissioned in 1997 for the restoration and design of a new cathedral complex after a fire destroyed the previous building. Giurgola was the architect of the new Australian Parliament House in Canberra.

A program of major artworks, crafts and special designs for the cathedral was also undertaken at the same time so that the art, architecture and furnishings of the new cathedral would be in harmony. The commissioned artists included Sydney sculptor Anne Ferguson (who worked in stone), Tasmanian designer Kevin Perkins (who worked in timber) and Sydney sculptor and jewellery designer Robin Blau (who worked in metal). The new Parramatta Cathedral was consecrated on 29 November 2003 by Cardinal Edward Clancy.

The building design and construction team were awarded the 2003 Sir Zelman Cowen Award for Public Buildings by the Australian Institute of Architects.

=== Organ ===
The Norman and Beard late-Victorian English romantic pipe organ, built in 1898, was installed in 2006. This 19th-century organ was transferred from St Saviour's Anglican Church in Knightsbridge, London. Stephen Bicknell designed a new organ case in collaboration with Romaldo Giurgola and the instrument was restored and installed in Parramatta Cathedral by Peter Jewkes and Associates. The organ specifications were further enhanced in 2014 with the addition of several digital ranks of pedal pipes, including 32' Contra-Bourdon, 32' Contra-ophicleide, 16' Major bass; and additional switching devices for the transfer of swell reeds to pedal.

== See also ==
- St Patrick's Cemetery, North Parramatta
