= Catholic education in the Diocese of Parramatta =

There has been Catholic education in the Diocese of Parramatta since the first catholic school was established in the Parramatta area in 1820. There are 80 Catholic systemic schools in the diocese (58 of which are primary and 22 secondary) with a total student population of around 43,000 and a staff population of around 5,000. There are also six non-systemic or congregational (independent) Catholic schools.

== History ==
=== Early expansion ===
A growing population saw many schools open in the years before the Second World War. Built and staffed without government financial assistance, the schools served Catholic communities in Blacktown, East Granville, Guildford, Katoomba and Castle Hill.

=== Baby-boom years ===
Australia's population grew rapidly in the 1950s and 1960s. An ambitious school building program was successfully pursued to cater for new families in many developing areas, including Lalor Park, Seven Hills, Westmead and Kingswood.

=== Government support ===
Some financial relief came to Catholic schools in the 1960s with the funding of science and library facilities. However it was the 1970s that brought a new era of Australian Government funding for all Australian schools, based on the principles of equality and diversity.

Many new schools opened in the decades that followed. These served numerous parishes, including Winston Hills, North Rocks, Kenthurst, Cranebrook and St Clair.

== Education ==
=== Schools ===
- Bede Polding College, Windsor South
- Bethany Catholic Primary, Glenmore Park
- Caroline Chisholm College, Glenmore Park
- Catherine McAuley, Westmead
- CathWest Innovation College, Mt Druitt/ Emu Plains
- Cerdon College, Merrylands
- Chisholm Catholic Primary, Bligh Park
- Christ the King Primary, North Rocks
- Corpus Christi Primary, Cranebrook
- Delany College, Granville
- Emmaus Catholic College, Kemps Creek
- Gilroy College, Castle Hill
- Good Shepherd Primary, Plumpton
- Holy Cross Primary, Glenwood
- Holy Family Primary, Granville East
- Holy Family Primary, Emerton
- Holy Family Primary, Luddenham
- Holy Spirit Primary, St Clair
- Holy Trinity Primary, Granville
- Marian Catholic College, Kenthurst
- Mary Immaculate Primary, Quakers Hill
- Mary MacKillop Primary, Penrith South
- Penola Catholic College, Emu Plains
- Nagle College, Blacktown South
- Our Lady of Lebanon College – Primary, Harris Park
- Our Lady of Lebanon College – Secondary, Harris Park
- Our Lady of Lourdes Primary, Baulkham Hills South
- Our Lady of Lourdes Primary, Seven Hills
- Our Lady of Mercy College, Parramatta
- Our Lady of Mt Carmel Primary, Wentworthville
- Our Lady of the Angels, Rouse Hill
- Our Lady of the Nativity Primary, Lawson
- Our Lady of the Rosary Primary, Kellyville
- Our Lady of the Rosary Primary, St Marys
- Our Lady of the Way Primary, Emu Plains
- Our Lady Queen of Peace Primary, Greystanes
- Parramatta Marist High, Westmead
- Patrician Brothers' College, Blacktown
- Patrician Brothers' College, Fairfield
- Sacred Heart Primary, Mount Druitt South
- Sacred Heart Primary, Westmead
- Santa Sophia Catholic College, Gables
- St Agnes Catholic High, Rooty Hill
- St Aidan's Primary, Rooty Hill
- St Andrews College, Marayong
- St Andrews College, Marayong – Holy Family Campus, Marayong
- St Andrews College, Marayong – John Paul II Campus, Marayong
- St Andrews Primary, Marayong
- St Angela's Primary, Castle Hill
- St Anthony's Primary, Girraween
- St Bernadette's Primary, Castle Hill
- St Bernadette's Primary, Lalor Park
- St Bernadette's Primary, Dundas
- St Canice's Primary, Katoomba
- St Clare's Catholic High, Hassall Grove
- St Columba's Catholic College, Springwood
- St Dominic's College, Penrith
- St Finbar's Primary, Glenbrook
- St Francis of Assisi Primary, Glendenning
- St Gabriel's School for Hearing Impaired Children, Castle Hill
- St John Paul II Catholic College – Nirimba Campus, Quakers Hill
- St John Paul II Catholic College – Schofields Campus, Schofields
- St John XXIII Catholic College, Stanhope Gardens
- St John Vianney's Primary, Doonside
- St John's Primary, Riverstone
- St Joseph's Primary, Kingswood
- St Joseph's Primary, Schofields
- St Luke's Catholic College, Marsden Park
- St Madeleine's Primary, Kenthurst
- St Margaret Mary's Primary, Merrylands
- St Mary's Primary, Rydalmere
- St Matthew's Primary, Windsor
- St Michael's Primary, Baulkham Hills
- St Michael's Primary, Blacktown South
- St Monica's Primary, North Parramatta
- St Monica's Primary, Richmond
- St Nicholas of Myra Primary, Penrith
- St Oliver's Primary, Harris Park
- St Patrick's Marist College, Dundas
- St Patrick's Primary, Guildford
- St Patrick's Primary, Parramatta
- St Patrick's Primary, Blacktown
- St Paul the Apostle Primary, Winston Hills
- St Pauls Catholic College, Greystanes
- St Thomas Aquinas Primary, Springwood
- Trinity Catholic Primary, Kemps Creek
- Xavier Catholic College, Llandilo

=== Executive Director ===
The executive director of schools in the Parramatta Diocese is Jack de Groot. Mr de Groot brings significant leadership experience in senior governance roles in healthcare, aid, tertiary education and social services where he has demonstrated a strong focus on Catholic values, social outreach and mission.

=== Bishop ===
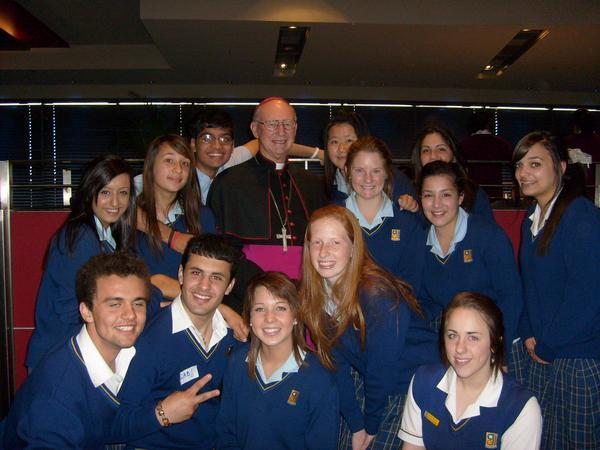
Bishop Kevin Manning with students from Gilroy College

Most Reverend Vincent Long Van Nguyen OFM Conv DD STL is the third Bishop of Parramatta. Appointed on 5 May 2016, Bishop Vincent was installed as the fourth Bishop of Parramatta at St Patrick's Cathedral, Parramatta on 16 June 2016.

=== Enrolment ===
Catholic Schools Parramatta Diocese accept enrolments from students who are not Catholic. All students enrolled in a Catholic school should be willing to participate in the religious activities of the school.

In the Parramatta Diocese, enrolment preference is given, in order, to:

1. children of Catholic families who live in the local parish
2. children of Catholic families from other parishes
3. non-Catholics, in accordance to the school's enrolment vacancies

Siblings of children already enrolled in the school are considered by the same criteria above. However, within each of these categories, a sibling of a child already enrolled has preference over an applicant who does not have a sibling enrolled in the school.

Special consideration may be given to children of non-Catholic families for a number of reasons, after discussion with the school principal.

=== Funding ===
Catholic Schools Parramatta Diocese schools are funded by the Australian and NSW governments, as well as through modest school fees and fundraising.

== See also ==
- Roman Catholic Diocese of Parramatta
- List of Catholic schools in New South Wales
