= Diocese of Parramatta =

Catholic ecclesiastical territory

Diocese of Parramatta Dioecesis Parramattensis
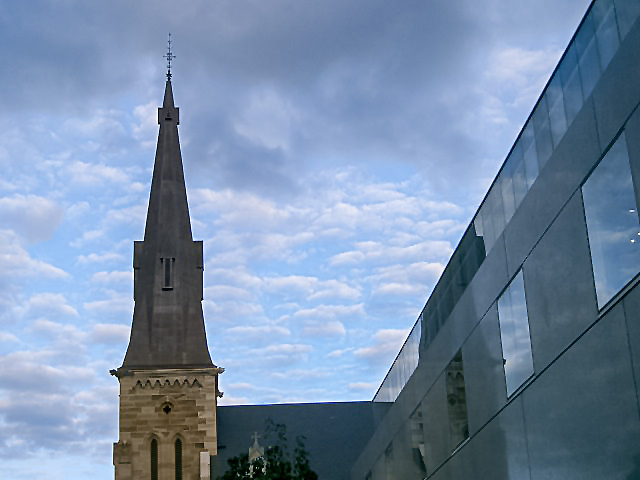
- St Patrick's Cathedral, Parramatta; consecrated in 1837; devastated by fire in 1996; rededicated in 2003

Location
- Country: Australia
- Territory: Western suburbs of Sydney, New South Wales and Blue Mountains
- Metropolitan: Archdiocese of Sydney
- Coordinates: 33°48′29″S 151°00′16″E

Statistics
- Area: 4,289 km^{2} (1,656 sq mi)
- Population: Total; Catholics: (as of 2004); 924,621; ▲330,000 (▼33.2%)
- Parishes: 47

Information
- Denomination: Catholic
- Sui iuris church: Latin Church
- Rite: Roman Rite
- Established: 8 April 1986
- Cathedral: St Patrick's Cathedral

Current leadership
- Pope: Leo XIV
- Bishop: Vincent Long Van Nguyen OFMConv
- Metropolitan Archbishop: Anthony Fisher OP
- Vicar General: Very Rev Peter Williams

Map

Website
- parracatholic.org

The Diocese of Parramatta is a suffragan Latin Church diocese of the Archdiocese of Sydney, established in 1986.

The diocese has responsibility for the western suburbs of Sydney and the Blue Mountains, in New South Wales.

St Patrick's Cathedral, Parramatta is the seat of the Catholic Bishop of Parramatta. On 5 May 2016, Pope Francis appointed Vincent Long Van Nguyen, OFMConv, to be its fourth bishop. His installation took place on 16 June 2016.

== History ==
The diocese is located in one of the fastest-growing areas of New South Wales. The diocese is west of Sydney and reaches from Dundas Valley, west to Katoomba, south to Luddenham, and north to Richmond. The diocese was established on 8 April 1986 from the western part of the Archdiocese of Sydney. and by 2004 served 307,392 parishioners out of a total population of 924,621.

== Bishops ==
=== Bishops of Parramatta ===
The following prelates have served as Bishop of Parramatta:

Order	Name	Date enthroned	Reign ended	Term of office	Reason for term end
1	Bede Vincent Heather	8 April 1986	10 July 1997	11 years, 93 days	Resigned; Bishop Emeritus of Parramatta. Resides on the Central Coast.
2	Kevin Michael Manning	10 July 1997	8 January 2010	12 years, 182 days	Retired; Bishop Emeritus of Parramatta.
3	Anthony Fisher, OP	8 January 2010	12 November 2014	4 years, 253 days	Appointed Archbishop of Sydney
4	Vincent Long Van Nguyen, OFM Conv.	16 June 2016		9 years, 262 days	

=== Other priest of this diocese who became bishop ===
- Robert Michael McGuckin, appointed Bishop of Toowoomba in 2012

== Cathedral ==
With origins of the first Mass occurring on the present-day site of the cathedral going back to 1803, St Patrick's was extensively rebuilt after a 1996 fire devastated the original church established in 1854. A tower was built on the original St Patrick's Church, which was consecrated in 1880 and blessed in 1883. A cast bronze bell was installed in the tower in 1904. As the needs of the parish grew, a new church was built on the site in 1936, incorporating the existing tower and spire. When the Diocese of Parramatta was established in 1986, St Patrick's Church was designated as St Patrick's Cathedral. The fire of 1996 completely devastated the cathedral, leaving only the bell tower and sandstone walls. A completely new cathedral was rebuilt adjacent to the historic fire ravaged site. Designed in consultation with Romaldo Giurgola, the new cathedral, completed in 2003, has won the Sir Zelman Cowen Award for Public Buildings from the Australian Institute of Architects.

== Parishes ==
There are 47 parishes and one parochial district located in the Diocese of Parramatta within five deaneries.

=== Central Deanery ===
- Blacktown – Mary, Queen of the Family Parish
- Doonside – St John Vianney Parish
- Greystanes – Our Lady Queen of Peace Parish
- Lalor Park – St Bernadette's Parish
- Marayong – St Andrew's Parish
- Plumpton – The Good Shepherd Parish
- Quakers Hill-Schofields – Mary Immaculate Parish
- Rooty Hill – St Aidan's Parish
- Seven Hills – Our Lady of Lourdes Parish
- Toongabbie – St Anthony of Padua Parish
- Wentworthville – Our Lady of Mt Carmel Parish

=== Blue Mountains Deanery ===
- Blackheath – Sacred Heart Parish
- Emu Plains – Our Lady of the Way Parish
- Glenbrook – St Finbar's Parish
- Lawson – Our Lady of the Nativity Parish
- Springwood – St Thomas Aquinas Parish
- Upper Blue Mountains – St Mary of the Cross Mackillop Parish

=== Northern Deanery ===
- Baulkham Hills – St Michael's Parish
- Castle Hill – St Bernadette's Parish
- Glenwood–Stanhope Gardens – St John XXIII Parish
- Kellyville – Our Lady of The Rosary Parish
- Kenthurst – St Madeleine Sophie Barat Parish
- North Rocks – Christ the King Parish
- Rouse Hill – Our Lady of the Angels Parish
- Winston Hills – St Paul the Apostle Parish

=== Eastern Deanery ===
- Dundas Valley – St Bernadette's Parish
- Granville – Holy Trinity Parish
- Granville East – Holy Family Parish
- Guildford – St Patrick's Parish
- Harris Park – St Oliver Plunkett's Parish
- Merrylands – St Margaret Mary's Parish
- Parramatta – St Patrick's Cathedral Parish
- Parramatta North – St Monica's Parish
- Rydalmere – Holy Name of Mary Parish
- Westmead – Sacred Heart Parish

=== Western Deanery ===
- Cranebrook – Corpus Christi Parish
- Glenmore Park – Padre Pio Parish
- Kingswood – St Joseph's Parish
- Luddenham–Warragamba – Sacred Heart Parish
- Mt Druitt – Holy Family Parish
- Mt Druitt South – Sacred Heart Parish
- Penrith – St Nicholas of Myra Parish
- Richmond – St Monica's Parish
- Riverstone – St John the Evangelist Parish
- St Clair – Holy Spirit Parish
- St Mary's – Our Lady of the Rosary Parish
- Windsor – St Matthew's Parish

=== Undefined ===
- Marsden Park – St Luke's Catholic Faith Community (Parochial District)

== See also ==
- Catholic Church in Australia
- Catholic education in the Diocese of Parramatta
