= Transport in Sydney in the 2010s =

The 2010s saw many developments relating to transport in the Australian city of Sydney. The decade saw a substantial investment in infrastructure, including a new airport, motorway projects, light rail lines, Australia's first metro system, the new Waratah fleet and the demise of the non-air conditioned S Sets from the rail network. Planning and branding of public transport services became substantially more centralised.

== Governance ==
In Australia, urban transport is primarily the responsibility of the state and territory governments. Transport was a major issue in the lead up to the 2011 New South Wales state election. The previous (1995–2011) NSW Labor government's management of public transport was perceived as poor and a succession of infrastructure projects that were announced and then abandoned proved politically damaging. The election saw the 16-year-Labor government defeated in a landslide by the Liberal–National Coalition. The Coalition retained power in the 2015 election and the 2019 election.

The following individuals have served as Premier or Transport Minister during the decade:

Party	Premier	Premier's term of office			Transport Minister	Minister's term of office		
Labor	Kristina Keneally	4 December 2009	28 March 2011	1 year, 114 days	David Campbell	8 September 2008	20 May 2010	1 year, 254 days
Labor	Kristina Keneally	4 December 2009	28 March 2011	1 year, 114 days	John Robertson	21 May 2010	28 March 2011	311 days
Liberal	Barry O'Farrell	28 March 2011	17 April 2014	3 years, 20 days	Gladys Berejiklian	4 April 2011	1 April 2015	3 years, 362 days
Liberal	Mike Baird	17 April 2014	23 January 2017	2 years, 281 days	Gladys Berejiklian	4 April 2011	1 April 2015	3 years, 362 days
Liberal	Mike Baird	17 April 2014	23 January 2017	2 years, 281 days	Andrew Constance	2 April 2015	6 October 2021	11 years, 234 days
Liberal	Gladys Berejiklian	23 January 2017	5 October 2021	4 years, 225 days	Andrew Constance	2 April 2015	6 October 2021	11 years, 234 days

=== Transport for NSW ===
The mode icons introduced by Transport for NSW.

Transport for NSW is a statutory authority of the New South Wales Government that manages transport services in the state. It was established on 1 November 2011. The authority was a separate entity from the New South Wales Department of Transport. The authority subsumed the Transport Construction Authority and the Country Rail Infrastructure Authority, and plans and coordinates the functions of RailCorp, the State Transit Authority and Roads & Maritime Services.

Transport for NSW took over the management of most train, bus, ferry and light rail services in New South Wales, which had previously been managed by the operators of the services. The authority now manages the route design, timetabling and branding of these services and also provides passenger information via printed material, a telephone service and a website. Operation of the services is contracted out to a mixture of other government-owned organisations and private enterprise.

The organisation worked to provide more unified branding of public transport services. A new series of logos, dubbed "the hop", was introduced. New mode icons for trains, buses, ferries and light rail were also introduced. Train, ferry and light rail services were given line numbers (T1-T7 for trains, F1-F7 for ferries and L1 for light rail). The icon for metro was also introduced when the metro opened to service in May 2019.

Since absorbing Roads & Maritime Services in December 2019 (see below), it is also responsible for building and maintaining road infrastructure, managing the day-to-day compliance and safety for roads and waterways, and vehicle and license registrations.

==== Roads and Maritime Services ====
As part of the 2011 reforms that established Transport for NSW, Roads & Maritime Services (RMS) was created as a new agency of the New South Wales Government. It was responsible for building and maintaining road infrastructure and managing the day-to-day compliance and safety for roads and waterways. It was formed from a merger of the Roads & Traffic Authority and NSW Maritime. Planning responsibilities were transferred to Transport for NSW.

On 1 December 2019, RMS was dissolved and all its functions were merged into Transport for NSW.

=== Public transport ticketing ===
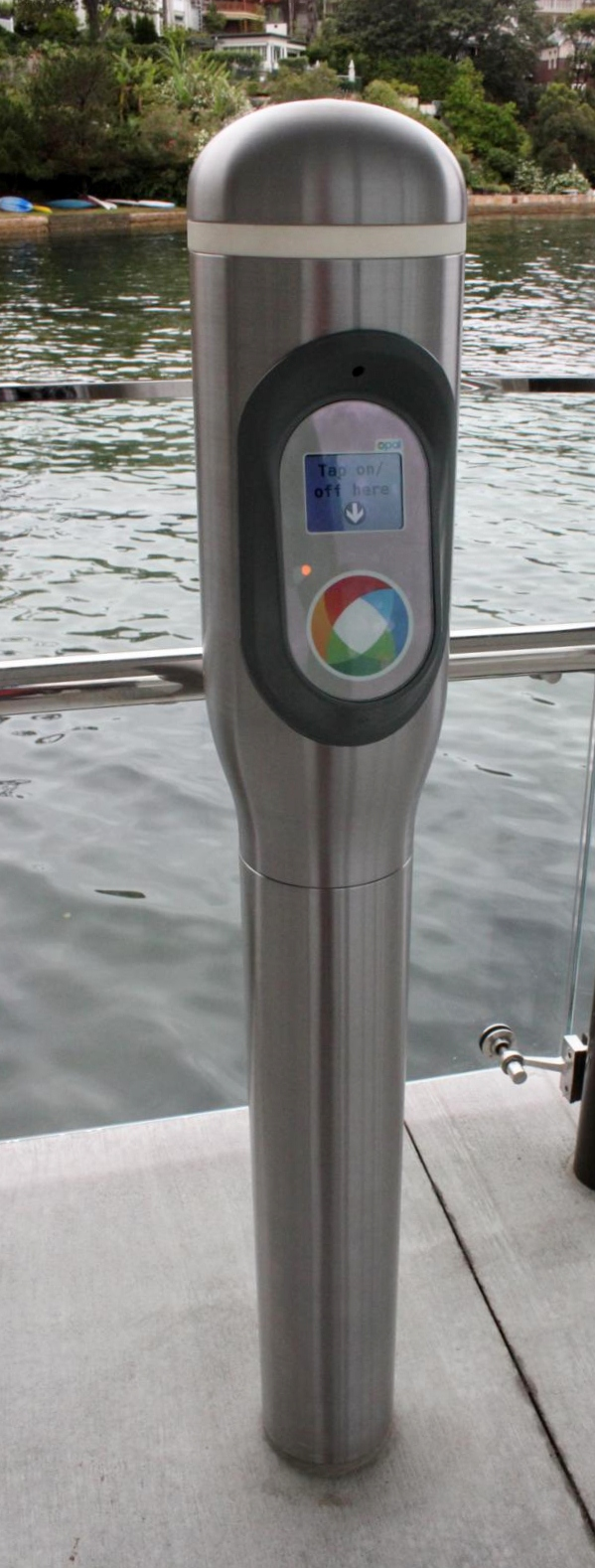
An Opal reader

The ticketing system used on government-operated services in urban New South Wales was expanded and rebranded in April 2010. Called "MyZone", the changes somewhat standardised fare product names and ticket designs across trains, buses and ferries; and brought privately operated buses into the same fare structure as those operated by the State Transit Authority. Limited integration with the then privately owned light rail system was added in 2011. The number of fare bands was reduced, which provided some commuters with substantial price cuts for public transport. Like the previous ticketing range, MyZone used the existing magnetic-stripe Automated Fare Collection system on trains, government buses and ferries. Private bus services and the light rail required manual checking or validation of the ticket by the driver or conductor.

The magnetic-stripe system was introduced in 1992 and had come to be seen as out-of-date. Tcard was a failed attempt to introduce an inter-modal stored-value smart card. Though originally intended to be in place before the 2000 Sydney Olympics, the project suffered major delays. In 2007, the state government terminated the contract to deliver the project. On 12 April 2010, the state government announced that a new contract had been awarded for the second attempt to introduce a smartcard system. The new system, called Opal, was introduced between December 2012 and December 2014. Once the rollout was complete, Opal quickly started replacing all other tickets. The pre-existing tickets were retired in stages; the last remaining tickets were withdrawn on 1 August 2016. At this time, single trip Opal tickets were introduced for infrequent travellers.

== Road ==
=== NorthConnex ===
NorthConnex is a 9-kilometre (5.6 mi) motorway tunnel in the northern suburbs. Opened 31 October 2020, it connects the M1 Pacific Motorway to the M2 Hills Motorway. NorthConnex links to the Sydney Orbital Network and forms part of the National Highway route. Major construction began in mid-2015 and completed in late 2020.

The tunnel will provide an alternative to Pennant Hills Road. In 2013 National Roads and Motorists' Association members identified Pennant Hills Road as the third worst road in New South Wales and the Australian Capital Territory.

=== WestConnex ===
WestConnex is a motorway scheme currently under construction. The scheme, a joint project of the New South Wales and Australian governments, encompasses widening and extension of the M4 Western Motorway, a new section for the M5 South Western Motorway named the M8, and a new inner western bypass of the Sydney CBD connecting the M4 and M5.

The initial M4 widening and King Georges Road Interchange Upgrades began construction in 2015 and were completed in 2017. The M4 East was completed in July 2019, and the New M5 Tunnel is due for completion in 2020 respectively. The final stages, M4–M5 link, Iron Cove Link and Sydney Gateway, are expected to begin construction in 2019 and be completed by 2023.

=== Other road proposals ===
The Western Harbour Tunnel and Beaches Link was a planned north-south motorway between Frenchs Forest in the Northern Beaches and the WestConnex motorway at Rozelle in the Inner West. The four-lane motorway is planned to be 14 km long. The Sydney Harbour Bridge and Sydney Harbour Tunnel corridor currently carry 80 percent of all vehicles crossing Sydney Harbour and the Parramatta River. The new tunnel would reduce pressure on the existing infrastructure by providing another harbour crossing. The New South Wales Government pledged $77 million in funding to evaluate the design and construction feasibility of the project.

In 2014, federal government and the New South Wales state government jointly funded the Western Sydney Infrastructure Plan (WSIP), a road investment program consisting of key road upgrade projects in Western Sydney. Included in the plan is the Western Sydney Airport Motorway, a planned east-west motorway along the current alignment of Elizabeth Drive between the Westlink M7 Motorway and The Northern Road. The four-lane motorway is planned to be 14 km long and to be built at a cost of $1.25 billion. It is aimed at providing direct access from the Westlink M7 to the new Western Sydney Airport at Badgerys Creek. The NSW Government announced $6 million for planning the Western Sydney Airport Motorway as part of the 2014–2015 State Budget. Other WSIP projects include the upgrade, road widening, and partial realignment of The Northern Road between South Penrith and Narellan.

A northern extension the Princes Motorway (F6) is being considered. The motorway links Sydney and Wollongong and currently ends in Sydney's southern suburbs. As part of modifications made during the planning stage of the WestConnex project, stub tunnels will be added to the M8 tunnel to allow for an extension connection to it by the F6 extension. In June 2016 Roads & Maritime Services commenced geotechnical analysis to determine underground rock and soil conditions on the former F6 corridor from Waterfall to the Sydney Orbital Network at Rockdale with a view into developing a possible link between the Princes Motorway and the Orbital Network. In 2017, it was revealed that the state government had reviewed a 3.6 billion dollar train tunnel between Thirroul and Waterfall on the South Coast Line that could reduce travel time between Sydney and Wollongong by 22 minutes, but the government favoured improving and extending the motorway instead. Later in 2017, a state government leak showed the extent of the route. Works would include tunnels to the northern side of the Captain Cook Bridge and a bridge duplication allowing for motorway traffic to use the existing bridge and local traffic to keep access. To the south of the bridge, a surface motorway would run through current parks and reserves which had been left for the original route, then run along the route of the current Princes Highway with tunnels bypassing the suburbs of Heathcote and Waterfall before joining the existing freeway.

== Heavy rail and metro ==
=== From CityRail to Sydney Trains ===
At the start of the decade, Sydney's suburban passenger rail network was owned by RailCorp and operated under its CityRail brand. CityRail had two tiers of service: suburban services catered for travel within Sydney, while intercity services extended out to the surrounding regions. The new Coalition government decided to reform this structure. RailCorp was stripped of its role as network manager and passenger service operator but remained the network owner. Two new operators were created: Sydney Trains maintained the network and operated suburban passenger services, while NSW Trains operated intercity services under the NSW TrainLink brand. The new operators took control on 1 July 2013.

=== Rail Clearways Program and 2013 timetable ===
The Rail Clearways Program was a package of infrastructure improvements to the Sydney suburban network that took place in the second half of the 2000s and the first half of the 2010s. The following projects were completed in the 2010s:

Project	Description	Opened
Homebush Turnback	Breaks the Bankstown loop by giving Inner West line trains a place to terminate where six tracks reduce to four	March 2011
Kingsgrove–Revesby Quadruplication	Allows express trains to overtake and remain separate from all stops services, in conjunction with existing four track section between Wolli Creek and Kingsgrove	April 2013
Lidcombe Turnback	Breaks the Bankstown loop by giving Bankstown line trains a place to terminate	November 2010
Liverpool Second Turnback	New platform for through trains, allowing conversion of existing through platform and side turnback into two centre turnbacks	January 2014
Quakers Hill–Vineyard Duplication	Improves capacity to support new suburbs in North-Western Sydney	Schofields – Vineyard deferred Oct 2008; Quakers Hill – Schofields: October 2011
Sutherland–Cronulla Duplication	Duplication of single track sections between Sutherland and Gymea and between Caringbah and Cronulla to improve capacity	April 2010

With all but one of the Rail Clearways projects completed, a new timetable was released in October 2013. The new timetable saw the introduction of line numbers to the Sydney Trains network and the rationalisation of lines. The Bankstown loop – the interwoven operation of the Bankstown and Inner West lines – was broken by terminating trains at Lidcombe and Homebush. Almost all Liverpool via Regents Park services were discontinued. The Cumberland line was extended to Schofields and its operating hours were increased. The Northern line was merged with the North Shore and Western lines. The Airport & East Hills and South lines merged and were joined with what was left of the Inner West line.

The former lines were:

Line colour and name	Between
Airport & East Hills Line	City Circle and Macarthur via Revesby and either Sydenham (peak) or Airport
Bankstown Line	City Circle and Liverpool or Lidcombe via Bankstown and Sydenham
Carlingford Line	Clyde and Carlingford
Cumberland Line	Blacktown and Campbelltown
Eastern Suburbs & Illawarra Line	Bondi Junction and Waterfall or Cronulla via Central
Inner West Line	City Circle and Bankstown or Liverpool (peak), via Regents Park
Northern Line	Epping and Hornsby via Strathfield, Central and Macquarie Park
North Shore Line; Western Line	Central and Berowra via Gordon; Central and Emu Plains or Richmond via Parramatta
South Line	City Circle and Campbelltown, via Granville
Olympic Park Line	Lidcombe and Olympic Park. Some services operate between Central and Olympic Park, particularly during special events

These were replaced with:

Line colour, number and name		Between
T1	North Shore, Northern & Western Line	Central and Berowra via Gordon. Central and Hornsby via Macquarie Park. Central and Emu Plains, Richmond or Epping via Strathfield.
T2	Airport, Inner West & South Line	City Circle and Macarthur via Revesby and either Sydenham (peak) or Airport; City Circle and Campbelltown via Strathfield and Granville
T3	Bankstown Line	City Circle and Liverpool or Lidcombe via Bankstown and Sydenham
T4	Eastern Suburbs & Illawarra Line	Bondi Junction and Waterfall or Cronulla via Central
T5	Cumberland Line	Schofields and Campbelltown
T6	Carlingford Line	Clyde and Carlingford
T7	Olympic Park Line	Lidcombe and Olympic Park. Some services operate between Central and Olympic Park, particularly during special events

=== South West Rail Link and 2017 timetable ===
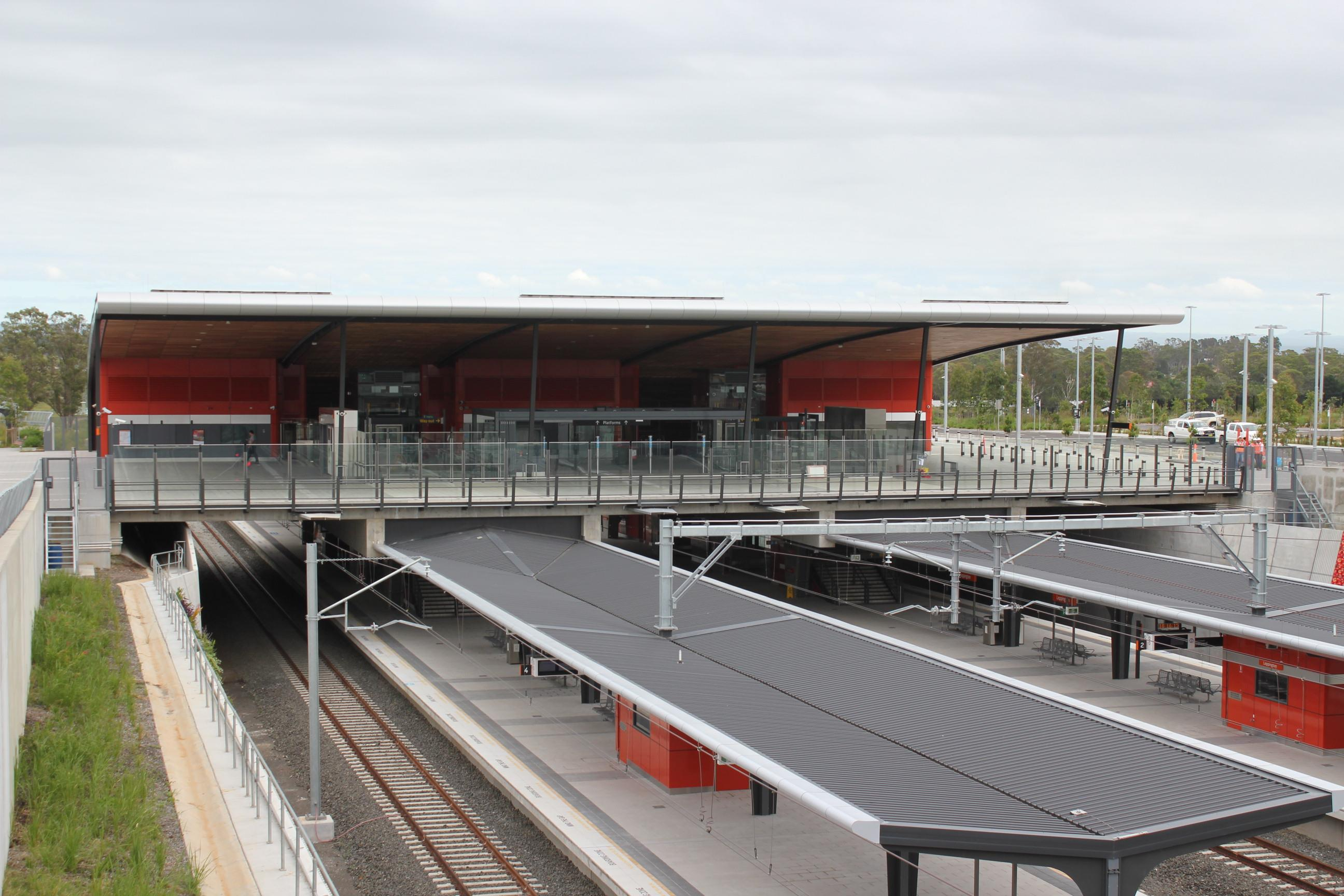
The terminus of the South West Rail Link at Leppington

The South West Rail Link is a new passenger railway that serves the city's "South West Growth Centre". It diverges from the existing network at Glenfield and runs to Leppington. An intermediate station serves Edmondson Park. The line opened 8 February 2015. The railway was integrated with the T2 Inner West & South Line in December 2015, replacing the initial shuttle service between Leppington and Liverpool.

A new Sydney Trains timetable was introduced in November 2017. The T2 line was split in two. The new T2 consists of services from Leppington to the city via Granville, with a branch to Parramatta being added. A new T8 line covers services from Macarthur to the city via Sydney Airport or Sydenham. The T2 is coloured light blue – a similar colour to CityRail's South Line. The T8 is coloured green. T5 services were modified to no longer travel to and from Campbelltown, instead starting and terminating at Leppington. Late night and weekend services were introduced on the line. The late night services extend to Richmond, replacing T1 services at these times. These changes mean the section of the network between Glenfield and Macarthur is served exclusively by services operating via the East Hills railway line.

Line colour, number and name		Between
T1	North Shore, Northern & Western Line	Central and Berowra via Gordon. Central and Hornsby via Macquarie Park. Central and Emu Plains, Richmond or Epping via Strathfield.
T2	Inner West & Leppington Line	City Circle and Parramatta or Leppington via Granville
T3	Bankstown Line	City Circle and Liverpool or Lidcombe via Bankstown and Sydenham
T4	Eastern Suburbs & Illawarra Line	Bondi Junction and Waterfall or Cronulla via Central
T5	Cumberland Line	Schofields and Leppington. Some services extend from Schofields to Richmond
T6	Carlingford Line	Clyde and Carlingford
T7	Olympic Park Line	Lidcombe and Olympic Park. Some services operate between Central and Olympic Park, particularly during special events
T8	Airport & South Line	City Circle and Macarthur via Revesby and either Sydenham (peak) or Airport

=== 2018–2019 timetable changes due to Sydney Metro ===
The Epping to Chatswood railway line closed in September 2018 to enable its conversion to metro standards. This resulted in the reintroduction of the traditional Northern Line route from Hornsby to the city via Strathfield, by extending the Epping branch of the line back to Hornsby. This route was eventually made a separate T9 route in April 2019. The Metro North West Line began service one month later on 26 May 2019 when the Sydney Metro Northwest opened.

Line colour, number and name		Between
T1	North Shore & Western Line	Berowra and Emu Plains or Richmond via Chatswood, Central and Strathfield
T2	Inner West & Leppington Line	City Circle and Parramatta or Leppington via Granville
T3	Bankstown Line	City Circle and Liverpool or Lidcombe via Bankstown and Sydenham
T4	Eastern Suburbs & Illawarra Line	Bondi Junction and Waterfall or Cronulla via Central
T5	Cumberland Line	Schofields and Leppington. Some services extend from Schofields to Richmond
T6	Carlingford Line	Clyde and Carlingford
T7	Olympic Park Line	Lidcombe and Olympic Park. Some services operate between Central and Olympic Park, particularly during special events
T8	Airport & South Line	City Circle and Macarthur via Revesby and either Sydenham (peak) or Airport
T9	Northern Line	Hornsby and Gordon via Strathfield, Central and Chatswood
M1 Metro North West & Bankstown Line	Metro North West Line	Tallawong and Chatswood

=== Freight infrastructure ===
The Southern Sydney Freight Line is a freight-only relief line in the south-western suburbs. It runs parallel to the Main South line and was constructed to avoid a curfew for freight trains that restricts them from operating in the suburban area during peak hours. The line forms part of a dedicated freight only corridor between Macarthur and Port Botany. The line is managed by the Australian Rail Track Corporation, while the adjacent passenger lines are managed by Sydney Trains. The line commenced operations in late 2012.

The stage 1 Northern Sydney Freight Corridor projects provided increased capacity along the shared passenger and freight route between Sydney and Maitland. It included two projects within Sydney. A new underpass at North Strathfield removes the need for freight trains to switch tracks, which blocked passenger trains in the process. A third track between Epping and Thornleigh provides an additional overtaking opportunity for northbound trains on this steeply graded section. The projects were completed by mid-2016.

In its 2017 budget, the Australian Government announced funding for the Inland Rail project. This new route will provide a bypass of Sydney for trains connecting with Brisbane from Perth, Adelaide and Melbourne and will result in reduced growth in the number of freight trains passing through Sydney.

=== Metro projects ===
The Metro North West & Bankstown Line connects Rouse Hill to Chatswood via Epping on the Sydney Metro Northwest project (teal) when it opened in 2019. The City & Southwest project (cyan) connects the Sydney central business district to Bankstown via a tunnel under Sydney Harbour when it opened in 2024.

The decade had seen work begin on the long-planned North West Rail Link. The line was initially planned as a main line railway integrated with the rest of the Sydney suburban network, but in March 2008 the Government changed the project to a metro line dubbed the North West Metro and expanded the line to run all the way to the Sydney CBD via Drummoyne and Pyrmont. In October 2008, the NSW Government announced that the North West Metro would be indefinitely deferred due to budgetary cuts. In February 2010, two and a half months after Kristina Keneally had become Premier, the NSW Government revealed the cancellation of the entire Sydney Metro project in its Metropolitan Transport Plan and returned to the North West Rail Link main line rail proposal.

Following his victory in the 2011 state election, newly elected Premier Barry O'Farrell announced that his first order of business would be to start construction on the North West Rail Link. The new government had originally intended to maintain the plan to build the line as a main line railway, but in 2012 it decided to switch the project back to a metro line. The Epping to Chatswood railway line will also be converted to metro standards. The line, now known as Sydney Metro Northwest, opened 26 May 2019 and was Australia's first metro line.

The decision to build the line as a metro meant passengers travelling to and from the Sydney central business district are required to change trains at Chatswood. This would be inconvenient and would place pressure on the North Shore line. The government's solution was to announce a major extension of the metro project. Sydney Metro City & Southwest is a 30-kilometre extension from Chatswood to Bankstown. The link will include a new tunnel that begins at Chatswood, travels down the lower North Shore, under Sydney Harbour, through the Sydney central business district and emerges at Sydenham. The extension will then take over most of the main line Bankstown railway line. The project is due to be completed in 2024.

A second metro line was announced in November 2016. Sydney Metro West will travel from the central business district to Parramatta. Planning for the line is at an extremely early stage. The line is expected to open in the second half of the 2020s.

A rail link to the Western Sydney Airport was announced by the New South Wales and Australian governments in March 2018. This line would run south from St Marys to the airport, before continuing on to the "Badgerys Creek Aerotropolis", an area south of the airport. Funding for the line will be split 50:50 between the governments. The line is likely to be a metro or light metro.

=== Rolling stock fleet ===
The decade has seen the delivery of the OSCAR and Waratah classes and planned introduction of a new Waratah-based suburban class and trains for the metro.

The OSCARS or H sets are a class of 55 four-car trains that primarily operate on intercity services but are sometimes also used on suburban services. They entered service between 2006 and 2012.

The Waratahs or A sets are a class of 78 eight-car trains that operate on the suburban network. The trains entered service between 2011 and 2014. These were the first trains in Sydney to be configured as eight-car rather than four-car sets.

Originally, the Waratahs were intended to replace all 498 S set carriages, but in February 2013 it was revealed that some S sets would still be required to provide services on the South West Rail Link. An option existed to extend the order, but in March 2013 the government indicated it would not take this up. Instead, in May 2014, the government announced its intention to purchase new trains for the NSW TrainLink intercity network. These new trains are expected to enter service in late 2019 and will release at least some OSCARS from intercity to Sydney Trains services.

Despite proceeding with the intercity train order, the New South Wales Government announced on 1 December 2016 that 24 new suburban trains had been ordered. Known as series 2 Waratahs or B sets, the trains share more than 90 percent of their design with the original Waratahs. The first trains entered service in late 2018 and the last by the end of June 2019 allowing the last S set to be withdrawn on 28 June 2019. A further 17 sets have been ordered with a possible 28 additional sets to the ordered at a future date.

A technology upgrade of the Tangara trains was announced in August 2015. The program will extend the life of these trains (which were introduced in the late 1980s and early 1990s) and bring technology into line with newer trains. The contract was awarded to UGL Limited. The program is expected to be completed in 2019.

22 six-car Alstom Metropolis trains were put into service in 2019. These operate on the Sydney Metro network and are single deck, in contrast to the double deck suburban trains.

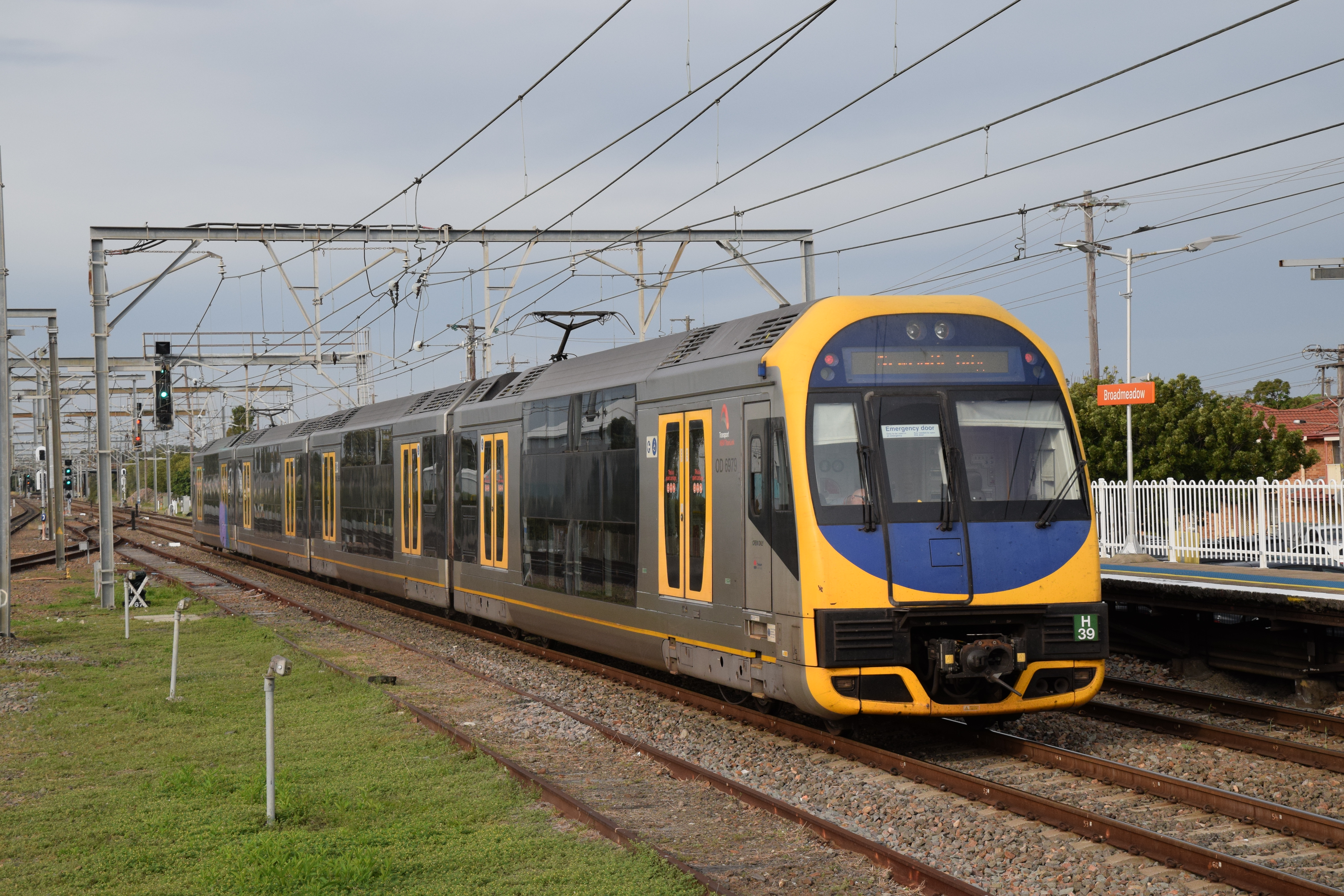
Introduced: H sets

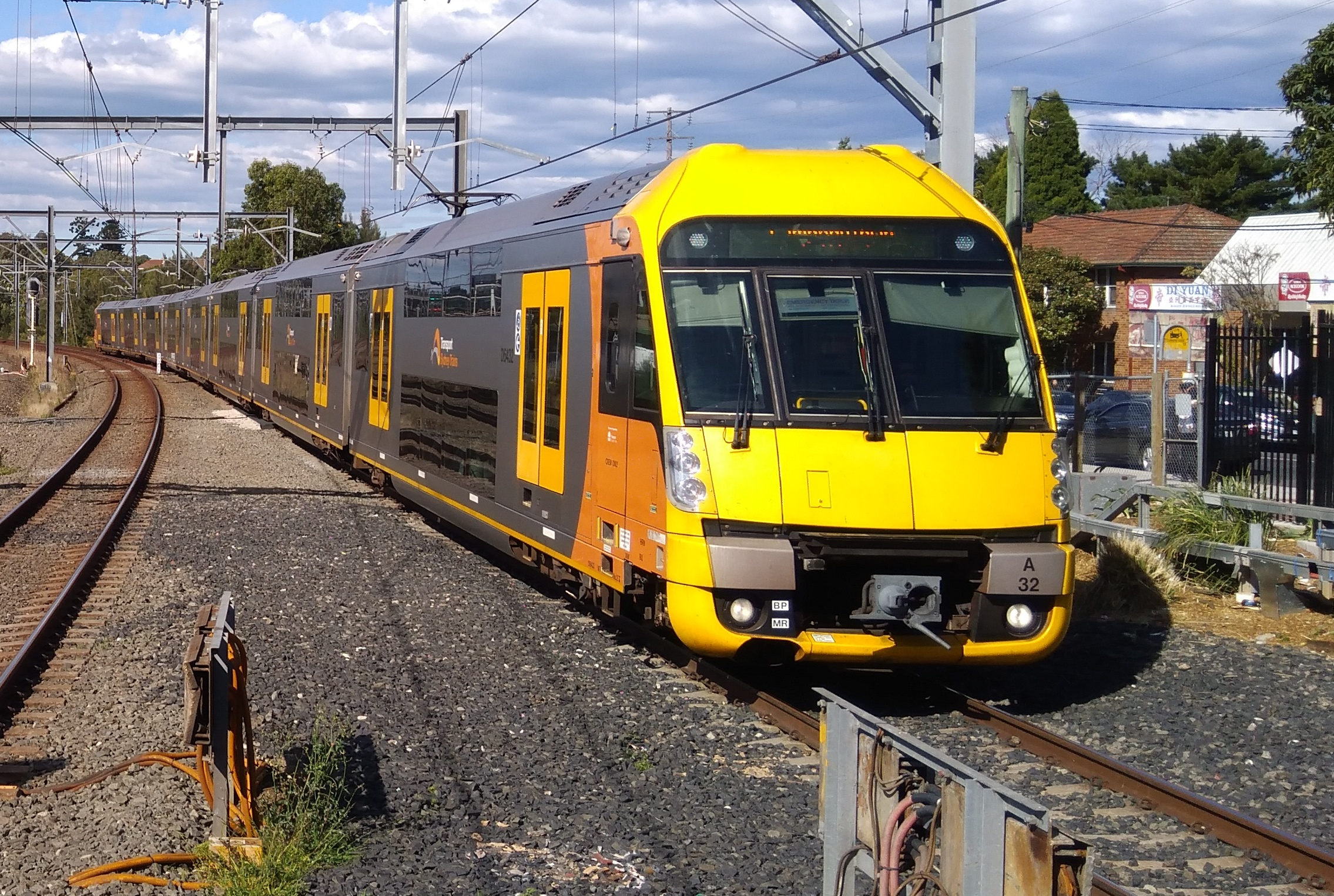
Introduced: A sets

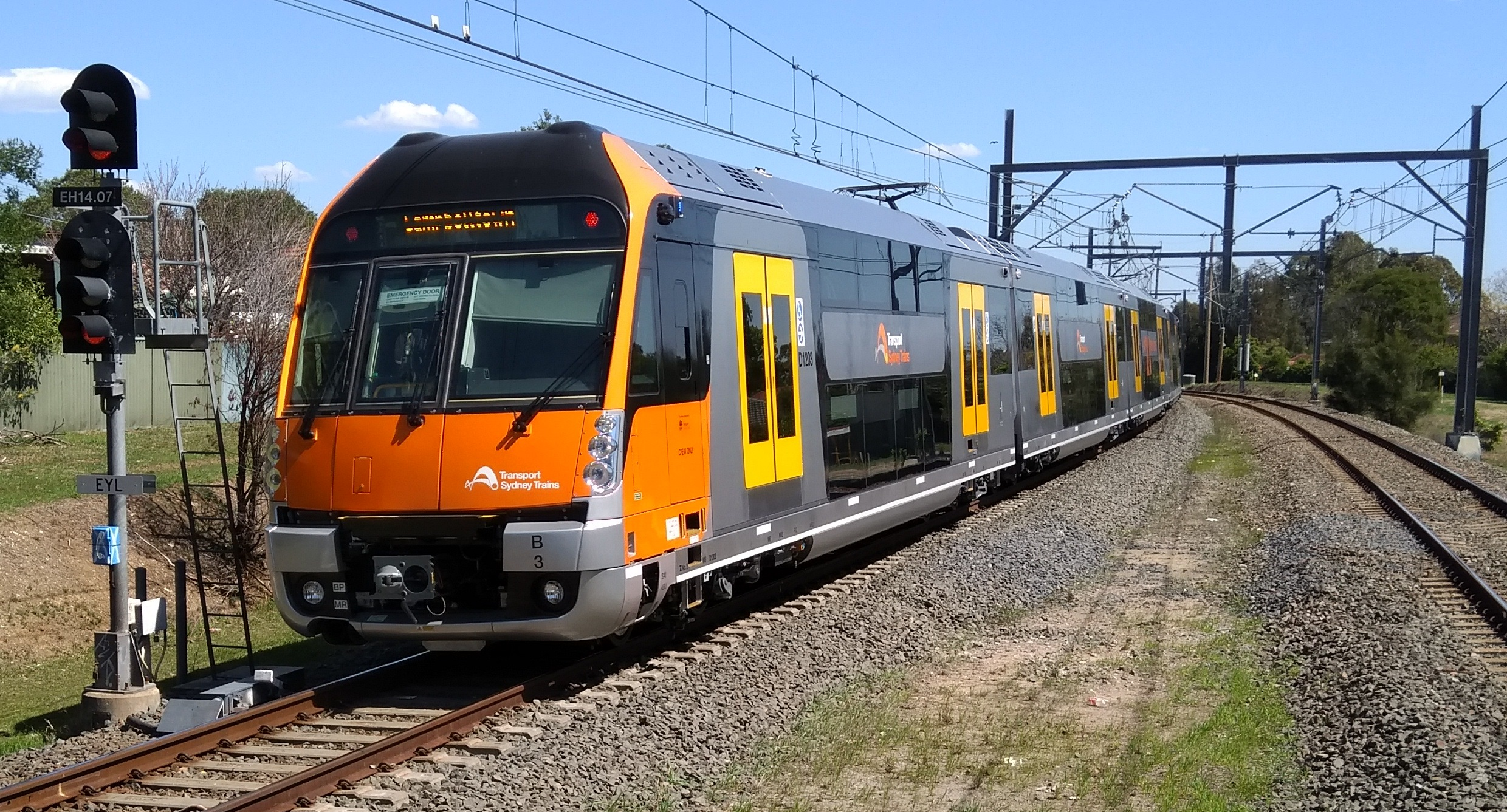
Introduced: B sets

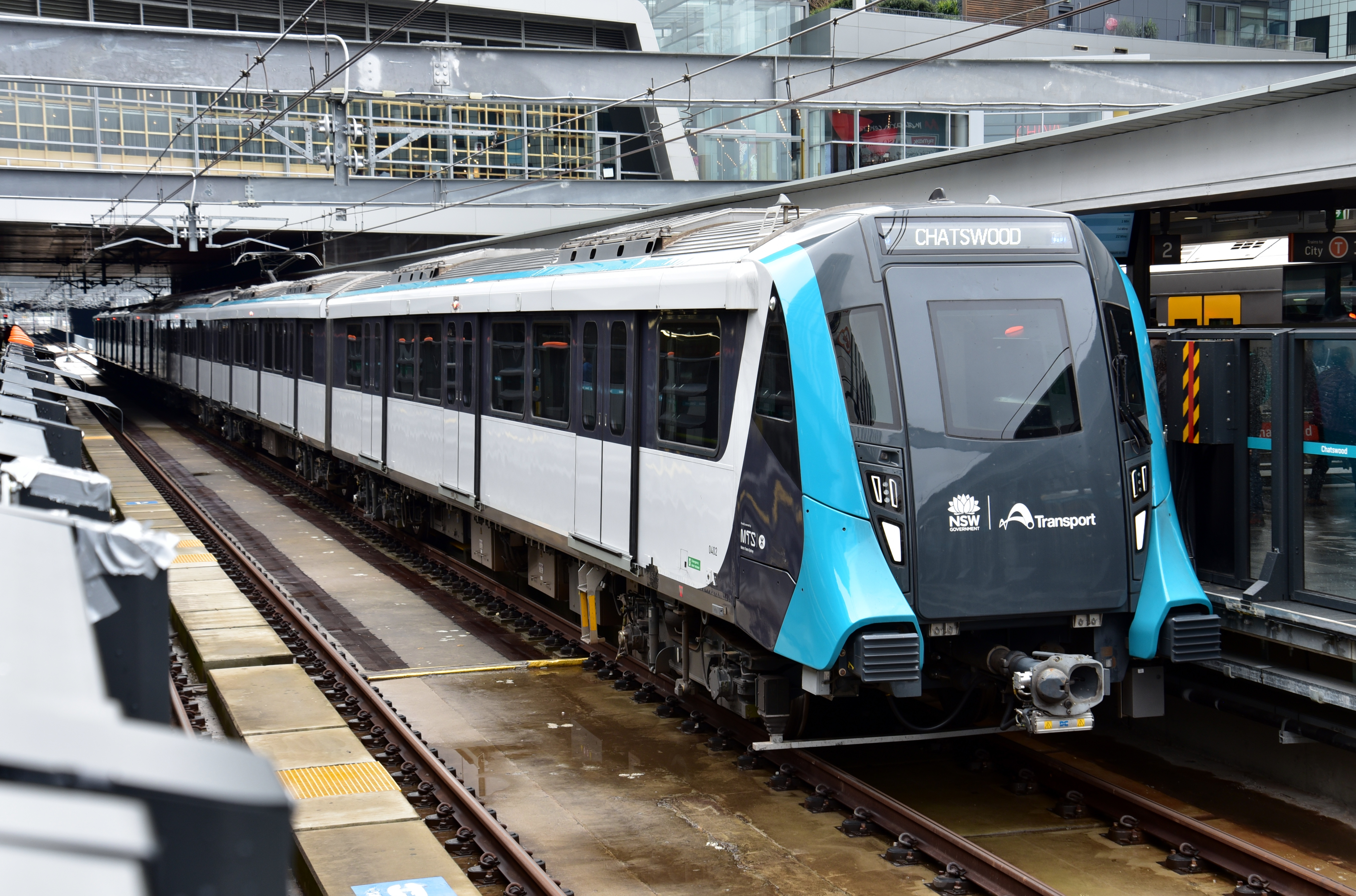
Introduced: Metropolis Stock

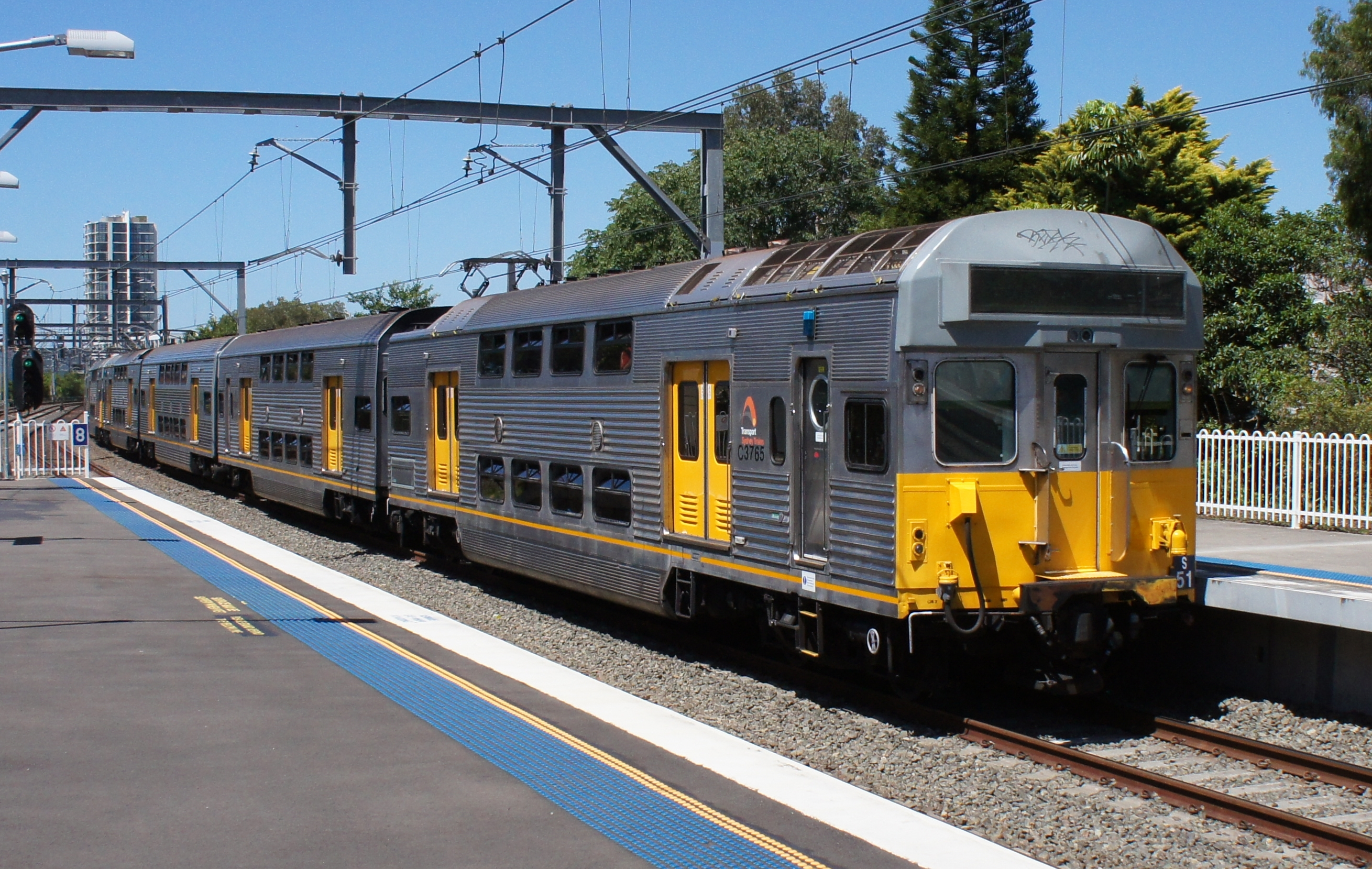
Withdrawn: S sets

== Light rail and monorail ==
=== Purchase by the government and closure of monorail ===
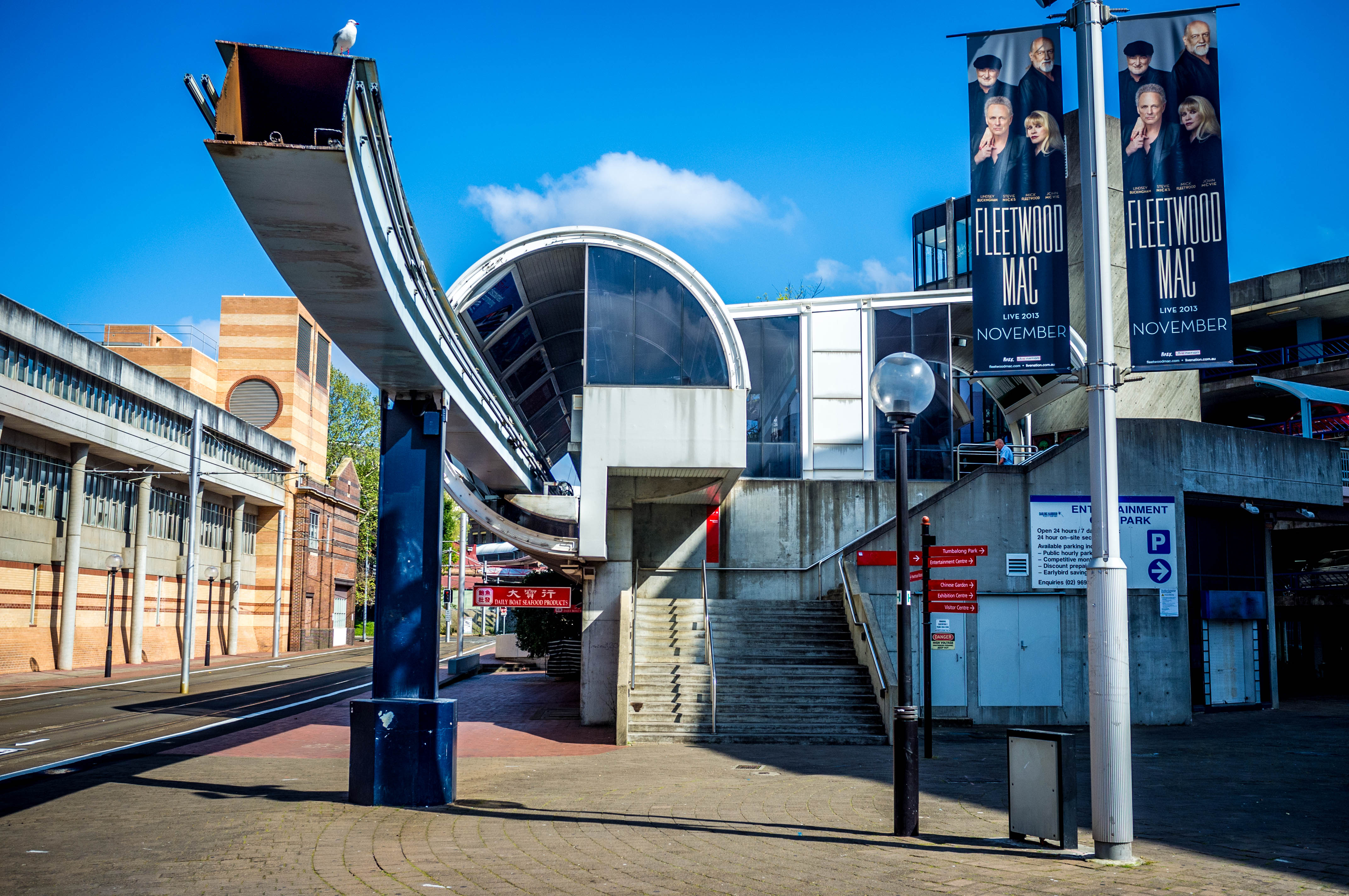
The Paddy's Markets monorail station in September 2013, while the system was being demolished

Sydney's original light rail line, the Inner West Light Rail, was delivered as a public-private partnership. The private owner, Sydney Light Rail Company, was awarded a 30.5-year concession, allowing it to operate the line until February 2028, when ownership would pass to the New South Wales Government. The contract gave the company significant control over the commercial arrangements relating to future extensions or interconnecting lines. The government purchased the company in March 2012, removing the contractual restrictions on expanding the light rail network.

Another motivation for the purchase was the government's desire to redevelop the Sydney Convention and Exhibition Centre at Darling Harbour. The Sydney Monorail, a loop line between the Central Business District and Darling Harbour, shared an ownership and operational structure with the light rail. The government saw the monorail as an impediment to the redevelopment of the Darling Harbour area. Opening in 1988, the monorail was built as a response to an earlier redevelopment of Darling Harbour from a port to a leisure precinct. The monorail ceased operating on 30 June 2013 and was then demolished.

=== Light rail extensions ===
The Inner West Light Rail was extended from Lilyfield to Dulwich Hill in March 2014. Like much of the preexisting line, the extension uses the alignment of a disused freight railway.

The CBD and South East Light Rail operates from Circular Quay at the northern end of the Central Business District to Central station at the southern end, then continuing to the south-eastern suburbs. Major construction began in October 2015. The line was initially projected to open in early 2019. However, the project was extensively delayed, with the line between Circular Quay and Randwick opened on 14 December 2019 and the rest of the stops on the Kingsford branch to open March 2020.

Parramatta Light Rail is the name given to two planned lines that converge on the Western Sydney centre of Parramatta. The first line runs from Carlingford to Westmead via the Parramatta CBD. It includes the conversion of most of the underused existing heavy rail Carlingford line to light rail standards. Construction began in 2018 and opened in 2023. The second part of the line will extend from Camellia to Olympic Park via Wentworth Point, the project is composed of stages 2a and 2b.

=== Tram fleet ===
Services on the Inner West Light Rail are provided by a fleet of twelve CAF Urbos 3 trams. The trams were ordered to service the Dulwich Hill extension, increase service frequencies and replace the Variotrams that had been providing services on the Inner West Light Rail since the first section of the line opened in 1997. The trams entered service between July 2014 and June 2015. As a stopgap measure until the new trams arrived, four leased CAF Urbos 2 trams ran on the Inner West Light Rail in 2014.

Sixty Alstom Citadis X05 trams were purchased to provide services on the CBD and South East Light Rail. The trams consist of five-sections and operate coupled together in pairs. The first unit was completed in May 2017.

An additional thirteen CAF Urbos 3 vehicles will operate on the Parramatta Light Rail.

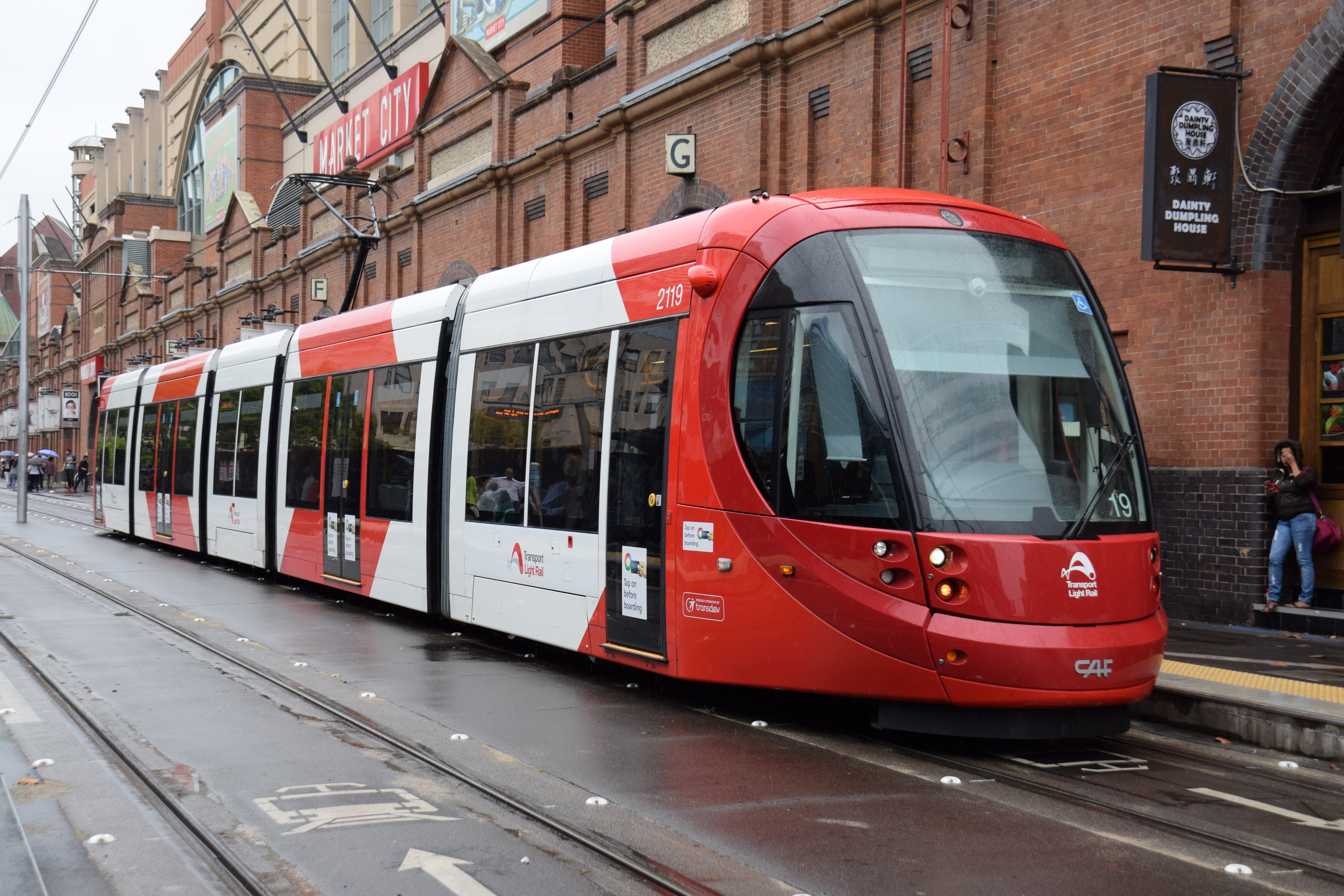
Introduced: Urbos 3

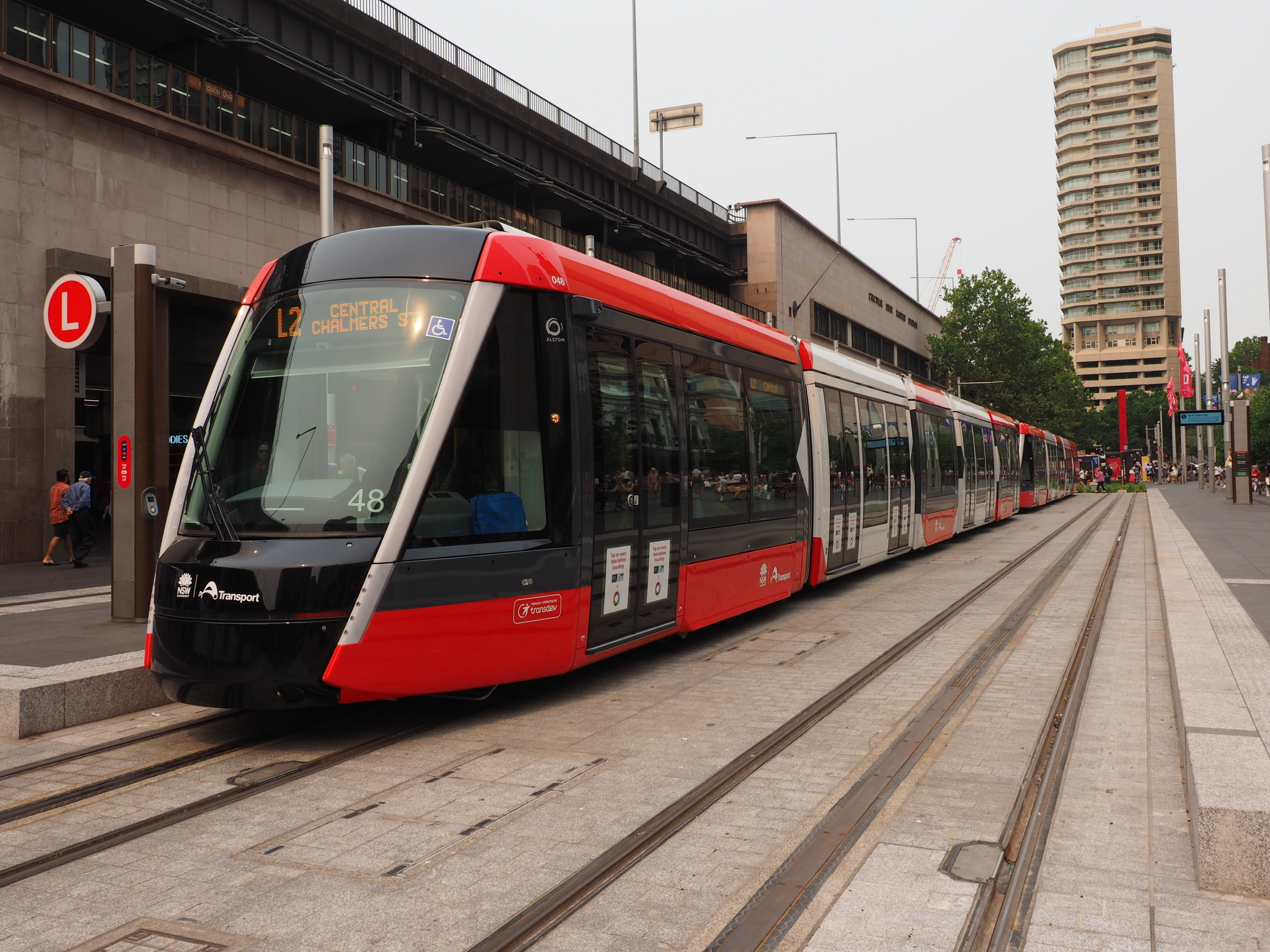
Introduced: Alstom Citadis X05

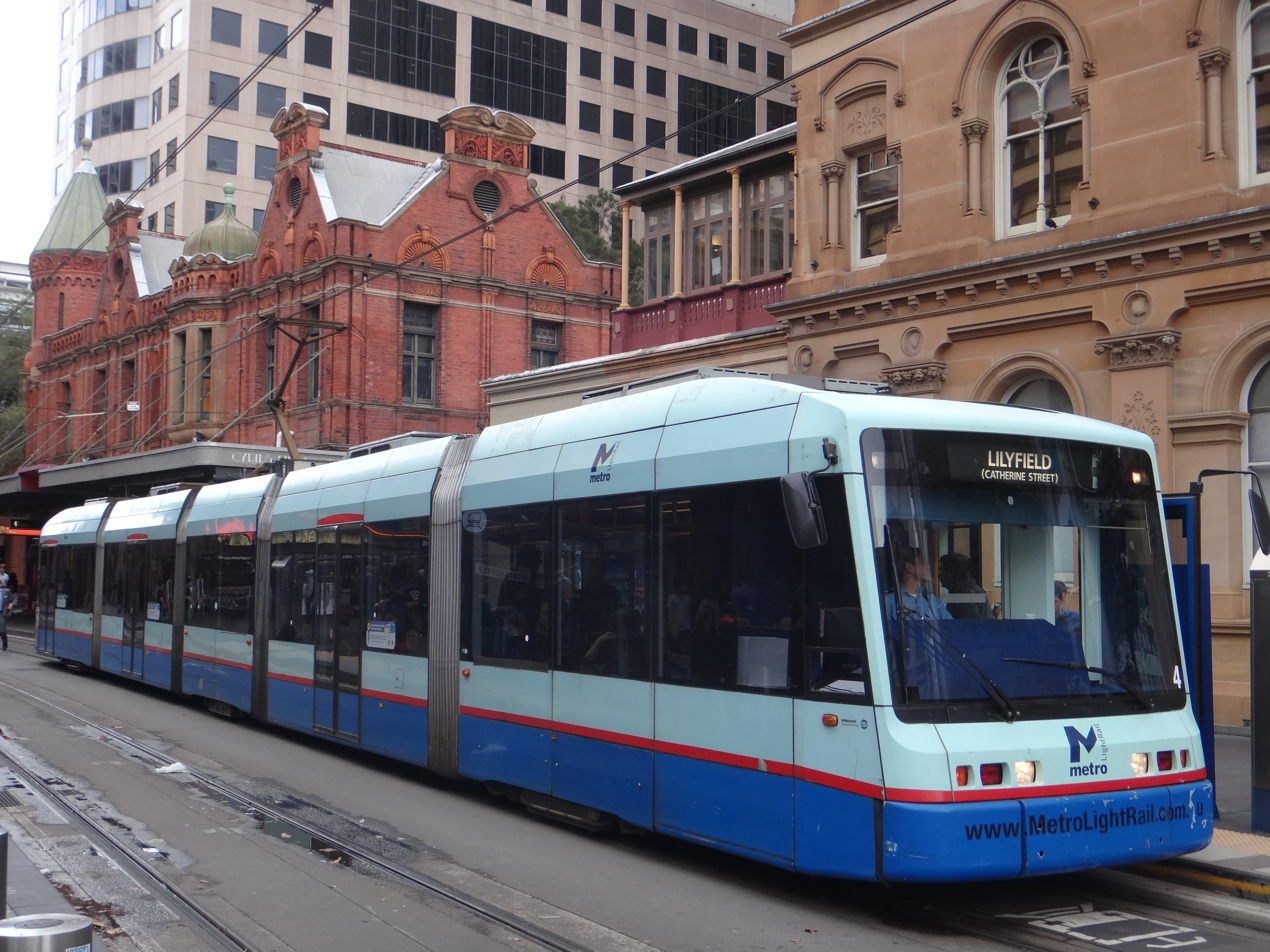
Withdrawn: Variotram

== Bus ==
=== Bus contract reform ===
The 2004 Review of Bus Services in NSW (the Unsworth report) found that the Sydney metropolitan area had two bus systems – government and privately operated, with widely varying levels of service and customer satisfaction that fell short of community expectations. The government accepted the review's recommendation that the existing 87 serviced areas be consolidated into 15 regions and service contracts be established with the operators. The contracts provided consistent fares, concessions and service standards for customers on both government and privately operated services. These contracts were negotiated with existing operators and commenced in 2005.

In 2011 and 2012 the privately operated contract regions were put out to competitive tender for the first time. Some of the incumbent operators lost the right to continue operating services in their regions.

==== State Transit ====
The role of the government-owned bus operator State Transit was reduced. Operation of the Liverpool–Parramatta T-way was included in the broader region 3 contract from 2013, with Transit Systems taking over operation from State Transit's Western Sydney Buses subsidiary.

In 2017, the government announced that region 6 services – covering Sydney's Inner West region – would be transferred to a private operator. Transit Systems was also awarded this contract, which commenced on 1 July 2018 and runs for eight years.

State Transit were also replaced as the operator of Newcastle's bus and ferry services – the authority's only operations outside of Sydney. However, operation of the new B-Line service was handed to State Transit as part of its region 8 contract.

=== B-Line ===
A new express bus service called B-Line was introduced on the Northern Beaches in November 2017. The service runs for 27 kilometres, between Mona Vale on the Northern Beaches and the Sydney central business district. It is operated by dedicated fleet of double deck buses. As part of its introduction there was a restructure of other routes operating in the region.

=== Bus fleet ===
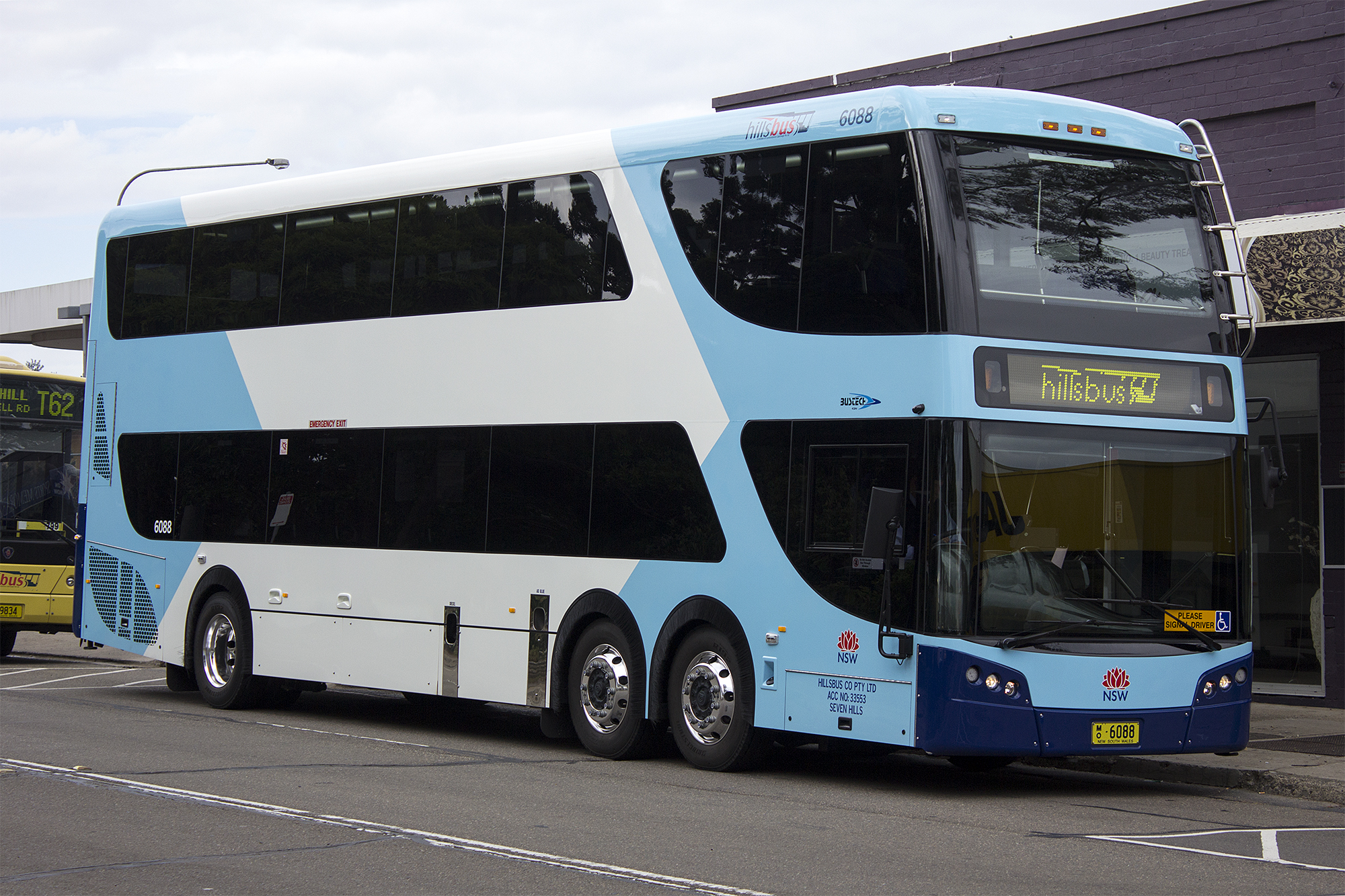
A double-decker bus in the Transport NSW operator-neutral livery.

As the government has moved to a contestable contract model since the Unsworth report, so it has acquired a greater interest in the buses acquired to operate its routes. The government buys many of the new buses entering service in private operator fleets, and has step-in rights where a private operator loses a contract. State Transit and the private operators must buy new vehicles from approved panel suppliers. After several decades absence, double-decker buses were re-introduced to Sydney on select routes. Until 2010, each bus operator determined the livery for their vehicles. In late 2010, the NSW Government introduced a new livery for use on all new vehicles entering service on the network. The design is composed of a light blue background, a white chevron shape pointing in the direction of travel, and dark blue bumpers. In 2017 the government announced that articulated buses would be progressively phased out in favour of double-deckers.

== Ferry ==
=== Franchising ===
Operation of the Sydney Ferries network was contracted out to a private operator.

On 3 April 2007, Bret Walker, a Senior Counsel, was appointed to undertake a commission of inquiry into Sydney Ferries' operations. Submissions to Walker's inquiry were critical of many aspects of the operation of Sydney Ferries. Walker's report, delivered in November 2007, was highly critical of the ferry management, industrial relations and government interference. Walker made several major recommendations including the urgent replacement of the entire ageing fleet of vessels and handing day-to-day operations over to a private sector operator while the NSW government retained the fleet and other assets in public ownership.

In 2008, the NSW Government called for private sector bids to provide ferry services under a services contract. But in April 2010 the NSW Government decided the service contract would remain with Sydney Ferries Corporation.

In 2011, following the election of the O'Farrell Government, it was decided to contract out the operation of Sydney Ferries to the private sector, with the government retaining ownership of both the Balmain Maintenance Facility and the ferry fleet.

On 28 July 2012, Harbour City Ferries, originally a 50/50 joint venture between Broadspectrum and Transdev Australasia, began operating the services of Sydney Ferries under a seven-year contract. In December 2016, Transdev took full control of the joint venture, and to coincide with a new contract commencing 1 July 2019 and finishing in 2028, the operation was renamed Transdev Sydney Ferries

=== Route changes ===
As part of the 2013 public transport branding changes, route numbers were introduced to the Sydney Ferries network. The routes were: F1 Manly, F2 Taronga Zoo, F3 Parramatta, F4 Darling Harbour, F5 Neutral Bay, F6 Mosman Bay and F7 Eastern Suburbs. The 2017 timetable saw some of these routes reorganised. The F7 route was truncated to terminate at Double Bay instead of Watsons Bay and the F4 was extended from its prior terminus at Circular Quay to take over the remainder of the route. The F3 was split up, resulting in a new F8 route taking over services to most wharves east of Cockatoo Island.

=== New and upgraded wharves ===
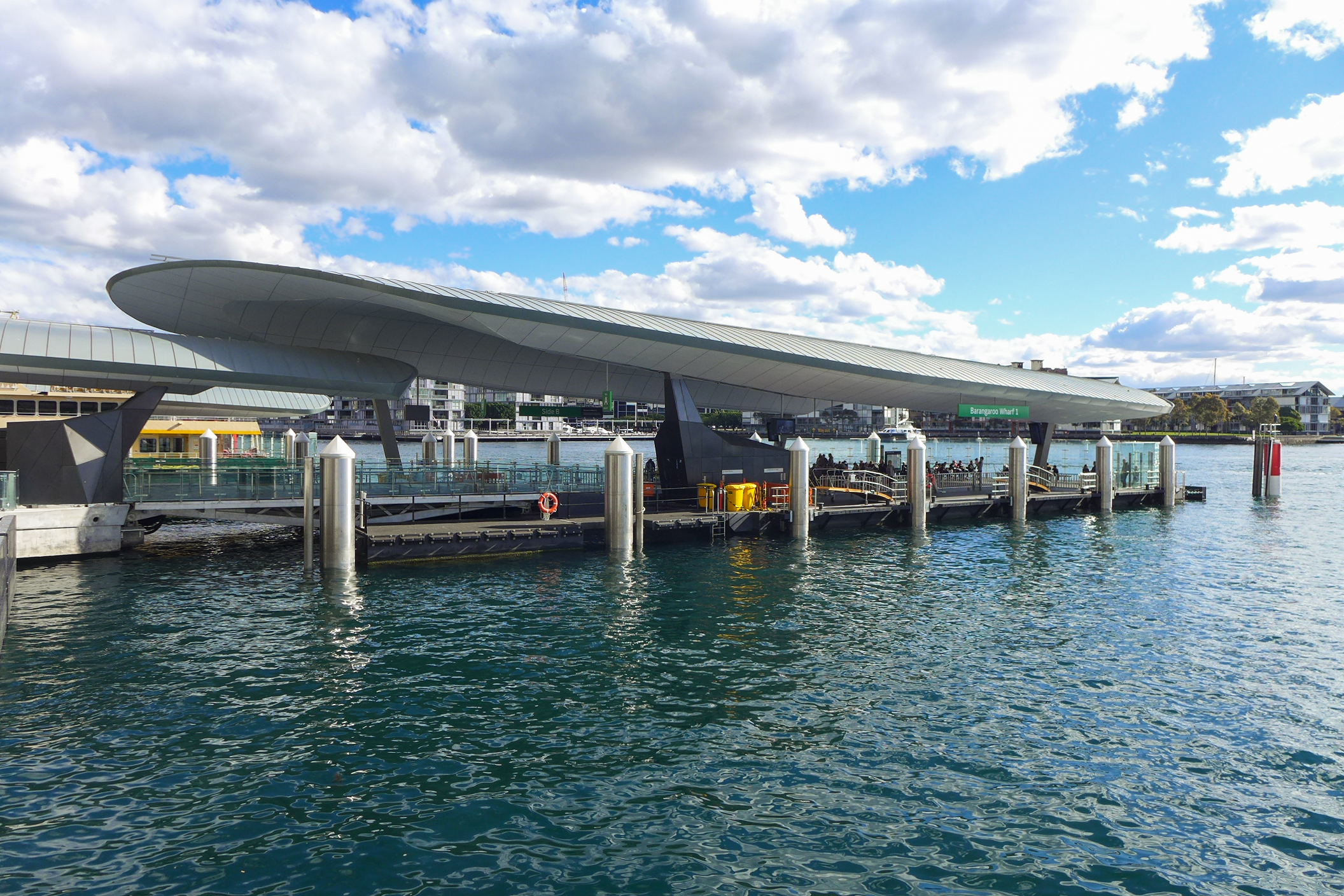
Barangaroo wharf

A new Barangaroo ferry wharf was built to act as a hub for ferry access from the western side of the Sydney central business district. The Barangaroo area, which had been a working port for years, had been a long-proposed site for urban renewal. Major construction of the redevelopment at Barangaroo began in 2011. In May 2013, the government outlined plans to build a new ferry terminal at Barangaroo to replace the nearby Darling Harbour wharf. As well as allowing for additional services on the F3 Parramatta River route, the increased capacity will allow additional routes to use the new wharves. It was proposed that all Sydney Ferries routes that used the Darling Harbour wharf would be rerouted to Barangaroo, with Darling Harbour to be decommissioned and handed back to private operation. The wharf opened in late June 2017. It offers a transport interchange with Wynyard railway station via Wynyard Walk, an underground pedestrian tunnel built to improve connections between the railway station and Barangaroo.

Many other wharves served by Sydney Ferries have been rebuilt during the decade. The new wharves use a largely shared design.

=== Ferry fleet ===
In November 2014, the government announced six new ferries would be ordered. Called the Emerald class, they operate on the Inner Harbour routes and are designed to look similar to the First Fleet class vessels. The first ferry was expected to enter service in late 2016. However, the entry into service was delayed due to problems uncovered during testing that required modifications to the design. The first ferry eventually entered service on 26 June 2017. The introduction of the Emerald class ferries allowed the final two Lady class ferries to be withdrawn in October 2017.

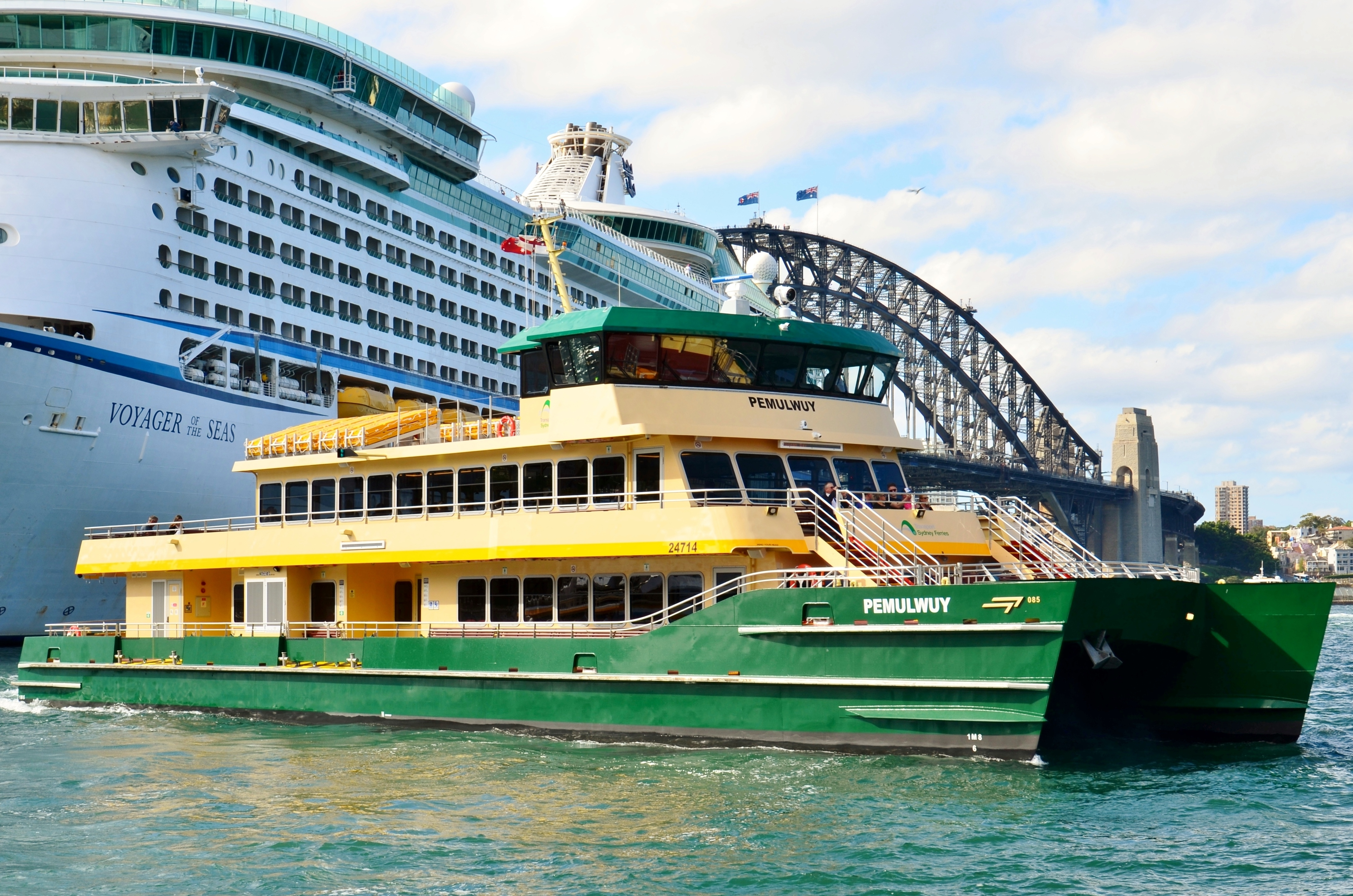
Introduced: Emerald class

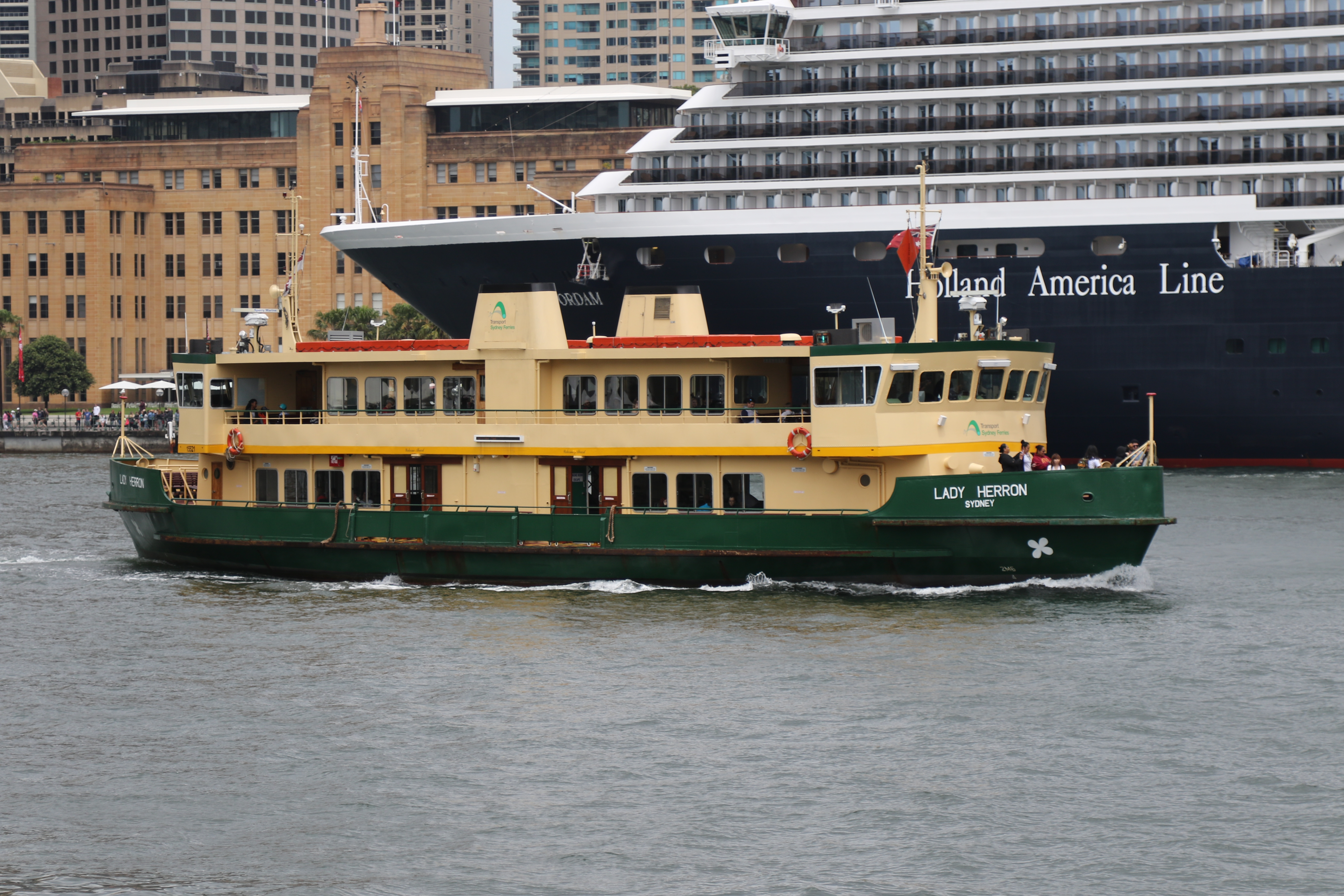
Withdrawn: Lady class

== Other ==
=== Western Sydney Airport ===
The construction of a Second Sydney Airport has been a long-standing issue for the city. A site located within the suburb of Badgerys Creek was officially designated by the Australian Government on 15 April 2014, bringing an end to decades of debate on the location of another airport within the Sydney basin. Western Sydney Airport is a planned 24-hour, curfew-free airport. Construction began in September 2018 and is expected to be completed in 2026.

=== Moorebank Intermodal Terminal ===
Moorebank Intermodal Terminal is under construction in the south-western suburb of Moorebank. In April 2012 the Australian Government committed to developing the Moorebank Intermodal Terminal with private sector involvement. The terminal will be built on 240 hectares of land formerly occupied by the Australian Army. The site will be connected to the Southern Sydney Freight Line near Casula station, providing access to Port Botany. It will also be close to the M5 Motorway and its junctions with the M7 and Hume Highway. Construction began in April 2017.
