= M12 Motorway (Sydney) =

Motorway in Sydney, New South Wales, Australia

M12 Motorway New South Wales

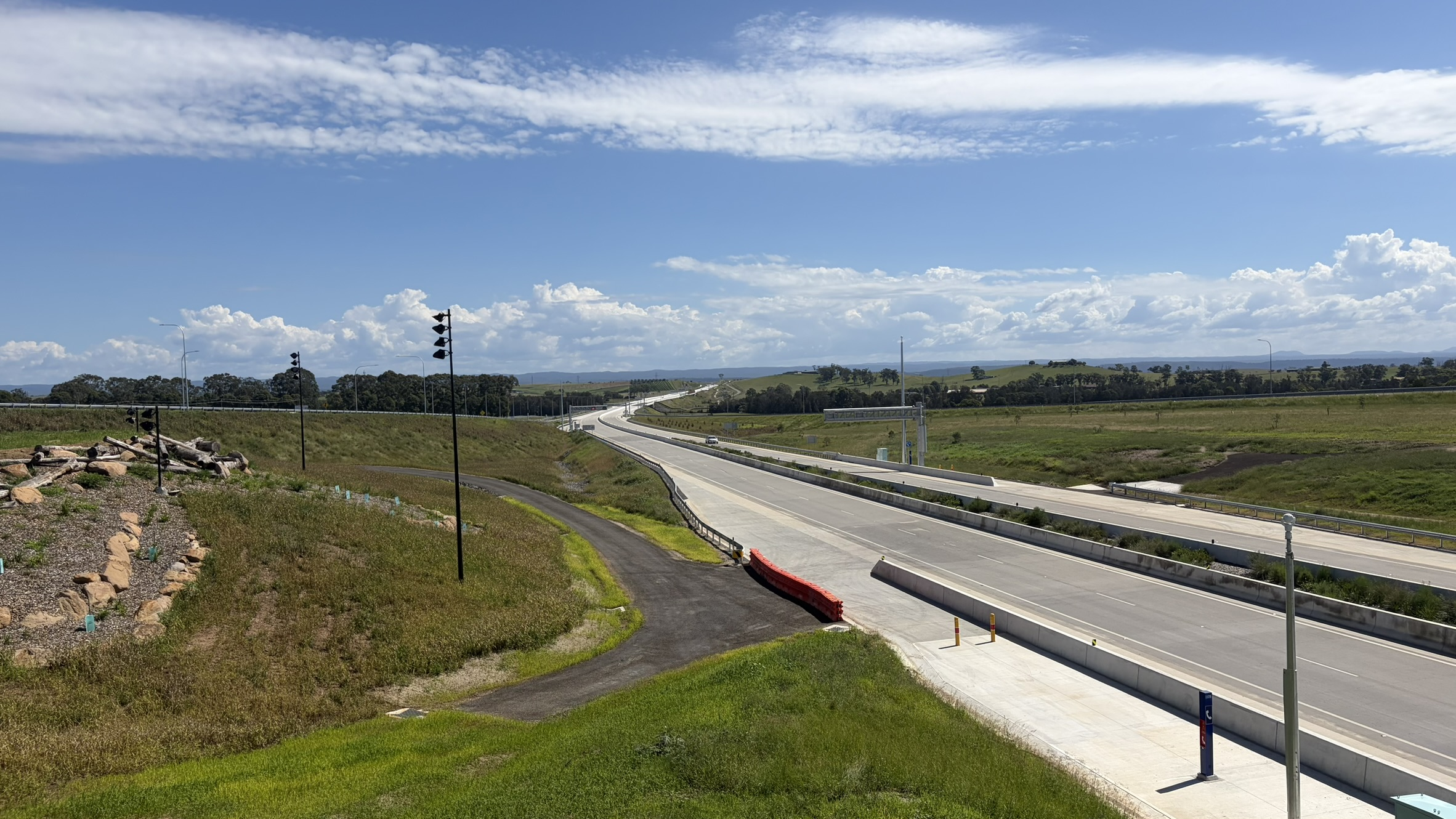
- The M12 Motorway in March 2026.

General information
- Type: Motorway
- Length: 15 km (9.3 mi)
- Opened: 14 March 2026
- Route number(s): M12

Major junctions
- East end: Westlink M7 (M7); Cecil Park, Sydney
- West end: The Northern Road (A9); Luddenham, Sydney

Location(s)
- Major suburbs / towns: Cecil Park, Cecil Hills, Mount Vernon, Kemps Creek, Badgerys Creek, Luddenham

Highway system
- Highways in Australia; National Highway • Freeways in Australia; Highways in New South Wales

The M12 Motorway is a toll-free east-west motorway in Sydney, New South Wales, Australia, linking the Westlink M7 motorway and The Northern Road, as part of the Western Sydney Infrastructure Plan. The four-lane motorway is 15 kilometres (9.3 mi) long and was built at a cost of $1.75 billion (with both state and federal funding). It provides direct access from the M7 Westlink motorway to Western Sydney Airport at Badgerys Creek.

Initially announced as the Western Sydney Airport Motorway in 2014, it later became known simply as M12. The motorway began construction in August 2022. Majority of the motorway opened on 14 March 2026, prior to the Western Sydney Airport opening to cargo in July 2026. The interchange with the M7 opened on 14 June that year.

== Alignment ==
The M12 Motorway runs between the Westlink M7 motorway and The Northern Road, including an exit to the access road towards the Western Sydney Airport. The motorway has four lanes, with provision to be widened to six lanes. It is also toll-free.

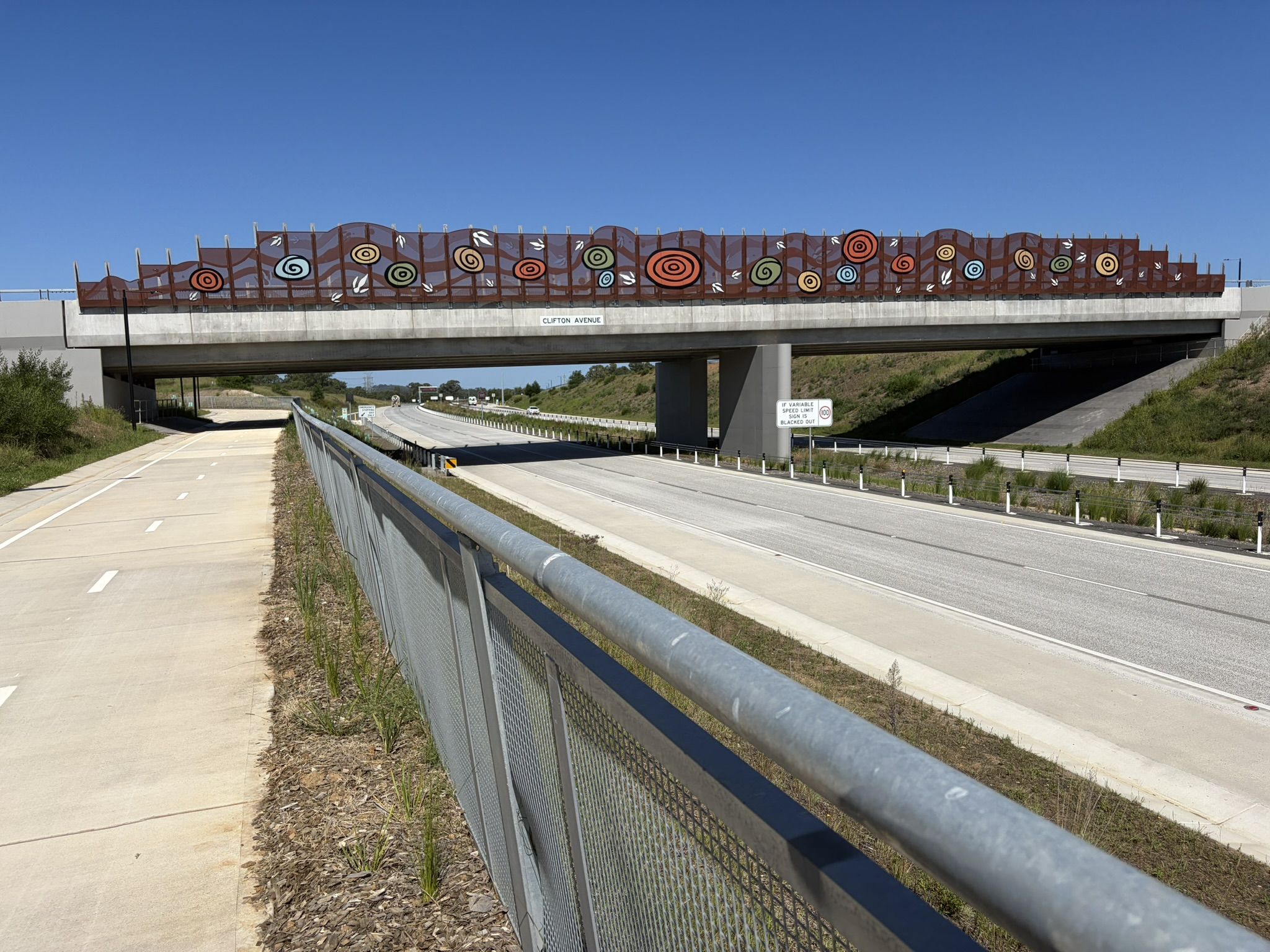
M12 Overpass Artwork

=== Elizabeth Drive ===
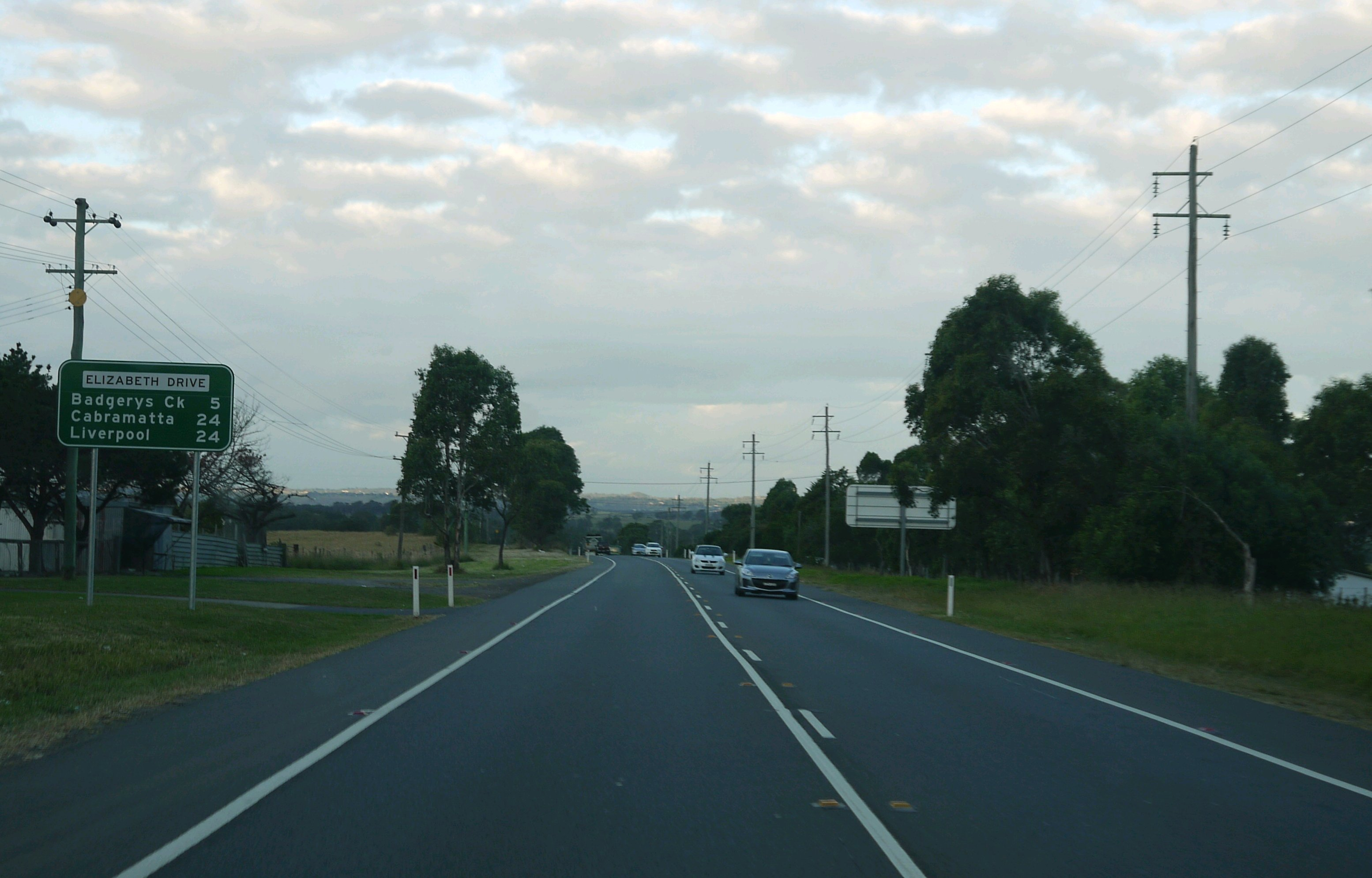
Elizabeth Drive, Luddenham, 2014

Elizabeth Drive is a two lane, single carriageway road linking the Hume Highway at Liverpool, with The Northern Road at Luddenham. Prior to the proposal to build the M12, Elizabeth Drive was one of several key thoroughfares in Western Sydney. The M12 motorway was constructed north of Elizabeth Drive and parallel to it.

== History ==
=== Planning ===
On 15 April 2014, the federal government announced Badgerys Creek to be the site of Sydney's second airport. To support infrastructure to the new airport, a joint federal-state road investment program known as Western Sydney Infrastructure Plan was also announced, which included a motorway linking the Westlink M7 motorway and The Northern Road to the new airport.

On 17 June 2014, as part of the State Budget, the NSW Government announced a $5.5 billion road package for Western Sydney. It included $6 million for planning the Western Sydney Airport motorway. The Budget was also the first time the name of the motorway was referred to. However, government media and press releases later simply referred to it as M12 Motorway.

The project was granted planning approval in April 2021.

=== Construction ===
Prior to the start of construction, it was planned that major construction would commence in 2022 with expected completion prior to the Western Sydney Airport opening in 2026.

The construction of the motorway was split into three sections. In June 2020, the companies shortlisted to build two of the three sections (central and west sections) were announced:

- 6-kilometre (3.7 mi) west section including the connection to the airport: Acciona, Fulton Hogan, CPB and Georgiou Group joint venture
- 7.5-kilometre (4.7 mi) central section from west of South Creek to Duff Road: CPB, Georgiou Group joint venture, and Seymour Whyte

In May 2022, Seymour Whyte and CPB Georgiou Group joint venture were announced as the contractors for the central and west sections respectively. Construction began in August 2022 on the west and central sections.

The third section (east section) consisted of an interchange with the M7 motorway. It was to be constructed together with the M7 motorway widening and the connection to Elizabeth Drive, known collectively as the M7–M12 Integration project. In December 2022, John Holland Group was announced as the contractor to design and construct the integration project. Construction began in August to October the following year.

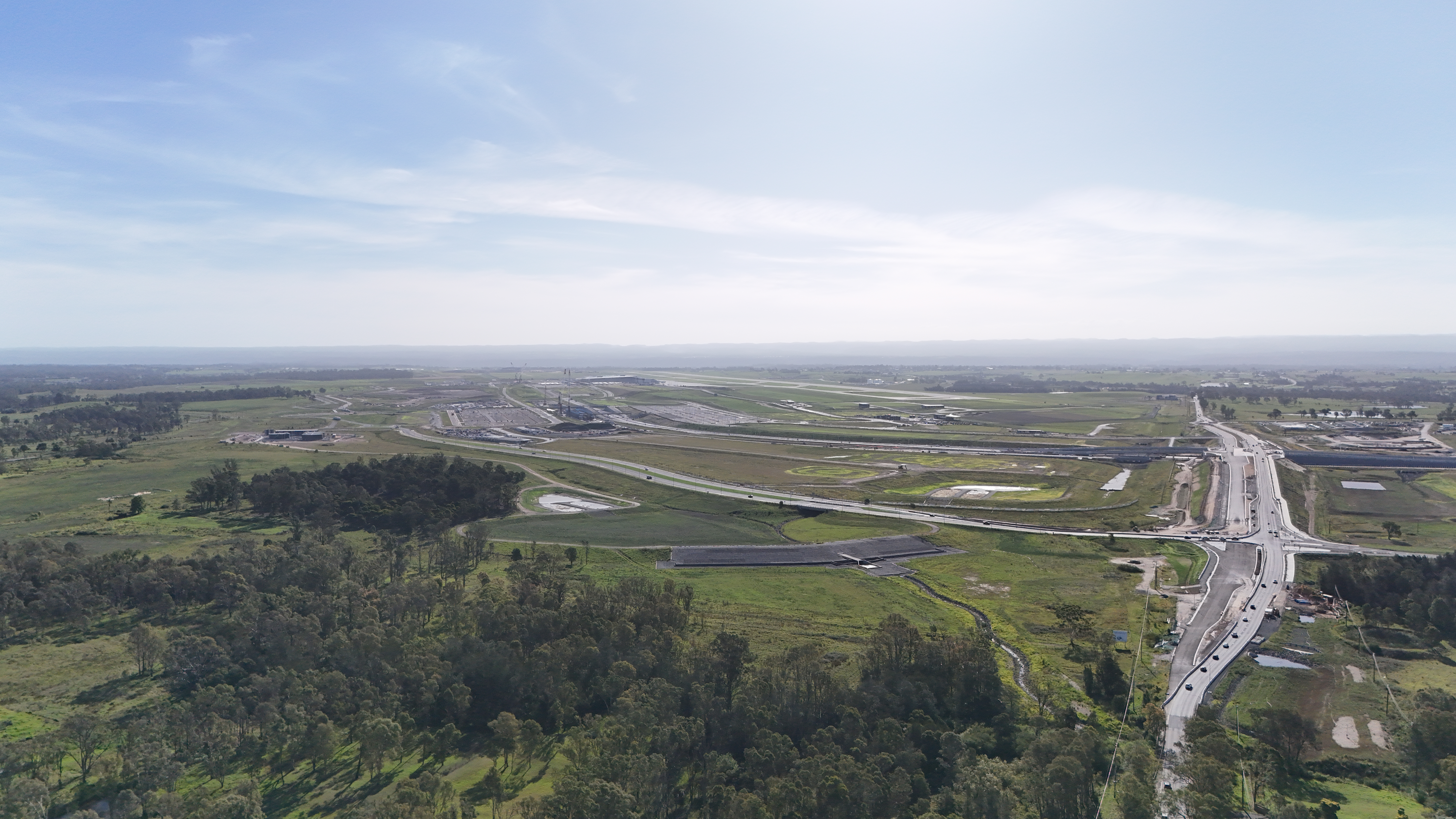
Motorway under construction in 2025

The west and central sections, as well as the connection to Elizabeth Drive in the east section, opened on 14 March 2026. The M7–M12 interchange opened on 14 June later that year.

== Exits and interchanges ==
LGA	Location	km	mi	Destinations	Notes
Penrith	Luddenham	0.0	0.0	The Northern Road (A9) – Wallacia, Campbelltown, Penrith, Windsor	Western terminus; at-grade intersection with traffic lights
Penrith	Badgerys Creek	4.5	2.8	Warami Drive, Western Sydney Airport, To Elizabeth Drive	
Liverpool	Cecil Hills	13.5	8.4	Elizabeth Drive – Luddenham, Cabramatta, Liverpool	Exit only
Liverpool	Cecil Hills	14.0	8.7	Elizabeth Drive – Cabramatta, Liverpool; Wallgrove Road – Horsley Park, Rooty Hill	Westbound entrance from Elizabeth Drive; Southbound entrance from Wallgrove Road
Fairfield–Liverpool boundary	Abbotsbury–Cecil Park–Cecil Hills tripoint	14.7	9.1	Westlink M7 (M7)	Eastern terminus
1.000 mi = 1.609 km; 1.000 km = 0.621 mi: Incomplete access; Tolled
