= Proposals for a second Sydney airport =

Proposals for a new Australian airport

The need for and location of a second airport serving Sydney, New South Wales, Australia, was the subject of much public and political debate. The new airport was intended to supplement or replace the city's existing Kingsford Smith Airport. Governments had debated the issue since the 1940s, but for decades had not pursued anything beyond preliminary investigations and precautionary land acquisition. The debate was settled in the 2010s when a site at Badgerys Creek was selected. With an estimated cost of between $6 and $8 billion, construction of the new airport began in September 2018 and will be completed by late 2026.

Since the construction of Kingsford Smith, aviation in Sydney has grown significantly. Between 1985 and 2015, total passenger movements through Sydney more than quadrupled from 9.2 million to 39.8 million. In 2015, 21% of all scheduled flights in Australia landed or took off at Kingsford Smith. The airport dealt with 45% of international passengers in 1998.

The Federal government made preliminary investigations and purchased land near Badgerys Creek in the 1980s and early 1990s. In May 2013, the Labor Gillard government released a technical study into the feasibility of Wilton as an airport site. By the time of the 2013 election, the Australian Labor Party had expressed support for the concept of a second airport, but did not support any particular site, whereas the then-Opposition Coalition was split on the issue, with some ministerial support for an airport at Badgerys Creek site while the then-Opposition Leader Tony Abbott had not committed to constructing an airport at all. The second airport was also opposed by the then Labor state government of New South Wales, which instead favoured increasing capacity at Kingsford Smith and building a high-speed rail connection between Sydney and Canberra Airport, although doubt had been cast on the viability of the latter option by a study in 2012.

In April 2014, following a further study, the Coalition Abbott government confirmed that the second Sydney airport site would be located at Badgerys Creek, known as Western Sydney Airport. In May 2017, the Turnbull government announced it would develop the second Sydney Airport, after the Sydney Airport Group declined the Government's offer to develop the second airport, and announced an investment of $5.3 billion in the project over four years in the 2017–18 Budget.

== History ==
In 1962, the state parliament debated the need for a second airport. It was decided that it should be built because Kingsford Smith had little room to expand. However, the need was not urgent, and it was decided to defer the planning and construction for at least 10 years. A new government body, the State Planning Authority (SPA), was created to oversee the future development of the region. The SPA had the primary task of planning the development of the new airport and the development of housing sites in the Western Sydney area to suit the growth of Sydney as the major city in Australia.

The SPA created a "no development zone" around the Badgerys Creek area in 1964 that would last for 20 years. This would give the government time to plan the airport and the infrastructure for it. This included roads and rail, and flight paths. Sydney was growing fast. Without the SPA, the area would have been subdivided and redeveloped and the airport would have cost far more to build.

There was a strong reaction from farmers who owned land in Badgerys Creek. Some wanted to subdivide and take a profit; some wanted to stay and farm the land. Every change of government saw a change to the airport planning and further delays while the politicians tried to buy the now valuable land at a low price and dislodge those who could remember back to 1962 and could see a huge profit from holding out.

Around Badgerys Creek, 20-litre paint tin lids with crude messages for the SPA were nailed to trees and power poles. These messages stayed until they rusted away and fell off, some lasting 20 years. The planning for second airports in Melbourne and Sydney started at the same time, but Melbourne opened its airport in 1970.

At the time of the original planning, the Badgerys Creek flight paths were over farm land to the south and over the sparsely populated suburb of Doonside to the north. Aircraft noise would not have been a problem and land would have been marked as "aircraft noise affected", had the plans been revealed.

=== 1946–1969: Towra Point proposal ===
In 1946, Towra Point in the south of Botany Bay was considered as a site for a second airport. Arthur Gietzelt, a member of Sutherland Shire Council, opposed the proposition, and in March 1969, the then Prime Minister (John Gorton) ruled out Towra Point as a potential site for a second airport, citing community noise problems. In 1973, the then Minister for Transport accused Gorton of ruling out Towra Point as a site to sweeten his chances at the 1969 election.

=== 1970s–1986: MANS Study ===
Planning for a second airport for Sydney commenced in the 1970s with the Major Airport Needs of Sydney (MANS) intergovernmental group established to select a site. In 1983 the newly elected Labor Federal Government hoped for quick decision, but it was not until 1986 that recommendations were made: Wilton or Badgerys Creek. The federal government under Bob Hawke decided upon Badgerys Creek, but in 1989 it also made the decision to permit the construction of the third runway at Kingsford Smith. This resulted in a great deal of political fallout, and the Keating government made limited moves towards the new airport at Badgerys Creek.

=== 1999: First Badgerys Creek proposal ===
At the 1996 election, then Australian Prime Minister John Howard announced that he would explore the option of a second airport at Holsworthy, but that option was rejected in 1998 and Badgerys Creek was confirmed as the preferred site in 1999. Commentators doubted if a major second airport for Sydney would ever be built, with a report given to the government in 1999 recommending that regional air travel be shifted to Bankstown Airport, a new general aviation airport be built at Badgerys Creek, a fast train between Sydney and Canberra be established, and investigation made on extension of the fast train to Melbourne and Brisbane.

=== 2000: Stalled ===
In December 2000, the Federal Government decided not to build the second airport and also shelved the very fast train scoping study, while keeping regional airlines at Kingsford Smith and expanding Bankstown and Canberra airports. In December 2003 John Anderson, the then transport minister, said "following exhaustive examination it is clear the existing airport at Mascot will be able to handle air traffic demands for a long time to come".

=== 2004–08: More studies ===
In May 2004, it was revealed that State and Federal parliaments had investigated the possibility of establishing the second Sydney airport at Well's Creek, not far from the townships of Sutton Forest, Berrima and Exeter. Before long however this option was discounted.

The issue arose again in 2008, following the 2007 election of the Rudd government. Convinced that capacity at the current airport would be exhausted, it began a search for a new site. The Federal Government wanted the second airport to be outside the Sydney basin and said it would examine alternatives from the Southern Highlands, to Newcastle and inland. Various options, including a freight-only airport operation, Camden, or converting part or all of RAAF Richmond and Canberra (or its nearby towns) as passenger and freight terminals were to be investigated for feasibility. Bankstown and Badgerys Creek, according to sources, were not to be included.

=== 2009: Canberra Airport proposal ===
In 2009, Canberra Airport management proposed that its facility would be the most appropriate location for a second Sydney airport, provided that a high-speed rail link (HSR) was built that reduced travel times between the cities to 50 minutes. Given existing development within the Sydney basin, a HSR link would probably be required whatever site is chosen, yet the Canberra option would potentially be cheaper overall. Existing infrastructure, such as the runways, terminals and navigational aids, would negate the need to develop a greenfields airport site. The estimated cost (in 2009) of the Sydney-to-Canberra link was A$8 billion to $10 billion.

=== 2009–12: Joint Federal/NSW Government Study ===
On Friday 2 March 2012 then Federal Transport Minister Anthony Albanese released a 3,200 page joint report costing $8m into Sydney's aviation capacity needs. Commissioned by the minister in 2009, the report was prepared by both state and federal bureaucrats, and private sector representatives. It examined 34 potential airport sites.

The study's major finding was that Badgerys Creek was "clearly the best site for a much-needed second airport for Sydney", describing the area as "the logical and most cost-effective site for another airport" The report also "calls for planning to begin on a second airport at Badgerys Creek" Badgerys' has been recommended by planners as an airport site since 1979, where 1700ha of land was acquired from 1986 to 1991 for an international airport, but had been rejected by both Labor and the Liberal-National party coalition politicians.

The full report: http://westernsydneyairport.gov.au/sydney_av_cap/files/sydney_aviation_capacity.pdf

==== Full capacity by 2027 ====
Sydney Airport is struggling to accommodate the demand for flights into and out of the city and, by 2027, the airport will not be able to accommodate any extra flights. The Sydney region passenger demand is forecast to more than double to 87 million passengers by 2035, and to double again by 2060.

The study showed another airport was needed by 2030 if Sydney was to keep growing at current rates. The study said this would delay flights across the country.

==== Economic costs of inaction ====
- A $60 billion cost to the economy by 2060 due to capacity constraints.

==== Mascot upgrades ====
The study "advocates keeping the existing 11pm to 6am curfew for flights to Sydney's Mascot airport." But it did recommend lifting the movement cap at Sydney Airport from 80 to 85 flights an hour. Albanese ruled out raising the movement cap.

When releasing the document Albanese reiterated that the government would not build an airport at Badgerys Creek. Albanese instead said the government would begin planning studies for the second-best airport site, Wilton; which is considerably further to the south, along the Hume Motorway near Picton. The report said Wilton would probably not attract enough business to be viable before 2030." The then NSW Premier, Barry O'Farrell, opposed a second airport in the Sydney basin, and revived that idea of using Canberra Airport, linked to Sydney by high-speed rail. NSW Minister for Transport, Gladys Berejiklian supported this, but the report stated that this option was not feasible.

==== New airport construction costs ====
Single-runway airport:

- A$1.7 billion for airport at Badgerys Creek or Wilton. $300m for transport links to Badgerys Creek and $2.3b for Wilton.

Parallel-runway International airport:

- A$5.3 billion for the airport. $1.7 billion for transport links to Badgerys Creek and A$5.7b for Wilton.
  - International Terminal $1,812 million
  - Domestic Terminal $583 million
  - Runways and Taxiways $551 million
  - Car parking $202 million
  - Project management and design $707 million

=== 2013–2018: Second Badgerys Creek proposal transitions into construction ===
In 2013 Bob Meyer, planner at Cox Richardson Architects, presented a report that said only 2,913 homes would be moderately impacted by aircraft noise if Badgerys Creek International Airport goes ahead. Most of the land surrounding the 17,000 hectare airport site is slated for industrial development, not residential, as part of the Western Sydney Employment Area.

In February 2013 an alliance of Western Sydney councils (WSROC) reversed their position against an airport at Badgerys Creek, with a majority of members now supporting the site, citing economic value to the area. The Gillard government further made clear it supported a second airport located in Sydney, but was awaiting a report due in March regarding the feasibility of their preferred Wilton location. While in Opposition, the Abbott-led Coalition did not commit to a position on that matter, but prominent shadow ministers, including Joe Hockey, voiced their support for an airport at Badgerys Creek. The NSW Government remained firm in its opposition to any Sydney location, favouring spending infrastructure dollars on a high-speed rail link to Canberra. The Sydney Airport Corporation continued to claim Kingsford-Smith has sufficient capacity.

In October 2013 The Daily Telegraph newspaper reported that Treasurer Joe Hockey had nominated a second Sydney airport at Badgerys Creek as one of the key infrastructure projects needed to stimulate the slowing Australian economy. The newspaper had earlier that month quoted Infrastructure Minister Warren Truss saying that "Badgerys Creek was chosen as the best site decades ago and is government-owned." In response to this news, The Sydney Morning Herald and The Daily Telegraph both reported that Qantas supported the proposal for establishing a curfew-free airport at Badgerys Creek, with Qantas, Jetstar and Qatar Airways saying they would use a Badgerys Creek airport for commercial flights.

In March 2014, the Sydney Morning Herald published a poll showing a 72% of NSW voters wanted an airport at Badgerys Creek.

On 15 April 2014, the Federal Government announced that Badgerys Creek will be the site of the Second Sydney Airport.

In the following years detailed proposals, environmental impact statement processes and enabling works commence, leading towards the commencement of formal construction of Stage 1 in 2018. (See Western Sydney Airport).

==== Cost and Design ====
After confirmation of Badgerys Creek as the site for Sydney's Second Airport, some Western Sydney residents and local politicians started voicing their opposition to a 24-hour airport. The reaction of most residents in the local area tends to be negative regarding the subject of the airport in their area.

In response, the Federal Government has focused on new jobs and new infrastructure investments including:

- $1.25b to build a new motorway from the Northern Road to the M7
- $1.6b to upgrade the Northern road to four lanes from Narellan to the M4
- $500m to upgrade the Bringelly Road to four lanes from the Northern road to Camden Valley Way
- New interchanges at Northern Road and Elizabeth Drive
- Linking the M4 with the new airport at Badgerys Creek

Critics however point out that this investment will simply route new traffic on to the already clogged M4, M7 and M5 complicating the commute of Western Sydney residents even further.

The new airport was initially proposed as a cargo-only facility. One negative reaction at that time was that the runway pointed directly at Sydney water resources stored by Warragamba Dam, not far from the dam. The orientation of the runway does not appear to have been changed. If not, this may still be an unaddressed negative because it was calculated at the time that 9 tonnes of aircraft fuel waste per week would potentially be released over the stored water.

== Timeline of preferred sites ==
- On 28 August 1973 the Minister for Transport Charlie Jones announced that Galston had been chosen by the Australian Government to meet Sydney's airport needs for the 1980s.
- On 17 February 1986 the Minister for Aviation Peter Morris announced that a second Sydney airport would be built at Badgerys Creek. The Government spent $170 million acquiring land and developing the Badgerys Creek site over the following decade.
- In 1997 the Howard government rejected an airport site at Holsworthy army camp, having spent $8 million investigating the location.
- On 14 May 2002 the Minister for Transport and Regional Services John Anderson told the Parliament that Government had concluded that Kingsford Smith Airport would be able to handle air traffic demand over the next decade, and that Bankstown Airport would be made available for any overflow traffic.
- On 27 July 2003 Simon Crean announced that Badgerys Creek was no longer a suitable site for Sydney's second airport and that a Labor government would not build an airport at the site.
- In 2012–13, at the end of their term in government, the Australian Labor Party's preferred site for a second airport was Wilton.
- In 2014 Prime Minister Tony Abbott confirmed that the Commonwealth government would proceed with Badgerys Creek as the site of Sydney's second airport with costings to be undertaken during their first term budgets.
- In September 2018, construction works began at the Badgerys Creek Airport site.

== See also ==
- List of airports in Greater Sydney
- List of airports in New South Wales
- Expansion of London Heathrow Airport
