= Western Sydney Infrastructure Plan =

Australian regional investment program

Western Sydney Infrastructure Plan (WSIP) is an A$4.1 billion 10-year road investment program in Western Sydney, New South Wales, jointly funded by the federal government ($3.3 billion) and the New South Wales state government. Originally introduced in April 2014 as a $3.5 billion program consisting of key road upgrade projects in Western Sydney, in conjunction with the newly-announced Western Sydney Airport project, the program scope was later expanded and funding was increased to $4.1 billion. The funding is now split among:

- The Northern Road Upgrade - $1.6 billion
- Bringelly Road upgrade - $500 million
- M12 Motorway - $1.75 billion
- Werrington Arterial Road - $50 million
- Glenbrook Intersection at Ross Street - $5.6 million
- Local Roads Package - $200 million

The plan was to take place over 10 years, starting with the Bringelly Road upgrade which commenced construction in January 2015. The last component to be completed was the M12 Motorway, which opened on 14 March 2026 and will be fully completed in mid-2026, prior to the completion of the new airport later that year.

== Projects ==
=== The Northern Road upgrade ===
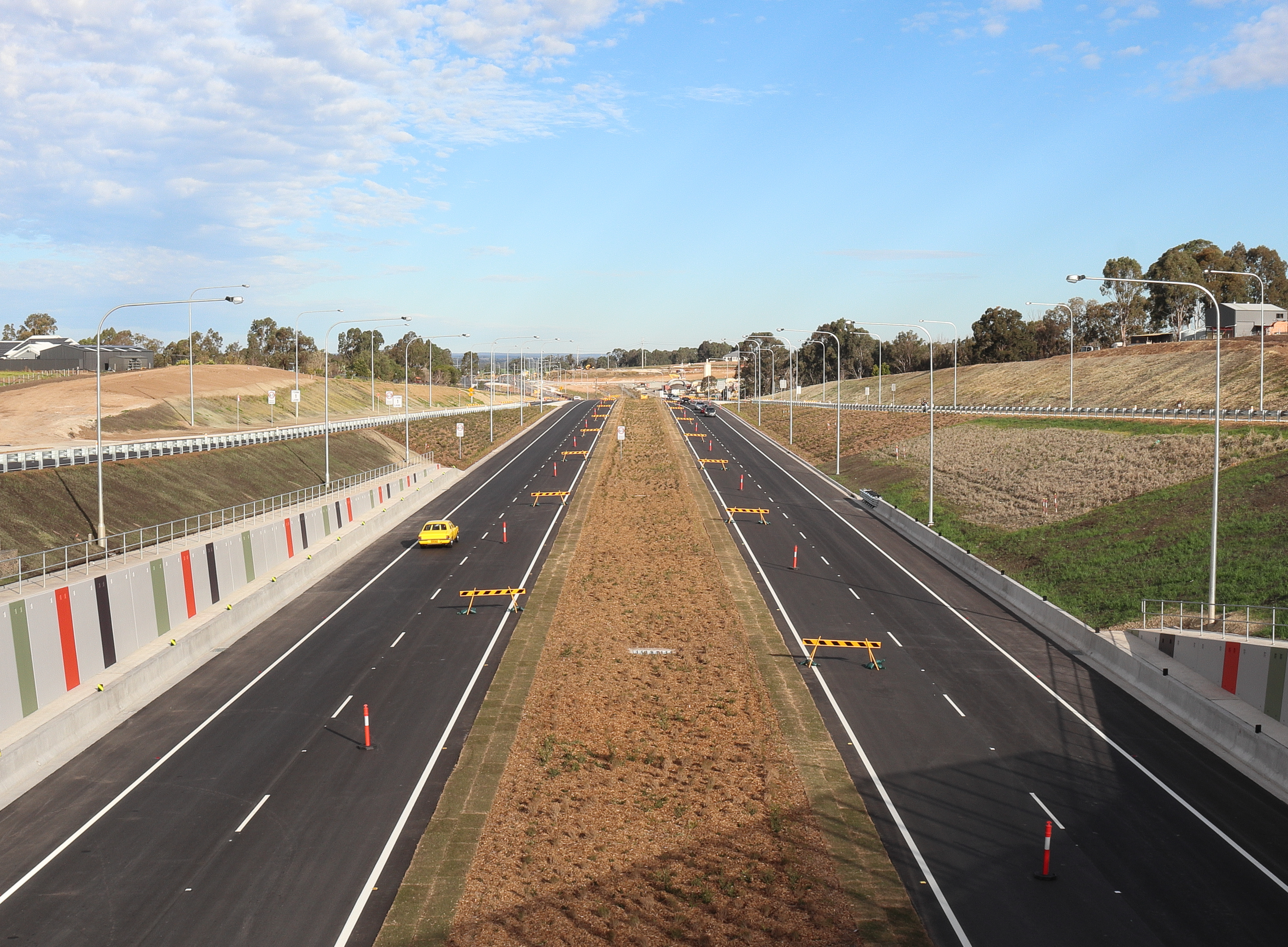
The Northern Road looking south at Bringelly Road interchange (stage 2)

$1.6 billion of the infrastructure plan was used to fund the upgrade of 35 km (21.7 mi) of The Northern Road between The Old Northern Road at Narellan and Jamison Road at South Penrith, including road widening to a minimum of four lanes. Originally made up of four stages, the project was delivered in six stages, numbered by chronological order of construction commencement.

Stage	Section	Construction dates		Notes
Stage	Section	Start	End	Notes
Stage 1	between The Old Northern Road at Narellan and Peter Brock Drive at Oran Park	February 2016	April 2018	
Stage 2	between Peter Brock Drive and Mersey Road at Bringelly	mid 2017	December 2020	Includes realignment of The Northern Road and an underpass interchange at Bringelly Road; New alignment and Bringelly Road interchange opened on 16 July 2020
Stage 3	between Glenmore Parkway at Glenmore Park and Jamison Road at South Penrith	mid 2017	May 2021	
Stage 4	between Mersey Road and Eaton Road at Luddenham	November 2018	11 September 2020	Involves realignment of The Northern Road around the airport site New alignment between Mersey Road and Eaton Road opened to traffic on 24 April 2020, with one lane per direction.
Stage 5	between Littlefields Road at Luddenham and Glenmore Parkway	February 2019	December 2021	Completed ahead of schedule (expected completion 2022)
Stage 6	between Eaton Road and Littlefields Road at Luddenham	mid 2019	March 2021	Involves realignment of The Northern Road to bypass the Luddenham town centre New alignment between Elizabeth Drive and Eaton Road including the Luddenham bypass opened to traffic on 13 December 2020

The stages arranged from north to south are stages 3, 5, 6, 4, 2 and 1. Some sections of Stages 4 to 6 that were critical to the delivery of the Western Sydney Airport were opened in stages from 2020.

=== Bringelly Road upgrade ===
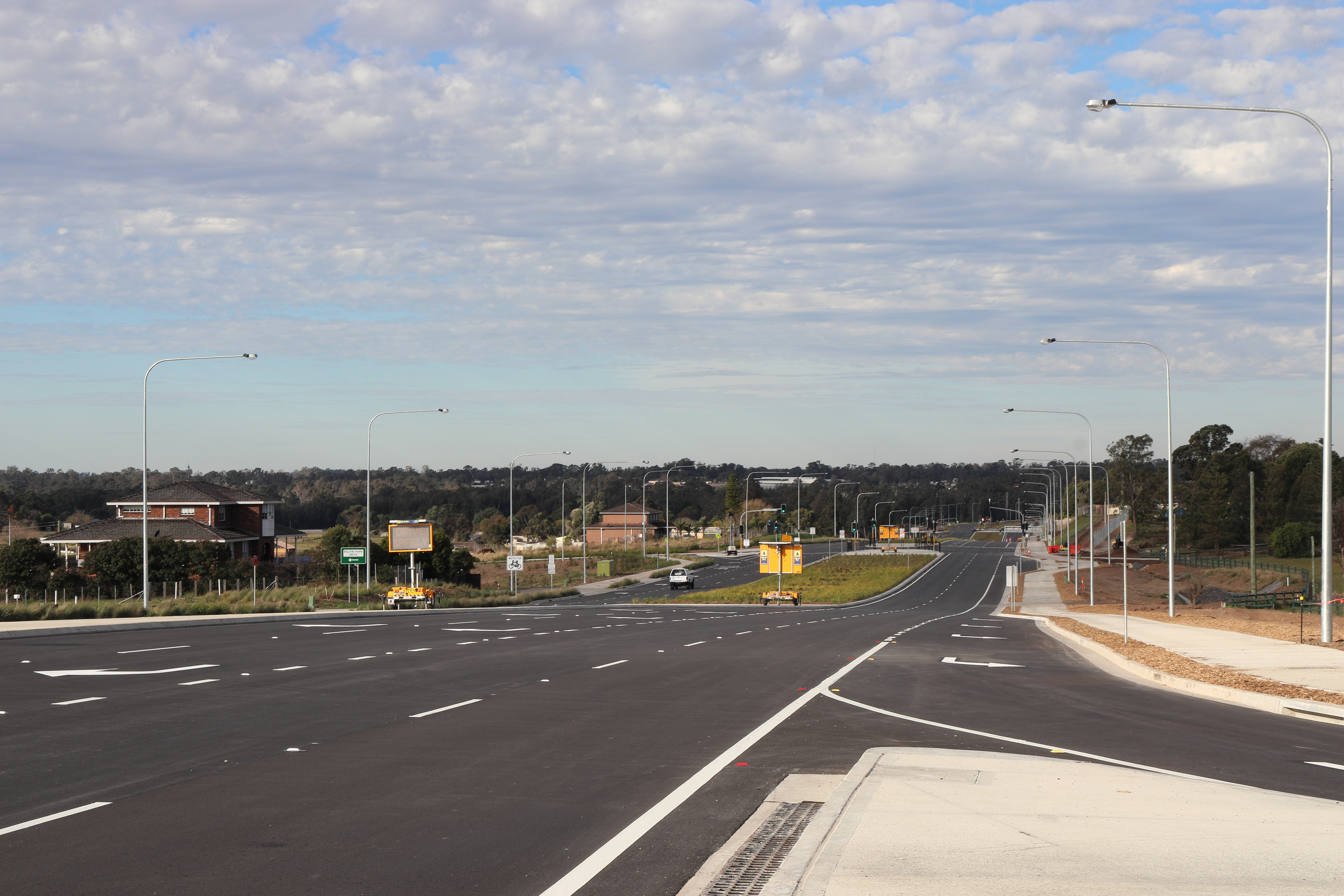
Bringelly Road stage 2 section

$509 million of the plan was used on the upgrade of the 10 km (6.2 mi) Bringelly Road, which was delivered in two stages between Camden Valley Way at Leppington and The Northern Road at Bringelly. The upgrade works included widening of the road with a central median, and implementing a speed limit of 80 km/h along the road. A new underpass with The Northern Road was also constructed as part of The Northern Road upgrade, opened in July 2020.

The first stage between Camden Valley Way and King Street at Rossmore, commenced construction in January 2015 and opened to traffic in December 2018. The second stage between King Street and The Northern Road was completed in December 2020.

=== M12 Motorway ===
The plan includes the 16 km (9.9 mi) M12 Motorway, which will provide direct access between the Western Sydney Airport and Sydney's motorway network at M7 motorway. The federal government has committed $1.4 billion towards the delivery of the $1.75 billion motorway. Construction commenced in August 2022 and majority of the motorway opened on 14 March 2026, prior to the opening of the airport. The interchange with M7 will open later that year.

=== Werrington Arterial Road ===
The Werrington Arterial Road was the first major project of the infrastructure plan to be completed, involving the upgrade of Gipps Street between Great Western Highway and M4 Western Motorway in Werrington. Upgrade works including road widening, new entry and exit ramps to the M4, and intersection upgrades. The federal government contributed 50 per cent of the cost of the $52 million upgrade. Construction commenced in March 2015 and was completed in May 2017.

=== Glenbrook Intersection at Ross Street ===
The intersection of Great Western Highway and Ross Street at Glenbrook was upgraded and completed in October 2018. Works include new traffic lights at the intersection with pedestrian crossings, and closing access to the Great Western Highway from Hare Street (south), but maintaining access for emergency vehicles. The federal government funded $2.5 million towards the $5.6 million project.

=== Local Roads Package ===
The federal government is investing $200 million in a Local Roads Package, a competitive rounds-based program which allows Western Sydney councils to deliver improved road connections that support the infrastructure plan. As of April 2019, round 1 projects are complete and round 2 projects underway or complete, and project proposals for Round 3 projects are currently under assessment. Eligible councils include Liverpool, Camden, Wollondilly, Campbelltown, Penrith, Fairfield and Blacktown councils. An example of the projects was the intersection upgrade of Cumberland Highway at Hamilton Road, St Johns Road and John Street, which was completed under the Local Roads Package after Fairfield Council was granted $5.8 million over two years.
