= List of Anglican schools in Australia =

Below is a list of all Anglican schools in Australia.

== Australian Capital Territory ==
- Canberra Girls Grammar School
- Canberra Grammar School
- Radford College
- Burgmann Anglican School

== New South Wales ==
- Abbotsleigh
- All Saints College, Bathurst
- Anglican Technical College
- Arden Anglican School
- Arndell Anglican College
- Barker College
- Bishop Druitt College
- Bishop Tyrrell Anglican College
- Blue Mountains Grammar School
- Broughton Anglican College
- Calrossy Anglican School
- Claremont College
- Clarence Valley Anglican School
- Cranbrook School
- Danebank Anglican School for Girls
- Emmanuel Anglican College
- Georges River Grammar
- Kambala School
- Lakes Grammar
- Lindisfarne Anglican Grammar School
- Loquat Valley Anglican Preparatory School
- Macarthur Anglican School
- Macquarie Anglican Grammar School
- Mamre Anglican School
- Manning Valley Anglican College
- Meriden School
- Moama Anglican Grammar School
- Mosman Church of England Preparatory School
- New England Girls' School
- Newcastle Grammar School
- Nowra Anglican College
- Oran Park Anglican College
- Orange Anglican Grammar School
- Penrith Anglican College
- Richard Johnson Anglican School
- Roseville College
- Rouse Hill Anglican College
- Sapphire Coast Anglican College (formerly Bega Valley Christian College)
- SCECGS Redlands
- SCEGGS Darlinghurst
- Scone Grammar School
- Shellharbour Anglican College
- Shoalhaven Anglican School
- Snowy Mountains Grammar School
- St Andrew's Cathedral School
- St Catherine's School, Waverley
- St Columba Anglican School
- St Luke's Grammar School
- St Paul's Grammar School
- St Peter's Anglican Primary School
- Sydney Church of England Grammar School (SHORE)
- Tara Anglican School for Girls
- The Anglican School Googong
- The Armidale School
- The Illawarra Grammar School
- The King's School
- The Riverina Anglican College
- Thomas Hassall Anglican College
- Trades Norwest Anglican College
- Trinity Anglican College Albury Campus
- Trinity Grammar School
- Tudor House School
- William Clarke College
- Wollondilly Anglican College

== Queensland ==
- All Saints Anglican School
- All Souls St Gabriels School
- Anglican Church Grammar School
- Cannon Hill Anglican College
- Canterbury College
- Coomera Anglican College
- Fraser Coast Anglican College
- Hillbrook Anglican School
- Matthew Flinders Anglican College
- Springfield Anglican College
- St Aidan's Anglican Girls' School
- St Andrew's Anglican College
- St Hilda's School
- St John's Anglican College, Brisbane
- St Luke's Anglican School
- St Margaret's Anglican Girls' School
- St Paul's School
- The Cathedral School
- The Glennie School
- The Southport School
- Toowoomba Anglican College and Preparatory School
- Trinity Anglican School
- West Moreton Anglican College
- Whitsunday Anglican School

== Victoria ==
- Ballarat and Queen's Anglican Grammar School
- Beaconhills College
- Brighton Grammar School
- Camberwell Girls Grammar School
- Camberwell Grammar School
- Cathedral College
- Caulfield Grammar School
- Christ Church Grammar School
- Cobram Anglican Grammar School
- Firbank Grammar School
- Geelong Grammar School
- Gippsland Grammar School
- Hume Anglican Grammar
- Ivanhoe Girls' Grammar School
- Ivanhoe Grammar School
- Korowa Anglican Girls' School
- Lowther Hall Anglican Grammar School
- Melbourne Girls Grammar School
- Melbourne Grammar School
- Mentone Girls' Grammar School
- Mentone Grammar
- Overnewton Anglican Community College
- Shelford Girls' Grammar
- St Michael's Grammar School
- St Paul's Anglican Grammar School
- Peninsula Grammar
- Tintern Grammar
- Trinity Anglican College, Wodanga Campus
- Trinity Grammar School, Kew
- Yarra Valley Grammar

== South Australia ==
- Investigator College Goolwa Campus
- Pedare Christian College
- Pulteney Grammar School
- St Andrew's School
- St Columba College
- St John's Grammar School
- St Peter's College
- St Peter's Collegiate Girls' School
- St Peter's Woodlands Grammar School
- Trinity College
- Walford Anglican School for Girls
- Woodcroft College

== Tasmania ==
- Launceston Church Grammar School
- St Michael's Collegiate School
- The Hutchins School

== Western Australia ==
- All Saints' College
- Bunbury Cathedral Grammar School
- Court Grammar School
- Christ Church Grammar School
- Esperance Anglican Community School
- Frederick Irwin Anglican School
- Georgiana Molloy Anglican School
- Geraldton Grammar School
- Guildford Grammar School
- Hale School
- John Septimus Roe Anglican Community School
- John Wollaston Anglican Community School
- Perth College
- Peter Carnley Anglican Community School
- Peter Moyes Anglican Community School
- St George's Anglican Grammar School
- St Hilda's Anglican School for Girls
- St James' Anglican School
- St Mark's Anglican Community School
- St Mary's Anglican Girls' School
- Swan Valley Anglican Community School

== See also ==
- Anglican education in Australia
- Lists of schools in Australia
