= List of Anglican schools in New South Wales =

Below is list of the 64 Anglican schools in the state of New South Wales.

| School | Suburb or Town | M/F/Co-ed | Diocese | Founded |
|---|---|---|---|---|
| Abbotsleigh | Wahroonga | F | Sydney | 1885 |
| Arden Anglican School | Beecroft | Co-ed | Sydney | 1922 |
| Arndell Anglican College | Oakville | Co-ed | Sydney | 1990 |
| Barker College | Hornsby | Co-ed | Sydney | 1890 |
| Bishop Druitt College | Coffs Harbour | Co-ed | Grafton | 1994 |
| Bishop Tyrrell Anglican College | Fletcher | Co-ed | Newcastle | 1999 |
| Blue Mountains Grammar School | Wentworth Falls | Co-ed | Sydney | 1917 |
| Broughton Anglican College | Campbelltown | Co-ed | Sydney | 1986 |
| Calrossy Anglican School | Tamworth | Co-ed | Armidale | 1919 |
| Claremont College | Randwick | Co-ed | Sydney | 1882 |
| Clarence Valley Anglican School (formerly The Cathedral School) | Grafton and Clarenza | Co-ed | Grafton | 1998 |
| Cranbrook School | Bellevue Hill | M | Sydney | 1918 |
| Danebank | Hurstville | F | Sydney | 1933 |
| Emmanuel Anglican College | Ballina | Co-ed | Grafton | 1998 |
| Georges River Grammar School (formerly Bankstown Grammar School) | Georges Hall | Co-ed | Sydney | 1986 |
| Kambala | Rose Bay | F | Sydney | 1887 |
| Lakes Grammar – An Anglican School | Warnervale | Co-ed | Newcastle | 2004 |
| Lindisfarne Anglican Grammar School | Terranora | Co-ed | Grafton | 1981 |
| Macarthur Anglican School | Cobbitty | Co-ed | Sydney | 1984 |
| Macquarie Anglican Grammar School | Dubbo | Co-ed | Bathurst | 2002 |
| Mamre Anglican School (formerly Mamre Christian College) | Erskine Park | Co-ed | Sydney | 1978 |
| Manning Valley Anglican College | Cundletown | Co-ed | Newcastle | 2003 |
| Marsden Park Anglican College | Marsden Park | Co-ed | Sydney | 2024 |
| Meriden School | Strathfield | F | Sydney | 1897 |
| Moama Anglican Grammar School | Moama | Co-ed | Riverina | 2005 |
| Mosman Church of England Preparatory School | Mosman | M | Sydney | 1904 |
| New England Girls' School | Armidale | Co-ed & F | Armidale | 1895 |
| Newcastle Grammar School | Newcastle | Co-ed | Newcastle | 1859 |
| Northholm Grammar School | Arcadia | Co-ed | Sydney | 1983 |
| Nowra Anglican College | Bomaderry | Co-ed | Sydney | 2000 |
| Orange Anglican Grammar School | Orange | Co-ed | Bathurst | 2007 |
| Oran Park Anglican College | Oran Park | Co-ed | | 2017 |
| Penrith Anglican College | Orchard Hills | Co-ed | Sydney | 1998 |
| Redlands (formerly SCECGS Redlands and Sydney Church of England Co-educational Grammar School, Redlands) | Cremorne | Co-ed | Sydney | 1884 |
| Richard Johnson Anglican School | Oakhurst | Co-ed | Sydney | 1997 |
| Roseville College | Roseville | F | Sydney | 1908 |
| Rouse Hill Anglican College | Rouse Hill | Co-ed | Sydney | 2002 |
| Sapphire Coast Anglican College, Bega Campus (formerly Bega Valley Christian College, Bega Campus) | Bega | Co-ed | Canberra and Goulburn | 1994 |
| Sapphire Coast Anglican College, Southern Campus (formerly Bega Valley Christian College, Southern Campus) | Pambula | Co-ed | Canberra and Goulburn | 1994 |
| SCEGGS Darlinghurst | Darlinghurst | F | Sydney | 1895 |
| Scone Grammar School | Scone | Co-ed | Newcastle | 1887 |
| Shellharbour Anglican College | Dunmore | Co-ed | Sydney | 2004 |
| Shoalhaven Anglican School | Milton | Co-ed | Canberra and Goulburn | 1991 |
| SHORE – Sydney Church of England Grammar School | North Sydney | Co-ed & M | Sydney | 1889 |
| Snowy Mountains Grammar School | Jindabyne | Co-ed | Canberra and Goulburn | 1996 |
| St Andrew's Cathedral School | Sydney | Co-ed | Sydney | 1885 |
| St Catherine's School | Waverley | F | Sydney | 1856 |
| St Columba Anglican School | Port Macquarie | Co-ed | Grafton | 2002 |
| St Luke's Grammar School | Dee Why | Co-ed | Sydney | 1993 |
| St Peter's Anglican College | Broulee | Co-ed | Canberra and Goulburn | 2003 |
| St Peter's Anglican Primary School | Campbelltown | Co-ed | Sydney | 1983 |
| Tara Anglican School for Girls | North Parramatta | F | Sydney | 1897 |
| The Anglican School Googong | Googong | Co-ed | | 2015 |
| The Armidale School | Armidale | Co-ed & M | Armidale | 1894 |
| The Illawarra Grammar School | West Wollongong | Co-ed | Sydney | 1959 |
| The King's School | North Parramatta | M | Sydney | 1831 |
| The Riverina Anglican College | Wagga Wagga | Co-ed | Canberra and Goulburn | 1999 |
| Thomas Hassall Anglican College | West Hoxton | Co-ed | Sydney | 2000 |
| Trinity Anglican College – Albury | Thurgoona | Co-ed | Wangaratta | 2002 |
| Trinity Grammar School | Summer Hill | M | Sydney | 1913 |
| Trinity Grammar School Preparatory School | Strathfield | M | Sydney | 1938 |
| Tudor House School | Moss Vale | M | Sydney | 1897 |
| William Clarke College | Kellyville | Co-ed | Sydney | 1988 |
| Wollondilly Anglican College | Tahmoor | Co-ed | Sydney | 2004 |

== See also ==
- List of non-government schools in New South Wales
- Anglican education in Australia
