= The Crusader Union of Australia =

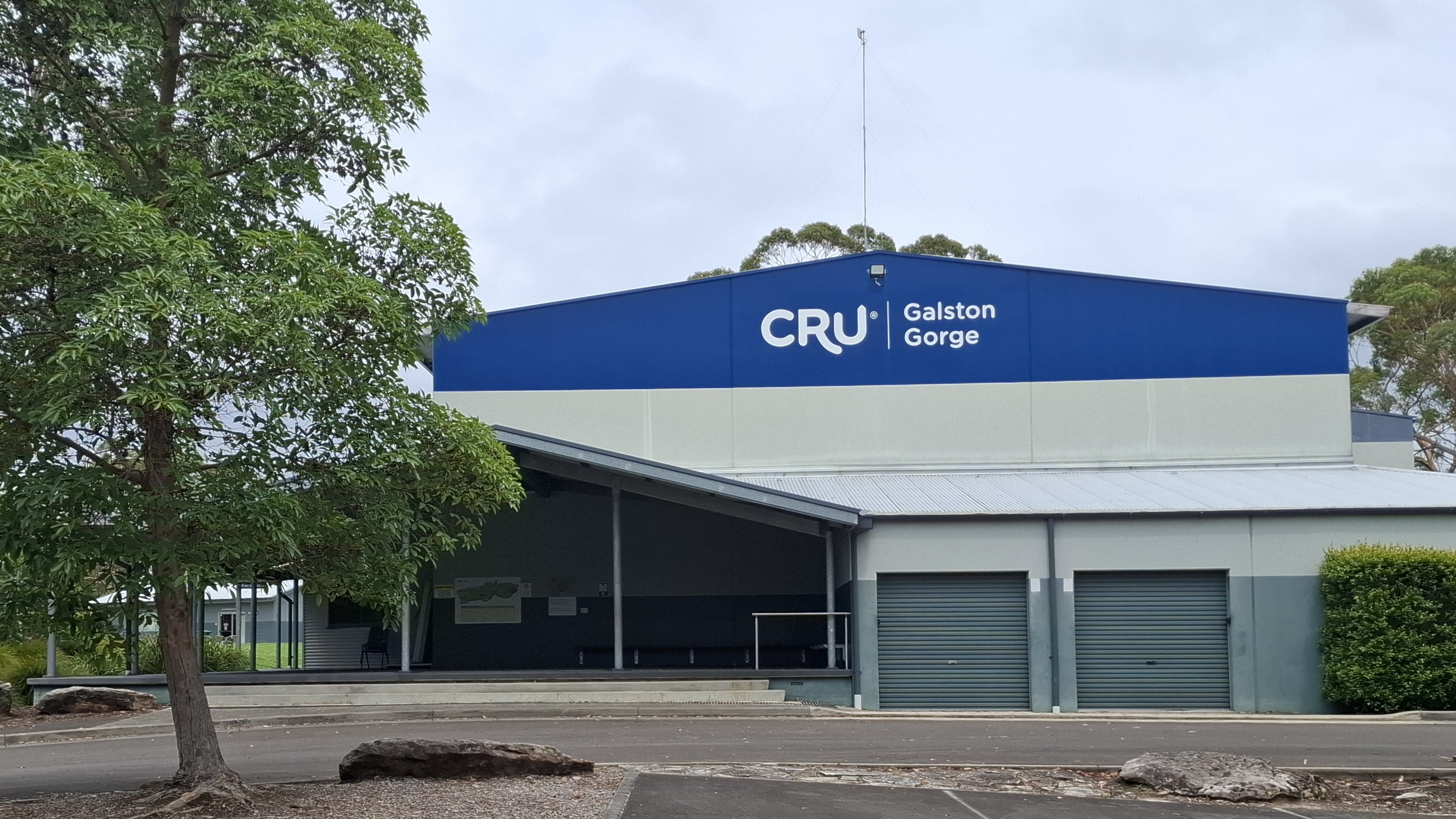
- Entrance at CRU Galston Gorge
- Abbreviation: Crusaders or CRU
- Formation: 1930; 96 years ago
- Purpose: To nurture church membership and train young Christians
- Headquarters: Eastwood, New South Wales
- Region served: New South Wales, Australian Capital Territory & Western Australia
- Chief Executive Officer: Nick Hood
- Staff: 71 (2015)
- Volunteers: 1,279 (2026)
- Website: www.cru.edu.au
- Formerly called: The Crusader Union of New South Wales

The Crusader Union of Australia (Crusaders or CRU), is an Australian interdenominational, non-profit Christian youth organisation. It runs various camps, undertakes ministry in schools and offers training in first aid. The organisation runs two campsites at Galston Gorge and Lake Macquarie in New South Wales.

== History ==
The Crusaders movement first begun in the United Kingdom in the early 1900s, with the first Crusaders' Union being founded in London and Brighton on 29 March 1906. This movement spread to Australia, with the first Crusaders' Unions being founded in 1928 in Victoria. Two years later, in 1930, a visit by British Anglican minister Howard Guinness led to the formation of Crusader Unions in other Australian states, including New South Wales. The Crusaders' Union established in New South Wales is where the modern Crusader Union of Australia descends from.

Guinness was keen to strengthen Christian work among school students in independent schools. He saw voluntary groups as a key to achieving this. The first Crusader Camp was held in New South Wales over Easter 1930, and by September the organisational structure of the Crusader Union was established.

The Crusader Union consulted with the British Crusaders' Union, with the aim of adopting a modified version of their logo and constitution. However the British Crusaders objected to affiliation due to the distances between the countries, and remarked that Australian schools “did not correspond in rank” to theirs. The logo adopted by the Boys Division in 1933 and the logo used by the British Crusaders are nearly identical, with the inclusion of the Southern Cross and location of the knightly helmet the only differences between the two.

In 1933, the Crusader Union of Queensland was established, holding an initial camp at Currumbin. The Girls' Crusader Union of Queensland organised a holiday study camp for school students at the end of that year.

The Crusader Union of South Australia was also founded around this time, and was organising events by 1934.

Following a visit by Guinness to Western Australia in 1934, the Crusader Union of Western Australia was formed. Edna Carlon was the first president of the Girls' Crusader Union of Western Australia. At that time other organisations with a similar mission, and also calling themselves Crusaders, had begun to appear in Western Australia. By the 1950s, annual Crusader camps were organised in Western Australia.

As of 1952, the Crusader Union had forty branches operating in Victoria and had begun work on a permanent campsite at Toolangi. By 1954, the Crusader Union had 150 branches across Australia and New Zealand, however, in 1955 the Crusader Union merged with Scripture Union in all states except for New South Wales.

=== Crusader Union of New South Wales ===
During the 1960s, the Crusader Union of New South Wales became a registered company limited by guarantee to meet legal requirements. Initially established in Sydney's CBD, the office relocated to Strathfield in 1988, then Eastwood in 1993. In 1964, the Crusader Union held Study Camps for high school students for the first time. By 2018, over 440 Sydney school students attended these camps annually.

=== Crusader Union of Australia ===
The Crusader Union of NSW became the Crusader Union of Australia on 23 May 1990 and the Crusader ‘eagle’ logo was introduced in 1997. As of 2000 the Crusader Union had an annual attendence of 1,500 school children on all types of camps it held.

In 2002, the CRU Camp brand was trademarked. In 2019, the 'eagle' logo was phased out and replaced with the current stylised letters.

After thirty-four years as CEO, Gary Hill stood down in November 2025 and was replaced by Nick Hood.

== Campsites ==
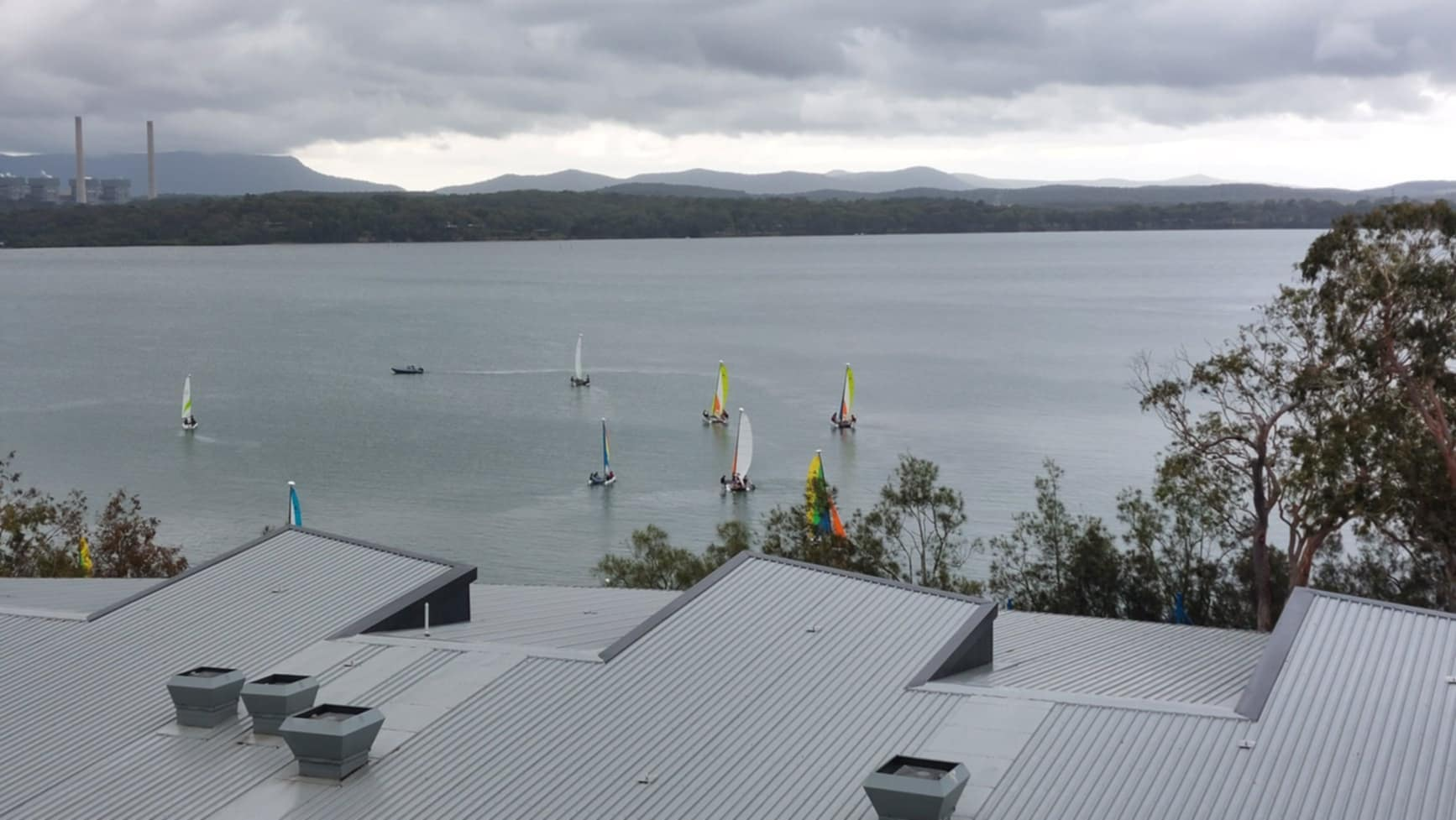
Sailing Boats belonging to CRU Lake Mac sailing on Lake Macquarie with Eraring Power Station in the background.

The first camps run by the Crusader Union were on rented land. Due to the condition of the campsites being outside the control of the organisation, in 1943 the decision was made to purchase their own sites. Four sites were purchased in Galston Gorge, Lake Macquarie, and along the Colo River in New South Wales and in Toolangi in Victoria.

=== Lake Mac ===
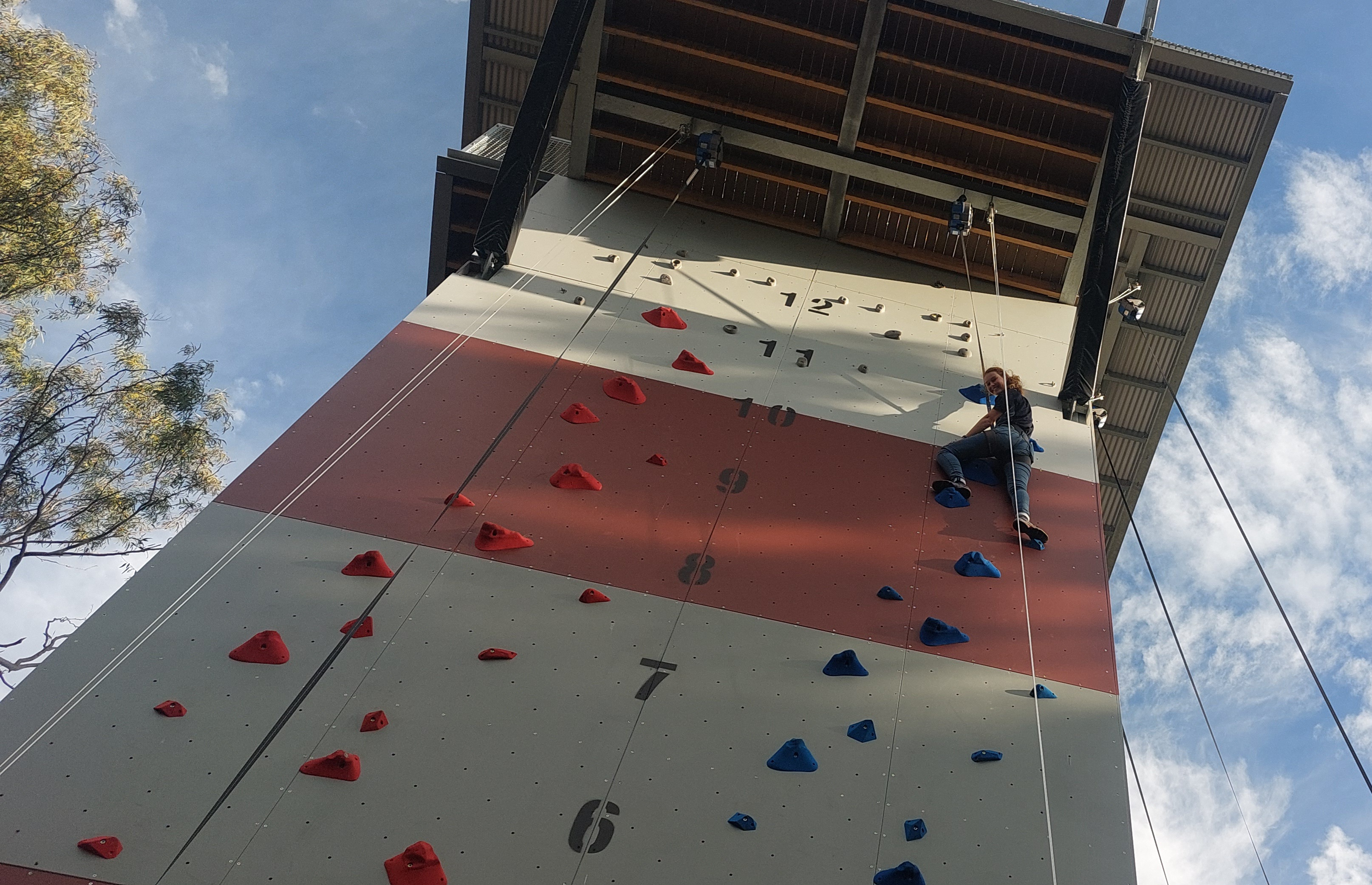
Northern Rock Climbing Tower at CRU Lake Mac

The campsite in Lake Macquarie, known today as CRU Lake Mac, was acquired by the Crusader Union of NSW in 1946. Leslie Parr had expressed interested in using his land on the shore of Lake Macquarie as a site for a youth group and donated his land. At that time the land was bushland, and not connected to any roadways. In 1957, the ‘Hilltop’ Hall was constructed at CRU Lake Mac, and construction of six ‘Timber Tent’ cabins begun in 1968, with an additional four built in June 1970. That same year hot water was first supplied to the campsite. In 1993, a rock climbing and abseiling tower was constructed at the site.

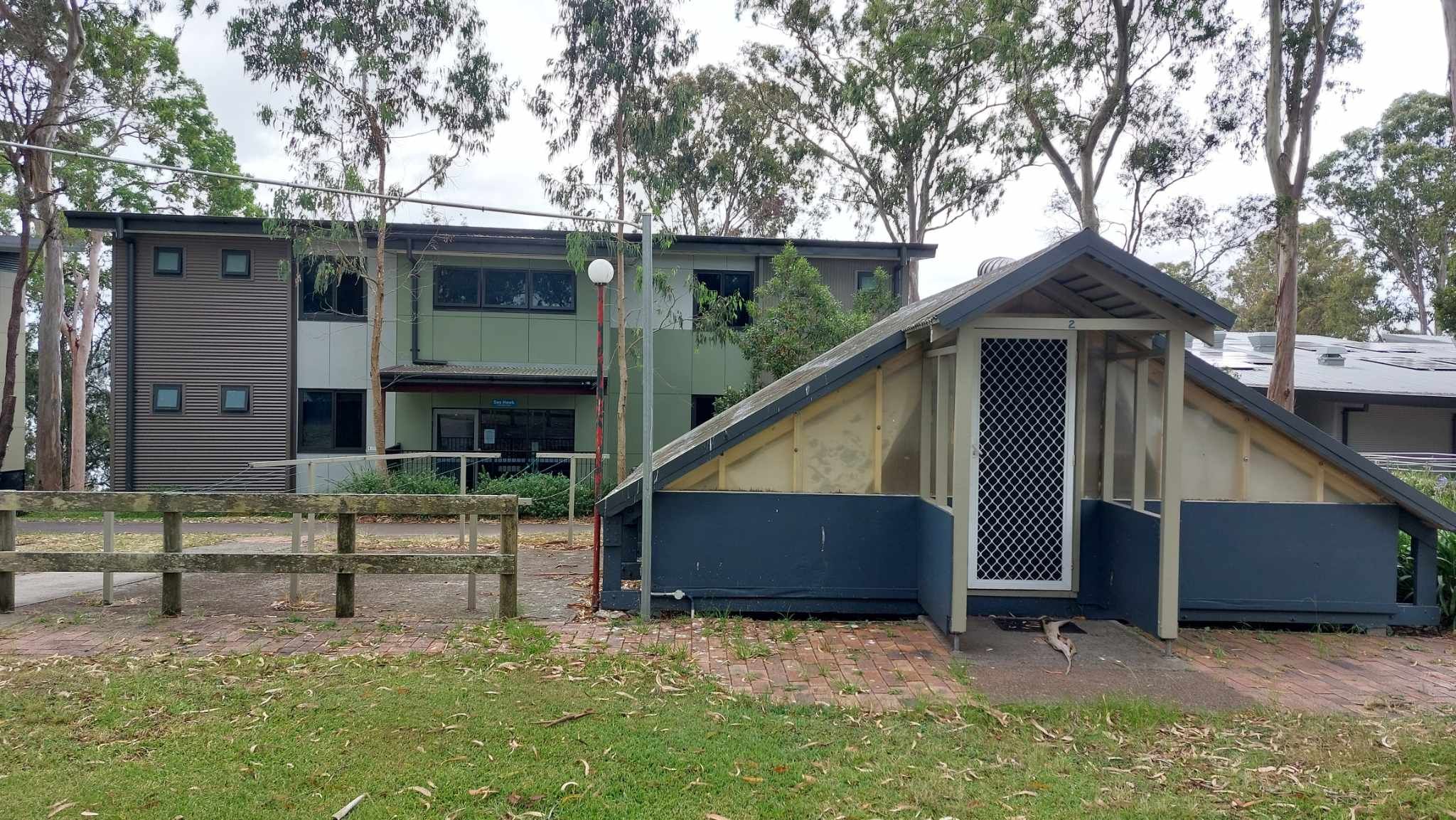
Cabins at CRU Lake Mac. The older 1968 ‘Timber Tent’ cabin is shown in front of one of the 2019 redevelopment cabins.

In 2019, CRU began a $25 million refurbishment of the Lake Macquarie campsite, increasing the capacity of the site from 120 to 380 and constructing two new Climbing Towers. In 2024, a 147 metre long zipline was constructed and was opened by MP Dan Repacholi.

The site hosts school and church camps as well as family groups. As of 2020, the site injected around $620,000 into the local economy every year. In late 2025 the 1968 'Timber Tents' were removed from the site as part of a second redevelopment, they are to be replaced in late 2026 by a 104-bed lodge and meeting room.

=== Galston Gorge ===
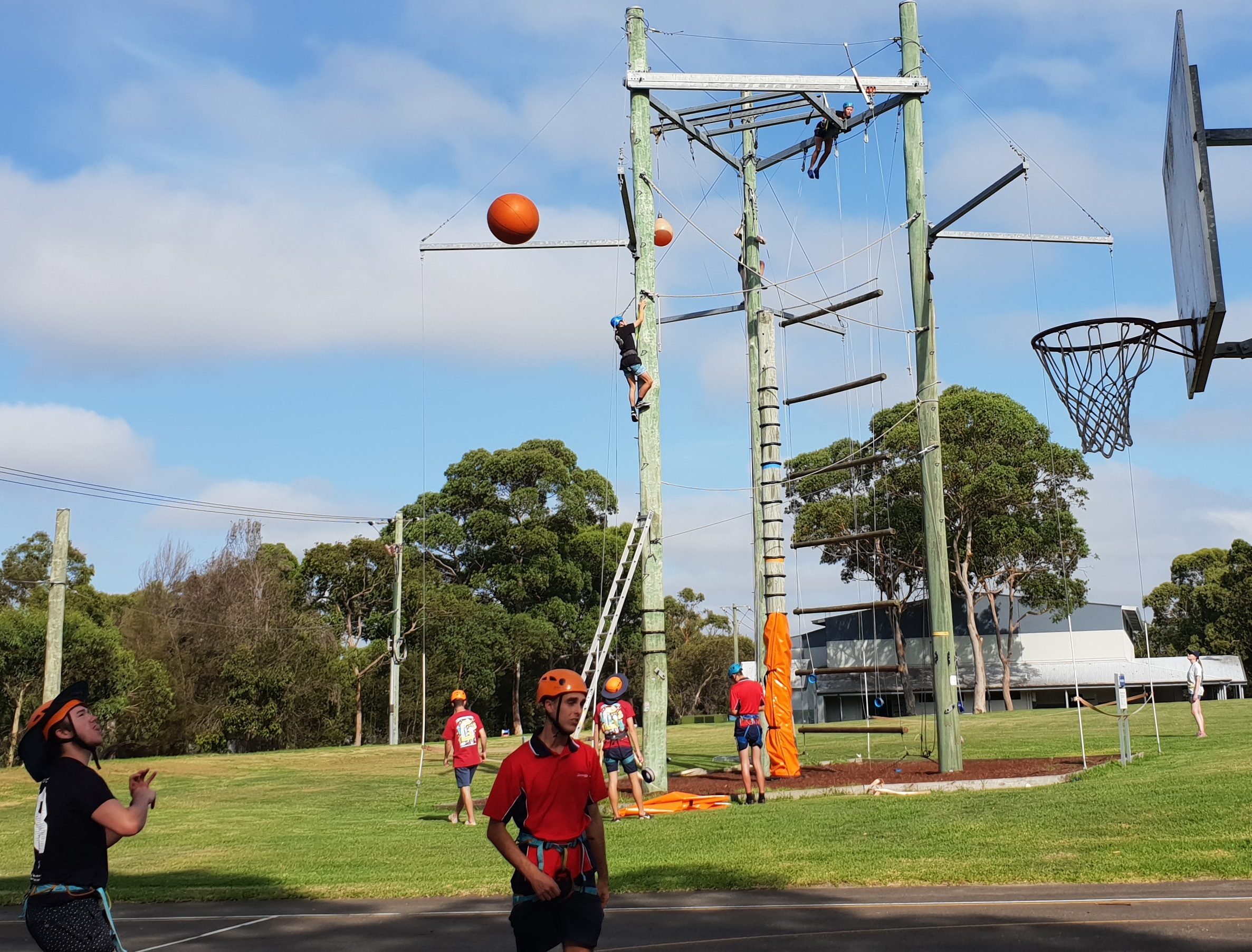
The High Ropes course and Basketball court at CRU Galston Gorge in 2019

In the early 1950s, Paul White mortgaged his home to buy land for the Crusader Union of NSW in Galston for £600. The land at Galston was prepared by 1955, however Cumberland County Council regulations initially prohibited the construction on the site, and so construction of the first two cabins did not start until September 1957. Dining facilities were not completed until 1960, and in that same year ‘Petter’ Cabin was constructed. In June 1966, electricity was provided to the site after the construction of telephone poles and solar system. Water was provided to the site in 1967. By 1970, the site could accommodate 90 people.

In 2000, the site was used by SOCOG to house drivers and staff from the Olympic Roads & Traffic Authority. In 2003, redevelopment begun and the development was completed in 2010. The campsite can host up to 220 people at a time.

=== Colo River ===
The Crusader Union of New South Wales ran canoeing camps along the Colo River until 1968 when the rented site was sold to the Polish Boy Scouts. CRU then purchased their own campsite along the Colo River later in that year, five and a half acres in size with 60m of shoreline. The first camp was held in January 1969, and in mid-1969 the original Lake Macquarie site's kitchen was moved to Colo River. The vast majority of construction on the site was undertaken by a team of volunteers. The Colo River Site was prone to flooding, and eventually the site would be sold in the mid-1980s.

=== Toolangi ===
Boys evacuated from Crusader Union Camp in Toolangi during bushfires in January 1939

The Crusader Union of Victoria owned a 15 acre campsite along Campbell's Creek in Toolangi, Victoria. The site included a mess hall, kitchen, store room, and three sleeping huts.

In 1939, the campsite was affected by bushfires. When fire approached the campsite the campers had been in the swimming pool, and were quickly evacuated by truck.

In 1955, the campsite was transferred to the Scripture Union.

== Schools ministry ==
Six full-time staff and four ministry associates address over 90,000 students in 207 independent schools across NSW and the ACT. There are also Christian groups across Australia using CRU resources.

=== Schools involved ===
- St Andrew's Cathedral School
- Abbotsleigh Infants, Junior and Senior
- Barker College
- Covenant Christian School
- Knox Grammar School
- Loquat Valley Anglican Preparatory School
- Mosman Preparatory School
- Northern Beaches Christian School
- Ravenswood
- Redlands
- Roseville College
- St Luke's Grammar School
- Meriden School
- MLC School
- Northcross Christian School
- Trinity Grammar School Preparatory School
- Arden Anglican School
- Northholm Grammar School
- Norwest Christian College
- Rouse Hill Anglican College
- Tara Anglican School for Girls
- The King's School, Parramatta
- William Clarke College
- St Mark's Anglican Community School
