= John Brew =

Australian businessman

- Born: 19 August 1938 (age 87); Sydney, New South Wales, Australia
- Occupations: Public servant; engineer; educator; administrator
- Awards: Member of the Order of Australia; Australian Defence Medal

John Richard Brew AM (born 19 August 1938) is an Australian public servant, engineer, educator and administrator. He has been recognised for significant contributions to transport as Managing Director of the Urban Transit Authority and Chief Executive of the State Rail Authority and as a consultant at national level. He has also been active in the field of education holding honorary positions in the Anglican school system of NSW and as an academic, and was President of the Baptist Churches of NSW and ACT.

== Early life ==
John Brew was born the eldest son of Lieutenant-Commander Albert Brew RAN and Iris Brew (née Bannister). He was educated initially at Gosford High School and then from 1952 to 1954 at North Sydney Boys High School. Brew was granted a cadetship in civil engineering in the Way and Works Branch of the Department of Railways in 1955 and began studying part time, graduating from the University of New South Wales, with a Bachelor of Civil Engineering in 1963. While studying, Brew enlisted in the Royal Australian Naval Reserve, was active from 1956 to 1962.

== Career in public transport ==
After graduating, Brew held a variety of rural roles as was the norm at the time including District Engineer in Wollongong and then Divisional Engineer in Dubbo and later Parkes. From 1967 he managed the upgrading of the Broken Hill railway line to enable the use of Standard Gauge between Sydney and Perth, opened by Prime Minister John Gorton, 29 November 1969. In the mid 1970s as Manager Projects and Research, Brew contributed to the introduction of continuous loading balloon loops at Bullock Island export coal terminal in Newcastle, an innovation which was then also adopted at mines in the Hunter Valley and Western coal fields.

In 1977, Brew was the Project Manager to put together the Royal Silver Jubilee Train, a touring museum that travelled through Australia to mark the 25th anniversary of Queen Elizabeth's accession. In the same year, he was Technical Adviser to the QC who represented the Public Transport Commission at the enquiry into the Granville rail disaster.

He was appointed as the managing director of the Urban Transit Authority of NSW, the agency responsible for operating government buses and ferries, serving from 1988 to 1992. His time was marked by structural reform and reform in financing achieving considerable success in commercial efficiency. He also introduced gas-powered buses, the first bus-only lanes in NSW, magnetic ticketing and the first RiverCat and JetCat ferries.

He advocated to have NSW join the International Association of Public Transport and to have its 50th World Congress held in Sydney in 1993. When its Asia-Pacific Branch was established, Brew was elected the first Chairman and served from 1990 to 1996. He was also elected Chairman of Australian chapter of the Chartered Instituted of Transport in 1994.

Appointed chief executive of the State Rail Authority of NSW, serving from 1992 to 1995, Brew initiated and carried through some of the landmark reform of industrial relations for which the Fahey Govt is renowned. During his term he sought to make the SRA a more commercially oriented organisation, initiating the building the Sydney Airport Rail Link, the Southern Railway and improving the profitability of the export coal business. On his appointment he was praised by the then Transport Minister for having initiated the design of the Tangara trains and for being instrumental in revitalising country rail travel by commissioning the first XPTs. Brew has been called the last "commissioner" of the railways.

In 1996, then Commonwealth Minister for Transport and Regional Development, the Hon. John Sharp appointed Brew to review and report on the financial performance of Australian National Railways Commission and its relationship with National Rail Corporation, and to make proposals for the strategic reform of both organisations.

Brew continues to make occasional contributions to public discussion on matters of public transport reform in NSW.

== Career in education ==
Brew was appointed Board member from 1996 and then from 1999 Deputy Chairman of the Sydney Anglican Schools Corporation, serving until 2000.

He was Chairman of the Board of St Luke's Grammar School, Dee Why, 1996-2000, and a Member of Council of the Nowra Anglican College, 2001-2003.

Brew established the Wollondilly Anglican College at Tahmoor in 2003, and became Chairman of its governing council, guiding the school through significant growth in its first seven years, to 700 pupils.

Brew graduated with a Bachelor of Ministry from the University of Divinity on 19 May 2024.

== Other community roles ==
In 2011, Brew was elected to the honorary position of President of the Baptist Churches of NSW and ACT by the Baptist Assembly (akin to the Anglican Synod). He presided over a significant structural review of the federation of over 300 Baptist Churches and had oversight of the adoption and implementation of the recommendations of the review with particular emphasis on the pastoral care of people and pastors.

Brew has a lifetime history of active involvement in serving local Baptist congregations as a leader. He was elected Secretary of French's Forest Baptist Church, 1976-1990 and later secretary of the Bowral Baptist Church, 2005-2011 and 2013-2014. In the latter role Brew was the driving force behind having a new church building designed, funded and built.

Brew also served on the Wingecarribee Shire Council Transport Committee from 2002 to 2008.

== Personal life ==
In 1962 Brew married Sylvia Dart (1942-2017) with whom he had five children. They remained married 55 years.

In 2021, Brew married Kate Crowle (née Higgins, 1942-2022).

Brew is a talented maker of ship models and accomplished painter of oil paintings principally with a nautical theme. He has published a history of his family, and particularly their nautical connections with Stockton, New South Wales, the result of a life-long interest in family history. He has also published an autobiography with extensive history of his Brew ancestors.

== Honours and awards ==
In recognition of his significant service to the rail transport and logistics industry, and to education, John Brew was awarded a Member of the Order of Australia, General Division, in the Queen's Birthday 2020 Honours List.

Member of the Order of Australia (AM)
Australian Defence Medal

Government offices
Preceded by Kel Edgar	Managing Director of the Urban Transit Authority; 1988 – 1992	Succeeded by Len Harper as Managing Director of the State Transit Authority
Preceded by Ross Sayers	Chief Executive of the State Rail Authority; 1992 – 1995	Succeeded by Gordon Messiter
