= Georges River Grammar =

Location
- Georges Hall, south-western Sydney, New South Wales; Australia; 33°54′50″S 150°58′57″E

Information
- Former name: St Paul's Choir School; Bankstown Grammar School
- Type: Independent co-educational primary and secondary day school
- Motto: Latin: Exultate Deo (Exalt greatly in God)
- Denomination: Anglicanism
- Established: 1984; 42 years ago (as St Paul's Choir School)
- Educational authority: New South Wales Education Standards Authority
- Oversight: Sydney Anglican Schools Corporation
- Chairman: David McGregor
- Principal: Benjamen Haeusler
- Employees: 100
- Years: K–12
- Enrolment: 880 (2017)
- Colours: Blue and white
- Slogan: Community, sacrifice, service and compassion.
- Affiliation: Sydney Anglican Schools Ministry Association
- Website: grg.nsw.edu.au

The Georges River Grammar (abbreviated as GRG) is an independent Anglican co-educational primary and secondary day school, located in Georges Hall, a south-western suburb of Sydney, New South Wales, Australia. The school was established in 1984, as a non-selective school and currently caters for approximately 880 students from Kindergarten to Year 12.

== History ==
Georges River Grammar was founded in 1984, initially as a primary school based at St Paul's Anglican Church in Bankstown. In 1986, a secondary school, Bankstown Grammar School was commenced as a joint venture of the Anglican and Uniting churches in Bankstown. In 1988, the Uniting Church withdrew from the partnership and the Bankstown Grammar School became an independent, coeducational, Anglican school. The name of the school was officially changed in early 2011 from Bankstown Grammar School to Georges River Grammar to reflect the reality that it draws broadly from the Georges River area, and that the school had outgrown its local name and drawing area of Bankstown. It also reflected a unified identity after the amalgamation of St Paul's Choir School and Bankstown Grammar School in 2004.

According to researchers, the school's outgrowing of its local area is a pattern common with religious and other independent schools in Australia, as growing enrolment in Australian non-government schools confirm that parental desire to provide the ‘best’ schooling for their children will often override factors such as the school location.

The school currently has four houses – Wood, Jackson, Rossiter and Chamberlain – named for the founders of the school. Previously, it had six – Wood, Jackson, Rossiter, Chamberlain, Broughton and Barker.

In the mid-1990s, the school participated in a psychological research study conducted on the topic of self-concept. 395 students participated in the research.

In 2009, the school campaigned to discourage unhealthy food and drinks, banning a number of items from school lunch boxes, and hiring a dietician to speak to parents.

== Notable alumni ==
- Avani Dias, ABC journalist

== Affiliation ==
The school is a member of the Sydney Anglican Schools Ministry Association.

== See also ==
- List of Anglican schools in New South Wales
- Anglican education in Australia
