= Emmanuel Anglican College =

Location
- Ballina, Northern Rivers, New South Wales; Australia; 28°51′44″S 153°31′49″E

Information
- Type: Independent co-educational primary and secondary day school
- Motto: God With Us
- Denomination: Anglicanism
- Established: 1998; 28 years ago
- Educational authority: New South Wales Department of Education
- Principal: Robert Tobias
- Years: K–12
- Enrolment: Over 900. (2024)
- Area: 6 hectares (15 acres)
- Campus type: Regional
- Colours: Navy, gold, maroon, and teal
- Website: www.eac.nsw.edu.au

Emmanuel Anglican College is an independent Anglicanism co-educational primary and secondary day school, located at Ballina in the Northern Rivers region of New South Wales, Australia. Established in 1998, the college provides education for students from Pre-Kindergarten to Year 12. The current principal is Robert Tobias.

== History ==
Emmanuel Anglican College was created as an Anglican College within the Anglican Diocese of Grafton. It is part of the network of Anglican Colleges within the Diocese including Lindisfarne Anglican Grammar School, Clarence Valley Anglican School, Bishop Druitt College, and St Columba Anglican School.

The college was established with 16 students in 1998, and since that time it has grown rapidly, with enrolments reaching 420 in 2007. Recently, Emmanuel Anglican College has grown further with the enrolment of approximately 100 - 200 students in 2015. In 2024 it now has about 900 students and over 115 staff members.

== College campus ==
Emmanuel Anglican College is situated on approximately six hectares (fifteen acres) in West Ballina. Building on the site commenced in 1999. In 2002, the college opened a new 'state-of-the-art' building with four classrooms and retracting walls, providing accommodation for a 350 student assembly. In 2004, a large 2-storey Science and Technology Centre was constructed. In 2009, a new library was constructed. An all-purpose court has been constructed that accommodates five sports, and a hockey field area forms part of the grounds. In 2017 there were plan to extend the school with another four buildings, most of which have since been completed and are now in full use.

Current specialist facilities include Science, Food Technology, Art and Wood Technics, Drama, a Multi-Purpose Center (including basketball courts, a gym, a dance studio and a performance stage) and a Music Room. The Music Room opens out onto a purpose-built staging area.

Previously, St Mary's Anglican Parish in Ballina provided the church for use on formal chapel occasions. The school's Multi-Purpose Centre (The Lindsay Walker Centre) now acts as the Secondary assembly and chapel service building.

== See also ==
- List of Anglican schools in New South Wales
