= Bishop Tyrrell Anglican College =

Location
- 256 Minmi Road, Fletcher, Newcastle, New South Wales; Australia; 32°52′24″S 151°38′48″E

Information
- Type: Independent co-educational early learning, primary and secondary day school
- Motto: Seize the day
- Religious affiliation: Diocese of Newcastle
- Denomination: Anglicanism
- Established: 1998; 28 years ago
- Founder: Bishop William Tyrrell
- Principal: Penny Curran-Peters
- Head of school: Penny Curran-Peters
- Years: Early learning and K–12
- Enrolment: 770
- Houses: Darcy; Fletcher; Thomas; Currey

Bishop Tyrrell Anglican College (abbreviated as BTAC) is an Independent co-educational school from Preschool to Year 12, owned by Newcastle Anglican located in the Newcastle suburb of Fletcher, New South Wales, Australia.

== See also ==
- List of Anglican schools in New South Wales
- Anglican education in Australia

== Facts ==
- Bishop tyrell anglican college (BTAC) goes from preschool all the way up to year 12
