= John Laurence Lambert =

Australian educator and author

John Laurence Lambert AM
- Born: 2 November 1936; Wilcannia
- Died: 2 December 2014 (aged 78); Warrimoo
- Citizenship: Australian
- Occupation: Educator
- Spouse(s): Janice Stephens (1958–2011); Jennifer Wearn (2012–2014)
- Children: 3

Academic work
- Discipline: History

John Laurence Lambert AM (November 2, 1936 – December 2, 2014) was an Australian educator and author.

== Early life and education ==
John Lambert was born in 1936 at the western New South Wales town of Wilcannia where his father was an Anglican minister with the Bush Church Aid society. As his father moved, he lived in Carlton, Katoomba and Springwood attending school in those areas.

Lambert studied education at the Sydney Teachers' College, achieving both his Bachelor of Arts, and Diploma of Education. He subsequently completed a Master of Education at the University of Sydney in 1980.

== Education career ==
Lambert taught English and history at Sydney Boys High School and St Marys High, where he also became the leader of the local cadet unit and band master. He was appointed English/history master at Cabramatta High School in 1966.

He then advanced from direct teaching roles to a variety of inspector and administrative positions within the New South Wales Department of Education:

- 1971 joined panel of Inspectors of Secondary Schools
- 1980 helped develop 1980 history syllabus
- 1980 seconded to the Advanced Education Board
- 1980 provided advice to Sydney College of Divinity and the Australian College of Theology
- 1981–1982 Staff Inspector of Properties
- 1983–1986 Director Western Region
- 1986 Director Studies Directorate
- 1988 Assistant Director-General
- 1989 Deputy Director-General Program and Planning
- 1990–1994 founding president of NSW Board of Studies

From 1994 to 2010, after leaving the Department of Education, Lambert took up a role with the Sydney Anglican Schools Corporation as schools development officer, leading the site selection, establishment and early years of school growth for a network of low fee, Christian schools in the west and south of Sydney and New South Wales south coast. A task that subsequently established nine new schools, commencing with Penrith Anglican College. His role also assisted in the transition of three other independent schools into the Anglican Schools Corporation, and the planning of several new schools that did not subsequently proceed.

== Personal life ==
Lambert married Janice Stephens in 1958 and lived in Warrimoo in the Blue Mountains. Together they had three children. Janice died in 2011. Lambert subsequently married Jennifer Wearn in 2012.

Throughout his life Lambert was a committed Christian, for many years involved in the Anglican Church at Springwood where he served as lay preacher, warden and parish councillor. Lambert was also a prolific writer of hymns, with 76 of them printed in a compilation, Hymns for the Twenty First Century, prepared after his death by his local church.

== Death ==
Lambert died at home in Warrimoo on 2 December 2014. suffering from lung cancer.

== Biography ==
John Goddard wrote a biography of Lambert entitled To Seek Beyond the Known in 2017.

== Awards ==
He was recognised with the Anniversary of National Service 1951–1972 Medal for his National Service in the early 1950s.

Lambert was awarded a member of the Order of Australia in 2001 for "service to education, particularly in the area of curriculum development frameworks within New South Wales, and to the Sydney Anglican Schools Corporation".

== Published works ==
=== Non fiction ===
- Handbook of Modern History: Book One (1961-1962) – Melbourne : Cheshire
- Handbook of Modern History: Book Two (1966) – Melbourne : Cheshire

=== Hymns ===
- Hymns for the Twenty First Century (2015) – compiled by Patricia Browne

=== Monographs ===
- High School Education and Industry in the United States a Report Compiled Following a Visit to the United States On a Fulbright Scholarship March/April 1988 (1988) – [Sydney]: N.S.W. Dept. of Education
- The Liberal Tradition: Problems With Competencies, Profiles and Vocationalism (1994) - Sydney : Monograph (Australian College of Education. N.S.W. Chapter) No 21

=== Novels ===
- A Land of Plenty (2009) – Zeus, Burleigh Qld, ISBN 978-1-921406-83-6
- Beyond All Seas (2010) – Zeus, Burleigh Qld, ISBN 978-1-921574-97-9
- Arthur: King of the Britons (2011) – Zeus, Burleigh Qld, ISBN 978-1-921919-00-8
- Apocalypse (2013) – Zeus, Burleigh Qld, ISBN 978-1-922229-29-8
- A Promise Kept (2013) – Zeus, Burleigh Qld, ISBN 978-1-922229-38-0
- NSW Australian series
  - Two Tales of the Mountains (2011) – Zeus, Burleigh Qld, ISBN 978-1-921731-89-1
  - Two Tales of the West (2013) – Zeus, Burleigh Qld, ISBN 978-1-922229-23-6
- Weston trilogy
  - Risk and Reward (2012) – Zeus, Burleigh Qld, ISBN 978-1-921919-52-7
  - Lost and Forgotten (2011) – Zeus, Burleigh Qld, ISBN 978-1-921731-70-9
  - Encounter Hall (2011) – Zeus, Burleigh Qld, ISBN 978-1-921731-94-5

=== Short stories ===
- The Lamp and Other Stories (2014) – Zeus, Burleigh Qld, ISBN 978-1-922229-65-6
