= West Hoxton =

- Suburb
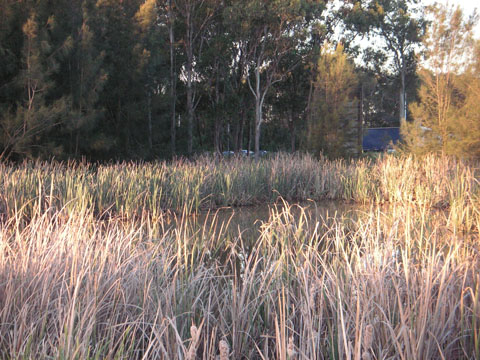
- Lake Francis, West Hoxton

- Interactive map of West Hoxton
- Country: Australia
- State: New South Wales
- City: Sydney
- LGA: City of Liverpool
- Location: 40 km (25 mi) west of Sydney CBD

Government
  - State electorate: Leppington
  - Federal division: Werriwa

Population
  - Total: 10,152 (2021 census)
- Postcode: 2171
Suburbs around West Hoxton
Cecil Park Austral	Middleton Grange	Hinchinbrook
Austral	West Hoxton	Hoxton Park Carnes Hill
Leppington	Leppington Horningsea Park	Horningsea Park Edmondson Park

West Hoxton is a suburb of Sydney, in the state of New South Wales, Australia. West Hoxton is located 40 kilometres west of the Sydney central business district, in the local government area of the City of Liverpool and is part of the Greater Western Sydney region.

== History ==
West Hoxton is an extension of Hoxton Park. Hoxton Park was named in 1887 when Phillips and Co, a syndicate, subdivided the land under that name. Thomas Setrop Amos, a London solicitor, who arrived in Sydney in 1816, was granted 800 acres (3.2 km^{2}) in this area in June 1818.

West Hoxton was primarily developed during the late 1990s as a residential area.

== Schools ==
- Hoxton Park Public School
- Greenway Park Public School
- Thomas Hassall Anglican College
- Clancy Catholic College

== Population ==
In the 2021 census, West Hoxton had a population of 10,152, of which 49.7% were male and 50.3% were female. The median age was 34. The most common ancestries were Australian 14.3%, Italian 13.1%, English 10.3%, Indian 6.6% and Chinese 4.7%. 57.5% of people were born in Australia. The most common other countries of birth were Iraq 6.4%, Fiji 4.5%, Philippines 2.4%, Vietnam 2.1% and New Zealand 1.8%. 46.3% of people only spoke English at home. Other languages spoken at home included Arabic 8.9%, Hindi 4.7%, Spanish 3.4%, Assyrian Neo-Aramaic 3.3% and Vietnamese 3.2%.

The population of West Hoxton increased more than sixfold from 1996 to 2001, to 4,997, as a result of residential development. Between 2001 and 2016, it doubled again.

Since the turn of the 21st century, West Hoxton has boasted a substantial share of its population born overseas, from a wide range of countries, which indicates that this area had a relatively multicultural population. Amongst those who were born overseas, it featured a notably higher percentage of the population born in non-English-speaking countries compared to those born in mainly English-speaking countries. The overseas-born population in West Hoxton includes those from Europe, as well as from more recent arrivals from Asia and the Pacific. West Hoxton has a higher share of the population born in the Philippines, Fiji and Italy compared to the rest of the City of Liverpool.

== Notable residents ==
- Wendy Paramor (1938–1975), painter and sculptor

== Transport ==
West Hoxton lies to the west of Cowpasture Road which provides connection to other roads leading to Liverpool and Camden. Transit Systems operate four bus services routes 851, 852, 853 and 854, running along Cowpastures Road, connecting West Hoxton to Liverpool.
