= Penrith Anglican College =

Location
- 338–356 Wentworth Road, Orchard Hills, Western Sydney, New South Wales; Australia; 33°47′49″S 150°42′27″E

Information
- Type: Independent school co-educational early learning, primary and secondary day school
- Motto: To Serve Christ
- Religious affiliation: Anglican Diocese of Sydney
- Denomination: Anglicanism
- Established: 1998; 28 years ago
- Oversight: Sydney Anglican Schools Corporation
- Chairman: Philip Bell
- Principal: Felicity Grima
- Faculty: 120
- Grades: Early learning and K–12
- Enrolment: 1,350 (2025)
- Colours: Red, white and black
- Website: www.penrith.nsw.edu.au

The Penrith Anglican College is an independent Anglican co-educational early learning, primary and secondary day school, located in Orchard Hills, near Penrith, New South Wales, Australia. The College is a member school of the Sydney Anglican Schools Corporation and caters for approximately 1,000 students from Pre-Kindergarten to Year 12.

== History ==
In 1994, John Lambert, the NSW Assistant Director General of Education, recognised a need in the rapidly growing Penrith area, for a Christian school and felt the Anglican Church could fill this gap. After being appointed Director of Schools in the Sydney Anglican Schools Corporation, land was purchased in Orchard Hills and construction continued over the next 4 years before the school opened in 1998 with 137 students.

Since opening, the school has expanded in student capacity and facilities. A performing arts theatre, named the Lighthouse Theatre was opened on August 19, 2011.

== See also ==
- List of Anglican schools in New South Wales
- Anglican education in Australia
