= Lakes Grammar =

Location
- Warnervale, New South Wales; Australia; 33°14′35″S 151°26′38″E

Information
- Other name: Lakes Anglican Grammar School
- Type: Independent co-educational primary and secondary day school
- Motto: With heart, soul, mind, and strength
- Denomination: Anglicanism
- Established: 2004; 22 years ago
- Principal: Richard Wheeldon
- Years: K–12
- Enrolment: ~940 (2017)
- Colours: Navy blue, red and gold
- Affiliations: Junior School Heads Association of Australia; Independent Schools Association
- Website: www.lakes.nsw.edu.au

Lakes Grammar is an independent Anglican co-educational primary and secondary day school, located at the northern end of the Central Coast in the suburb of Warnervale, New South Wales, Australia. The school has two distinct spaces; a Junior School for students from Kindergarten to Year 6; and Senior School for students from Year 7 to Year 12.

Lakes Grammar is accredited according to the standards of Kids Matter, an Australian mental health and well-being framework.

== History ==
The school was established in 2004 with Michael Hannah as the Principal.

In 2021, principal Michael Hannah retired, this would be the first time that the principal of Lakes Grammar would be changed.The principal was Deborah Clancy from 2021-2024.

== See also ==
- List of Anglican schools in New South Wales
- Anglican education in Australia
