= The Riverina Anglican College =

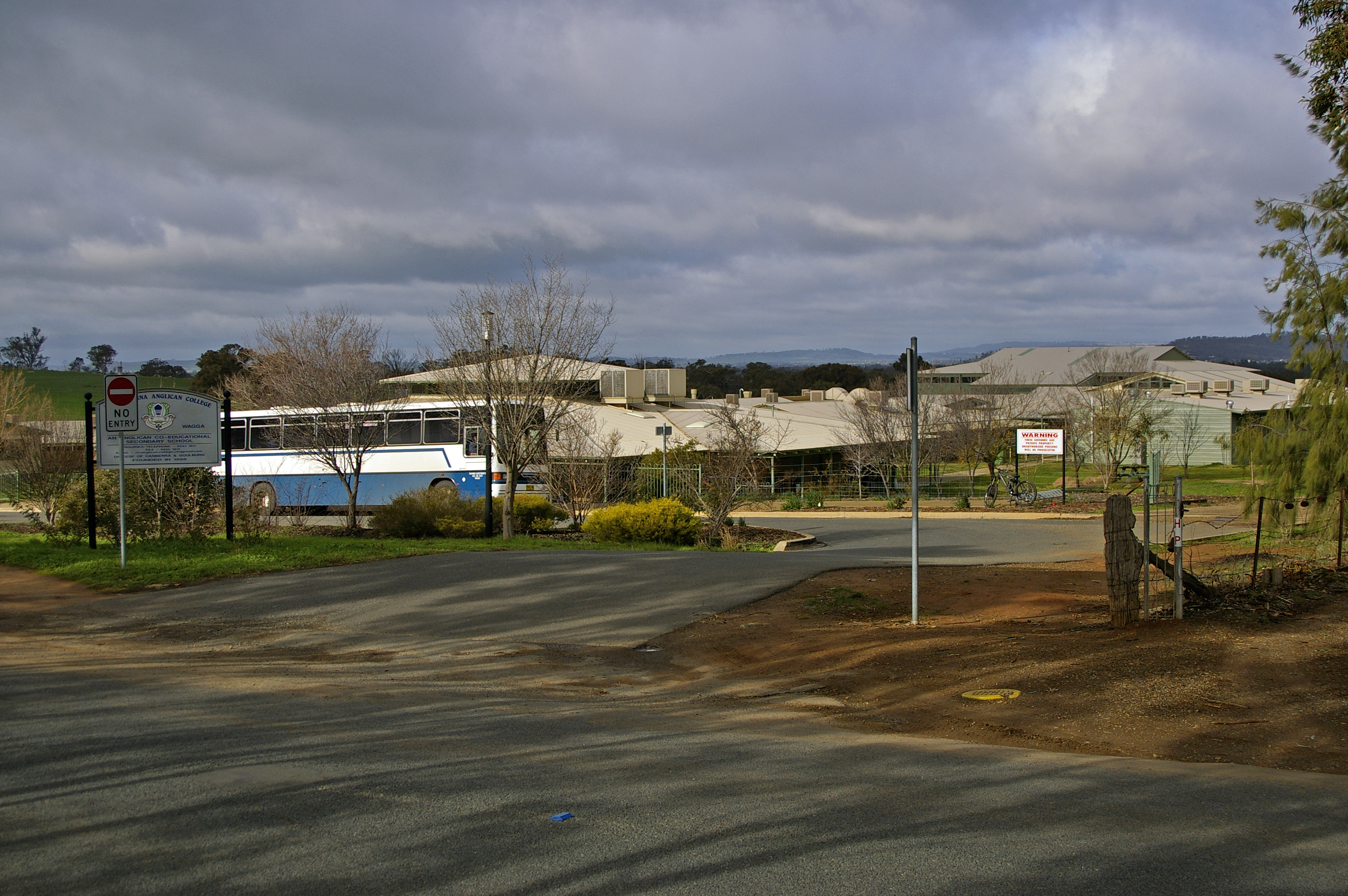

Location
- Wagga Wagga, New South Wales; Australia; 35°04′03″S 147°21′51″E

Information
- Type: Independent co-educational secondary and primary day school
- Motto: Strength through Faith and Knowledge
- Religious affiliation: Anglican Diocese of Canberra
- Denomination: Anglicanism
- Established: January 1999; 27 years ago
- Educational authority: New South Wales Department of Education
- Principal: Craig Mansour
- Years: Prep to Year 12
- Enrolment: c. 1000 (2025)
- Area: 14 hectares (35 acres)
- Campus type: Regional
- Colours: Green, white, orange and navy blue
- Website: www.trac.nsw.edu.au

The Riverina Anglican College is an independent Anglican co-educational secondary day school, located in Wagga Wagga, in the Riverina region of New South Wales, Australia. Established in January 1999, the College is located on Farrer Road in Boorooma, adjacent to the Charles Sturt University Wagga campus.

== Principals ==
The following individuals served as Principal of the Riverina Anglican College:

Ordinal	Officeholder	Term start	Term end	Time in office	Notes
1	Ian Grant	1999	2016	16–17 years	
2	Paul Humble	2017	2021	3–4 years	
3	Geoff Marsh	2022	2023	2 years	
3	Craig Mansour	2024			

== Facilities ==
The Riverina Anglican College has various facilities, including but not limited to: full design and technology workshop facilities, a gymnasium, an extensive library, a music and drama building and a HSIE building finished in 2026, as well as a farm for cultivating livestock suitable for auctioning.

== Famous alumni ==
- Harvey Thomas - AFL player for the Greater Western Sydney Giants, debuted in 2024 and received an AFL Rising Star nomination that year.
- Harry Perryman - AFL player for the Collingwood Magpies, graduated in 2016.
- Dougal Howard - AFL player for Port Adelaide

== See also ==
- List of Anglican schools in New South Wales
- Anglican education in Australia
