= Richard Johnson Anglican College =

Location
- Western Sydney, New South Wales; Australia; 33°44′35″S 150°50′06″E

Information
- Type: Independent co-educational early learning, primary and secondary day school
- Denomination: Anglicanism
- Established: 1997; 29 years ago
- Educational authority: New South Wales Education Standards Authority
- Oversight: Sydney Anglican Schools Corporation
- Principal: Alan Dawson
- Years: Early learning and K–12
- Enrolment: 1000+
- Campuses: Oakhurst; Marsden Park
- Campus type: Suburban
- Colours: Blue and white
- Newspaper: RJ Review Newsletter
- Website: www.rjas.nsw.edu.au

Richard Johnson Anglican College is an independent Anglican co-educational primary and secondary day school, located in western Sydney, New South Wales, Australia. Founded in 1997, the college provides a religious and general education to over 1020 students from Kindergarten to Year 12 at Oakhurst.

Oversight of the college is administered by the Sydney Anglican Schools Corporation and the college is affiliated with the Diocese of Sydney. The college is named after Rev Richard Johnson, the first clergyman in Australia.

In 2020, founding Principal Paul Cockrem retired. He was succeeded by Deputy Principal Alan Dawson.

== See also ==
- List of Anglican schools in New South Wales
- Anglican education in Australia
