= St Andrew's School (Adelaide) =

Location
- 22 Smith Street; Walkerville, South Australia; Australia; 34°53′34″S 138°36′51″E

Information
- Former name: St Andrew's Day School
- Type: Independent, co-educational, day primary school
- Motto: Nisi Dominus Frustra (Except the Lord build the house, their labour is lost that build it)
- Religious affiliation: Anglican
- Established: 23 September 1850; 175 years ago
- School code: 002013 (IB)
- Chairperson: Peta St Clair
- Principal: Luke Ritchie
- Teaching staff: 35.1 FTE
- Years offered: Reception–Year 6
- Gender: Co-educational
- Enrolment: 376 (2025)
- Language: English
- Campus: Eastern and Western campuses
- Houses: Browne, Eggleton, Lawson and Smith
- Colours: Navy blue and white
- Accreditation: International Baccalaureate Primary Years Programme
- Affiliation: Sports Association for Adelaide Schools
- Website: standrews.sa.edu.au

St Andrew's School is an independent, co-educational, Anglican early learning and primary school in Walkerville, an inner north-eastern suburb of Adelaide, South Australia. Established in 1850, it is one of the oldest independent schools in South Australia. The Walkerville Heritage Survey describes St Andrew's as the third-oldest independent school in the state.

The school provides education from an Early Learning Centre, which accepts children from the age of three, through to Year 6. Its formal school enrolment from Reception to Year 6 was 376 students in 2025.

St Andrew's is an International Baccalaureate (IB) World School offering the Primary Years Programme (PYP). The IB lists the school as a private, co-educational day school with English as its language of instruction.

== History ==
=== Foundation and early years ===
St Andrew's School developed in association with St Andrew's Church during the early settlement of Walkerville. According to the Walkerville Heritage Survey, church benefactors William Williams, a brewer, and G. W. Hawkes proposed the establishment of a school to a meeting of parishioners in 1848.

St Andrew's Day School opened in September 1850. The heritage survey records that it was established to educate children of the "labouring class", and compares its original purpose with that of Adelaide's early Pulteney Street School. The school records its opening date as 23 September 1850.

The first schoolroom measured approximately 6 by 12 m (20 by 39 ft). The original sandstone school building survives at 22 Smith Street and has subsequently been incorporated into the school's Gymnasium and Performing Arts Centre.

The original school building is recognised as a local heritage place. The Walkerville Heritage Survey describes it as a significant example of early private-school educational facilities in South Australia and states that it reflects the historical importance of church and school activities in the development of the local community.

=== Nineteenth and early twentieth centuries ===
Archdeacon George Dove became rector of St Andrew's Church in 1862 and remained in the position for 49 years. He and his wife Caroline were long-standing supporters of the school. Dove Hall, opened on 4 December 1915, was named in his memory.

Lavinia Porter served as principal from 1893 until 1923. The school's historical records credit Porter with establishing the school library, designing an early school badge and organising an Old Scholars' reunion. An extension completed in 1901 included the Priscilla Barker Room, named for a school fundraiser.

A parish hall was constructed around 1930 and was initially used for church activities. It was later leased for school use before being purchased by the St Andrew's School Foundation in 1993.

During the years following the Great Depression, declining enrolments placed the school at risk of closure. The school's history credits teacher Elizabeth Browne with helping to maintain the school during this period.

Cecil Eggleton became rector of St Andrew's Church in 1944. A kindergarten building opened in 1952, with former student and teacher Poppy Lawson as its head.

=== Houses ===
The school's first two houses, Browne and Lawson, were created in 1959 and named for Elizabeth Browne and Poppy Lawson. Eggleton House was added in 1966 in honour of Cecil Eggleton.

The fourth house, Smith, was created in 1985 and named for teacher Peter Smith, who had twice served as acting head of the school. The four houses continue to compete in school sporting events, including cross-country, swimming and athletics competitions.

=== Campus expansion ===
The school expanded substantially during the late twentieth and early twenty-first centuries. The Rayner Building was dedicated in 1989, and the Habich Building opened in 1990 following a bequest to the school by Hazel Habich.

In 1996, a pedestrian bridge was opened over Smith Street, connecting the eastern and western sections of the school campus.

An Early Learning Centre opened in 2005. In 2010, marking the school's 160th anniversary, the Gymnasium and Performing Arts Centre was opened. The development incorporated the original 1850 schoolroom.

The Habich Early Learning Centre opened in 2017 following refurbishment of the Habich Building.

=== Tarrkarri ===
The Tarrkarri Building opened in 2022. It contains administration facilities, Year 6 learning areas and a two-storey science and engineering learning space known as the Collaboratory. The name Tarrkarri means "the future" in the Kaurna language.

Adelaide architectural practice Swanbury Penglase was engaged in 2019 to design the project as part of the school's master plan. Construction was completed in early 2022.

Tarrkarri received a commendation for Educational Architecture at the 2023 South Australian Architecture Awards. It also received a South Australia and Northern Territory Chapter commendation from Learning Environments Australasia in 2022.

=== 175th anniversary ===
St Andrew's celebrated the 175th anniversary of its foundation in 2025. As part of its anniversary period, the school announced a 2025–2030 campus master plan. Planned projects included internal upgrades to the School Hall, expansion of the Early Learning Centre and the addition of another Year 6 classroom in the Tarrkarri Building.

== Campus ==
St Andrew's is located at 22 Smith Street, Walkerville. The school occupies eastern and western campuses on opposite sides of Smith Street, connected by the pedestrian bridge constructed in 1996.

The Early Learning Centre, Reception, Year 1 and Year 6 are situated on the Eastern Campus, while Years 2 to 5 are located on the Western Campus.

The campus combines heritage buildings with later educational facilities. The original 1850 schoolroom survives within the Gymnasium and Performing Arts Centre. Other facilities include tennis courts, a gymnasium, performing arts facilities, a library, the Tarrkarri Building and its Collaboratory, and outdoor learning and play areas.

The original school building forms part of Walkerville's local heritage. Other buildings historically associated with St Andrew's and its parish have also been identified in local heritage studies.

== Curriculum ==
St Andrew's is an International Baccalaureate World School. It became an IB school on 26 November 1996, and its Primary Years Programme was authorised on 18 October 1999.

The school delivers the IB Primary Years Programme in conjunction with the Australian Curriculum. Specialist curriculum areas include music, science, technology, engineering, mathematics, visual arts, languages and physical education.

Mandarin Chinese is taught as part of the school's language curriculum.

As an Anglican school, St Andrew's incorporates religious inquiry and Christian observances into its curriculum. The school states that it also teaches about or recognises religious observances represented by other faiths within its community.

=== Early Learning Centre ===
The Early Learning Centre is registered to enrol children from the age of three. Its educational programme draws on the Reggio Emilia approach, the Australian Early Years Learning Framework and the IB Primary Years Programme.

The Early Learning Centre is administratively part of the broader St Andrew's community but is not included in the Reception–Year 6 enrolment reported for the school by My School.

== Enrolment and school community ==
According to the Australian Curriculum, Assessment and Reporting Authority (ACARA) through its My School data, St Andrew's had 376 students from Reception to Year 6 in 2025. The enrolment comprised 195 boys and 181 girls.

The school had 39 teaching staff, equivalent to 35.1 full-time positions, and 60 non-teaching staff, equivalent to 32.7 full-time positions.

In the same data, 66 per cent of students were recorded as having a language background other than English and one per cent as Aboriginal or Torres Strait Islander.

The school's Index of Community Socio-Educational Advantage (ICSEA) was 1,191 in 2025. ACARA uses ICSEA as a measure of the socio-educational backgrounds of students at a school, with an Australian average set at 1,000.

The school's website separately states that more than 530 children are enrolled when the Early Learning Centre is included.

== Music ==
Music is taught by specialist staff from the Early Learning Centre through to Year 6.

The classroom programme includes a recorder programme for Year 2 students, strings for Year 3 and introductory woodwind and brass opportunities in Year 4.

The school's ensemble programme includes string orchestras, concert bands, smaller instrumental ensembles, handbell ringing and choirs.

Performance events include school concerts, band and string performances, recitals and the school's annual Speech Night.

== Sport and extra-curricular activities ==
Physical education is part of the curriculum, with students also participating in sporting events, outdoor education, camps and study tours. The campus includes a school oval, tennis courts and a purpose-built gymnasium.

School sporting events include cross-country, swimming and athletics competitions, in which students compete for their houses.

St Andrew's also offers a range of extra-curricular activities. As of 2026 these included art, chess, classical dance, debating, tennis, gymnastics, mechatronics, media activities, multisports, Tournament of Minds and the Oliphant Science Awards.

The school also participates in interschool sport and representative school sport programmes.

== Governance ==
St Andrew's operates as an independent Anglican school. St Andrew's School Inc is the legal institution associated with the school.

As of 2026, Luke Ritchie is the school's principal. The International Baccalaureate also identifies Ritchie as head of school.

Peta St Clair is chairperson of the School Board.

The school retains an Anglican identity and describes its educational approach as based on Christian values.

== See also ==
- List of schools in South Australia
- List of International Baccalaureate schools in Australia
- Anglican education in Australia
- Sports Association for Adelaide Schools
