= Danebank =

Location
- Hurstville, New South Wales; Australia
- Coordinates: 33°57′44″S 151°06′09″E

Information
- Other names: Danebank An Anglican School for Girls
- Type: Independent early learning, primary and secondary day school
- Motto: Latin: Ut Prosim (That I May Serve)
- Denomination: Anglican
- Established: 1933; 93 years ago
- Founder: Edith Roseby Ball
- Oversight: Sydney Anglican Schools Corporation
- Chair: Dr Mark Daly
- Principal: Dr Michelle Benn
- Chaplain: Kellie Thomson
- Staff: 159.9 FTE (2025)
- Teaching staff: 106.8 FTE (2025)
- Years: Early learning and K–12
- Gender: Girls
- Enrolment: 1043 (2025)
- Colours: Green and pink
- Affiliations: Independent Primary School Heads of Australia; Junior School Heads Association of Australia; Alliance of Girls' Schools Australasia; Association of Heads of Independent Girls' Schools
- Website: www.danebank.nsw.edu.au

Danebank, officially Danebank An Anglican School for Girls, is an independent Anglican early learning, primary and secondary day school for girls, located in Hurstville, a southern suburb of Sydney, Australia. It is a member school of the Anglican Schools Corporation.

Established in 1933 by Edith Roseby Ball, Danebank has a non-selective enrolment policy and as of 2025, it caters for 1043 students from Preschool to Year 12.

The school is affiliated with the Independent Primary School Heads of Australia (IPSHA), the Junior School Heads Association of Australia (JSHAA), the Alliance of Girls' Schools Australasia (AGSA), and the Association of Heads of Independent Girls' Schools (AHIGS).

== History ==
Danebank was established in 1933 on its current site in Hurstville, by Edith Roseby Ball. The school was established as a small co-educational Kindergarten with just five students.

On 29 October 2018 the then Principal, Mrs Maryanne Davis, co-signed an open letter to the Australian members of parliament supporting the rights of faith-based schools to discriminate against staff who do not share the religious beliefs of faith-based schools.

== Principals ==
Ordinal	Officeholder	Term start	Term end	Time in office	Notes
1	Edith Roseby Ball	1933	1950	16–17 years	
2	Olga Wilson	1951	1953	1–2 years	
3	Joyce Cowell	1952	1974	21–22 years	
4	Carole Tisdell	1975	1987	11–12 years	
5	Rosalyn Bird	1988	2009	20–21 years	
6	Maryanne Davis	2010	2019	10 years	
7	Dr Emma Burgess	2020	2025	5 years	
7	Dr Michele Benn	2025	present		

== Facilities ==
Note: Construction and demolition is currently ongoing in Danebank and new facilities will be constructed. The Langdon Wing is being partly demolished for newer facilities. Danebank's current facilities include:

- The first stage of the Danebank masterplan for redevelopment was officially opened in May 2018. It houses a Pre-Kindergarten Centre and classrooms for Kindergarten to Year 2 students, as well as specialist music, technology and extension class rooms for Junior School.
- The Pre-Kindergarten Centre is part of the new Junior School Building. It has a large classroom, break-out areas where equipment serves different learning needs, outdoor play areas, Little-one's toilet area and staff facilities.
- The Gymnasium: opened in 2006. Holds a gymnastics area, court, upstairs dance studio, classroom, staffroom, storerooms, changerooms and contains equipment for sporting activities.
- The Terraces: contains equipment and facilities for Design and technology, visual arts, hospitality, visual design, industrial technology multi-media and computing. New facilities for Drama and Music have now been added including a drama space, drama room, music foyer and music classroom.
- K–12 Resources Centre: contains the JC Cowell Library, the Careers Reference Area, AudioVisual Control Room and the Independent Learning Centre.
- Wingara Senior Studies Centre: study rooms, geography and history classrooms, common room, conference room, and kitchen, for Year 12.
- Roseby Ball House: "The Quad" – a three-storey building designed around a central courtyard. For administration, classroom teaching, science laboratories, mathematics laboratory, staff rooms. Currently has no electricity in certain areas due to an overloaded power grid, and when it will be expanded is uncertain.
- The Aquatic Centre: consists of the Aquatic Centre plus a multi purpose court. The indoor Aquatic Centre contains a 25-metre water polo pool plus a beginners pool. Other sporting facilities include a mini gymnasium and multi purpose court.
- The Performing Arts Centre: Also commonly known as the PAC, consists of a main stage with seating for 1,000+ people including a gallery level, large music and drama classrooms and storeroom, and 10 individual music practice rooms for individual student tutorials and class groups.

== Notable alumnae ==
- Dr. Kerry Chant – NSW Chief Health Officer
- Ash Ambihaipahar – current Labor federal member for Barton
- Nicole Harris – paralympian
- Alex Lee – comedian
- Lilie James - Waterpolo coached that was murdered

== See also ==
- List of Anglican schools in New South Wales
- List of non-government schools in New South Wales
