= Thomas Hassall Anglican College =

- The administration block of the College

Location
- Middleton Grange, south-western Sydney, New South Wales; Australia; 33°55′05″S 150°50′25″E

Information
- Type: Independent co-educational early learning, primary, and secondary day school
- Motto: A more excellent way
- Denomination: Anglicanism
- Established: 2000; 26 years ago
- Educational authority: New South Wales Education Standards Authority
- Oversight: Sydney Anglican Schools Corporation
- Principal: Karen Easton
- Deputy Principal & Head of Senior School: David Butler
- Deputy Principal & Head of Junior School: Sandy Wheeler
- Years: Early learning and K–12
- Enrolment: 1,850 (February 2025)
- Campus: 13 hectares (31 acres)
- Website: www.thac.nsw.edu.au

Thomas Hassall Anglican College is an independent Anglican co-educational day school located in Middleton Grange, a south-western suburb of Sydney, New South Wales, Australia. Established in 2000 by the Sydney Anglican Schools Corporation, the College provides education from early learning through Prep to Year 12. As of 2025, it serves approximately 1,850 students.

== Foundation ==
S Block of the College

The College was founded in late 1999 by the Sydney Anglican Schools Corporation. Rapid growth in the area demanded the need for a new independent school, with nearest independent schools including Macarthur Anglican School, Freeman Catholic College and Good Samaritan Catholic College.

The school began operation on its current Middleton Grange campus in 2000. Initially the school operated Kindergarten to Year 6 classes, with an additional year being added each calendar year, until 2006 when both early learning and Year 12 began operation.

== Principals ==
The following individuals have served as principals (headmasters) of Thomas Hassall Anglican College:

| Ordinal | Officeholder | Term start | Term end | Time in office | Notes |
|---|---|---|---|---|---|
| 1 | Brian Cowling | 2000 | 2007 | 7 years | |
| 2 | Ross Whelan | 2007 | 2023 | 16 years | Longest serving headmaster of the school |
| 3 | Karen Easton | 2023 | present | present | |

== The school crest and motto ==
The school crest, worn by students on the front of the blazer, male students' shirts, and student sports uniforms is based on the cross schools motto: "A More Excellent Way".

== See also ==
- List of Anglican schools in New South Wales
- Anglican education in Australia
