= Terranora, New South Wales =

Town in New South Wales, Australia

Terranora
- Town
- Coordinates: 28°14′25″S 153°30′6″E
- Country: Australia
- State: New South Wales
- LGA: Tweed Shire

Government
  - State electorate: Tweed
  - Federal division: Richmond
- Elevation: 115 m (377 ft)

Population
  - Total: 3,365 (2021 census)
- Postcode: 2486
- County: Rous

Terranora is a town in the Northern Rivers region of New South Wales, Australia. It is a part of the Tweed Shire local Government area and it is a suburb of Tweed Heads.

There are two schools: Terranora Public School and the senior campus of Lindisfarne Anglican Grammar School.

At the 2021 census, Terranora had a population of 3,365 people.

The Ngandowal and Minyungbal speaking people of the Bundjalung people are the traditional owners of Terranora and the surrounding areas.

== Origin of place name ==
Early European arrivals to the area, mostly cedar-getters, called the area Taranora and it was first colonised by them in the 1850s.

Taranora and the "modern" Terranora are believed to have been derived from a Bundjalung language word meaning 'small river' or 'small estuary'.

== Demographics ==
At the 2021 census, Terranora recorded a population of 3,365 people, 49.4% male and 50.6% female.

The median age was 42, 4 years above the national median of 38.

82.3% of people living in Terranora were born in Australia. The other top responses for country of birth were England 4.0%, New Zealand 2.4%, India 0.6%, South Africa 0.4%, and Philippines 0.4%.

91.8% of people spoke only English at home; the next most common languages were 0.3% German, 0.3% Russian, 0.3% Malayalam, 0.3% Punjabi, and 0.3% Thai.

== Notable people ==
- Comedian and actor Celeste Barber grew up in Terranora.
- Children's author, Hesba Fay Brinsmead, made her home in Terranora from 1976 until the early 2000s.
