= Wollondilly Anglican College =

Location
- Tahmoor, Southern Highlands, New South Wales; Australia; 34°15′06″S 150°34′03″E

Information
- Type: Independent co-educational early learning, primary, and secondary day school
- Motto: For Christ's Glory
- Religious affiliation: Anglican Diocese of Sydney
- Denomination: Anglicanism
- Established: 2004; 22 years ago
- Founder: Dr Stuart Quarmby
- Educational authority: New South Wales Department of Education
- Oversight: Sydney Anglican Schools Corporation
- Headmaster: Mr Trevor Norman
- Grades: Early learning and K–12
- Average class size: 30
- Campus size: 36 hectares (90 acres)
- Houses: Sollya, Telopea, Grevillea, Wollemi, Acacia
- Colours: Black, white and green
- Team name: Wollondilly Wildcats
- Newspaper: Waratah Weekly
- Website: www.wac.nsw.edu.au

Wollondilly Anglican College is a co-educational Preschool to Year 12 private school located in the Tahmoor, New South Wales, Australia. The College services families and communities from areas such as the Southern Highlands, Picton, Camden, Campbelltown and beyond.

== History ==
Opened in 2004 by former Prime Minister of Australia John Howard, Wollondilly Anglican College began its life teaching students from Kindergarten to Year 7.

The ANZAC Shelter was opened in 2018 by John Howard; Brendan Nelson, Director of the Australian War Memorial; Chief of Defence, Air Chief Marshal Mark Binskin; and Brig. General Phil Winter.

In 2016, the College and developer Bradcorp announced plans to build a new school at the proposed Wilton Junction.

== Buildings & facilities ==
The college buildings are named after famous Christian Australians. These include Joseph Banks, Dame Nellie Melba, Charles Sturt, Elizabeth Macarthur, John Flynn, Captain James Cook, and Alfred Deakin.

Some of the main facilities within the college include kitchens, workshops, an auditorium, science labs and music rooms.

== College structure ==
The College is divided into three main sections which include:

- Junior School (Transition – Year 4)
- Middle School (Year 5 – Year 8)
- Senior School (Year 9 – Year 12)

== Houses ==
College students are divided into 5 different house groups on enrolment. The house groups are named after native Australian plants. These groups are used primarily for competing in various different sporting events. The house groups are as follows:

- Sollya (blue)
- Telopea (red)
- Grevillea (maroon)
- Wollemi (green)
- Acacia (yellow)

== See also ==
- List of Anglican schools in New South Wales
- Anglican education in Australia
- Sydney Anglican Schools Corporation
