= Bishop Druitt College =

Location
- North Boambee, Coffs Harbour, Mid North Coast, New South Wales; Australia; 30°18′S 153°5′E

Information
- Type: Independent co-educational primary and secondary day school
- Motto: Faithfulness in Service
- Denomination: Anglicanism
- Established: 1994; 32 years ago
- Principal: Simon Doyle
- Years: K–12
- Enrolment: c. 1,200 (2024)
- Slogan: World Prepared
- Website: www.bdc.nsw.edu.au

Bishop Druitt College (abbreviated as BDC) is an independent Anglican co-educational primary and secondary day school located in North Boambee, a suburb of Coffs Harbour on the Mid North Coast of New South Wales, Australia.

Established in 1994, the college provides education from Kindergarten to Year 12 across primary, middle, and senior school divisions. The school is named in honour of Cecil Druitt, the first Bishop of the Anglican Diocese of Grafton.

== History ==
The establishment of Bishop Druitt College was initiated in the early 1990s by the Anglican Diocese of Grafton to address population growth and demand for independent schooling in the Coffs Harbour region. The school opened in 1994 with an initial intake of 57 primary school students.

Initial planning catered for an ultimate capacity of 600 students. However, ongoing regional growth led to a series of capital master plans expanding the campus infrastructure, allowing student enrolments to exceed 1,200 by the late 2000s.

== Campus and facilities ==
The college operates on a single campus situated in North Boambee, south-west of the Coffs Harbour central business district. The campus is divided into sub-schools to accommodate distinct age brackets: Primary (Kindergarten to Year 6), Middle School (Years 7 to 9), and Senior School (Years 10 to 12).

Facilities include specialised science laboratories, creative and performing arts spaces, trade training centres, and sports fields. The school infrastructure is integrated within the natural drainage basin of the Boambee Valley.

== Curriculum ==
Bishop Druitt College follows the curriculum set by the NSW Education Standards Authority (NESA).

- Primary Years (K–6): Covers fundamental Key Learning Areas (KLAs), focusing on early literacy, numeracy, and foundational social skills.
- Secondary Years (7–10): Includes mandatory core studies in English, Mathematics, Science, and Personal Development, Health and Physical Education (PDHPE), alongside elective subjects in Technology and Applied Studies (TAS), Humanities, Geography, and Visual Arts. Language options offered include French, Italian, and Japanese.
- Senior Years (11–12): Prepares students for the Higher School Certificate (HSC) or Vocational Education and Training (VET) pathways.

== Student life and house system ==
The school operates a vertical house system alongside horizontal peer groups organised by year level. The house system provides pastoral care, intra-school academic and sporting competitions, and community service projects.

The six houses are named after prominent figures in Australian history:

- Cottee – Named after solo circumnavigator Kay Cottee.
- Hollows – Named after ophthalmologist Fred Hollows.
- Kngwarreye – Named after Indigenous Australian artist Emily Kame Kngwarreye.
- Murray – Named after sports broadcaster and journalist Les Murray.
- O'Shane – Named after magistrate Pat O'Shane.
- Sutherland – Named after opera singer Joan Sutherland.

Students participate in regional independent sports inter-school events under the North Coast Independent Schools (NCIS) association.

== Governance and leadership ==
The college operates under the Anglican Diocese of Grafton governance framework, overseen by a College Council.

=== Principals ===
The following individuals have served as Principal of Bishop Druitt College:

Ordinal	Officeholder	Term start	Term end	Time in office
1	Victor Branson	1994	2004	10 years
2	Roger Oates	2004	2009	5 years
3	Alan Ball	2010	2017	7 years
4	Nick Johnstone	2018	2025	7 years
5	Simon Doyle	2025	Incumbent	1 year, 125 days

== See also ==
- List of Anglican schools in New South Wales
- Anglican education in Australia
