= Mosman Preparatory School =

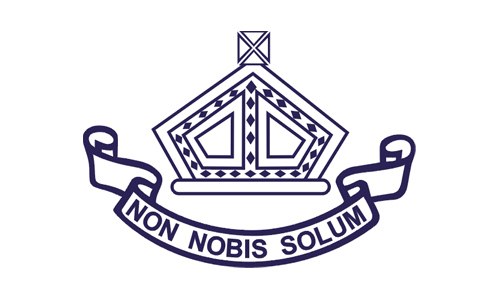

Location
- Lower North Shore and the Northern Beaches, Sydney, New South Wales; Australia; 33°49′58″S 151°14′24″E

Information
- Other name: Mosman Church of England Preparatory School
- Type: Independent single-sex primary day school
- Motto: Latin: Non nobis solum (Not for ourselves alone)
- Religious affiliation: Diocese of Sydney
- Denomination: Anglicanism
- Established: 1904; 122 years ago
- Educational authority: New South Wales Department of Education
- Chairman: Amanda Robertson
- Headmaster: Peter Grimes
- Gender: Boys
- Enrolment: c. 300
- Campuses: 75 Shadforth Street, Mosman; Terrey Hills: Outdoor education
- Campus type: Suburban
- Houses: Yarnold, MacDougall, Bradley
- Colours: Navy blue and white
- Slogan: Educating for tomorrow, today
- Nickname: Mosman Prep
- Website: www.mosmanprep.nsw.edu.au

The Mosman Preparatory School, officially the Mosman Church of England Preparatory School and commonly abbreviated as Mosman Prep, is a dual-campus independent Anglican single-sex primary day school for boys, located on the Lower North Shore and the Northern Beaches of Sydney, New South Wales, Australia. The school was established in 1904 and is based on the UK preparatory school system.

The school provides a religious and general education to boys from Year K to Year 6 across two campuses, located in Mosman and in Terrey Hills.

== History ==
Mosman Preparatory School was founded in 1904 by A. H. "Tibby" Yarnold, who aimed to create a school to which parents could "confidently send their boys". The school started with 26 boys with ages ranging from 9–14 and numbers grew but then dropped during the Great Depression, after which numbers steadily started to rise once more. There are now more than 300 boys attending the school, with the range of years being from Kindergarten to Year 6. The school opened its outdoor educational campus in Terrey Hills. Nowadays the school aims to provide a social and sporting as well as academic education.

== Campuses ==
The School has two campuses, the main school in the suburb of Mosman and its outdoor educational campus located in Terrey Hills, it was designed to teach students about the outdoors, to have a change in the learning environment from in a classroom to an open area and to be used as a sporting facility for weekend sport and training.

== Headmasters ==
The following individuals have served as Headmaster of Mosman Prep:

Ordinal	Officeholder	Term start	Term end	Time in office	Notes
1	A. H. Yarnold	1904	c. 1944	39–40 years	
2	E. C. Macdougall	c. 1944	1959	14–15 years	
3	P. Duffett	1959	1962	2–3 years	
4	Alan Bradley	1962	1977	14–15 years	
5	Ian Begbie	1978	1993	14–15 years	
6	Garry Brown OAM	1993	2019	32–33 years	Retired in Term 3, 2019
7	Peter Grimes	Incumbent			

== See also ==
- List of Anglican schools in New South Wales
- Anglican education in Australia
