= Broughton Anglican College =

Location
- Menangle Park, New South Wales; Australia; 34°6′8″S 150°46′5″E

Information
- Type: Independent co-educational early learning, primary and secondary day school
- Motto: Life Through Christ
- Denomination: Anglican
- Founded: 1986; 40 years ago
- Headmaster: Timothy Hewitt
- Years: Early learning and K–12
- Area: 27 hectares (67 acres)
- Campus type: Outer suburban
- Houses: Barker (Green); Darlington (Purple); Johnson (Red); Reddall (Yellow); Scott (Blue)
- Colours: Navy, red, white and yellow
- Website: www.broughton.nsw.edu.au

Broughton Anglican College is an independent Anglican co-educational early learning, primary and secondary day school, located at Menangle Park, an outer suburb of south-western Sydney, near Campbelltown, New South Wales, Australia. The college caters for approximately 1,306 students from early learning, through Year K to Year 12.

The college was founded in 1986 by John Darlington, who was the rector of St Peter's Anglican Church, Campbelltown, and began with the aim of providing secondary education based on Anglican principles for students progressing from St Peter's Anglican Grammar (Campbelltown). In 1997, the college added a junior school. Broughton Anglican College, along with St Peter's Anglican Grammar and St Peter's Heart, is under the umbrella organisation Campbelltown Anglican Schools, led by Executive Head and CEO Andrew Middleton and governed by Campbelltown Anglican Schools Council.

The college has had four headmasters, Ron Webb (Foundation Headmaster, 1986–2007), Paul Rooney (2007–2009), Don O'Connor (2009–2022), and Timothy Hewitt (2022–present).

In 2007 the school was affected by flash floods.

== Academic achievement ==
The school was named in NSW's Top 200 Schools in 2007, 2010 and 2012.

== See also ==
- List of Anglican schools in Australia
- List of schools in New South Wales
