= Fletcher, New South Wales =

Fletcher
- Suburb
- Interactive map of Fletcher
- Coordinates: 32°51′54″S 151°38′06″E
- Country: Australia
- State: New South Wales
- City: Newcastle
- LGA: City of Newcastle
- Location: 16 km (9.9 mi) WNW of Newcastle

Government
  - State electorate: Wallsend
  - Federal division: Newcastle

Area
  - Total: 7.8 km^{2} (3.0 sq mi)

Population
  - Total: 8,014 (SAL 2021)
- Postcode: 2287
- Parish: Hexham
Suburbs around Fletcher
Black Hill
Minmi	Fletcher	Maryland
		Wallsend

Fletcher is an outer western suburb of Newcastle, New South Wales, Australia, located 16 kilometres (10 mi) from Newcastle's central business district on the western edge of the City of Newcastle local government area. It likely takes its name from former local pioneer and politician James Fletcher.

Fletcher had a population of 8,014 in 2021.

The suburb also has a small shopping centre which features supermarkets, a bakery, butchers, cafe, takeouts, hair salon, and a liquor store. Fletcher also has Fletcher Community Centre, Kurraka Oval and Oak Close Reserve which is a recreational and sports area.
