= Scone Grammar School =

Location
- 60 Kingdon Street; Scone, New South Wales, 2337; Australia; 32.0517°S 150.8620°E

Information
- Funding type: Independent
- Motto: Latin: Floreat Scona
- Religious affiliation: Anglican
- Established: 1990
- Principal: Paul Smart
- Enrolment: ~730 (80 in Yellow Cottage Preschool) (2022)
- Houses: Jones, Ledger, Pulling
- Colour
- Website: S.G.S. Website

Scone Grammar School is a coeducational, independent, P–12, Anglican school, located in the town of Scone, New South Wales, in the Upper Hunter Valley region of Australia.

== Overview ==
Primary classes at Scone Grammar School are provided from kindergarten to year 6, and Senior classes from years 7 to 12.

The school operates in a Christian environment and has close ties to local Anglican organisations.

The Scone Grammar School initially operated from 1886 to 1917, with the school re-opening in 1990.

== Junior school :) ==
The Junior school provides a curriculum based on the six "Key Learning Areas" defined by the NSW Board of Studies: English, Mathematics, Human Society and Its Environment, Science and Technology, Creative Arts, and Personal Development, Health and Physical Education.

In addition, regular classes are provided in IT, French, Music, Library and Christian Studies.

Co-curricular programs provided for Junior school students include School Sport, Junior School Camps and Music.

== Senior school ==
The Senior school curriculum is split into 3 stages:

- Stage 4 (years 7 and 8)
- Stage 5 (years 9 and 10)
- Stage 6 (years 11 and 12)

Stage 5 works towards the equivalent of the former New South Wales School Certificate.

During stage 6, studies are tailored to the Preliminary Higher School Certificate, and the Higher School Certificate.

A structured careers programme is also part of the year 10, 11 and 12 curriculum.

Co-curricular programs provided for Senior school students include School Sport, Senior School Camps, Duke of Edinburgh's Award and Music.

== Scholarships ==
The school is an independent school, and tuition fees are applicable. There are, however, scholarships available:

- Academic – for students commencing years 5, 7, 9 and 11.
- Musical – for students commencing years 6 to 11.
- General excellence – for students commencing years 7 to 11.
- Exceptional academic ability – for a student in year 7.
- Leadership in the local community – for a student in year 9.

== House system ==
Students are allocated to one of three houses, for the duration of their time at the school.

- Jones (blue) – named after William Jones.
- Ledger (yellow) – named after Mr. and Mrs. Thomas Ledger.
- Pulling (red) – named after William Blomfield Pulling.

== Community ==
The school plays an active role in the local Anglican community, and provides pastoral care via its chaplain.

The school also organises and participates in local equestrian related events.

== Notable Alumni ==
- Lachlan Hails- Newcastle Knights academy player

== See also ==
- List of non-government schools in New South Wales
