= Shellharbour Anglican College =

School in New South Wales, Australia

Coordinates: 34°35′42″S 150°50′48″E

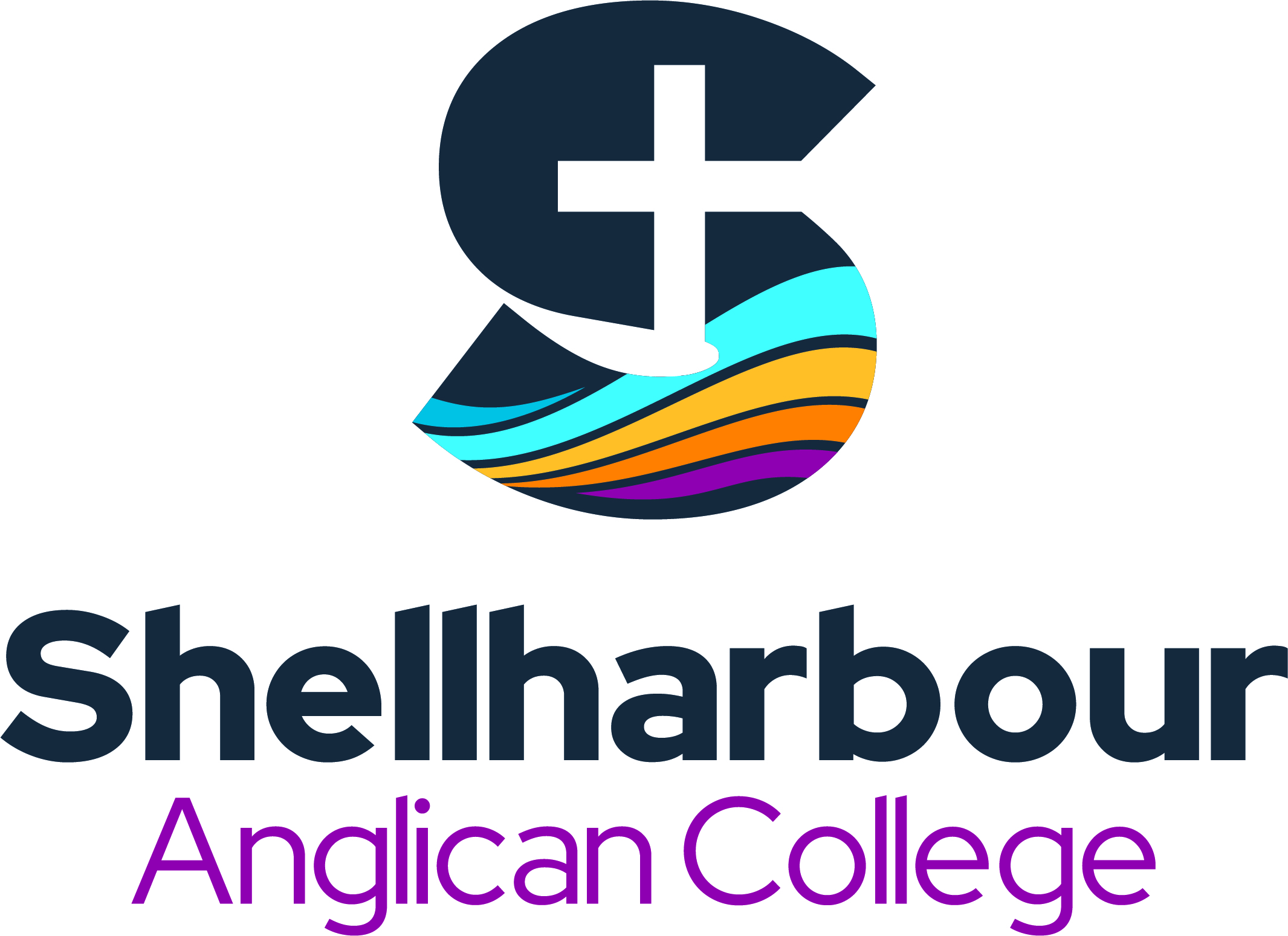
- Shellharbour City, New South Wales; Australia

Information
- Type: Independent, co-educational, day school
- Motto: Pursue Tomorrow
- Religious affiliation: Christianity
- Denomination: Anglican
- Established: 2004
- Educational authority: Sydney Anglican Schools Corporation
- Principal: Megan Hastie
- Grades: Preschool to Year 12
- Enrollment: 1,000+
- Campus: Semi-rural
- Colours: Blue, yellow, orange and magenta
- Website: www.shellharbourac.nsw.edu.au

Shellharbour Anglican College is a co-educational Anglican school operated by the Sydney Anglican Schools Corporation. It opened in 2004 and accommodates pupils from Preschool to Year 12. The college operates in new, mostly permanent buildings in a semi-rural setting off Shellharbour Road, Dunmore. The school is located in Shellharbour, New South Wales, Australia. Shellharbour Anglican College currently has 1,000+ students.

== History ==
Opening in 2004, Shellharbour Anglican College was founded to provide a Christian education for the City of Shellharbour and wider Illawarra region. Starting with just 93 students upon foundation, the first Year 12 cohort graduated in 2009, having grown to 510 students over a five-year period.

== Pastoral Care ==
=== Tutor groups ===
Each student is in a tutor group of 15–18 students with a tutor who is the main person responsible for their pastoral care. The Tutor Group meets regularly to enable the tutor to get to know each member of their group very well through a wide range of activities such as informal conversations, diary inspections, devotions, discussion of important issues, games, group celebrations and much more. In this way a tutor builds rapport with the members of their group and is able to guide them, correct them, and positively affirm them on a regular basis.

=== Head of House ===
The Head of House has a special role in the area of pastoral care in looking after the welfare of the students in their House group. They provide an important channel of communication between the student and classroom teacher and home and school and also focus on the particular needs of the whole House group.

=== Outdoor education ===
The college's Outdoor Education Program continues to be developed with a very strong focus on challenge and overcoming fears, friendship, teamwork and support of others. Students from Years K – 12 will be engaged in Outdoor Education and it is considered an integral part of our Pastoral Care system. For these reasons it is an optional activity for all students to save stress Year 11 will follow a modified program during the period that Years 5 to 6 are participating in Outdoor Education.

=== The 'House' system ===
The 'House' system is strongly linked to Tutor groups and students are encouraged to find ways to be involved in a wide range of co curricular activities including sport, music, drama and public speaking. Each House has a staff member to coordinate, staff assigned to assist and senior leaders to organise and enthuse students.

The house names have been produced from four contemporary Christian Australians who have made a valuable contributions to society. The Houses are Allen, Booth, Chapman, and Chiswell. Named from Carol Allen, Brian Booth, John Chapman, and Nicky Chiswell.
