= Lindisfarne Anglican Grammar School =

Location
- Terranora, Northern Rivers region, New South Wales; Australia; 28°14′2″S 153°30′22″E

Information
- Type: Independent co-educational early learning, primary, and secondary day school
- Motto: Latin: Luceat Lux Vestra (Let Your Light Shine)
- Religious affiliation: Anglican Diocese of Grafton
- Denomination: Anglicanism
- Established: 1981; 45 years ago
- Educational authority: New South Wales Department of Education
- President: Bishop Dr Murray Harvey
- Chair: Dominique O'Neill
- Principal: Stuart Marquardt
- Years: Early learning and K–12
- Enrolment: 1,620
- Campus: Sunshine Avenue, Tweed Heads South (Early learning – Year 4); Mahers Lane, Terranora (Year 5 – Year 12)
- Campus type: Regional
- Colours: Navy blue and gold
- Slogan: Let Your Light Shine
- Website: www.lindisfarne.nsw.edu.au

The Lindisfarne Anglican Grammar School is a dual campus independent Anglican co-educational early learning, primary, and secondary day school, located in the Northern Rivers region of New South Wales, Australia.

The school offers an integrated curriculum from early learning, through Kindergarten to Year 12. The school has two campuses, with early learning to Year 4 at Tweed Heads South, and Year 5 through to Year 12 in Terranora. It is located in the Anglican Diocese of Grafton.

== History ==
Lindisfarne Anglican Grammar School was established in 1981 by the Rector and parishioners of St Cuthbert's Church Tweed Heads. In 1996 the Senior School relocated to its permanent site at Mahers Lane Terranora, with the middle school joining it in 1997. The Preschool opened at the Junior School Campus in 1998.

== See also ==
- List of schools in the Northern Rivers and Mid North Coast
- List of Anglican schools in New South Wales
- Anglican Diocese of Grafton
