= Rouse Hill Anglican College =

Location
- Rouse Hill, New South Wales; Australia; 33°41′05″S 150°54′33″E

Information
- School type: Independent, co-educational, day school
- Motto: Understanding through Christ
- Denomination: Anglican
- Established: 2002
- Principal: Brett Hartley
- Employees: 170+
- Enrolment: 1600+
- Houses: Booth, Court, Cuthbert, Farr Jones
- Colours: Navy, gold, white
- Slogan: Understanding Through Christ
- Website: www.rhac.nsw.edu.au

Rouse Hill Anglican College, is an independent, co-educational, day school, located in Rouse Hill, New South Wales, Australia.

The school is non-selective and currently caters for over 1,600 students from Pre-K to Year 12.

== History ==
Plans for the College commenced in the late 1990s. The north-west growth corridor was targeted by the Sydney Anglican Schools Corporation as a suitable location for a new low-fee Anglican school. Rapid and sustainable population growth in the area were the factors that led to the decision to establish a school at Rouse Hill.

A number of sites were considered for the College on both sides of Windsor Road. The site chosen was the only available location on the southern side of Windsor Road that had access to town water and sewerage services. The site also boasted a good number of well-established trees and even includes a pocket of the Cumberland Plain Forest.

The College was founded in 2000 with a class of Kindergarten students based at Arndell Anglican College in Oakville.

The appointment of the foundation principal, Peter Fowler, took place in August 2001. At this time, enrolments and staff appointments were able to take place for the commencement of the College on site in February 2002.

The design of the original buildings at the Rouse Hill site was conducted by the architectural firm of Noel Bell Ridley Smith. The original concept was the responsibility of Ridley Smith and the detail and oversight of the early building projects had been the responsibility of Craig Stephen.

Between 2004 and 2008 the Rouse Hill Anglican Church congregation met for sunday services at the college.

Since opening in 2002 the College has seen steady growth. Today the College's grounds include specialist rooms, age-specific libraries, a dual purpose gymnasium-auditorium, dedicated study areas, two ovals, hardcourts, and a beach volleyball court.

== School governance ==
Rouse Hill Anglican College is owned by Sydney Anglican Schools Corporation, which is a body established by the Anglican Church Diocese of Sydney. Local policy is vested in a College Council which is appointed by the Corporation.

Day-to-day management including staffing, enrolments and educational programs are the responsibility of the principal.

== See also ==
- List of non-government schools in New South Wales
