= St Luke's Grammar School =

St Luke's Grammar

Location
- Northern Beaches, Sydney, New South Wales; Australia; 33°45′34″S 151°16′59″E

Information
- Former names: Roseby Preparatory School; Peninsula Grammar School; St Luke's Anglican School for Girls
- Type: Independent co-educational primary and secondary day school
- Motto: Christ Our Light
- Denomination: Anglicanism
- Established: 1993; 33 years ago
- Oversight: Sydney Anglican Schools Corporation
- Principal: Geoff Lancaster
- Staff: 267 (2026)
- Years: K–12
- Enrolment: Approx 1100 (2020)
- Campuses: Dee Why (Senior School); Bayview (Junior School)
- Colours: Royal blue and gold
- Slogan: Christ Our Light
- Affiliations: Heads of Independent Co-Educational Schools; New Anglican Schools' Sports' Association; Association of Heads of Independent Schools of Australia; Junior School Heads Association of Australia; Independent Primary School Heads of Australia; Association of Independent Co-Educational Schools; Association of Independent Schools of NSW
- Website: www.stlukes.nsw.edu.au

St Luke's Grammar School is a dual campus independent Anglican co-educational primary and secondary day school, located on the Northern Beaches of Sydney, New South Wales, Australia. The school was founded in 1993 as the amalgamation of Roseby Preparatory School, Peninsula Grammar School and St Luke's Anglican School for Girls. Geoff Lancaster is the third (and current) principal of St Luke's Grammar School, after Jann Robinson (2005–2020) and John Scott (1993–2004).

== Overview ==
On the Northern Beaches of Sydney, the school has approximately 1,100 students from Pre-K to Year 12.

St Luke's Grammar School's main Senior School campus is located in Dee Why. It also has a second junior school campus in Bayview, which succeeds the former Loquat Valley Anglican Preparatory School.

The school is affiliated with the Heads of Independent Co-Educational Schools (HICES), the New Anglican Schools' Sports' Association (NASSA), the Association of Heads of Independent Schools of Australia (AHISA), the Junior School Heads Association of Australia (JSHAA), the Independent Primary School Heads of Australia (IPSHAA), the Association of Independent Co-Educational Schools (AICES) and the Association of Independent Schools of NSW.

== History ==
St Luke's Grammar School began in February 1993, following the amalgamation of three Sydney Anglican Schools Corporation schools on Sydney's Northern Beaches: Roseby Preparatory (Junior High) School, Peninsula Grammar (Boys) School and St Luke's Anglican College for Girls.

The new K-12 co-educational school opened with 43 staff and 488 students, under the principalship of John Scott. During the first year, the school started its first Cottage (Preschool) class with 11 children, located in a house adjacent to the school. By the following year, the first Master Plan was unveiled, which involved the building of a multi-purpose hall as well as a new administration building and Technological and Applied Studies block.

The school was expanded by the introduction of a second Kindergarten class in 1995 and a third Year 7 in 1996. As a result of Scott's Study Leave to the UK and USA in 1997, St Luke's Middle School commenced in 1999. This lay the foundation for a fully double streamed Junior School and a fully triple streamed Senior School by 2001.

The school site has seen extensive building work over the years. In February 1997, the multi-purpose hall was officially opened by the Archbishop of Sydney. In 1998, work commenced on the St Luke's Junior Centre, accommodating classrooms for Cottage, Kindergarten and Year 1 and this was opened in 1999. A multimillion-dollar three-storey building housing the Library Resource Centre, Administration Offices and TAS opened in 2002. A third storey was added to the Junior School buildings in 2005, which involved the construction of the Link Building and the creation of a Common Room for Year 12 students.

With John Scott's retirement in 2004, Jann Robinson took over the leadership of the school, until Term 3 2020. Geoff Lancaster took over the leadership of the school beginning Term 4 2020.

In 2012 the school completed its most extensive building project to date, with a new four-storey multi-purpose centre containing outdoor basketball and tennis courts, Junior School classrooms, a Visual Arts centre, PDHPE classrooms, a function room, staff rooms and a two-storey car park for over 100 cars. 2013 saw the complete renovation and refurbishment of the Senior School, including more than 20 new classrooms, four new science laboratories, new student bathrooms, updated landscaping, green areas and student lockers. In 2020, a new Junior School Learning Precinct was completed, providing multiple learning spaces over four storeys and including outdoor play areas and landscaping.

Plans to extend the Dee Why campus by incorporating the land currently rented to office works and fitness first into an new senior only area, allowing greater enrolment numbers. This expansion was scheduled to be completed in time for February 2029, however it has been delayed since then.

== Controversy ==
August 2016: A number of female students were involved in a pornographic ring scandal.

September 2016: Two 13-year-old students were attacked in a "Muck-Up Day Prank"

June 2021: The school chaplain resigned after a string of articles exposing inappropriate content in Christian Studies classes, including homophobia, transphobia and sexism.

== Notable alumni ==
- Matthew Barton, Australian tennis player
- Emma Jeffcoat, Australian Triathlete

== See also ==
- List of Anglican schools in New South Wales
- Anglican education in Australia
