= Nowra Anglican College =

Location
- West Bunberra Street, Bomaderry, South Coast, New South Wales; Australia; 34°51′00″S 150°35′54″E

Information
- Type: Independent co-educational early learning primary and secondary day school
- Motto: In the Light of the Cross
- Denomination: Anglicanism
- Established: 2000; 26 years ago
- Educational authority: New South Wales Department of Education
- Oversight: Sydney Anglican Schools Corporation
- Chairman: Bill Shields
- Principal: Lorrae Sampson
- Years: Early learning and K–12
- Enrolment: c. 840
- Campus: Regional
- Colours: Navy blue, white and red tartan
- Affiliation: Junior School Heads Association of Australia
- Website: nac.nsw.edu.au

The Nowra Anglican College, (abbreviated as NAC), is an independent Anglican co-educational early learning, primary, and secondary day school, located on the corner of West Bunbera Street and the Princes Highway, in Bomaderry in the South Coast region of New South Wales, Australia.

Established in 2000 as a Kindergarten to Year 7 school, additional years were added with every year, and became Kindergarten to Year 12 school in 2005. In 2009 the College took over the management of Bomaderry Community Preschool. It is a member school of the Sydney Anglican Schools Corporation, currently with over 860 students.

== Principals ==
The following individuals served as Principal of Nowra Anglican College:

Ordinal	Officeholder	Term start	Term end	Time in office	Notes
1	Peter Jamieson	2000	2008	7–8 years	
2	Andrew Leslie (acting)	2009	2010	0–1 years	
3	Chris Pit	2010	2013	2–3 years	
4	Lorrae Sampson	2013	2026	12–13 years	
5	Jodie Bennet	2026	present	1 years	

== See also ==
- List of Anglican schools in New South Wales
- Sydney Anglican Schools Corporation
