= Sydney Anglican Schools Corporation =

Anglican Schools Corporation

Location
- Hurstville, New South Wales; Australia; 33°57′53″S 151°5′51″E

Information
- Type: System of independent, co-educational, day schools
- Motto: Serving Christ by equipping students for His world
- Denomination: Anglican
- Established: 1947; 79 years ago
- CEO: Peter Fowler
- Enrolment: ~15,000
- Website: www.tasc.nsw.edu.au

The Anglican Schools Corporation (TASC) is an independent, co-educational, school system established by the Anglican Church Diocese of Sydney headquartered in Hurstville, New South Wales, Australia.

The number of schools in The Anglican Schools Corporation group has increased from five in 1995 to twenty in 2016. The initial objective was to establish one new school per year. The school system now contains seventeen schools and is non-selective, and currently caters for approximately 15,000 students from kindergarten to year 12, with plans to grow.

== Relationship between the Corporation and member schools ==
The Corporation has a board to manage the overall budget and policies for members, including the establishment, financial maintenance and disestablishment of schools. The board is also responsible for the appointment and dismissal of school principals. The right of veto for principals’ appointment is held by local school councils. The chair of each local school council is appointed by the board. As an incorporated body, TASC can borrow funds for member schools, thus providing them with a working capital fund. There is a federated arrangement that all fees and grants that are raised by the school go to TASC and these are used to offset interest on loans. Schools cannot undertake major capital works that cost in excess of $30,000 without board approval. Each school has responsibility for the preparation and delivery of its budget and this is generally the responsibility of its school council. The principal reports to the school council but does not have voting rights. The school council monitors the management of the budget and is accountable to TASC board for the monthly budget report. The school council does not, however, have any involvement in the educational management of the school

== Financial information ==
The corporation received $88 million in taxpayer funding in 2009 while parents paid $85 million in fees, with the corporation posting a $20.7 million surplus in that year.

TASC, along with all diocesan organisations, is required to table audited accounts and annual reports at Synod which are then reviewed by the Finance Committee. Various questions have been raised at Synod about the organisation including questions about why the corporation does not make its accounts publicly available.

== History ==
=== Establishment of the Corporation ===
TASC commenced operations in 1992 by assuming ownership and control of five existing schools – Roseville College, Danebank, Claremont, St Luke's Grammar, and Peninsular Boys Grammar (now closed).

=== Establishment of low fee schools in Sydney’s growth areas ===
In 1995 Archbishop Goodhew encouraged a policy to establish Low Fee Anglican Schools in the developing areas of the Diocese, particularly Western Sydney.

Anglican schools had made a major contribution to education in the past, but they were concentrated in the eastern and northern areas of Sydney and generally were not accessible to Anglicans on moderate incomes. He believed that the Church should address this imbalance, and that Low Fee Anglican Schools could provide an important link with the community to enhance gospel outreach and church growth in these new areas.

The Anglican Schools Corporation was advancing this strategy but found it hard to compete with the systemic Catholic schools which could start new schools and also attract the highest category of funding. Without attracting the highest level of government funding, TASC was forced to have fees at least $500 p.a. higher.

By the end of 1995, TASC had done a lot of work to identify viable sites for new schools and had negotiated to secure land for at least three. It had even sought and gained government approval to start the schools and was ready to begin the first in 1997, but was reluctant to do so without access to the same level of high government funding as the Catholic systemic schools were able to attract.

=== Focussing resources for the Gospel ===
In 2001 the Synod adopted a ‘strategy driven’ model for the distribution of income where there were competing applications for funds by diocesan organisations. In order to guide the Synod the Standing Committee recommended the adoption of the Archbishop's statement of the diocesan mission and the priority it gives to evangelism.

=== Diocesan Mission ===
In 2002 the Synod adopted the Diocesan Mission, the Initial Goal and the Four-Fold Mission Policies which were as follows: Initial Goal – "To see at least 10% of the population of the Diocese in Bible-based Christian Churches in 10 years." Four-Fold Mission Policies:

- Policy 1: Spiritual renewal
- Policy 2: Increased number of congregations
- Policy 3: Training of ministers
- Policy 4: Structural change

The Archbishop then met with the head of the Sydney Anglican Schools Corporation to discuss the Diocesan Mission and the Four-Fold Mission Policies to consider the implications of each policy.

=== Establishment of a Mission Taskforce to review TASC ===
In December 2002 the Standing Committee asked the Mission Taskforce to (a) undertake a thorough review of the work and ministry of the Anglican Schools Corporation and to do so in consultation with its Board, taking into account its original charter, current and future educational plans and activities, financial and funding issues, governance and how its ministry fits in with the Diocesan Mission, and (b) report back to the Standing Committee with recommendations about future directions required to support the Diocesan Mission and any structural, ministry and financial changes that may be felt necessary.

In early 2004 the ‘New Capital Project’ was set up to achieve the Diocesan Mission – specifically to raise the large amounts of money required by selling assets or generate cashflows from existing assets The rationale behind the New Capital Project (the "Project") was to test the proposition that large amounts of money could be generated from existing Church assets for these needs. In July 2004, the Standing Committee passed the New Capital Project Appropriation Ordinance 2004 to provide funding for the costs of undertaking stage 1 of the Project. Stage 1 of the Project had 2 aims - (a) to develop a data base of existing Diocesan assets and other information about our parishes and organisations, and (b) to analyse those assets, or a selection thereof, to determine if strategies can be developed to generate funds to meet other capital needs in the Diocese. TASC, being a Diocesan organisation controlled by the Synod, was included in this project (Paragraph 19, Non-Schools Corporation schools were not included in this project. The intention was to quickly build the required capital to achieve the Mission. Some of the parishes that were targeted by the NCP expressed concerns. There were acknowledged sensitivities about the project, and the willingness of each parish to agree to selling assets was an issue.

=== Connection with Mission Property Committee ===
The MPC considers projects in the Diocese which are experiencing or are likely to experience a rapid increase in population and projects which are likely to lead to a rapid increase in the number of persons attending churches in the Diocese.

== List of current schools ==
School	Location	Founded	Type	Years
Arndell Anglican College	Oakville	1996	Coeducational	K-12
Claremont College	Randwick	1882	Coeducational	K-6
Danebank	Hurstville	1933	Girls	K-12
Mamre Anglican School	Erskine Park	2008	Coeducational	K-12
Macquarie Anglican Grammar School	Dubbo	2013	Coeducational	K-12
Nowra Anglican College	Bomaderry	2000	Coeducational	K-12
Nowra Anglican College	Nowra	2000	Coeducational	K-12
Oran Park Anglican College	Oran Park	2012	Coeducational	K-11
Orange Anglican Grammar School	Orange	2013	Coeducational	K-12
Penrith Anglican College	Orchard Hills	1998	Coeducational	K-12
Richard Johnson Anglican School	Oakhurst	1997	Coeducational	K-12
Roseville College	Roseville	1908	Girls	K-12
Rouse Hill Anglican College	Rouse Hill	2002	Coeducational	K-12
Shellharbour Anglican College	Dunmore	2004	Coeducational	K-12
St Luke's Grammar School	Dee Why	1993	Coeducational	K-12
Thomas Hassall Anglican College	Middleton Grange	2000	Coeducational	K-12
Trades Norwest Anglican Senior College	Glenwood	2007	Coeducational	11-12
Wollondilly Anglican College	Tahmoor	2004	Coeducational	K-12
Leppington Anglican College	Leppington	2023	Coeducational	K-12 (up to Year 8, 2024)
Marsden Park Anglican College	Marsden Park	2024	Coeducational	K-12 (up to Year 7, 2024)

== See also ==
- List of non-government schools in New South Wales
- List of Anglican schools in Australia
