= William Clarke College =

Location
- 1 Morris Grove; Kellyville, New South Wales; Australia; 33.711676°S 150.976471°E

Information
- Type: Independent, co-educational
- Motto: Christ Our Wisdom
- Religious affiliation: Anglican (evangelical)
- Founded: 1988
- Founder: Philip Bryson
- Headmaster: Alex Koch
- Colours: Teal, navy and gold
- Nickname: WCC
- School fees: $16,511 – $18,534 AUD per year
- Website: www.wcc.nsw.edu.au

William Clarke College is an independent, P–12, co-educational Anglican College located in Kellyville in Sydney's north west (Hills District), Australia.

== Notable alumni ==
- Joshua Katz (born 1997), Olympic and 11-time national champion judoka
- Nathan Katz (born 1995), Olympic and five-time national champion judoka
- James Peatling, AFL player

== See also ==
- List of non-government schools in New South Wales
