= Arndell Anglican College =

Location
- Oakville, New South Wales; Australia; 33°37′15″S 150°51′0″E

Information
- Type: Independent co-educational primary and secondary day school
- Denomination: Anglican
- Established: 1990
- Headmaster: Dr. Gareth Leechman
- Employees: 90
- Enrolment: c. 1,000
- Colours: Red, blue and white
- Slogan: Learning Through Christ
- School fees: As of 2025, A$9450 for Year 12 students.
- Website: www.arndell.nsw.edu.au

Arndell Anglican College is an independent Anglican co-educational primary and secondary day school located in the Sydney suburb of Oakville, New South Wales, Australia. The college includes students from Prep to Year 12.

== History ==
Arndell Anglican College was named after Thomas Arndell, one of Hawkesbury's first settlers. The college was originally established on the Macquarie Retreat in 1990, with Craig Laffin as the first headmaster.

=== 1990s ===
- 1993: The college is relocated to its present location at Oakville.
- 1995: Peter Walker becomes headmaster; the student population grows to over 800 students.
- 1996: The college becomes part of the Sydney Anglican Schools Corporation.

=== 2000s ===
- 2003: Dr John M. Goddard becomes headmaster, improving the curriculum and undertaking a number of building projects.
- 2009: Dr Gareth Leechman becomes headmaster.

=== 2010s ===
- 2014: The college introduces a laptop programme, providing students with laptops and necessary software. Tablets are given to junior students.
- 2015: The senior school is divided into two cohorts. Years 7 to 9 are deemed Junior Students, whereas years 10 to 12 are deemed Senior Students.
- 2015: The 25th anniversary of Arndell Anglican College is celebrated with one school day devoted to student activities, as well as other events throughout the year.
- 2016: The college is ranked within the top 150 schools in NSW based on HSC results.
- 2018: Headmaster Gareth Leechman signs a petition with the Anglican Church Diocese of Sydney to retain s 38(3) in the Sex Discrimination Act 1984 (Cth).
- 2019: Connor McLeod, a student at the college, speaks at TEDxSydney, reflecting upon his successful 2016 campaign to print tactile banknotes for visually impaired people.

=== 2020s ===
- 2020: The college is again ranked within the top 150 schools in NSW based on HSC results.

== Headmasters ==
The following individuals have served as headmaster of Arndell Anglican College:

Ordinal	Headmaster	Term start	Term end	Time in office	Notes
1	Craig Laffin	1990	1994	3–4 years	
2	Peter Walker	1995	2002	6–7 years	
3	Dr John M. Goddard	2003	2009	5–6 years	
4	Dr Gareth Leechman	2010	present	15–16 years	

Craig Laffin oversaw the establishment of the college at Cattai and its subsequent move to its current site at Oakville. He built the school community and educational ethos that influences the philosophy and daily life of the college.

Peter Walker saw the student population grow to over 800. He also transitioned the college into the Sydney Anglican Schools Corporation. The building infrastructure and financial security of the college was established during this time.

Dr Goddard built up the curriculum, especially in the faculty of music, and oversaw a significant number of building projects.

The current headmaster is Dr Gareth D Leechman. Leechman previously served as the headmaster at Clarence Valley Anglican School in Grafton, and has also been the Head of History and Head of House at Sydney Church of England Grammar School (Shore). In 2018, he signed a formal petition to retain s 38(3) in the Sex Discrimination Act 1984 (Cth).

== Curriculum ==
- The following studies were available to senior students 7-10 in 2019:
  - English
  - Mathematics
  - Science
  - Technological and Applied Studies (including agriculture, Computing technology, textiles and design, engineering)
  - Social Sciences
  - History
  - Creative Arts
  - Personal Development, Health and Physical Education (PDHPE)
  - Languages
  - Vocational Education Training (VET)
  - Mandatory Biblical Studies
- The following study's where available to senior students 11-12 in 2022-2023
  - English
  - LOTE (Including French and Italian)
  - Maths
  - Personal Development, Health and Physical Education (PDHPE)
  - Performing arts (including Drama and Music)
  - Science (Including Biology, Chemistry, Earth and Environmental Science, Investigating Science)
  - Social Science (Including Business studies, Economics, Geography, Legal Studies, Studies of religion unit 1 & 2, VET Business Services)
  - Technological and Applied Studies (Including Agriculture, Food Technology, Enterprise Computing, Software engineering, Textiles design, VET hospitality, Industrial Technology Grapics)
  - Visual Arts
  - Mandatory Biblical Studies

The college also offers a Gifted and Talented and Inclusive Learning programs.

== College Ethos ==
Arndell Anglican College is a Christian school that advocates religion strongly. Once a week, students attend chapel sermons discussing faith, the afterlife, and Jesus. The Arndell Way of Life stresses Christian morals and themes of unity, companionship, and acceptance. Similar understandings of life are taught in Biblical Studies, a class all students attend regardless of religious denomination or faith.

The college also aids many charities, such as the 40 Hour Famine for WorldVision.

The college's actions reflect its political conservatism and religious traditionalism views. It has advocated for strengthening religious freedoms.

== Culture ==
The crest builds on the legacy of the college. It is dominated by a central cross, indicating focus on Christ and his teachings. The rays signify an infusion of Christian thought, and the undulating lines represent the Hawkesbury River. The school colours of red and blue are distinctive among local schools.

== Governance ==
Arndell Anglican College is governed by a school council, which helps develop the college's facilities and growth. The current chairman of the council is Brenda King.

The school is part of the Sydney Anglican Schools Corporation and is affiliated with the Anglican Church Diocese of Sydney.

== HSC results ==
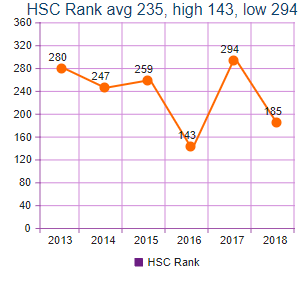

To the left is Arndell's HSC ranking according to BetterEducation.com.au, compared to all other schools sitting the HSC. The year 2016 was Arndell's best, with a ranking of 143 making it into the top 150 schools.
