= Arden Anglican School =

Arden

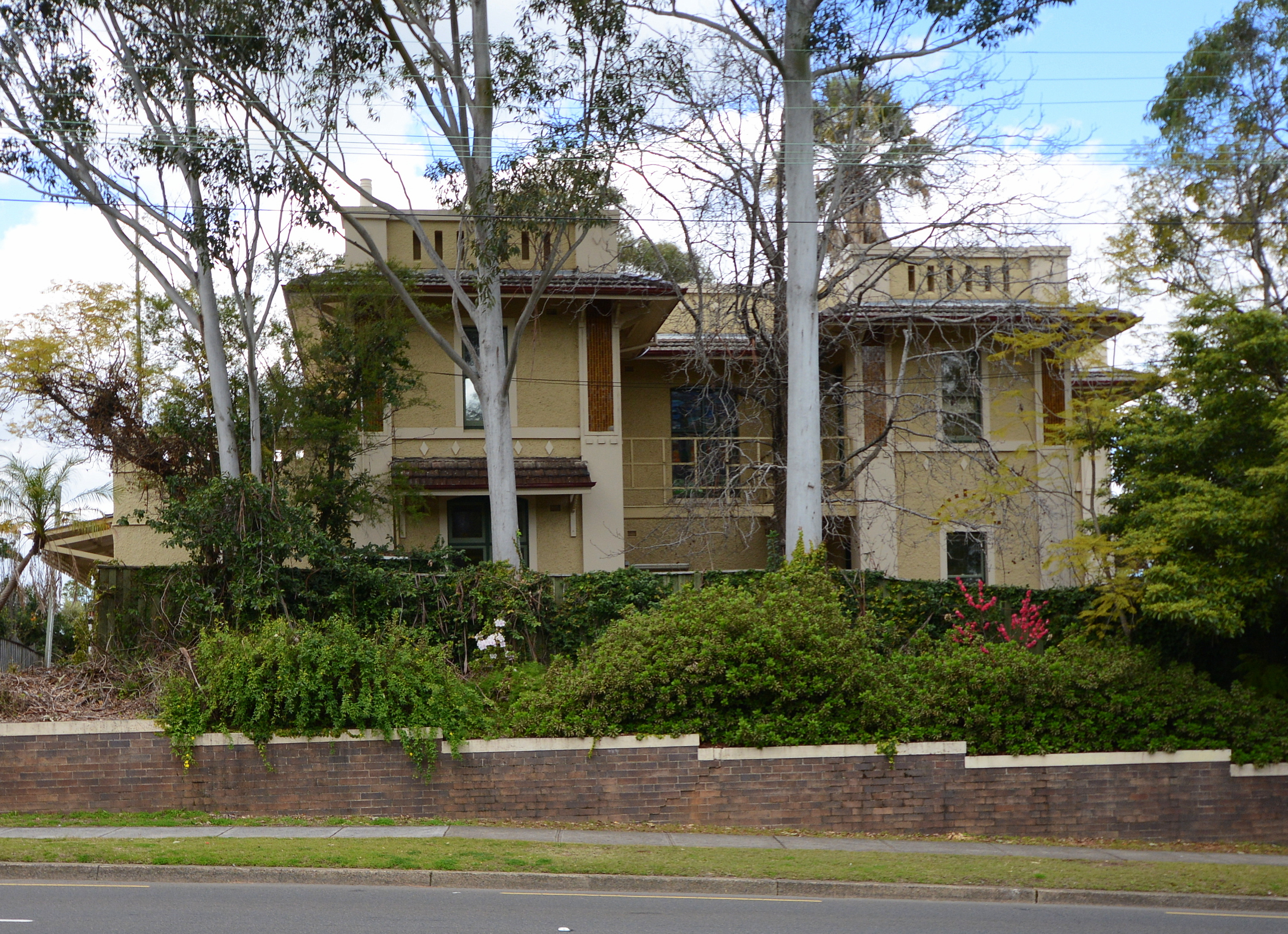

Location
- Beecroft and Epping, New South Wales; Australia; 33°46′13″S 151°5′2″E

Information
- Type: Independent co-educational early learning, primary and secondary day school
- Motto: In God, my Joy
- Denomination: Anglican
- Established: 1922; 104 years ago
- Chair: Santino Dimarco
- Principal: Justin Beckett
- Chaplain: Graham Thomas
- Employees: ~63
- Key people: David Watkins, Matthew Mallison, Simon Przydacz
- Years: Early learning and K–12
- Enrolment: 944 (P–12)
- Campus: Beecroft and Epping
- Campus type: Suburban
- Colours: Green and white
- Affiliation: Association of Heads of Independent Schools of Australia; Independent Primary School Heads of Australia; Junior School Heads Association of Australia; Association of Independent Co-Educational Schools; Association of Independent Schools of New South Wales
- Website: arden.nsw.edu.au

Arden Anglican School is an independent school located in Beecroft and Epping, suburbs on the North Shore of Sydney, New South Wales, Australia. It is a co-educational early learning, primary and secondary day school.

The school was established in 1922 as a preparatory feeder school for the Presbyterian Ladies' College, Sydney, and now caters to approximately 700 students from pre-school to Year 12. Arden's first Year 12 (matriculating) class started classes in 2008, before which it did not have a secondary school.

Initially, from 1922 to 1933, Arden functioned solely as a girls' school. The school became co-educational in 1933. Some of the noteworthy organisations with which Arden Anglican School is associated include the Association of Heads of Independent Schools of Australia (AHISA), the Independent Primary School Heads of Australia (IPSHAA) and Junior School Heads Association of Australia, the Association of Independent Co-Educational Schools, and the Association of Independent Schools of New South Wales.

== Heads Of ==
Arden Heads of Departments
Name	Position	Campus
Justin Beckett	Principal	Both
Graham Thomas	Chaplain	Both
Joshua Harnwell	Deputy Principal	Both
Craig Murray	Director of IT	Both
Catherine Gray	Business Manager	Both
Rachel Marchetto	Director of Community Engagement	Both
David Watkins	Head of Junior Campus	Junior Campus, Beecroft
Lucy Koorey	Head of Upper Primary	Junior Campus, Beecroft
Jo Graham	Head of Lower Primary	Junior Campus, Beecroft
Linda Bialous	Preschool Director	Junior Campus, Beecroft
Laura Anderson	Director of Teaching and Learning	Secondary Campus, Epping
Matthew Mallison	Head of Middle School	Secondary Campus, Epping
Simon Pryzdacz	Head of Senior School	Secondary Campus, Epping
Ruth Middleton	Head of Mathematics	Secondary Campus, Epping
Mora Soliman	Head of Science	Secondary Campus, Epping
Rodney Henderson	Head of HSIE	Secondary Campus, Epping
Karen Moss	Head of Geography	Secondary Campus, Epping
Nicole Morris	Head of English	Secondary Campus, Epping
Sam Hwang	Head of Christian Studies	Secondary Campus, Epping
Sam Hwang	Assistant Chaplain	Secondary Campus, Epping
Samantha Allen	Head of Music	Secondary Campus, Epping
Samantha Allen	Head of Drama	Secondary Campus, Epping
Philippa Wood	Head of Co-Curricular Music	Both
Janet Lawrence	Head of Co-Curricular Sport	Both
Rob Riley	Head of Visual Arts	Secondary Campus, Epping
Adelie Badman	Head of Languages	Secondary Campus, Epping
Melissa Collins	Head of PDHPE	Secondary Campus, Epping
Elizabeth Seares	Head of TAS	Secondary Campus, Epping
Lyn Pellizzon	Head of Information Services	Secondary Campus, Epping
Jo Webb	Head of Learning Support	Secondary Campus, Epping
Carlene Ryder	Head of Counselling Services	Both

== History ==
Arden Anglican College began as a preparatory school of the Presbyterian Ladies' College, Sydney (PLC Sydney). The idea of a PLC Sydney preparatory school on the northern railway line, had first been suggested c. 1915. On 23 February 1922, the PLC Council received a request from the Beecroft Presbyterian Congregation, that a primary school be established at Cheltenham. Subsequently, a sub-committee of the Council was formed to investigate its viability and inspect a number of sites in Beecroft and Pennant Hills.

Council gave the committee power to open a preparatory school in the Beecroft Church Hall, to appoint a teacher-in-charge and to make any other arrangements necessary. By the April 1922 council meeting, it was reported that the school had been opened at Beecroft with 13 female pupils, and with Eleanor Linck in charge. This school was named the Presbyterian Ladies' College, Beecroft and was to serve as an all-girls, primary feeder school for the Presbyterian Ladies' College, Croydon.

Over the next few years, enrolments grew and an assistant teacher was appointed. However, PLC Beecroft was not a financial success and Council enthusiasm began to wane. Linck tried her best to expand the school, suggesting that "Romana House" on Beecroft Road be purchased to allow for further enrolments, and that the house next door to the Church Hall be purchased so that boarders could be accommodated. Despite the school's strong number of enrolment applications, these requests were all declined.

In 1925, an additional teacher was appointed to teach kindergarten and sports. It was reported that the local community was taking an interest in the new PLC, as that year two prizes had been presented to the school by the Beecroft School of Arts for library proficiency, and the Beecroft Presbyterian Women's Guild presented a prize for Scripture. In 1926, Mrs. Linck resigned to take up a position at the Presbyterian Ladies' College, Melbourne, and Mrs. Lucy I. Ritter was appointed head. Later that year, two council members suggested that a house be purchased to expand the school and widen its tuition scope, however again nothing came of this. The Council now appeared to be uninterested in the Beecroft school.

Ritter, in the Assembly report for 1927, complained that Beecroft deserved more support from Presbyterians. On June 19, 1929, the school was closed down due to financial losses. Ritter, and the assistant teacher Ms. Gurney, resigned in December of that year. In 1930, Gurney reopened the school in the Church Hall, which she named "Arden" after the Shakespearean Forest of Peace in As You Like It. The school flourished under her leadership.

Arden came under the control of the Anglican Diocesan Schools in 1946, and subsequently moved to St John's Beecroft Church Hall where it was named Arden Anglican College. The college moved again in 1952 to a house in Wongala Crescent, and in 1962, a property was purchased on Beecroft Road.

In 2000, due to demand from the local community, preliminary plans for a secondary school at Arden began. The school purchased the former site of the Australian American International School at Oxford Street, Epping in 2001, and in 2003, the first year 7 class commenced at the new senior campus. Yearly expansion continued since then and concluded with the first Year 12 class graduating in 2008. 2008 also saw the opening of the Senior Studies Centre. Located directly opposite the secondary campus, it facilitates learning for year 11 and 12 (Preliminary and HSC) students in a "corporate-style" environment. In 2017, Arden announced a planned $21 million redevelopment of its Epping campus. In 2018, the Principal Graham Anderson signed a petition with the Anglican Diocese of Sydney to retain s38(3) in the Sex Discrimination Act 1984 which allows private religious schools to discriminate against staff and students based on sexual orientation. In the petition it was argued that "a more general right" to religious freedom should exist, and the existing statutory 'exemptions should remain.

In 2017, Arden announced a $21 million redevelopment of its Secondary Campus in Epping, to be finished in early 2020, in what would become known as 'Essex'.

== Governance ==
Arden Anglican School is governed by the council. The Synod of the Anglican Diocese of Sydney elects 10 persons for the council, along with the other persons appointed by the archbishop.

The role of the council is to serve the Arden community by ensuring long term planning is undertaken, appropriate policies are implemented and that finances are managed in a prudent manner. The council also appoints the principal. The day-to-day operations of the school are managed by the principal in which they also report to the council. The council meets on the first Wednesday of each month during term time and there are three committees of the council:

- Finance
- Governance
- Property Development and Planning

== Campus ==
Arden Anglican School is located on two campuses in the north-western suburbs of Sydney. The preschool and primary school are in Beecroft, while the secondary school is located 200 metres (660 ft) from Epping railway station, in the suburb of Epping.

== Curriculum ==
The primary school follows a curriculum mandated by the NSW Board of Studies, and where required is tailored to meet the needs of individual students. Specialist teachers are used for subjects such as Physical Education (PE), Music, Art, French language, Science, Library, Computer and Problem Solving.

The secondary school also follows the Board of Studies curriculum. In 2008, the first year 12 class completed the NSW Higher School Certificate.

== Co-curriculum ==
=== Sport ===
Arden offers sport to all year levels, and students may partake in house and inter school competitions.

Through Arden's membership of the Junior School Heads Association of Australia, Primary students may represent the school in sports such as athletics, swimming, cross-country, gymnastics, T-ball, softball, minkey (mini hockey), hockey, netball, basketball, rugby, and women's soccer.

Secondary students may represent Arden in cricket, basketball, soccer (indoor/outdoor), rugby, netball, athletics, cross-country, softball, hockey, in the HZSA (Hills Zone Sports Association).

Every year there are various sporting events where the three houses (Birnam, Sherwood and Jenolan) compete. These events include the swimming carnival, cross-country and athletics carnival.

Arden has been recently recognized as a leading sports school in the Hillzone sports for 2012.

Arts

Arden offers a wide range of performing arts opportunities, including but not limited to band, wind ensemble, orchestra, secondary vocal ensemble, and chamber choir. There are a multitude of clubs ranging from robotics to philosophy. The Arden Creative Arts Centre (TACAC) has a purpose-built theatre that regularly hosts Theatresports and Drama class performances.

== See also ==
- List of non-government schools in New South Wales
