= Anglican education in Australia =

Anglican education in Australia refers to the education services provided by the Anglican Church of Australia (formerly known as the Church of England in Australia) within the Australian education system. Since the late 18th century, the Anglican Church has been an important provider of education services within Australia. There are around 145 Anglican schools in Australia, providing for more than 105,000 children.

== History ==
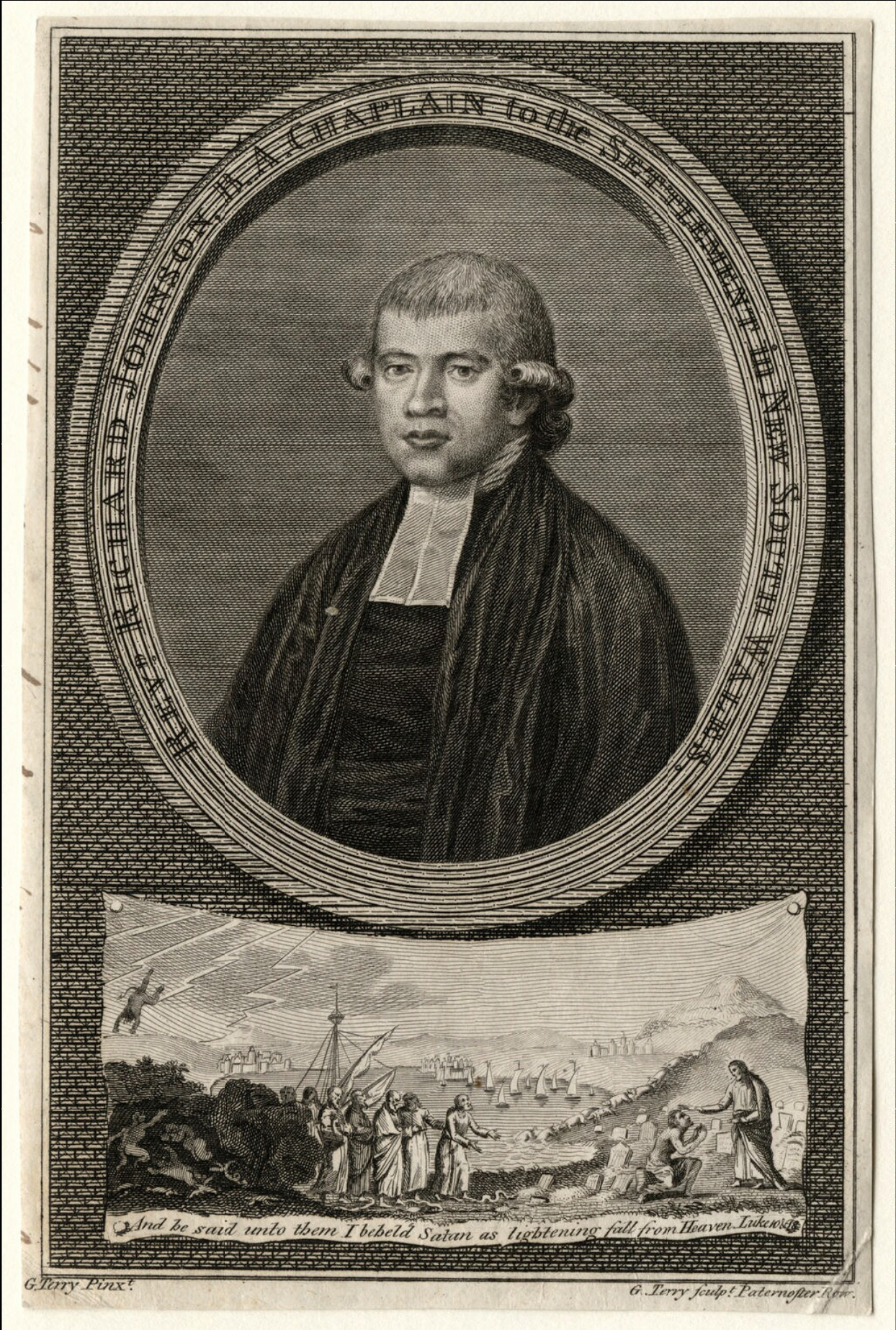
Richard Johnson, chaplain to the First Fleet, was charged with the organisation of schooling.

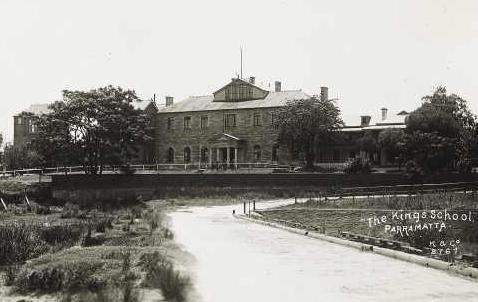
The King's School, Parramatta, c.1890.

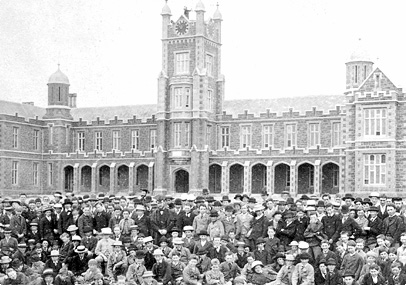
Melbourne Grammar School students and building, c. 1914

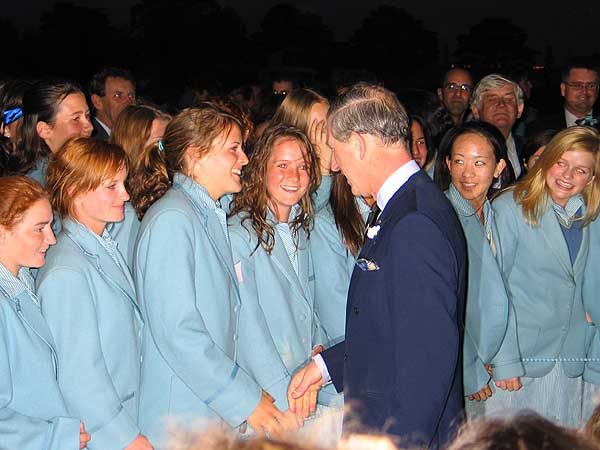
Prince Charles in 2005 with students from his Australian alma mater, Geelong Grammar.

The permanent presence of Christianity in Australia came with the arrival of the First Fleet of British convict ships at Sydney in 1788. As a British colony, the predominant Christian denomination was the Church of England. In early colonial times, Church of England clergy worked closely with the governors. Richard Johnson, Anglican chaplain to the First Fleet, was charged by the governor, Arthur Phillip, with improving "public morality" in the colony, but he was also heavily involved in health and the organisation of schooling. The first schools in Australia were Christian schools established by the Church of England in the early days of British settlement in the late 1700s. Free "charity schools" run by other denominations gradually came into existence later. Roman Catholic convicts were initially compelled to attend Church of England services and their children and orphans were raised by the authorities as Anglicans.

At the instigation of the then British Prime Minister and the Duke of Wellington - and with the patronage of King William IV - Australia's oldest surviving independent school, The King's School, Parramatta, was founded in 1831 as part of an effort to establish grammar schools in the colony. The Church of England lost its legal privileges in the Colony of New South Wales by the Church Act of 1836. Drafted by the reformist attorney-general John Plunkett, the act established legal equality for Anglicans, Roman Catholics and Presbyterians and was later extended to Methodists.

In 1872, Victoria became the first Australian colony to pass an education act providing for free and secular public education. The other colonies followed over the following two decades. Though an enduring network of Anglican schools had already begun to be established, the subsequent withdrawal of state aid for church schools did not prompt the Anglican Church to rigorously set out to establish of an independent network as did the Roman Catholic Church in Australia.

The Anglican Schools Commission (ASC) was established in 1985 and given the role of creating affordable Christian education in the Anglican tradition accessible to the disadvantaged and children with disabilities. The Australian Anglican Schools Network is the Educational Network of the Australian General Synod. The Anglican Education Commission was re-established by the Synod in 2007 in an effort to advance the Sydney diocese's commitment to bolstering Christian education and assisting both teachers and workers involved in education to do so through the lens of the Gospel's values.

In the 21st century, the church remains a significant provider of social welfare and education. There are around 145 Anglican schools in Australia, providing for more than 105,000 children. Church affiliated schools range from low-fee, regional and special needs schools to high-fee leading independent schools such as Geelong Grammar (whose alumni include Prince Charles and Rupert Murdoch); Melbourne Grammar School (alma mater to Barry Humphries) and Sydney's King's School, Abbotsleigh, Sydney Church of England Grammar School, SCEGGS Darlinghurst, Canberra Grammar School and The Southport School in Queensland.

== Administration and funding ==
In Australia, the state and territory governments have the primary responsibility for funding state government schools and also provide supplementary assistance to non-government schools, while the Australian Federal Government is the primary source of public funding for non-government schools (while also providing supplementary assistance to government schools). These public funds subsidise the fees paid by parents for the education of their children at Anglican schools, with the overall effect of reducing the numbers and therefore burden on public funding for government schools. Most non-government schools have some religious affiliation (with approximately two-thirds of their students enrolled in Catholic schools). In the final year of secondary schooling, students at both government and non-government schools sit for a government-endorsed certificate that is recognised by all Australian universities and vocational education and training institutions. Thus, Anglican schools may freely teach and encourage religious studies, values and community engagement but must adhere to the broader requirements of Australia's secular education system.

== Ethos ==
While Anglican schools must adhere to the broad requirements of Australia's secular education system, they are free to provide an "Anglican" ethos and Christian education. Furthermore, Anglican schools adopt the values of the Gospel within the educational domain.

== See also ==
- Public and private education in Australia
- Education in Australia
- Christianity in Australia
- Catholic education in Australia
- List of Anglican schools in Australia
  - List of Anglican schools in New South Wales
