= List of non-government schools in New South Wales =

This is a list of non-government schools in the state of New South Wales, current as of June 2023.

== Catholic primary schools ==
School	Suburb or town	LGA	Years	M/F/Co-ed	Category	Founded
All Hallows Catholic Primary School	Five Dock	Canada Bay	K–6	Co-ed	Systemic	1919
All Hallows Catholic Primary School	Gulgong	Mid-Western	K–6	Co-ed	Systemic	1883
All Saints Catholic Primary School	Tumbarumba	Ku-ring-gai	K–6	Co-ed	Systemic	1955
The Assumption Catholic Primary School	Bathurst	Bathurst	K–6	Co-ed	Systemic	1952
Bethany Catholic Primary School	Glenmore Park	Penrith	K–6	Co-ed	Systemic	1996
Blessed Sacrament Catholic Primary School	Clifton Gardens	Mosman	K–6	Co-ed	Systemic	1950
Cathedral Catholic Primary School	Bathurst	Bathurst	K–6	Co-ed	Systemic	1842
Catherine McAuley Catholic Primary School	Orange	Orange	K–6	Co-ed	Systemic	2012
Chisholm Catholic Primary School	Bligh Park	Hawkesbury	K–6	Co-ed	Systemic	1994
Christ the King Catholic Primary School – Bass Hill	Yagoona	Canterbury-Bankstown	K–6	Co-ed	Systemic	1957
Christ the King Catholic Primary School	North Rocks	Parramatta	K–6	Co-ed	Systemic	1973
Corpus Christi Catholic Primary School	Cranebrook	Penrith	K–6	Co-ed	Systemic	1987
Corpus Christi Catholic Primary School	St Ives	Ku-ring-gai	K–6	Co-ed	Systemic	1954
Corpus Christi Catholic Primary School	Waratah	Newcastle	K–6	Co-ed	Systemic	1933
Father John Therry Catholic Primary School	Balmain	Inner West	K–6	Co-ed	Systemic	1995
Galilee Catholic Primary School	Bondi Beach	Waverley	K–6	Co-ed	Systemic	2002
Good Samaritan Catholic Primary School	Fairy Meadow	Wollongong	K–6	Co-ed	Systemic	2012
Good Shepherd Catholic Primary School	Hoxton Park	Liverpool	K–6	Co-ed	Systemic	1997
Good Shepherd Catholic Primary School	Plumpton	Blacktown	K–6	Co-ed	Systemic	1979
Henschke Primary School	Wagga Wagga	Wagga Wagga	K–6	Co-ed	Systemic	1952
Holy Cross Catholic Primary School	Glendale	Lake Macquarie	K–6	Co-ed	Systemic	1957
Holy Cross Catholic Primary School	Glenwood	Blacktown	K–6	Co-ed	Systemic	1999
Holy Cross Catholic Primary School	Helensburgh	Wollongong	K–6	Co-ed	Systemic	1900
Holy Cross Catholic Primary School	Kincumber	Central Coast	K–6	Co-ed	Systemic	1991
Holy Cross Catholic Primary School	Woollahra	Woollahra	K–6	Co-ed	Systemic	1906
Holy Family Catholic Primary School	Emerton	Blacktown	K–6	Co-ed	Systemic	2004
Holy Family Catholic Primary School	Granville East	Cumberland	K–6	Co-ed	Systemic	1938
Holy Family Catholic Primary School	Ingleburn	Campbelltown	K–6	Co-ed	Systemic	1982
Holy Family Catholic Primary School	Kelso	Bathurst	K–6	Co-ed	Systemic	1979
Holy Family Catholic Primary School	Lindfield	Ku-ring-gai	K–6	Co-ed	Systemic	1927
Holy Family Catholic Primary School	Luddenham	Penrith	K–6	Co-ed	Systemic	1990
Holy Family Catholic Primary School	Menai	Sutherland	K–6	Co-ed	Systemic	1986
Holy Family Catholic Primary School	Merewether Beach	Newcastle	K–6	Co-ed	Systemic	1956
Holy Family Catholic Primary School	Parkes	Parkes Shire	K–6	Co-ed	Systemic	1971
Holy Family Catholic Primary School	Skennars Head	Ballina	K–6	Co-ed	Systemic	1997
Holy Innocents' Primary School	Croydon	Inner West	K–6	Co-ed	Systemic	1927
Holy Name Primary School	Forster	MidCoast Council	K–6	Co-ed	Systemic	1961
Holy Saviour School	Greenacre	Canterbury-Bankstown	K–6	Co-ed	Melkite Greek Catholic	2000
Holy Spirit Catholic Primary School	Carnes Hill	Liverpool	K–6	Co-ed	Systemic	2002
Holy Spirit Catholic Primary School	Kurri Kurri	Cessnock	3–6	Co-ed	Systemic	1908
Holy Spirit Catholic Primary School	Lavington	Albury	K–6	Co-ed	Systemic	1971
Holy Spirit Catholic Primary School	North Ryde	Ryde	K–6	Co-ed	Systemic	1958
Holy Spirit Catholic Primary School	St Clair	Penrith	K–6	Co-ed	Systemic	1985
Holy Spirit Infants School	Abermain	Cessnock	K–2	Co-ed	Systemic	1908
Holy Trinity Primary School	Granville	Cumberland	K–6	Co-ed	Systemic	1885
Holy Trinity West Wagga	Wagga Wagga	Wagga Wagga	K–6	Co-ed	Systemic	1970
Immaculate Heart of Mary Catholic Primary School	Sefton	Cumberland	K–6	Co-ed	Systemic	1948
John The Baptist Primary School	Bonnyrigg	Fairfield	K–6	Co-ed	Systemic	1989
Maria Regina Catholic Primary School	Avalon Beach	Northern Beaches	K–6	Co-ed	Systemic	1959
Marion Catholic Primary School	Horsley Park	Fairfield	K–6	Co-ed	Systemic	1982
Mary Help of Christians Primary School Sawtell	Toormina	Coffs Harbour	K–6	Co-ed	Systemic	1980
Mary Immaculate Catholic Primary School	Bossley Park	Fairfield	K–6	Co-ed	Systemic	1985
Mary Immaculate Catholic Primary School (formerly St Mary's Catholic Primary School)	Eagle Vale	Campbelltown	K–6	Co-ed	Systemic	1986
Mary Immaculate Catholic Primary School	Quakers Hill	Blacktown	K–6	Co-ed	Systemic	1987
Mater Dei Primary School	Blakehurst	Georges River	K–6	Co-ed	Systemic	1966
Mater Dei Primary School	Wagga Wagga	Wagga Wagga	K–6	Co-ed	Systemic	1990
McAuley Primary School	Rose Bay	Woollahra	K–6	Co-ed	Systemic	1967
Mother Teresa Primary School	Westmead	Cumberland	K–6	Co-ed	Systemic	2012
Mount Carmel School	Yass	Yass Valley	K–6	Co-ed	Systemic	1917
Mount St John Primary School	Dorrigo	Bellingen Shire	K–6	Co-ed	Systemic	1924
Mount St Patrick Primary School	Murwillumbah	Tweed Shire	K–6	Co-ed	Systemic	1904
Nazareth Catholic Primary School	Shellharbour City Centre	Shellharbour	K–6	Co-ed	Systemic	2001
Our Lady Help of Christians Catholic Primary School	Epping	Parramatta	K–6	Co-ed	Systemic	1908
Our Lady Help of Christians Catholic Primary School	Rosemeadow	Campbelltown	K–6	Co-ed	Systemic	1989
Our Lady Help of Christians Primary School	Lismore South	Lismore	K–6	Co-ed	Systemic	1917
Our Lady of Dolours Catholic Primary School	Chatswood	Willoughby	K–6	Co-ed	Systemic	1896
Our Lady of Fatima School	Caringbah	Sutherland	K–6	Co-ed	Systemic	1950
Our Lady of Fatima School	Kingsgrove	Canterbury-Bankstown	K–6	Co-ed	Systemic	1951
Our Lady of Good Counsel Catholic Primary School	Forestville	Northern Beaches	K–6	Co-ed	Systemic	1962
Our Lady of Lourdes Primary School	Baulkham Hills	The Hills	K–6	Co-ed	Systemic	1963
Our Lady of Lourdes Primary School	Earlwood	Canterbury-Bankstown	K–6	Co-ed	Systemic	1923
Our Lady of Lourdes Primary School	Seven Hills	Parramatta	K–6	Co-ed	Systemic	1963
Our Lady of Lourdes Primary School	Tarro	Newcastle	K–6	Co-ed	Systemic	1944
Our Lady of Mount Carmel Primary School	Bonnyrigg	Fairfield	K–6	Co-ed	Systemic	1952
Our Lady of Mount Carmel Primary School	Waterloo	Sydney	K–6	Co-ed	Systemic	1858
Our Lady of Mount Carmel Primary School	Wentworthville	Parramatta	K–6	Co-ed	Systemic	1920
Our Lady of Perpetual Succour Catholic Primary School	West Pymble	Ku-ring-gai	K–6	Co-ed	Systemic	1962
Our Lady of the Angels Primary School	Kellyville	The Hills	K–6	Co-ed	Systemic	2010
Our Lady of The Assumption Catholic Primary School	North Strathfield	Strathfield	K–6	Co-ed	Systemic	2015
Our Lady of The Nativity Primary School	Lawson	Blue Mountains	K–6	Co-ed	Systemic	1929
Our Lady of The Rosary Catholic Primary School	Fairfield	Fairfield	K–6	Co-ed	Systemic	1928
Our Lady of The Rosary Catholic Primary School	Kellyville	The Hills	K–6	Co-ed	Systemic	1979
Our Lady of The Rosary Catholic Primary School	Kensington	Randwick	K–6	Co-ed	Systemic	1907
Our Lady of The Rosary Catholic Primary School	Shelly Beach	Central Coast	K–6	Co-ed	Systemic	1952
Our Lady of The Rosary Catholic Primary School	St Marys	Penrith	K–6	Co-ed	Systemic	1880
Our Lady of The Rosary Catholic Primary School	Waitara	Hornsby	K–6	Co-ed	Systemic	1898
Our Lady of The Rosary Catholic Primary School	Wyoming	Central Coast	K–6	Co-ed	Systemic	1977
Our Lady of The Sacred Heart School	Randwick	Randwick	K–6	Co-ed	Systemic	1881
Our Lady of The Way Primary School	Emu Plains	Penrith	K–6	Co-ed	Systemic	1979
Our Lady of Victories Primary School	Shortland	Newcastle	K–6	Co-ed	Systemic	1957
Our Lady Queen of Peace Primary School	Gladesville	Ryde	K–6	Co-ed	Systemic	1925
Our Lady Queen of Peace Primary School	Greystanes	Cumberland	K–6	Co-ed	Systemic	1957
Our Lady Star of the Sea Catholic Primary School	Miranda	Sutherland	K–6	Co-ed	Systemic	1950
Our Lady Star of The Sea Catholic Primary School	Terrigal	Central Coast	K–6	Co-ed	Systemic	1979
Prouille Catholic Primary School	Wahroonga	Ku-ring-gai	K–6	Co-ed	Systemic	1950
Redfern Jarjum College	Redfern	Sydney	K–6	Co-ed	Jesuit	2010
Regina Coeli Catholic Primary School	Beverly Hills	Georges River	K–6	Co-ed	Systemic	1947
Rosary Park Catholic School	Branxton	Hunter Region	K–6	Co-ed	Systemic	2011
Sacred Heart Catholic Primary School	Boggabri	Gunnedah	K–6	Co-ed	Systemic	1911
Sacred Heart Catholic Primary School	Broken Hill	City of Broken Hill	K–6	Co-ed	Systemic	1988
Sacred Heart Catholic Primary School	Cabramatta	Fairfield	K–6	Co-ed	Systemic	193
Sacred Heart Catholic Primary School	Coolah	Warrumbungle Shire	K–6	Co-ed	Systemic	1921
Sacred Heart Catholic Primary School, Kooringal	Wagga Wagga	Wagga Wagga	K–6	Co-ed	Systemic	????
Sacred Heart Catholic Primary School	Matraville	Randwick	K–6	Co-ed	Systemic	1949
Sacred Heart Catholic Primary School	Mona Vale	Northern Beaches	K–6	Co-ed	Systemic	1960
Sacred Heart Catholic Primary School	Mosman	Mosman	K–6	Co-ed	Systemic	1900
Sacred Heart Catholic Primary School	Mount Druitt South	Blacktown	K–6	Co-ed	Systemic	1983
Sacred Heart Catholic Primary School	Pymble	Ku-ring-gai	K–6	Co-ed	Systemic	1983
Sacred Heart Catholic Primary School	Tocumwal	Berrigan Shire	K–6	Co-ed	Systemic	1906
Sacred Heart Catholic Primary School	Villawood	Fairfield	K–6	Co-ed	Systemic	1965
Sacred Heart Catholic Primary School	Westmead	Cumberland	K–6	Co-ed	Systemic	1956
Sts Peter and Paul Catholic Primary School	Kiama	Kiama	K–6	Co-ed	Systemic	1908
Sts Peter and Paul's Primary School	Goulburn	Goulburn Mulwaree	K–6	Co-ed	Systemic	1986
St Agatha's Catholic Primary School	Pennant Hills	Hornsby	K–6	Co-ed	Systemic	1954
St Agnes' Catholic Primary School	Port Macquarie	Port Macquarie-Hastings	K–6	Co-ed	Systemic	1982
St Aidan's Catholic Primary School	Maroubra Junction	Randwick	K–6	Co-ed	Systemic	1915
St Aidan's Catholic Primary School	Rooty Hill	Blacktown	K–6	Co-ed	Systemic	1907
St Aloysius' Catholic Primary School	Chisholm	Maitland	K–6	Co-ed	Systemic	2015
St Aloysius' Catholic Primary School	Cronulla	Sutherland	K–6	Co-ed	Systemic	1917
St Ambrose Catholic Primary School	Concord West	Canada Bay	K–6	Co-ed	Systemic	1924
St Ambrose Catholic Primary School	Pottsville	Tweed Shire	K–6	Co-ed	Systemic	2015
St Andrew's Catholic Primary School	Malabar	Randwick	K–6	Co-ed	Systemic	1916
St Andrews Catholic Primary School	Marayong	Blacktown	K–6	Co-ed	Systemic	1963
St Angela's Primary School	Castle Hill	The Hills	K–6	Co-ed	Systemic	2001
St Anne's Catholic Primary School, North Albury	Lavington	Albury	K–6	Co-ed	Systemic	1958
St Anne's Catholic Primary School	Strathfield South	Strathfield	K–6	Co-ed	Systemic	1957
St Anthony's Catholic Primary School	Clovelly	Randwick	K–6	Co-ed	Systemic	1918
St Anthony's Catholic Primary School	Girraween	Cumberland	K–6	Co-ed	Systemic	1950
St Anthony's Catholic Primary School	Kingscliff	Tweed Shire	K–6	Co-ed	Systemic	1968
St Anthony's Catholic Primary School	Marsfield	Ryde	K–6	Co-ed	Systemic	1936
St Anthony's Catholic Primary School	Picton	Wollondilly Shire	K–6	Co-ed	Systemic	1880
St Augustine's Parish Primary School	Narromine	Narromine Shire	K–6	Co-ed	Systemic	1904
St Augustine's Primary School	Coffs Harbour	Coffs Harbour	K–6	Co-ed	Systemic	1913
St Bede's Primary School	Braidwood	Queanbeyan–Palerang	K–6	Co-ed	Systemic	1859
St Benedict's Primary School	Edgeworth	Lake Macquarie	K–6	Co-ed	Systemic	1962
St Bernadette's Primary School	Castle Hill	The Hills	K–6	Co-ed	Systemic	1956
St Bernadette's Primary School	Dundas Valley	Parramatta	K–6	Co-ed	Systemic	1958
St Bernadette's Primary School	Lalor Park	Blacktown	K–6	Co-ed	Systemic	1960
St Bernard's Catholic Primary School, Batemans Bay	Batehaven	Eurobodalla	K–6	Co-ed	Systemic	1982
St Bernard's Catholic Primary School	Berowra Heights	Hornsby	K–6	Co-ed	Systemic	1971
St Bernard's Catholic Primary School	Botany	Bayside	K–6	Co-ed	Systemic	1885
St Brendan's Catholic Primary School	Annandale	Inner West	K–6	Co-ed	Systemic	1888
St Brendan's Catholic Primary School	Bankstown	Canterbury-Bankstown	K–6	Co-ed	Systemic	1952
St Brendan's Catholic Primary School	Ganmain	Coolamon Shire	K–6	Co-ed	Systemic	1906
St Brendan's Catholic Primary School	Lake Munmorah	Central Coast	K–6	Co-ed	Systemic	1989
St Brigid's Catholic Primary School	Coogee	Randwick	K–6	Co-ed	Systemic	1923
St Brigid's Catholic Primary School	Coonamble	Coonamble Shire	K–6	Co-ed	Systemic	1883
St Brigid's Catholic Primary School	Gwynneville	Wollongong	K–6	Co-ed	Systemic	1951
St Brigid's Catholic Primary School	Kyogle	Kyogle Council	K–6	Co-ed	Systemic	1914
St Brigid's Catholic Primary School	Marrickville	Inner West	K–6	Co-ed	Systemic	1887
St Brigid's Catholic Primary School	Raymond Terrace	Port Stephens	K–6	Co-ed	Systemic	1890
St Canice's Primary School	Katoomba	Blue Mountains	K–6	Co-ed	Systemic	1901
St Carthage's Primary School	Lismore	Lismore	K–6	Co-ed	Systemic	1886
St Catherine Labouré Primary School	Gymea	Sutherland	K–6	Co-ed	Systemic	1954
St Catherine of Siena Primary School	Prestons	Liverpool	K–6	Co-ed	Systemic	1999
St Cecilia's Catholic Primary School	Balgowlah	Northern Beaches	K–6	Co-ed	Systemic	1930
St Cecilia's Catholic Primary School	Wyong	Central Coast	K–6	Co-ed	Systemic	1916
St Charles' Catholic Primary School	Ryde	Ryde	K–6	Co-ed	Systemic	1858
St Charles' Catholic Primary School	Waverley	Waverley	K–6	Co-ed	Systemic	1854
St Christopher's Catholic Primary School	Holsworthy	Liverpool	K–6	Co-ed	Systemic	2002
St Christopher's Catholic Primary School	Panania	Canterbury-Bankstown	K–6	Co-ed	Systemic	1955
St Clare's Catholic Primary School	Narellan Vale	Camden	K–6	Co-ed	Systemic	1994
St Columba's Catholic Primary School	Adamstown	Newcastle	K–6	Co-ed	Systemic	1890s
St Columba's Catholic Primary School	Leichhardt North	Inner West	K–6	Co-ed	Systemic	1898
St Columba's Catholic Primary School	Yeoval	Cabonne Council	K–6	Co-ed	Systemic	????
St Columban's Primary School	Mayfield	Newcastle	K–6	Co-ed	Systemic	1917
St Columbkille's Catholic Parish Primary School	Corrimal	Wollongong	K–6	Co-ed	Systemic	1905
St Declan's Primary School	Penshurst	Georges River	K–6	Co-ed	Systemic	1907
St Dominic Savio School	Rockdale	Bayside	K–6	Co-ed	Society of St. Pius X	1984
St Edward's Primary School	Canowindra	Cabonne Council	K–6	Co-ed	Systemic	????
St Edward's Primary School	South Tamworth	Tamworth	K–6	Co-ed	Systemic	1954
St Felix Catholic Primary School	Bankstown	Canterbury-Bankstown	K–6	Co-ed	Systemic	1886
St Fiacre's Primary School	Leichhardt	Inner West	K–6	Co-ed	Systemic	1894
St Finbar's Primary School	Glenbrook	Blue Mountains	K–6	Co-ed	Systemic	1954
St Finbar's Primary School	Sans Souci	Bayside	K–6	Co-ed	Systemic	1926
St Finbarr's Primary School	Byron Bay	Byron	K–6	Co-ed	Systemic	1916
St Francis De Sales' Primary School	Woolooware	Sutherland	K–6	Co-ed	Systemic	1963
St Francis of Assisi Catholic Primary School	Warrawong	Wollongong	K–6	Co-ed	Systemic	1960
St Francis of Assisi Primary School	Glendenning	Blacktown	K–6	Co-ed	Systemic	1991
St Francis of Assisi Regional Primary School	Paddington	Sydney	K–6	Co-ed	Systemic	2000
St Francis Xavier Catholic Primary School, Ashbury	Croydon Park	Canterbury-Bankstown	K–6	Co-ed	Systemic	1930
St Francis Xavier Catholic Primary School	Ballina	Ballina	K–6	Co-ed	Systemic	1982
St Francis Xavier Catholic Primary School	Woolgoolga	Coffs Harbour	K–6	Co-ed	Systemic	1994
St Francis Xavier's Catholic Primary School	Arncliffe	Bayside	K–6	Co-ed	Systemic	1911
St Francis Xavier's Catholic Primary School	Belmont	Lake Macquarie	K–6	Co-ed	Systemic	1950
St Francis Xavier's Catholic Primary School	Lake Cargelligo	Lachlan Shire	K–6	Co-ed	Systemic	1929
St Francis Xavier's Catholic Primary School	Lurnea	Liverpool	K–6	Co-ed	Systemic	????
St Francis Xavier's Catholic Primary School	Narrabri	Narrabri Shire	K–6	Co-ed	Systemic	1882
St Gabriel's Catholic Primary School	Bexley	Bayside	K–6	Co-ed	Systemic	1939
St Gerard's Catholic Primary School	Carlingford	Parramatta	K–6	Co-ed	Systemic	1964
St Gertrude's Catholic Primary School	Smithfield	Fairfield	K–6	Co-ed	Systemic	1952
St Gregory's Primary School	Queanbeyan	Queanbeyan–Palerang	K–6	Co-ed	Systemic	1850
St Ignatius' Primary School	Bourke	Bourke Shire	K–6	Co-ed	Systemic	1870s
St James' Primary School	Banora Point	Tweed Shire	K–6	Co-ed	Systemic	1917
St James' Primary School	Glebe	Sydney	K–6	Co-ed	Systemic	1880
St James' Primary School	Kotara South	Lake Macquarie	K–6	Co-ed	Systemic	1961
St James' Primary School	Muswellbrook	Muswellbrook Shire	K–6	Co-ed	Systemic	1862
St James' Primary School	Yamba	Clarence Valley Council	K–6	Co-ed	Systemic	1997
St Jerome's School	Punchbowl	Canterbury-Bankstown	K–6	Co-ed	Systemic	1933
St Joachim's Catholic Primary School	Lidcombe	Cumberland	K–6	Co-ed	Systemic	1885
St Joan of Arc Catholic Primary School	Haberfield	Inner West	K–6	Co-ed	Systemic	1910
St John Bosco Catholic Primary School	Engadine	Sutherland	K–6	Co-ed	Systemic	1959
St John Fisher Catholic Primary School	Tumbi Umbi	Central Coast	K–6	Co-ed	Systemic	1988
St John The Apostle Catholic Primary School	Narraweena	Northern Beaches	K–6	Co-ed	Systemic	1962
St John The Baptist Catholic Primary School	Freshwater	Northern Beaches	K–6	Co-ed	Systemic	1921
St John The Baptist Catholic Primary School	Woy Woy South	Central Coast	K–6	Co-ed	Systemic	1922
St John The Baptist Primary School	Maitland	Maitland	K–6	Co-ed	Systemic	1856
St John The Evangelist Catholic Primary School	Campbelltown	Campbelltown	K–6	Co-ed	Systemic	1849
St John Vianney's Primary School	Doonside	Blacktown	K–6	Co-ed	Systemic	1986
St John Vianney's Primary School	Greenacre	Canterbury-Bankstown	K–6	Co-ed	Systemic	1961
St John Vianney's Primary School	Morisset	Lake Macquarie	K–6	Co-ed	Systemic	1962
St John's Catholic Primary School	Auburn	Cumberland	K–6	Co-ed	Systemic	1893
St John's Catholic Primary School	Baradine	Warrumbungle Shire	K–6	Co-ed	Systemic	1926
St John's Catholic Primary School	Cobar	Cobar Shire	K–6	Co-ed	Systemic	1884
St John's Catholic Primary School	Dapto	Wollongong	K–6	Co-ed	Systemic	1839
St John's Catholic Primary School	Dubbo	Dubbo	K–6	Co-ed	Systemic	1969
St John's Catholic Primary School	Lambton	Newcastle	K–6	Co-ed	Systemic	1883
St John's Catholic Primary School	Mullumbimby	Byron	K–6	Co-ed	Systemic	1910
St John's Catholic Primary School	Riverstone	Blacktown	K–6	Co-ed	Systemic	1950
St John's Catholic Primary School	Trangie	Narromine Shire	K–6	Co-ed	Systemic	1914
St Joseph The Worker School	Auburn	Cumberland	K–6	Co-ed	Systemic	1962
St Joseph's Catholic Primary School	Adelong	Snowy Valleys Council	K–6	Co-ed	Systemic	1884
St Joseph's Catholic Primary School	Alstonville	Ballina	K–6	Co-ed	Systemic	1919
St Joseph's Catholic Primary School	Balranald	Balranald Shire	K–6	Co-ed	Systemic	????
St Joseph's Catholic Primary School	Barraba	Tamworth	K–6	Co-ed	Systemic	1910
St Joseph's Catholic Primary School	Belmore	Canterbury-Bankstown	K–6	Co-ed	Systemic	1921
St Joseph's Catholic Primary School (formerly St Joseph's Central School)	Blayney	Blayney Shire	K–6	Co-ed	Systemic	1881
St Joseph's Catholic Primary School	Bombala	Snowy Monaro	K–6	Co-ed	Systemic	1888
St Joseph's Catholic Primary School	Boorowa	Hilltops Council	K–6	Co-ed	Systemic	1858
St Joseph's Catholic Primary School	Bulahdelah	MidCoast Council	K–6	Co-ed	Systemic	1955
St Joseph's Catholic Primary School	Bulli	Wollongong	K–6	Co-ed	Systemic	1882
St Joseph's Catholic Primary School	Charlestown	Lake Macquarie	K—6	Co-ed	Systemic	1927
St Joseph's Catholic Primary School	Como	Sutherland	K–6	Co-ed	Systemic	1953
St Joseph's Catholic Primary School	Condobolin	Lachlan Shire	K–6	Co-ed	Systemic	????
St Joseph's Catholic Primary School	Coraki	Richmond Valley	K–6	Co-ed	Systemic	1896
St Joseph's Catholic Primary School	Culcairn	Greater Hume	K–6	Co-ed	Systemic	????
St Joseph's Catholic Primary School	Denman	Muswellbrook Shire	K–6	Co-ed	Systemic	1901
St Joseph's Catholix Primary School	Dungog	Dungog Shire	K–6	Co-ed	Systemic	1888
St Joseph's Catholic Primary School	East Maitland	Maitland	K–6	Co-ed	Systemic	1885
St Joseph's Catholic Primary School	Enfield	Burwood	K–6	Co-ed	Systemic	1917
St Joseph's Catholic Primary School	Eugowra	Forbes Shire	K–6	Co-ed	Systemic	????
St Joseph's Catholic Primary School	Finley	Berrigan Shire	K–6	Co-ed	Systemic	1915
St Joseph's Catholic Primary School	Gilgandra	Gilgandra Shire	K–6	Co-ed	Systemic	2009
St Joseph's Catholic Primary School	Glen Innes	Glen Innes Severn	K–6	Co-ed	Systemic	1884
St Joseph's Catholic Primary School	Gloucester	MidCoast Council	K–6	Co-ed	Systemic	1919
St Joseph's Catholic Primary School	Goulburn	Goulburn Mulwaree	K–6	Co-ed	Systemic	1885
St Joseph's Catholic Primary School	Grenfell	Weddin Shire	K–6	Co-ed	Systemic	1876
St Joseph's Catholic Primary School	Hillston	Carrathool Shire	K–6	Co-ed	Systemic	1892
St Joseph's Catholic Primary School	Jerilderie	Murrumbidgee	K–6	Co-ed	Systemic	1882
St Joseph's Catholic Primary School	Junee	Junee Shire	K–6	Co-ed	Systemic	1889
St Joseph's Catholic Primary School	Kilaben Bay	Lake Macquarie	K–6	Co-ed	Systemic	1950
St Joseph's Catholic Primary School	Kingswood	Penrith	K–6	Co-ed	Systemic	1963
St Joseph's Catholic Primary School	Laurieton	Port Macquarie-Hastings	K–6	Co-ed	Systemic	1952
St Joseph's Catholic Primary School	Leeton	Leeton Shire	K–6	Co-ed	Systemic	1917
St Joseph's Catholic Primary School	Lockhart	Lockhart Shire	K—6	Co-ed	Systemic	1908
St Joseph's Catholic Primary School	Maclean	Clarence Valley Council	K–6	Co-ed	Systemic	1898
St Joseph's Catholic Primary School	Manildra	Cabonne Council	K–6	Co-ed	Systemic	1928
St Joseph's Catholic Primary School	Merewether	Newcastle	K–6	Co-ed	Systemic	1885
St Joseph's Catholic Primary School	Merriwa	Upper Hunter Shire	K–6	Co-ed	Systemic	1883
St Joseph's Catholic Primary School	Molong	Cabonne Council	K–6	Co-ed	Systemic	1881
St Joseph's Catholic Primary School	Moorebank	Liverpool	K–6	Co-ed	Systemic	1973
St Joseph's Catholic Primary School	Mungindi	Moree Plains Shire	K–6	Co-ed	Systemic	1924
St Joseph's Catholic Primary School	Narrabeen	Northern Beaches	K–6	Co-ed	Systemic	1939
St Joseph's Catholic Primary School	Narrandera	Narrandera Shire	K–6	Co-ed	Systemic	1890
St Joseph's Catholic Primary School	Nyngan	Bogan Shire	K–6	Co-ed	Systemic	1884
St Joseph's Catholic Primary School	Oatley	Georges River	K–6	Co-ed	Systemic	1953
St Joseph's Catholic Primary School	Oberon	Oberon Council	K–6	Co-ed	Systemic	1912
St Joseph's Catholic Primary School	Peak Hill	Parkes Shire	K–6	Co-ed	Systemic	1895
St Joseph's Catholic Primary School	Portland	Lithgow	K–6	Co-ed	Systemic	1905
St Joseph's Catholic Primary School	Port Macquarie	Port Macquarie-Hastings	K–6	Co-ed	Systemic	1913
St Joseph's Catholic Primary School	Quirindi	Liverpool Plains Shire	K–6	Co-ed	Systemic	1885
St Joseph's Catholic Primary School	Riverwood	Georges River	K–6	Co-ed	Systemic	1949
St Joseph's Catholic Primary School	Rockdale	Bayside	K–6	Co-ed	Systemic	late 1800s
St Joseph's Catholic Primary School	Rosebery	Bayside	K–6	Co-ed	Systemic	2023
St Joseph's Catholic Primary School	Schofields	Blacktown	K–6	Co-ed	Systemic	1997
St Joseph's Catholic Primary School	South Grafton	Clarence Valley Council	K–6	Co-ed	Systemic	1889
St Joseph's Catholic Primary School	South Murwillumbah	Tweed Shire	K–6	Co-ed	Systemic	1970
St Joseph's Catholic Primary School	Taree	MidCoast Council	K–6	Co-ed	Systemic	????
St Joseph's Catholic Primary School	Tenterfield	Tenterfield Shire	K–6	Co-ed	Systemic	1880
St Joseph's Catholic Primary School	Tweed Heads	Tweed Shire	K–6	Co-ed	Systemic	1917
St Joseph's Catholic Primary School	Uralla	Uralla Shire	K–6	Co-ed	Systemic	1886
St Joseph's Catholic Primary School	Wagga Wagga	Wagga Wagga	K–6	Co-ed	Systemic	1859
St Joseph's Catholic Primary School	Walgett	Walgett Shire	K–6	Co-ed	Systemic	1896
St Joseph's Catholic Primary School	Warialda	Gwydir Shire	K–6	Co-ed	Systemic	1904
St Joseph's Catholic Primary School	Wauchope	Port Macquarie-Hastings	K–6	Co-ed	Systemic	1928
St Joseph's Catholic Primary School	Wee Waa	Narrabri Shire	K–6	Co-ed	Systemic	1909
St Joseph's Catholic Primary School	West Kempsey	Kempsey	K–6	Co-ed	Systemic	1884
St Joseph's Catholic Primary School	West Tamworth	Tamworth	K–6	Co-ed	Systemic	1919
St Joseph's Catholic Primary School	Wingham	MidCoast Council	K–6	Co-ed	Systemic	1901
St Joseph's Catholic Primary School	Woodburn	Richmond Valley	K–6	Co-ed	Systemic	1912
St Justin's Catholic Primary School	Oran Park	Camden	K–6	Co-ed	Systemic	2012
St Kevin's Catholic Primary School	Cardiff	Lake Macquarie	K–6	Co-ed	Systemic	1917
St Kevin's Catholic Primary School	Dee Why	Northern Beaches	K–6	Co-ed	Systemic	1935
St Kevin's Primary School	Eastwood	Ryde	K–6	Co-ed	Systemic	1925
St Kieran's Catholic Primary School	Manly Vale	Northern Beaches	K–6	Co-ed	Systemic	1953
St Lawrence's Primary School (formerly St Lawrence's Central School)	Coonabarabran	Warrumbungle Shire	K–6	Co-ed	Systemic	????
St Laurence's Primary School	Dubbo	Dubbo	K–6	Co-ed	Systemic	1953
St Laurence's Primary School	Forbes	Forbes Shire	K–6	Co-ed	Systemic	1989
St Luke's Catholic Primary School	Revesby	Canterbury-Bankstown	K–6	Co-ed	Systemic	1950
St Madeleine's Primary School	Kenthurst	The Hills	K–6	Co-ed	Systemic	1987
St Margaret Mary's Primary School	Merrylands	Cumberland	K–6	Co-ed	Systemic	1941
St Margaret Mary's Primary School	Randwick North	Randwick	K–6	Co-ed	Systemic	1956
St Mark's Catholic Primary School	Drummoyne	Canada Bay	K–6	Co-ed	Systemic	1889
St Martha's Catholic Primary School	Strathfield	Strathfield	K–6	Co-ed	Systemic	1925
St Martin's Catholic Primary School	Davidson	Northern Beaches	K–6	Co-ed	Systemic	1980
St Mary – St Joseph Catholic Primary School	Maroubra	Randwick	K–6	Co-ed	Systemic	1970
St Mary MacKillop Primary School	South Penrith	Penrith	K–6	Co-ed	Systemic	1983
St Mary of the Angels Primary School	Guyra	Armidale	K–6	Co-ed	Systemic	1919
St Mary's Catholic Primary School	Armidale	Armidale	K–6	Co-ed	Systemic	1849
St Mary's Catholic Primary School	Batlow	Snowy Valleys Council	K–6	Co-ed	Systemic	????
St Mary's Catholic Primary School	Bellingen	Bellingen Shire	K–6	Co-ed	Systemic	1911
St Mary's Catholic Primary School	Bowraville	Nambucca Valley	K–6	Co-ed	Systemic	1906
St Mary's Catholic Primary School	Casino	Richmond Valley	K–6	Co-ed	Systemic	1884
St Mary's Catholic Primary School	Concord	Canada Bay	K–6	Co-ed	Systemic	1953
St Mary's Catholic Primary School	Corowa	Federation Council	K–6	Co-ed	Systemic	1883
St Mary's Catholic Primary School	Crookwell	King County	K–6	Co-ed	Systemic	1903
St Mary's Catholic Primary School	Dubbo	Dubbo	K–6	Co-ed	Systemic	1910
St Mary's Catholic Primary School	Erskineville	Sydney	K–6	Co-ed	Systemic	1913
St Mary's Catholic Primary School	Georges Hall	Canterbury-Bankstown	K–6	Co-ed	Systemic	1979
St Mary's Catholic Primary School	Grafton	Clarence Valley Council	K–6	Co-ed	Systemic	1868
St Mary's Catholic Primary School	Hay	Hay Shire	K–6	Co-ed	Systemic	1883
St Mary's Catholic Primary School	Manly	Northern Beaches	K–6	Co-ed	Systemic	1881
St Mary's Catholic Primary School	Moruya	Eurobodalla	K–6	Co-ed	Systemic	1847
St Mary's Catholic Primary School	Noraville	Central Coast	K–6	Co-ed	Systemic	1973
St Mary's Catholic Primary School	Orange	Orange	K–6	Co-ed	Systemic	1988
St Mary's Catholic Primary School	Rydalmere	Parramatta	K–6	Co-ed	Systemic	1890
St Mary's Catholic Primary School	Scone	Upper Hunter Shire	K–6	Co-ed	Systemic	1887
St Mary's Catholic Primary School	Warners Bay	Lake Macquarie	K–6	Co-ed	Systemic	1958
St Mary's Catholic Primary School	Warren	Warren Shire	K–6	Co-ed	Systemic	1897
St Mary's Catholic Primary School	Yoogali	Griffith	K–6	Co-ed	Systemic	1949
St Mary's Catholic Primary School	Young	Hilltops Council	K–6	Co-ed	Systemic	????
St Mary's Star of the Sea Catholic Primary School	Hurstville	Georges River	K–6	Co-ed	Systemic	1886
St Mary's Star of the Sea Catholic Primary School	Milton	Shoalhaven	K–6	Co-ed	Systemic	1913
St Mary's War Memorial School	West Wyalong	Bland Shire	K–6	Co-ed	Systemic	1897
St Matthew's Primary School	Windsor	Hawkesbury	K–6	Co-ed	Systemic	1832
St Mel's Catholic Primary School	Campsie	Canterbury-Bankstown	K–6	Co-ed	Systemic	1894
St Michael's Catholic Primary School	Baulkham Hills	The Hills	K–6	Co-ed	Systemic	1971
St Michael's Catholic Primary School	Belfield	Canterbury-Bankstown	K–6	Co-ed	Systemic	1959
St Michael's Catholic Primary School	Blacktown South	Blacktown	K–6	Co-ed	Systemic	1962
St Michael's Catholic Primary School	Coolamon	Coolamon Shire	K–6	Co-ed	Systemic	1896
St Michael's Catholic Primary School	Daceyville	Bayside	K–6	Co-ed	Systemic	1914
St Michael's Catholic Primary School	Deniliquin	Edward River Council	K–6	Co-ed	Systemic	1887
St Michael's Catholic Primary School	Dunedoo	Warrumbungle Shire	K–6	Co-ed	Systemic	????
St Michael's Catholic Primary School	Lane Cove	Lane Cove	K–6	Co-ed	Systemic	1922
St Michael's Catholic Primary School	Manilla	Tamworth	K–6	Co-ed	Systemic	1904
St Michael's Catholic Primary School	Meadowbank	Ryde	K–6	Co-ed	Systemic	1922
St Michael's Catholic Primary School	Mittagong	Wingecarribee Shire	K–6	Co-ed	Systemic	1891
St Michael's Catholic Primary School	Nelson Bay	Port Stephens Council	K–6	Co-ed	Systemic	1962
St Michael's Catholic Primary School	Nowra	Shoalhaven	K–6	Co-ed	Systemic	1893
St Michael's Catholic Primary School	Stanmore	Inner West	K–6	Co-ed	Systemic	1912
St Michael's Catholic Primary School	Thirroul	Wollongong	K–6	Co-ed	Systemic	1940
St Monica's Primary School	North Parramatta	Parramatta	K–6	Co-ed	Systemic	1892
St Monica's Primary School	Richmond	Hawkesbury	K–6	Co-ed	Systemic	1859
St Nicholas of Myra Primary School	Penrith	Penrith	K–6	Co-ed	Systemic	1852
St Nicholas' Primary School	Tamworth	Tamworth	K–6	Co-ed	Systemic	1980
St Oliver's Primary School	Harris Park	Parramatta	K–6	Co-ed	Systemic	1930
St Patrick's Catholic Primary School	Albury	Albury	K–6	Co-ed	Systemic	1978
St Patrick's Catholic Primary School	Asquith	Hornsby	K–6	Co-ed	Systemic	1958
St Patrick's Catholic Primary School	Bega	Bega Valley Shire	K–6	Co-ed	Systemic	1872
St Patrick's Catholic Primary School	Blacktown	Blacktown	K–6	Co-ed	Systemic	1919
St Patrick's Catholic Primary School	Brewarrina	Brewarrina Shire	K–6	Co-ed	Systemic	1894
St Patrick's Catholic Primary School	Cessnock	Cessnock	K–6	Co-ed	Systemic	1887
St Patrick's Catholic Primary School	East Gosford	Central Coast	K–6	Co-ed	Systemic	1960
St Patrick's Catholic Primary School	Griffith	Griffith	K–6	Co-ed	Systemic	1921
St Patrick's Catholic Primary School	Guildford	Cumberland	K–6	Co-ed	Systemic	1910
St Patrick's Catholic Primary School	Gundagai	Cootamundra–Gundagai	K–6	Co-ed	Systemic	1876
St Patrick's Catholic Primary School	Holbrook	Greater Hume	K–6	Co-ed	Systemic	1877
St Patrick's Catholic Primary School	Kogarah	Georges River	K–6	Co-ed	Systemic	1862
St Patrick's Catholic Primary School	Lithgow	Lithgow	K–6	Co-ed	Systemic	1880
St Patrick's Catholic Primary School	Lochinvar	Maitland	K–6	Co-ed	Systemic	1865
St Patrick's Catholic Primary School	Macksville	Nambucca Valley Council	K–6	Co-ed	Systemic	1918
St Patrick's Catholic Primary School	Mortlake	Canada Bay	K–6	Co-ed	Systemic	2017
St Patrick's Catholic Primary School	Parramatta	Parramatta	K–6	Co-ed	Systemic	1820
St Patrick's Catholic Primary School	Port Kembla	Wollongong	K–6	Co-ed	Systemic	1918
St Patrick's Catholic Primary School	Summer Hill	Inner West	K–6	Co-ed	Systemic	1949
St Patrick's Catholic Primary School	Sutherland	Sutherland	K–6	Co-ed	Systemic	1956
St Patrick's Catholic Primary School	Swansea	Lake Macquarie	K–6	Co-ed	Systemic	1952
St Patrick's Catholic Primary School	Trundle	Parkes Shire	K–6	Co-ed	Systemic	1928
St Patrick's Catholic Primary School	Walcha	Walcha Shire	K–6	Co-ed	Systemic	1911
St Patrick's Catholic Primary School	Wallsend	Newcastle	K–6	Co-ed	Systemic	1883
St Paul of The Cross School	Dulwich Hill	Inner West	K–6	Co-ed	Systemic	1908
St Paul The Apostle Primary School	Winston Hills	Parramatta	K–6	Co-ed	Systemic	1973
St Paul's Catholic Primary School	Albion Park	Shellharbour	K–6	Co-ed	Systemic	1883
St Paul's Catholic Primary School	Camden	Camden	K–6	Co-ed	Systemic	1883
St Paul's Catholic Primary School	Moss Vale	Wingecarribee	K–6	Co-ed	Systemic	1948
St Paul's Primary School	Gateshead	Newcastle	K–6	Co-ed	Systemic	1964
St Paul's Primary School	Rutherford	Maitland	K–6	Co-ed	Systemic	1957
St Peter Chanel Primary School	Regents Park	Cumberland	K–6	Co-ed	Systemic	1924
St Peter's Primary School	Coleambally	Murrumbidgee Council	K–6	Co-ed	Systemic	1970
St Peter's Primary School	Port Macquarie	Port Macquarie-Hastings	K–6	Co-ed	Systemic	1993
St Peter's Primary School	Stockton	Newcastle	K–6	Co-ed	Systemic	1887
St Philip Neri Catholic Primary School (formerly known as St Ciaran's)	Northbridge	Willoughby	K–6	Co-ed	Systemic	1926
St Philomena's Catholic Primary School	South Bathurst	Bathurst	K–6	Co-ed	Systemic	1901
St Pius X Catholic Primary School	Unanderra	Wollongong	K–6	Co-ed	Systemic	1960
St Pius X Primary School	Dubbo	Dubbo	K–6	Co-ed	Systemic	1973
St Pius X Primary School	Windale	Lake Macquarie	K–6	Co-ed	Systemic	1955
St Pius' Primary School	Enmore	Inner West	K–6	Co-ed	Systemic	1907
St Raphael's Catholic Primary School	South Hurstville	Georges River	K–6	Co-ed	Systemic	1929
St Rose Catholic Primary School	Collaroy Plateau	Northern Beaches	K–6	Co-ed	Systemic	1973
St Therese Catholic Primary School	Mascot	Bayside	K–6	Co-ed	Systemic	1940
St Therese Catholic Primary School	Padstow	Canterbury-Bankstown	K–6	Co-ed	Systemic	1963
St Therese Catholic Primary School	Sadleir	Liverpool	K–6	Co-ed	Systemic	1967
St Therese's Catholic Primary School	Denistone	Ryde	K–6	Co-ed	Systemic	1951
St Therese's Catholic Primary School	Lakemba	Canterbury-Bankstown	K–6	Co-ed	Systemic	1926
St Therese's Catholic Primary School	New Lambton	Newcastle	K–6	Co-ed	Systemic	1925
St Therese's Catholic Primary School Mangerton	West Wollongong	Wollongong	K–6	Co-ed	Systemic	1939
St Therese's Community Primary School (formerly St Therese's Mission School)	Wilcannia	Central Darling Shire	K–6	Co-ed	Systemic	1966
St Thomas Aquinas Catholic Primary School	Bowral	Wingecarribee	K–6	Co-ed	Systemic	1903
St Thomas Aquinas Primary School	Springwood	Blue Mountains	K–6	Co-ed	Systemic	1921
St Thomas More Catholic Primary School	Campbelltown	Campbelltown	K–6	Co-ed	Systemic	1978
St Thomas More's School	Brighton-Le-Sands	Bayside	K–6	Co-ed	Systemic	1938
St Thomas' Catholic Primary School	Willoughby	Willoughby	K–6	Co-ed	Systemic	1928
St Xavier's Primary School	Gunnedah	Gunnedah	K–6	Co-ed	Systemic	1879
Stella Maris Catholic Primary School	Shellharbour	Shellharbour	K–6	Co-ed	Systemic	1953
Trinity Catholic Primary School	Kemps Creek	Penrith	K–6	Co-ed	Systemic	1993
Trinity Catholic Primary School (merger of St Mary's School and St Columba's)	Murrumburrah	Hilltops Council	K–6	Co-ed	Systemic	1980
Villa Maria Primary School	Hunters Hill	Hunters Hill	K–6	Co-ed	Systemic	1907

== Catholic high and K–12 schools ==
School	Suburb or town	LGA	Years	M/F/co-ed	Category	Founded
All Saints Catholic College	Liverpool	Liverpool	K-12	Co-ed	Systemic	1834
All Saints College	Maitland	Maitland	7–12	Co-ed	Systemic	1992
Aquinas Catholic College	Menai	Sutherland	7–12	Co-ed	Systemic	1993
Bede Polding College	South Windsor	Hawkesbury	7–12	Co-ed	Systemic	1986
Bethany College	Hurstville	Georges River	7–12	F	Systemic	1993
Brigidine College Randwick	Randwick	Randwick	7–12	F	Systemic	1901
Brigidine College, St Ives	St Ives	Ku-ring-gai	7–12	F	Brigidine Sisters	1954
Caroline Chisholm College (formerly Caroline Chisholm Catholic College)	Glenmore Park	Penrith	7–12	F	Systemic	1974
Carroll College	Broulee	Eurobodalla	7–12	Co-ed	Systemic	1995
Casimir Catholic College	Marrickville	Inner West	7–12	Co-ed	Systemic	1983
Catherine McAuley Catholic College	Medowie	Port Stephens Council	7–12	Co-ed	Systemic	2021
Catherine McAuley Westmead	Westmead	Parramatta	7–12	F	Systemic	1966
Cathwest Innovation College (Formerly Loyola Senior High School)	Mount Druitt	Blacktown	10–12	Co-ed	Systemic	
Cerdon College	Merrylands	Cumberland	7–12	F	Systemic	1960
Chevalier College	Burradoo	Wingecarribee	7–12	Co-ed	Missionaries of the Sacred Heart	1946
Christian Brothers' High School, Lewisham	Lewisham	Inner West	5–12	M	Christian Brothers	1891
Clancy Catholic College	West Hoxton	Liverpool	7–12	Co-ed	Systemic	2006
Corpus Christi Catholic High School	Oak Flats	Shellharbour	7–12	Co-ed	Systemic	2006
Corpus Christi College (formerly Champagnat College Pagewood)	Maroubra	Randwick	7–12	Co-ed	Systemic	1961
De La Salle College, Caringbah	Caringbah	Sutherland	7–12	M	Systemic	1958
De La Salle College, Revesby Heights	Revesby Heights	Canterbury-Bankstown	7–12	M	Systemic	1960
Delany College	Granville	Cumberland	7–12	Co-ed	Systemic	1997
Domremy College	Five Dock	Canada Bay	7–12	F	Systemic	1911
Edmund Rice College	West Wollongong	Wollongong	7–12	M	Christian Brothers	1926
Emmaus Catholic College	Kemps Creek	Penrith	7–12	Co-ed	Systemic	1988
Freeman Catholic College	Bonnyrigg Heights	Fairfield	7–12	Co-ed	Systemic	1985
Gilroy Catholic College	Castle Hill	The Hills	7–12	Co-ed	Systemic	1980
Good Samaritan Catholic College	Hinchinbrook	Liverpool	7–12	Co-ed	Systemic	1999
Hartford College	Daceyville	Bayside	5–12	M	Independent	2023
Hennessy Catholic College	Young	Hilltops Council	7–12	Co-ed	Systemic	1919
Holy Cross College, Ryde	Ryde	Ryde	7–12	M	Systemic	1891
Holy Spirit College	Bellambi	Wollongong	7–12	Co-ed	Systemic	1983
Holy Spirit College	Lakemba	Canterbury-Bankstown	7–12	Co-ed	Systemic	1954
Holy Trinity School	Inverell	Inverell Shire	K–10	Co-ed	Systemic	1963
James Sheahan Catholic High School	Orange	Orange	7–12	Co-ed	Systemic	1980
John Therry Catholic High School	Rosemeadow	Campbelltown	7–12	Co-ed	Systemic	1981
Kildare Catholic College	Wagga Wagga	Wagga Wagga	7–12	Co-ed	Systemic	2004
Kincoppal–Rose Bay School of the Sacred Heart	Rose Bay	Woollahra	K–12	Co-ed & F	Society of the Sacred Heart	1971
La Salle Academy	Lithgow	Lithgow	7–12	Co-ed	Systemic	1953
LaSalle Catholic College, Bankstown	Bankstown	Canterbury-Bankstown	7–12	Co-ed	Systemic	1951
Loreto Kirribilli	Kirribilli	North Sydney	K–12	F	Loreto	1901
Loreto Normanhurst	Normanhurst	Hornsby	5–12	F	Loreto	1897
Lumen Christi Catholic College	Pambula Beach	Bega Valley Shire	K–12	Co-ed	Systemic	2001
MacKillop Catholic College	Warnervale	Central Coast	K–12	Co-ed	Systemic	2003
MacKillop College, Bathurst	Bathurst	Bathurst	7–12	F	Systemic	1967
MacKillop College (formerly a campus of St Joseph's High School)	Port Macquarie	Port Macquarie-Hastings	7–12	Co-ed	Systemic	1988
Magdalene Catholic College	Narellan	Camden	7–12	Co-ed	Systemic	1999
Marcellin College	Randwick	Randwick	7–12	M	Systemic	1923
Marian Catholic College (formerly Catholic High School)	Griffith	Griffith	7–12	Co-ed	Systemic	1970
Marian College	Kenthurst	The Hills	7–12	Co-ed	Systemic	1988
Marist College Eastwood	Eastwood	Ryde	7–12	M	Systemic	1937
Marist College Kogarah	Bexley	Bayside	7–12	M	Systemic	1909
Marist College North Shore	North Sydney	North Sydney	K–12	Co-ed	Systemic	1888
Marist College Penshurst	Mortdale	Georges River	7–12	Co-ed	Systemic	1953
Marist Sisters' College, Woolwich	Woolwich	Hunter's Hill	7–12	F	Systemic	1908
Maronite College of the Holy Family (formerly Our Lady of Lebanon College)	Harris Park	Parramatta	K–12	Co-ed	Maronite	1973
Mary MacKillop College	Wakeley	Fairfield	7–12	F	Systemic	1991
Mater Dei Catholic College	Wagga Wagga	Wagga Wagga	7–12	Co-ed	Systemic	2004
Mater Maria Catholic College	Warriewood	Northern Beaches	7–12	Co-ed	Systemic	1962
McAuley Catholic College	Tumut	Snowy Valleys Council	K–12	Co-ed	Systemic	1923
McAuley Catholic College	Clarenza	Clarence Valley Council	7–12	Co-ed	Systemic	2002
McCarthy Catholic College	West Tamworth	Tamworth	7–12	Co-ed	Systemic	2000
Mercy Catholic College	Chatswood	Willoughby	7–12	F	Systemic	1890
Monte Sant' Angelo Mercy College	North Sydney	North Sydney	7–12	F	Sisters of Mercy	1875
Montgrove College (formerly Orchard Hills Preparatory School)	Orchard Hills	Penrith	K–12	F & Co-ed	PARED	1999
Mount Carmel Catholic College	Varroville	Campbelltown	7–12	Co-ed	Systemic	1986
Mount St Benedict College	Pennant Hills	Hornsby	7–12	F	Sisters of the Good Samaritan	1966
Mount Saint Joseph, Milperra	Milperra	Canterbury-Bankstown	7–12	F	Systemic	1960
Mount Saint Patrick College	Murwillumbah	Tweed Shire	7–12	Co-ed	Systemic	1926
Nagle College	Blacktown	Blacktown	7–12	F	Systemic	1965
Newman Senior Technical College (formerly Australian Technical College – Port Macquarie)	Port Macquarie	Port Macquarie-Hastings	11–12	Co-ed	Systemic	1979
O'Connor Catholic College	Armidale	Armidale	7–12	Co-ed	Systemic	1975
Oakhill College	Rogans Hill	Hornsby	7–12	Co-ed	De La Salle Brothers	1937
Our Lady of Mercy College, Burraneer	Cronulla	Sutherland	7–12	F	Systemic	1932
Our Lady of Mercy College, Parramatta	Parramatta	Parramatta	7–12	F	Sisters of Mercy	1889
Our Lady of The Sacred Heart College	Kensington	Randwick	7–12	F	Systemic	1897
Parramatta Marist High School	Westmead	Parramatta	7–12	M	Systemic	1820
Patrician Brothers' College, Blacktown	Blacktown	Blacktown	7–12	M	Systemic	1952
Patrician Brothers' College, Fairfield	Fairfield	Fairfield	7–12	M	Systemic	1953
Penola Catholic College, Emu Plains (formerly McCarthy Catholic College)	Emu Plains	Penrith	7–12	Co-ed	Systemic	1986
Red Bend Catholic College	Forbes	Forbes Shire	7–12	Co-ed	Marist Brothers / Sisters of Mercy	1977
Redfield College	Dural	Hornsby	2–12	M	PARED	1986
Rosebank College	Five Dock	Canada Bay	7–12	Co-ed	Sisters of the Good Samaritan	1867
Sacred Heart Central School	Cootamundra	Cootamundra–Gundagai	K–10	Co-ed	Systemic	1870
San Clemente Catholic College	Mayfield	Newcastle	7–12	Co-ed	Systemic	1916
Santa Sabina College	Strathfield	Strathfield	K–12	Co-ed & F	Dominican	1894
Santa Sophia Catholic College, Gables	Schofields	Blacktown	K–12	Co-ed	Systemic	2018
Southern Cross Catholic Vocational College	Burwood	Burwood	10–12	Co-ed	Systemic	2010
St Agnes Catholic High School (formerly Christ Catholic College – St Agnes Campus)	Rooty Hill	Blacktown	7–12	Co-ed	Systemic	1962
St Aloysius' College	Milsons Point	North Sydney	3–12	M	Jesuit	1879
St Aloysius College, Cronulla (formerly De La Salle College Cronulla)	Cronulla	Sutherland	7–12	Co-ed	Systemic	1936
St Andrews College	Marayong	Blacktown	7–12	Co-ed	Systemic	1998
St Anne's Catholic College	Temora	Temora Shire	K–12	Co-ed	Systemic	1881
St Anthony of Padua Catholic College	Austral	Liverpool	K–12	Co-ed	Systemic	2017
St Augustine's College, Brookvale	Brookvale	Northern Beaches	5–12	M	Augustinian	1956
St Bede's Catholic College	Chisholm	Maitland	7–12	Co-ed	Systemic	2018
St Benedict's Catholic College	Oran Park	Camden	7–12	Co-ed	Systemic	2011
St Brigid's Catholic College	Lake Munmorah	Central Coast	7–12	Co-ed	Systemic	2014
St Catherine's Catholic College	Singleton	Singleton Council	K–12	Co-ed	Systemic	1875
St Charbel's College	Punchbowl	Canterbury-Bankstown	K–12	Co-ed	Maronite	1984
St Clare's Catholic High School (formerly Christ Catholic College – Clare Campus)	Hassall Grove	Blacktown	7–12	Co-ed	Systemic	1993
St Clare's College	Waverley	Waverley	7–12	F	Systemic	1884
St Clare's High School	Taree	Mid-Coast	7–12	Co-ed	Systemic	1971
St Columba's Catholic College (formerly St Columba's High School)	Springwood	Blue Mountains	7–12	Co-ed	Systemic	1979
St Dominic's College	Kingswood	Penrith	7–12	M	Christian Brothers	1959
St Edward's Christian Brothers College	East Gosford	Central Coast	7–12	M	Christian Brothers	1953
St Francis Catholic College, Oran Park	Edmondson Park	Liverpool	K–12	Co-ed	Systemic	2017
St Francis de Sales Regional College	Leeton	Leeton Shire	7–12	Co-ed	Systemic	1956
St Francis Xavier's College	Hamilton	Newcastle	7–12	Co-ed	Systemic	1985
St Gregory's College, Campbelltown	Campbelltown	Campbelltown	K–12	M & Co-ed	Marist Brothers	1926
St Ignatius' College, Riverview	Lane Cove	Lane Cove	5–12	M	Jesuit	1880
St John Bosco College	Engadine	Sutherland	7–12	Co-ed	Systemic	1978
St John Paul College	Coffs Harbour	Coffs Harbour	7–12	Co-ed	Systemic	1983
St John Paul II Catholic College (formerly Terra Sancta College)	Quakers Hill	Blacktown	7–12	Co-ed	Systemic	1996
St John the Evangelist Catholic High School	Nowra	Shoalhaven	7–12	Co-ed	Systemic	1990
St John's College	Dubbo	Dubbo	7–12	Co-ed	Systemic	1969
St John's College, Woodlawn	Lismore	Lismore	7–12	Co-ed	Systemic	1931
St John XXIII Catholic College	Stanhope Gardens	Blacktown	K–12	Co-ed	Systemic	2005
St Joseph's Catholic College	East Gosford	Central Coast	7–12	F	Systemic	1960
St Joseph's Catholic High School	Albion Park	Shellharbour	7–12	Co-ed	Systemic	1982
St Joseph's College	Banora Point	Tweed Shire	7–12	Co-ed	Systemic	1993
St Joseph's College	Hunters Hill	Hunter's Hill	7–12	M	Marist Brothers	1881
St Joseph's College	Lochinvar	Maitland	7–12	Co-ed	Systemic	1883
St Joseph's Catholic College	Aberdeen	Upper Hunter Shire	7–12	Co-ed	Systemic	1896
St Joseph's Regional College (formerly St Joseph's Hastings Regional High School)	Port Macquarie	Port Macquarie-Hastings	7–12	Co-ed	Systemic	1969
St Leo's Catholic College	Wahroonga	Hornsby	7–12	Co-ed	Systemic	1955
St Luke's Catholic College	Marsden Park	Blacktown	K–12	Co-ed	Systemic	2017
St Maroun's College	Dulwich Hill	Inner West	K–12	Co-ed	Maronite	1970
St Mary MacKillop College (formerly Blessed Mary MacKillop Colleges Albury)	Jindera	Greater Hume	K–12	Co-ed	Independent	2009
St Mary MacKillop Colleges (formerly Blessed Mary MacKillop College)	Wagga Wagga	Wagga Wagga	K–12	Co-ed	Independent	2007
St Mary Star of the Sea College	Wollongong	Wollongong	7–12	F	Sisters of the Good Samaritan	1873
St Mary's Cathedral College, Sydney	Sydney	Sydney	K–12	Co-ed	Systemic	1824
St Mary's Catholic College	Gateshead	Lake Macquarie	7–12	Co-ed	Systemic	1964
St Mary's Catholic College	Casino	Richmond Valley	7–12	Co-ed	Systemic	1978
St Mary's Catholic School (formerly known as St Mary's Central School)	Wellington	Dubbo	K–10	Co-ed	Systemic	1861
St Mary's College	Gunnedah	Gunnedah Shire	7–12	Co-ed	Systemic	1879
St Matthew's Catholic School	Mudgee	Mid-West	K–12	Co-ed	Systemic	1912
St Patrick's College	Campbelltown	Campbelltown	7–12	F	Sisters of the Good Samaritan	1840
St Patrick's College, Strathfield	Strathfield	Strathfield	5–12	M	Christian Brothers	1928
St Patrick's College Sutherland	Sutherland	Sutherland	7–12	Co-ed	Systemic	1956
St Patrick's Marist College	Dundas	Parramatta	7–12	Co-ed	Systemic	1872
St Patrick's Parish School	Cooma	Snowy Monaro	K–10	Co-ed	Systemic	1887
St Paul's Catholic College	Booragul	Lake Macquarie	7–12	Co-ed	Systemic	1984
St Paul's Catholic College	Greystanes	Cumberland	7–12	M	Systemic	1958
St Paul's Catholic College	Manly	Northern Beaches	7–12	Co-ed	Systemic	1929
St Paul's College, Kempsey	West Kempsey	Kempsey	7–12	Co-ed	Systemic	1980
St Paul's International College (formerly known as Aurora College)	Moss Vale	Wingecarribee	7–12	Co-ed	Sisters of Charity of St. Paul	1986
St Peter's Catholic College	Tuggerah	Central Coast	7–12	Co-ed	Systemic	2000
St Philomena's School	Moree	Moree Plains Shire	K–10	Co-ed	Systemic	1898
St Pius X College	Chatswood	Willoughby	5–12	M	Christian Brothers	1937
St Raphael's Central School	Cowra	Cowra Shire	K–12	Co-ed	Systemic	1870
St Scholastica's College	Glebe Point	Sydney	7–12	F	Sisters of the Good Samaritan	1878
St Stanislaus' College	Bathurst	Bathurst	7–12	M	Congregation of the Mission	1867
St Ursula's College	Kingsgrove	Canterbury-Bankstown	7–12	F	Systemic	1957
St Vincent's College	Ashfield	Inner West	K–12	Co-ed	Systemic	2023
St Vincent's College	Potts Point	Sydney	7–12	F	Sisters of Charity	1858
Stella Maris College	Manly	Northern Beaches	7–12	F	Sisters of the Good Samaritan	1931
Tangara School for Girls	Cherrybrook	Hornsby	K–12	F & Co-ed	PARED	1982
Trinity Catholic College (formerly St Pius X High School)	Adamstown	Newcastle	7–12	Co-ed	Systemic	1959
Trinity Catholic College	Auburn	Cumberland	7–12	Co-ed	Systemic	1995
Trinity Catholic College, Goulburn (amalgamation of St Patrick's College and Marian College)	Goulburn	Goulburn Mulwaree	7–12	Co-ed	Systemic	2000
Trinity Catholic College, Lismore	Lismore	Lismore	7–12	Co-ed	Marist Brothers	1985
Waverley College	Waverley	Waverley	5–12	M	Christian Brothers	1903
Wollemi College	Werrington	Penrith	2–12	M	PARED	2004
Xavier Catholic College, Ballina	Skennars Head	Ballina	7–12	Co-ed	Systemic	2000
Xavier Catholic College	Llandilo	Penrith	7–12	Co-ed	Systemic	1999
Xavier Catholic College	North Albury	Albury	7–12	Co-ed	Systemic	1983

== Independent schools ==
School	Suburb or town	LGA	Years	M/F/Co-ed	Category	Founded
Abbotsleigh	Wahroonga	Ku-ring-gai	K–12	F	Anglican	1885
Aetaomah School	Terragon	Tweed Shire	K–8	Co-ed	Rudolf Steiner	1991
AGBU Alexander Primary School	Duffys Forest	Northern Beaches	K–6	Co-ed	AGBU	1990
Al Amanah College	Liverpool	Liverpool	K–12	Co-ed	Islamic	1998
Al-Faisal College (formerly Iqra Grammar College)	Auburn, Minto	Cumberland	K–12	Co-ed	Islamic	1998
Al Hikma College	Lakemba	Canterbury-Bankstown	K–6	Co-ed	Islamic	2012
Al Noori Muslim School	Greenacre	Canterbury-Bankstown	K–12	Co-ed	Islamic	1983
Al Sadiq College	Yagoona	Canterbury-Bankstown	K–12	Co-ed	Islamic	2002
Al Zahra College	Arncliffe	Bayside	K–12	Co-ed	Islamic	1998
All Saints Grammar School	Belmore	Canterbury-Bankstown	K–12	Co-ed	Greek Orthodox	1990
The Alpine School	Cooma	Snowy Monaro	K–12	Co-ed	Rudolf Steiner	2019
Amity College (formerly Sule College) (Illawarra Campus)	Shellharbour	Shellharbour	K–12	Co-ed	Islamic	1999
Amity College (formerly Sule College) (Prestons Campus)	Prestons	Liverpool	K–12	Co-ed	Islamic	1995
Amity College (formerly Sule College) (Auburn Campus)	Auburn	Cumberland	K–6	Co-ed	Islamic	2001
The Anglican School Googong	Googong	Queanbeyan–Palerang	K–12	Co-ed	Anglican	2015
Arden Anglican School	Beecroft	Hornsby	K–12	Co-ed	Anglican	1922
Arkana College	Kingsgrove	Georges River	K–6	Co-ed	Islamic	1960
The Armidale School	Armidale	Armidale	K–12	Co-ed	Anglican	1894
The Armidale Waldorf School	Armidale	Armidale	K–12	Co-ed	Rudolf Steiner	1985
Arndell Anglican College	Oakville	Hawkesbury	K–12	Co-ed	Anglican	1990
Arrahman College	Austral	Liverpool	K–6	Co-ed	Islamic	2022
Ascham School	Edgecliff	Woollahra	K–12	F	Dalton Plan	1886
The Athena School	Newtown	Inner West	K–10	Co-ed	Scientology	1986
Aurora Southern Highlands Steiner School	Bowral	Wingecarribee	K–12	Co-ed	Rudolf Steiner	2013
Australian Christian College – Marsden Park	Riverstone	Blacktown	K–12	Co-ed	Non-denominational	2007
Australian Christian College – Singleton	Singleton	Singleton	K–12	Co-ed	Non-denominational	1988
Australian International Academy, Sydney (formerly known as Noor Al Houda Islamic College)	Strathfield South	Strathfield	K–12	Co-ed	Islamic	1995
Australian International Academy, Sydney	Kellyville	The Hills	K–12	Co-ed	Islamic	2014
Australian International High School, Sydney	Sydney	Sydney	11–12	Co-ed	No religious affiliation	
Australian Islamic College of Sydney (formerly King Abdul Aziz College)	Mount Druitt	Blacktown	K–12	Co-ed	Islamic	1997
Australian Performing Arts Grammar School	Glebe	Sydney	7–12	Co-ed	No religious affiliation	2005
Avondale School	Cooranbong	Lake Macquarie	K–12	Co-ed	Adventist	1897
Barker College	Hornsby	Hornsby	K–12	Co-ed	Anglican	1890
Barrenjoey Montessori School	Avalon	Northern Beaches	K–6	Co-ed	Montessori	1985
Bellfield College	Rossmore	Liverpool	K–12	Co-ed	Islamic	2008
Belmont Christian College	Belmont North	Lake Macquarie	K–12	Co-ed	Non-denominational	1983
Berowra Christian School (formerly Pacific Berowra Christian School)	Berowa	Hornsby	K–6	Co-ed	Christian	1986
Bethel Christian School	Mount Druitt	Blacktown	K–12	Co-ed	Foursquare	1979
Bhaktivedanta Swami Gurukula School	Eungella	Tweed	K–12	Co-ed	Hare Krishna	1980
Bishop Druitt College	Coffs Harbour	Coffs Harbour	K–12	Co-ed	Anglican	1994
Bishop Tyrrell Anglican College	Fletcher	Newcastle	K–12	Co-ed	Anglican	1999
Blue Gum Community School	Hornsby	Hornsby	K–2	Co-ed	No religious affiliation	2023
Blue Hills College	Goonellabah	Lismore	K–12	Co-ed	Adventist	1950
Blue Mountains Grammar School	Wentworth Falls	Blue Mountains	K–12	Co-ed	Anglican	1917
Blue Mountains Steiner School	Hazelbrook	Blue Mountains	K–6	Co-ed	Rudolf Steiner	1983
Border Christian College	Thurgoona	Albury	K–12	Co-ed	Adventist	1953
Brewarrina Christian School	Gongolgon	Brewarrina Shire	K–10	Co-ed	Christian	2023
Brightwaters Christian College	Brightwaters	Lake Macquarie	K–10	Co-ed	Non-denominational	2004
Broughton Anglican College	Campbelltown	Campbelltown	K–12	Co-ed	Anglican	1986
Burrabadine Christian Community School	Dubbo	Dubbo	K–10	Co-ed	Non-denominational	1993
Byron Community Primary School	Byron Bay	Byron	K–6	Co-ed	Democratic	1989
Calderwood Christian School	Albion Park	Shellharbour	K–12	Co-ed	Christian Education National	1989
Calrossy Anglican School	Tamworth	Tamworth	K–12	Co-ed	Anglican	1919
Cameragal Montessori School	Neutral Bay and North Sydney	North Sydney	K–6	Co-ed	Montessori	1976
Cape Byron Rudolf Steiner School	Byron Bay	Byron	K–12	Co-ed	Rudolf Steiner	1988
Carinya Christian School, Gunnedah	Gunnedah	Gunnedah	K–10	Co-ed	Westminster	1999
Carinya Christian School, Tamworth	Tamworth	Tamworth	K–12	Co-ed	Westminster	1984
Casino Christian School	North Casino	Richmond Valley	K–12	Co-ed	Interdenominational	1995
Casuarina Steiner School (formerly Casuarina School for Rudolf Steiner Education)	Coffs Harbour	Coffs Harbour	K–6	Co-ed	Rudolf Steiner	1989
Cedars Christian College (formerly Lighthouse Christian School and Wollongong Christian Community School)	Farmborough Heights	Wollongong	K–12	Co-ed	Non-denominational	1981
Central Coast Adventist School	Erina	Central Coast	K–12	Co-ed	Adventist	1969
Central Coast Grammar School	Erina Heights	Central Coast	K–12	Co-ed	Non-denominational	1985
The Central Coast Montessori Primary School	Bateau Bay	Central Coast	K–6	Co-ed	Montessori	2017
Central Coast Rudolf Steiner School	Fountaindale	Central Coast	K–12	Co-ed	Rudolf Steiner	1994
Central Coast Sports College	Kariong	Central Coast	K–12	Co-ed	No religious affiliation	2013
Central West Leadership Academy, Dubbo	Dubbo	Dubbo	K-12	Co-ed	No religious affiliation	2018
Charlton Christian College	Fassifern	Lake Macquarie	K–12	Co-ed	Non-denominational	1998
The Children's House Montessori	North Ryde	Ryde	K	Co-ed	Montessori	1998
Christadelphian Heritage College Sydney	Kemps Creek	Penrith	K–12	Co-ed	Christadelphian	1998
Chrysalis School for Rudolf Steiner Education	Thora	Bellingen Shire	K–10	Co-ed	Rudolf Steiner	1982
Claremont College	Randwick	Randwick	K–6	Co-ed	Anglican	1882
Clarence Valley Anglican School (formerly The Cathedral School)	Clarenza	Clarence Valley Council	K–12	Co-ed	Anglican	1998
Coast Christian School	Bensville	Central Coast	K–6	Co-ed	Non-denominational	1987
Coffs Harbour Bible Church School	Toormina	Coffs Harbour	K–10	Co-ed	Non-denominational	1981
Coffs Harbour Christian Community School	Bonville	Coffs Harbour	K–12	Co-ed	Non-denominational	1981
Condell Park Christian School	Condell Park	Canterbury-Bankstown	K–10	Co-ed	Christian	1978
Coogee Boys' Preparatory School	Randwick	Randwick	K–6	M	Non-denominational	1914
Covenant Christian School	Belrose	Northern Beaches	K–12	Co-ed	Christian Education National	1978
Cranbrook School	Bellevue Hill	Woollahra	K–12	Co-ed	Anglican	1918
Currambena Primary School	Lane Cove	Lane Cove	K–6	Co-ed	Democratic	1969
Danebank	Hurstville	Georges River	K–12	F	Anglican	1933
Darkinjung Barker	Yarramalong	Central Coast	K–6	Co-ed	Anglican	2017
Dubbo Christian School (Christian Parent Controlled School)	Dubbo	Dubbo	K–12	Co-ed	Christian Education National	1983
Ebenezer Christian College (formerly Bethany Christian School)	Prospect	Blacktown	K–10	Co-ed	Baptist	2006
Elonera Montessori School	Mount Ousley	Wollongong	K–12	Co-ed	Montessori	1987
Emanuel School	Randwick	Randwick	K–12	Co-ed	Jewish	1983
Emmanuel Anglican College	Ballina	Ballina	K–12	Co-ed	Anglican	1998
Farmhouse Montessori School	North Balgowlah	Northern Beaches	K–6	Co-ed	Montessori	2010
Forestville Montessori School	Forestville	Northern Beaches	K–6	Co-ed	Montessori	1981
Frensham School	Mittagong	Wingecarribee	7–12	F	Non-denominational	1913
Frensham Junior School (formerly Gib Gate School)	Mittagong	Wingecarribee	K–6	Co-ed	Non-denominational	1954
Galstaun College (formerly Hamazkaine Arshak and Sophie Galstaun College)	Ingleside	Northern Beaches	K–12	Co-ed	Armenian Christian	1986
Georges River Grammar School (formerly Bankstown Grammar School)	Georges Hall	Canterbury-Bankstown	K–12	Co-ed	Anglican	1986
German International School Sydney	Terrey Hills	Northern Beaches	K–12	Co-ed	No religious affiliation	1989
Glenaeon Rudolf Steiner School	Middle Cove	Willoughby	K–12	Co-ed	Rudolf Steiner	1957
Green Point Christian College	Green Point	Central Coast	K–12	Co-ed	Baptist	1982
Greenacre Christian College	Greenacre	Canterbury-Bankstown	K–12	Co-ed	Baptist	1985
Hawkesbury Independent School	Kurrajong	Hawkesbury	K–6	Co-ed	No religious affiliation	1993
Headland Montessori ELC	Manly	Northern Beaches	K	Co-ed	Montessori	2017
The Heights Learning Community (Previously Valley View Adventist School)	Gillieston Heights	Maitland	K–6	Co-ed	Adventist	1985
Heritage Christian School	Port Macquarie	Port Macquarie	K–12	Co-ed	Christian Education National	1983
Heritage College Lake Macquarie	Morisset	Lake Macquarie	K–12	Co-ed	Christadelphian	2013
Highfields Preparatory and Kindergarten School	Lindfield	Ku-ring-gai	K–2	Co-ed	No religious affiliation	1945
Hills Adventist College	Castle Hill	The Hills	K–12	Co-ed	Adventist	1961
The Hills Grammar School	Kenthurst	The Hills	K–12	Co-ed	No religious affiliation	1982
Hills Montessori School	West Pennant Hills	The Hills	K	Co-ed	Montessori	1979
Hinterland Christian College (formerly Mullumbimby Christian School)	Mullumbimby	Byron	K–10	Co-ed	Non-denominational	1985
Holmes Secondary College	Sydney	Sydney	11–12	Co-ed	No religious affiliation	2006
HopePoint Christian School (formerly Calvary Chapel Christian School)	Georges Hall	Canterbury-Bankstown	K–6	Co-ed	Foursquare	1980
Hunter Christian School	Mayfield	Newcastle	K–12	Co-ed	Baptist	1981
Hunter Trade College (formerly known as Australian Technical College – Hunter)	Telarah	Maitland	11–12	Co-ed	No religious affiliation	2007
Hunter Valley Grammar School	Ashtonfield	Maitland	K–12	Co-ed	Non-denominational	1990
Hurstville Adventist School (formerly known as Hurstville Adventist Primary School)	Hurstville	Georges River	K–6	Co-ed	Adventist	2013
Illawarra Christian School	Cordeaux Heights and Albion Park	Wollongong	K–12	Co-ed	Christian Education National	1982
The Illawarra Grammar School	West Wollongong	Wollongong	K–12	Co-ed	Anglican	1959
Inaburra School	Bangor	Sutherland	K–12	Co-ed	Non-denominational	1982
Inner Sydney Montessori School	Balmain and Lilyfield	Inner West	K–6	Co-ed	Montessori	1981
International Chinese School	St Leonards	North Sydney	K–6	Co-ed	Anglican	2015
International Grammar School	Ultimo	Sydney	K–12	Co-ed	No religious affiliation	1984
International Maarif Schools of Australia – Gallipoli Campus	Auburn	Cumberland	K–12	Co-ed	Australian Turkish Maarif Foundation (ATMF)	2019
Irfan College	Cecil Park	Fairfield	K–12	Co-ed	Islamic	2013
Italian Bilingual School	Leichhardt	Inner West	K–6	Co-ed	No religious affiliation	2002
John Colet School	Belrose	Northern Beaches	K–6	Co-ed	Multi-faith	1985
Kamaroi Rudolf Steiner School	Belrose	Northern Beaches	K–6	Co-ed	Rudolf Steiner	1990
Kambala School	Rose Bay	Woollahra	K–12	F	Anglican	1887
Karuna Montessori School	Narraweena	Northern Beaches	K–6	Co-ed	Montessori	2010
Kempsey Adventist School	Kempsey	Kempsey	K–12	Co-ed	Adventist	2003
Kesser Torah College	Dover Heights	Waverley	K–12	Co-ed	Jewish	2004
Kindlehill School	Wentworth Falls	Blue Mountains	K–12	Co-ed	Rudolf Steiner	2000
Kingdom Culture Christian School	Arncliffe	Bayside	K–12	Co-ed	Christian	2015
The King's School	North Parramatta	Parramatta	K–12	M	Anglican	1831
Kinma School	Terrey Hills	Northern Beaches	K–6	Co-ed	Democratic	1972
Kinross Wolaroi School	Orange	Orange	K–12	Co-ed	Uniting	1975
Knox Grammar School	Wahroonga	Ku-ring-gai	K–12	M	Uniting	1924
Koinonia Christian Academy	Bourke	Bourke Shire	K–10	Co-ed	Koinonia Christian Fellowship	1993
Korowal School	Hazelbrook	Blue Mountains	K–12	Co-ed	Democratic	1978
Kuyper Christian School	North Richmond	Hawkesbury	K–12	Co-ed	Christian Education National	1982
The Lakes Christian College (formerly Kindalin Christian School)	Castlereagh	Penrith	K–12	Co-ed	Non-denominational	1979
Lakes Grammar – An Anglican School	Warnervale	Central Coast	K–12	Co-ed	Anglican	2004
Leppington Anglican College	Leppington	Liverpool	K-12	Co-ed	Anglican	2023
Liberty College	Tamworth	Tamworth	K–6	Co-ed	Assemblies of God	1999
Lindfield Montessori Preschool	Lindfield	Ku-ring-gai	K	Co-ed	Montessori	2008
Lindisfarne Anglican Grammar School	Terranora	Tweed Shire	K–12	Co-ed	Anglican	1981
Linuwel School (formerly Linuwel Rudolf Steiner School)	East Maitland	Maitland	K–12	Co-ed	Rudolf Steiner	1979
Living School	Lismore	Lismore	K–12	Co-ed	Independent	2020
Lorien Novalis School for Rudolf Steiner Education	Glenhaven	The Hills	K–12	Co-ed	Rudolf Steiner	1971
Lutheran Primary School	Wagga Wagga	Wagga Wagga	K–6	Co-ed	Lutheran	1982
Lycée Condorcet – The French School of Sydney	Maroubra Junction	Randwick	K–12	Co-ed	No religious affiliation	1969
Macarthur Adventist College	Macquarie Fields	Campbelltown	K–12	Co-ed	Adventist	1974
Macarthur Anglican School	Cobbitty	Camden	K–12	Co-ed	Anglican	1984
Macquarie Anglican Grammar School	Dubbo	Dubbo	K–12	Co-ed	Anglican	2002
Macquarie College	Wallsend	Newcastle	K–12	Co-ed	Adventist	1901
Macquarie Grammar School	Sydney	Sydney	7–12	Co-ed	No religious affiliation	2004
Maitland Christian School	Metford	Maitland	K–12	Co-ed	Non-denominational	1983
Malek Fahd Islamic School	Greenacre	Canterbury-Bankstown	K–12	Co-ed	Islamic	1989
Mamre Anglican School (formerly Mamre Christian College)	Erskine Park	Penrith	K–12	Co-ed	Anglican	1978
Manning Adventist School (formerly Manning District Adventist School)	Tinonee	MidCoast Council	K–6	Co-ed	Adventist	1977
Manning Valley Anglican College	Cundletown	MidCoast Council	K–12	Co-ed	Anglican	2003
Marsden Park Anglican College	Marsden Park	Blacktown	K–8	Co-ed	Anglican	2025
Masada College	St Ives	Ku-ring-gai	K–12	Co-ed	Jewish	1962
The McDonald College (formerly The McDonald College of the Performing Arts)	North Strathfield	Strathfield	K–12	Co-ed	No religious affiliation	1984
Medowie Christian School	Medowie	Port Stephens	K–12	Co-ed	Non-denominational	1995
Meriden School	Strathfield	Strathfield	K–12	F	Anglican	1897
MidCoast Christian College (Taree Christian College)	Taree	MidCoast Council	K–12	Co-ed	Non-denominational	1985
Minarah College	Green Valley	Liverpool	K–12	Co-ed	Islamic	2002
Minimbah Primary School	Armidale	Armidale	K–6	Co-ed	Aboriginal	1963
MLC School	Burwood	Burwood	K–12	F	Uniting	1886
Moama Anglican Grammar School	Moama	Murray River Council	K–12	Co-ed	Anglican	2005
Montessori East	Bondi	Waverley	K–6	Co-ed	Montessori	1978
Moree Christian School	Moree	Moree Plains Shire	K–12	Co-ed	Non-denominational	1984
Moriah College	Bondi Junction	Waverley	K–12	Co-ed	Jewish	1942
Mosman Church of England Preparatory School	Mosman	Mosman	K–6	M	Anglican	1904
Mount Annan Christian College	Mount Annan	Camden	K–12	Co-ed	Non-denominational	1999
Mount Sinai College	Maroubra	Randwick	K–6	Co-ed	Jewish	1981
Mountain View Adventist College	Doonside	Blacktown	K–12	Co-ed	Adventist	1968
Mountains Christian College	Blackheath	Blue Mountains	K–12	Co-ed	Christian Education National	1982
Mumbulla School for Rudolf Steiner Education	Bega	Bega Valley Shire	K–6	Co-ed	Rudolf Steiner	1988
Muslim Girls Grammar School	Granville	Cumberland	7–12	F	Islamic	2021
My Dream Australian Academy	Auburn	Cumberland	5–10	Co-ed	Islamic	2023
Nambucca Valley Christian Community School	Nambucca Heads	Nambucca Valley	K–12	Co-ed	Non-denominational	1991
Namoi Valley Christian School	Wee Waa	Narrabri Shire	K–10	Co-ed	Christian Education National	1983
Narromine Christian School	Narromine	Dubbo	K–6	Co-ed	Adventist	1983
The Nature School	Port Macquarie	Port Macquarie-Hastings	K–9	Co-ed	No religious affiliation	2018
Nautilus Senior College	Port Macquarie	Port Macquarie-Hastings	7–10	Co-ed	No religious affiliation	2017
Nepean Christian School (formerly Nepean District Christian School)	Mulgoa	Penrith	K–12	Co-ed	Christian Education National	1984
New England Girls' School	Armidale	Armidale	K–12	Co-ed	Anglican	1895
New Madinah College	Young	Hilltops Council	K–10	Co-ed	Islamic	2017
Newcastle Grammar School	Newcastle	Newcastle	K–12	Co-ed	Anglican	1859
Newcastle Waldorf School (formerly The Newcastle Rudolf Steiner School)	Glendale	Lake Macquarie	K–12	Co-ed	Rudolf Steiner	1980
Newington College	Stanmore	Inner West	K–12	M	Uniting	1863
Northcross Christian School (formerly Ryde Christian Community School)	Ryde	Ryde	K–6	Co-ed	Non-denominational	1981
Northern Beaches Christian School	Terrey Hills	Northern Beaches	K–12	Co-ed	Non-denominational	1981
Northholm Grammar School	Arcadia	Hornsby	K–12	Co-ed	Anglican	1983
Northside Montessori School (Pymble Campus)	Pymble	Ku-ring-gai	K–10	Co-ed	Montessori	1978
Northside Montessori School (Turramurra Campus)	Turramurra	Ku-ring-gai	K–6	Co-ed	Montessori	1978
Norwest Christian College (formerly known as Coverdale Christian School)	Riverstone	Blacktown	K–12	Co-ed	Non-denominational	1980
Nowra Anglican College	Bomaderry	Shoalhaven	K–12	Co-ed	Anglican	2000
Nowra Christian School	Nowra	Shoalhaven	K–12	Co-ed	Non-denominational	1981
OneSchool Global NSW (formerly Meadowbank Education Trust School (MET School))	Various	Various	3–12	Co-ed	Exclusive Brethren	1994
Oran Park Anglican College	Oran Park	Camden	K–12	Co-ed	Anglican	2017
Orange Anglican Grammar School	Orange	Orange	K–12	Co-ed	Anglican	2007
Orange Christian School	Orange	Orange	K–12	Co-ed	Christian Education National	1981
Oxford Falls Grammar School	Oxford Falls	Northern Beaches	K–12	Co-ed	Pentecostal	1984
Oxley College	Burradoo	Wingecarribee	K–12	Co-ed	Non-denominational	1983
Pacificbrook Christian School (formerly Muswellbrook Christian School)	Muswellbrook	Muswellbrook Shire	K–10	Co-ed	Non-denominational	1999
Pacific Coast Christian School (formerly Lakeside Christian College)	Tweed Heads South	Tweed Shire	K–12	Co-ed	Non-denominational	1993
Pacific Gulgangali Jarjums Christian School	Tweed Heads	Tweed Shire	K–6	Co-ed	Christian	2022
Pacific Hills Christian School	Dural	Hornsby	K–12	Co-ed	Non-denominational	1970
Pacific Valley Christian School	Townsend	Clarence Valley Council	K–12	Co-ed	Non-denominational	2010
Pal Buddhist School (formerly Pal International School)	Canley Vale	Fairfield	K–12	Co-ed	Buddhist	2013
Parkes Christian School	Parkes	Parkes Shire	K–12	Co-ed	Non-denominational	1981
Penrith Anglican College	Orchard Hills	Penrith	K–12	Co-ed	Anglican	1998
Penrith Christian School	Orchard Hills	Penrith	K–12	Co-ed	Non-denominational	1985
The Pittwater House Schools	Collaroy	Northern Beaches	K–12	F & M	Non-denominational	1961
Port Macquarie Adventist School	Port Macquarie	Port Macquarie-Hastings	K–12	Co-ed	Adventist	1952
Port Macquarie Steiner School	Port Macquarie	Port Macquarie-Hastings	K–6	Co-ed	Rudolf Steiner	2018
Presbyterian Ladies' College, Armidale	Armidale	Armidale	K–12	F	Presbyterian	1887
Presbyterian Ladies' College, Sydney	Croydon	Burwood; Inner West	K–12	F	Presbyterian	1888
Pymble Ladies' College	Pymble	Ku-ring-gai	K–12	F	Uniting	1916
Queenwood School for Girls	Balmoral Beach	Mosman	K–12	F	Non-denominational	1925
Rainbow Ridge School for Steiner Education	Lillian Rock	Lismore	K–8	Co-ed	Rudolf Steiner	1996
Ravenswood School for Girls	Gordon	Ku-ring-gai	K–12	F	Uniting	1901
Reddam House Sydney	Woollahra, North Bondi	Woollahra	K–12	Co-ed	Non-denominational	2001
Redeemer Baptist School	North Parramatta	Parramatta	K–12	Co-ed	Baptist	1981
Regents Park Christian School (formerly Christian Community High School)	Regents Park	Cumberland	K–12	Co-ed	Non-denominational	1976
Richard Gill School	Muswellbrook	Muswellbrook Shire	K–6	Co-ed	No religious affiliation	2021
Richard Johnson Anglican School	Oakhurst	Blacktown	K–12	Co-ed	Anglican	1997
Richmond Christian College	Ballina	Ballina	K–12	Co-ed	Christian Education National	1993
Rissalah College	Lakemba	Canterbury-Bankstown	K–12	Co-ed	Islamic	1997
The Riverina Anglican College	Wagga Wagga	Wagga Wagga	K–12	Co-ed	Anglican	1999
Roseville College	Roseville	Ku-ring-gai	K–12	F	Anglican	1908
Rouse Hill Anglican College	Rouse Hill	The Hills	K–12	Co-ed	Anglican	2002
Salamah College	Chester Hill	Canterbury-Bankstown	K–12	Co-ed	Islamic	2012
Sapphire Coast Anglican College, (formerly Bega Valley Christian College)	Bega	Bega Valley Shire	K–12	Co-ed	Anglican	1994
Sathya Sai College	Murwillumbah	Tweed Shire	K–12	Co-ed	Sathya Sai	1997
SCECGS Redlands (Sydney Church of England Co-educational Grammar School, Redlands)	Cremorne	North Sydney	K–12	Co-ed	Anglican	1884
SCEGGS Darlinghurst	Darlinghurst	Sydney	K–12	F	Anglican	1895
Scone Grammar School	Scone	Upper Hunter Shire	K–12	Co-ed	Anglican	1887
The Scots College	Bellevue Hill	Woollahra	K–12	M	Presbyterian	1893
The Scots School Albury	Albury	Albury	K–12	Co-ed	Uniting	1972
Scots All Saints' College	Bathurst	Bathurst	K–12	Co-ed	Presbyterian	2019
Shearwater, The Mullumbimby Steiner School	Mullumbimby	Byron	K–12	Co-ed	Rudolf Steiner	1993
Shellharbour Anglican College	Dunmore	Shellharbour	K–12	Co-ed	Anglican	2004
Sherwood Hills Christian School	Bradbury	Campbelltown	K–12	Co-ed	Baptist	1979
Shire Christian School (formerly Sutherland Shire Christian School)	Barden Ridge	Sutherland	K–12	Co-ed	Christian Education National	1977
Shore – Sydney Church of England Grammar School	North Sydney	North Sydney	K–12	M & Co-ed	Anglican	1889
The Small School	Murwillumbah	Tweed Shire	K–10	Co-ed	Democratic	2019
Snowy Mountains Christian School	Cooma North	Snowy Monaro	K–10	Co-ed	Non-denominational	1997
Snowy Mountains Grammar School	Jindabyne	Snowy Monaro	K–12	Co-ed	Anglican	1996
Southern Cross Baptist Church Christian School	Engadine	Sutherland	K–12	Co-ed	Baptist	1988
Southern Highlands Christian School	Bowral	Wingecarribee	K–12	Co-ed	Christian Education National	1983
Southside Montessori School	Riverwood	Georges River	K–6	Co-ed	Montessori	1979
St Andrew's Cathedral School	Sydney	Sydney	K–12	Co-ed	Anglican	1885
St Andrew's Cathedral Gawura School	Sydney	Sydney	K–6	Co-ed	Anglican	2011
St Andrew's Christian School	Clarenza	Clarence Valley Council	K–12	Co-ed	Non-denominational	1998
St Bishoy Coptic Orthodox College	Mount Druitt	Blacktown	K–12	Co-ed	Coptic Orthodox	2001
St Catherine's School	Waverley	Waverley	K–12	F	Anglican	1856
St Columba Anglican School	Port Macquarie	Port Macquarie-Hastings	K–12	Co-ed	Anglican	2002
St Euphemia College	Bankstown	Canterbury-Bankstown	K–12	Co-ed	Greek Orthodox	1989
St George Christian School	Hurstville	Georges River	K–12	Co-ed	Non-denominational	1981
St Hurmizd Assyrian Primary School	Greenfield Park	Fairfield	K–6	Co-ed	Assyrian Christian	2002
St John's Lutheran Primary School	Jindera	Greater Hume	K–6	Co-ed	Lutheran	1868
St Luke's Grammar School	Dee Why	Northern Beaches	K–12	Co-ed	Anglican	1993
St Mark's Coptic Orthodox College	Wattle Grove	Liverpool	K–12	Co-ed	Coptic Orthodox	1996
St Mary & St Mina's Coptic Orthodox College (Bexley Campus)	Bexley	Bayside	K–12	Co-ed	Coptic Orthodox	1999
St Narsai Assyrian Christian College	Penrith	Penrith	7–12	Co-ed	Assyrian Christian	2006
St Paul's College	Walla Walla	Greater Hume	7–12	Co-ed	Lutheran	1948
St Paul's Grammar School	Cranebrook	Penrith	K–12	Co-ed	Non-denominational	1983
St Paul's Lutheran Primary School	Henty	Greater Hume	K–6	Co-ed	Lutheran	1930
St Peter's Anglican College	Broulee	Eurobodalla	K–12	Co-ed	Anglican	2003
St Peter's Anglican Grammar	Campbelltown	Campbelltown	K–6	Co-ed	Anglican	1983
St. Philip's Christian College – Cessnock (formerly known as Cessnock Christian School)	Cessnock	Cessnock	K–12	Co-ed	Non-denominational	2005
St. Philip's Christian College – Gosford (formerly known as Gosford Christian College)	Narara	Central Coast	K–12	Co-ed	Non-denominational	2007
St. Philip's Christian College – Port Stephens	Salamander Bay	Port Stephens Council	K–12	Co-ed	Non-denominational	1995
St. Philip's Christian College – Waratah	Waratah	Newcastle	K–12	Co-ed	Non-denominational	1982
St Sava College	Varroville	Campbelltown	K–6	Co-ed	Serbian Orthodox	2021
St Spyridon College	Maroubra	Randwick	K–12	Co-ed	Greek Orthodox	1983
Summerland Christian College	Goonellabah	Lismore	K–12	Co-ed	Non-denominational	1976
Sydney Adventist School, Auburn (formerly known as Auburn Adventist School)	Auburn	Cumberland	K–6	Co-ed	Adventist	1903
Sydney Grammar School	Darlinghurst	Sydney	7–12	M	Non-denominational	1854
Sydney Grammar School – Edgecliff Preparatory School	Paddington	Woollahra	K–6	M	Non-denominational	1913
Sydney Grammar School – St Ives Preparatory School	St Ives	Ku-ring-gai	K–6	M	Non-denominational	????
Sydney Japanese International School	Terrey Hills	Northern Beaches	K–6	Co-ed	No religious affiliation	1969
Sydney Montessori School	Gymea	Sutherland	K–12	Co-ed	Montessori	1981
Sydney Science College	Epping	Parramatta	11–12	Co-ed	No religious affiliation	
Tallowood Steiner School	Bowraville	Nambucca Valley Council	K–6	Co-ed	Rudolf Steiner	1984
Tambelin Independent School	Goulburn	Goulburn Mulwaree	K–6	Co-ed	Democratic	1978
Tara Anglican School for Girls	North Parramatta	Parramatta	K–12	F	Anglican	1897
Taylors College	Waterloo	Sydney	10–12	Co-ed	No religious affiliation	1920
Thomas Hassall Anglican College	West Hoxton	Liverpool	K–12	Co-ed	Anglican	2000
Thomas More Christian Montessori School	Bega	Bega Valley	K–6	Co-ed	Montessori	1997
Toongabbie Christian College	Toongabbie	Parramatta	K–12	Co-ed	Non-denominational	1981
Toronto Adventist School	Toronto	Lake Macquarie	K–6	Co-ed	Adventist	????
Trinity Anglican College – Albury	Thurgoona	Albury	K–12	Co-ed	Anglican	2002
Trinity Grammar School	Summer Hill	Inner West	K–12	M	Anglican	1913
Trinity Grammar School Preparatory School	Strathfield	Strathfield	K–6	M	Anglican	1938
Tudor House School	Moss Vale	Wingecarribee	K–6	Co-ed	Anglican	1897
Tuntable Falls Community School	Nimbin	Lismore	K–6	Co-ed	No religious affiliation	1981
Tweed Valley Adventist College	Murwillumbah	Tweed Shire	K–12	Co-ed	Non-denominational	1958
Tyndale Christian School	Blacktown	Blacktown	K–12	Co-ed	Christian Education National	1966
Unity Grammar College	Austral	Liverpool	K–12	Co-ed	Islamic	2008
Verity Christian College	Griffith	Griffith	K–12	Co-ed	Christian	2018
Vistara Primary School	Richmond Hill	Lismore	K–6	Co-ed	Ananda Marga	1987
Wagga Wagga Christian College	Wagga Wagga	Wagga Wagga	K–12	Co-ed	Non-denominational	1990
Wahroonga Adventist School	Wahroonga	Ku-ring-gai	K–12	Co-ed	Adventist	1905
Wahroonga Preparatory School (now part of Knox Grammar School)	Wahroonga	Ku-ring-gai	K-6	Co-ed	Uniting	1927
Wellington Christian School	Wellington	Dubbo	K–6	Co-ed	Non-denominational	1982
Wenona School	North Sydney	North Sydney	K–12	F	Non-denominational	1886
Westbourne College Sydney	Ultimo	Sydney	10–12	Co-ed	No religious affiliation	2021
Western Grammar School	Plumpton	Blacktown	K–12	Co-ed	Islamic	2012
Westmead Christian Grammar School (formerly Essington Christian Academy)	Westmead	Cumberland	K–6	Co-ed	Non-denominational	1983
William Clarke College	Kellyville	The Hills	K–12	Co-ed	Anglican	1988
William Carey Christian School	Prestons	Liverpool	K–12	Co-ed	Non-denominational	1984
Wollondilly Anglican College	Tahmoor	Wollondilly Shire	K–12	Co-ed	Anglican	2004
Wycliffe Christian School (formerly John Wycliffe Christian School)	Warrimoo	Blue Mountains	K–12	Co-ed	Non-denominational	1976
Wyong Christian Community School	Wyong	Central Coast	K–12	Co-ed	Non-denominational	1993
Yanginanook School	Belrose	Northern Beaches	K–12	Co-ed	Non-denominational	1982
Zahra Grammar School	Minto	Campbelltown	K–6	Co-ed	Islamic	2018

== Special and alternative schools ==
School	Suburb or town	M/F/Co-ed	Years	Category	Founded
Allegra School	Coffs Harbour	Co-ed	9–10		
ALESCO Senior College	Various	Co-ed	9–12	No religious affiliation	2002
Alpha Omega Senior College	Auburn	Co-ed	7–12	No religious affiliation	2011
Arise Christian College	Metford	Co-ed	K–12	Non-denominational	2020
Aspect Central Coast School	Various	Co-ed	K–12	Autism Spectrum Australia (Aspect)	
Aspect Hunter School	Various	Co-ed	K–12	Autism Spectrum Australia (Aspect)	
Aspect Macarthur School	Various	Co-ed	K–10	Autism Spectrum Australia (Aspect)	2011
Aspect Riverina School	Albury and Wagga Wagga	Co-ed	K–12	Autism Spectrum Australia (Aspect)	2011
Aspect South Coast School	Various	Co-ed	K–12	Autism Spectrum Australia (Aspect)	
Aspect South East Sydney School	Various	Co-ed	K–12	Autism Spectrum Australia (Aspect)	
Aspect Vern Barnett School	Various	Co-ed	K–10	Autism Spectrum Australia (Aspect)	
Aspect Western Sydney School	Various	Co-ed	K–12	Autism Spectrum Australia (Aspect)	
Biala Special School	Ballina	Co-ed	K–10		1969
Blacktown Youth College	Hebersham	Co-ed	7–12		
Craig Davis College	Cordeaux Heights	Co-ed	7–12	Youth Off The Streets	2012
Dunlea Centre, Australia's Original Boys' Town	Engadine	Co-ed	3–12	Catholic	1939
EDEN College	Macquarie Fields	Co-ed	7–12	Youth Off The Streets	2012
Eileen O'Connor Catholic College	Lewisham	Co-ed	K–12	Catholic	2016
Elouera Special School	Cootamundra	Co-ed	K–12		
ET Australia Secondary College	Gosford	Co-ed	7–12		2013
Gateway Community High	Carlingford	Co-ed	9–12		2021
Giant Steps Sydney	Gladesville	Co-ed	K–12		1995
GOAL College (Formerly SEDA College)	Forest Lodge and Sydney Olympic Park	Co-ed	11–12		2016
Indie School	Various	Co-ed	9–12		2010
Key College	Redfern and Merrylands	Co-ed	7–12	Youth Off The Streets	
Maam Giingana Gumbaynggirr (formerly Gumbaynggirr Giingana Freedom School)	Coffs Harbour	Co-ed	K–8	Aboriginal	2022
Marri Mittigar School	Hornsby	Co-ed	K–8		2024
Macleay Vocational College	South Kempsey	Co-ed	9–12	No religious affiliation	1992
Macquarie University Special Education Centre	Macquarie Park	Co-ed	K–6		
Margaret Jurd College	Shortland	Co-ed	9–12		1980s
Mater Dei School	Camden	Co-ed	7–12	Catholic	1910
New Hope Christian School	Dural	Co-ed	K–12	Christian	2015
NextSense School	North Rocks	Co-ed	K–12		1860
Ngarra Christian College	Riverstone	Co-ed	K–7	Christian	2023
Ngaruki Gulgul	Kariong	Co-ed	9–12		2014
North Academy	West Wallsend	Co-ed	7–11		2023
North Coast Pathway	Alstonville	Co-ed	9–10		
Novoschool	Newcastle	Co-ed	7–9		
Novo Education Space (Formerly Alesco Illawarra)	Wollongong	Co-ed	9–12		2011
Oasis College	Surry Hills	Co-ed	11–12	The Salvation Army	2018
Odyssey College	Eagle Vale	Co-ed	11–12		1977
Pacific Hope Christian School	Tweed Heads South	Co-ed	1–12	Christian	2015
Pambula Beach Flexible Learning Centre	Pambula	Co-ed	7–10	Catholic	2020
Shoalhaven River College	Bomaderry	Co-ed	9–12		
Skillset Senior College	Dubbo	Co-ed	10–12		2015
St Dominic's Centre For Hearing Impaired Children	Mayfield	Co-ed	K–12	Catholic	1875
St Edmund's School	Wahroonga	Co-ed	5–12	Catholic	1951
St Gabriel's School for students with special needs	Castle Hill	Co-ed	K–12	Catholic	1922
St Laurence Flexible Learning Centre	Broadmeadow	Co-ed	7–10	Catholic	2019
St Lucy's School	Wahroonga	Co-ed	K–12	Catholic	1938
St Luke's Arrunga	Marsden Park	Co-ed	K–12	Catholic	2021
St Marys Flexible Learning Centre	St Marys	Co-ed	7–10	Catholic	2015
St Peter's Heart	Campbelltown	Co-ed	K–6	Anglican	2022
The Bowen College	Maroubra Junction	Co-ed	9–10	Youth Off The Streets	2018
The John Berne School (formerly known as Berne Education Centre)	Lewisham	Co-ed	7–10	Catholic	1998
The Joseph Varga School	Randwick	Co-ed	K–12		
The Lakes College	Blue Haven	Co-ed	9–10	Youth Off The Streets	2017
TLK Youth College	Berkeley Vale	Co-ed	9–12		
Valley Hope Christian School	Townsend	Co-ed	1–12	Christian	2017
Waranara School	Marrickville	Co-ed	9–12		2015
Warrah Specialist School	Dural	Co-ed		Rudolf Steiner	1960s
Warakirri College	Various	Co-ed	10–12		2007
WAYS Secondary	North Bondi	Co-ed	9–12		2009
Western Riverina Community School	Griffith	Co-ed	9–12		2018
William Campbell College	Nowra Hill	Co-ed	K–8		2023
Wollongong Flexible Learning Centre	Towradgi	Co-ed	7–10	Catholic	2013
Woodbury	Baulkham Hills	Co-ed	K–6		2006
Wycliffe Hope School	Warrimoo	Co-ed	K–10	Christian	2021
Yattalunga Valley Christian School	Green Point	Co-ed	K–6	Christian	2022

== Closed non-government schools ==
Name	Suburb	District	Category	Opened	Closed	Notes
Abbotsholme College	Killara	Ku-ring-gai		1908	1925	
Aberfeldy Preparatory School	Turramurra	Ku-ring-gai	Non-denominational	1931	2005	Became part of Pittwater House School in 1978
Albury Grammar School	Albury	Albury	Presbyterian Boys	1866	1972	Now part of The Scots School Albury
All Saints Catholic Primary School	Liverpool	Liverpool	Catholic	1834	2018	Now part of All Saints Catholic College, Liverpool
All Saints' College, Bathurst	Bathurst	Bathurst	Anglican	1874	2019	Became part of Scots All Saints' College
American International School of Sydney	Epping	Parramatta		1999	2009	
ANC High School	Sydney	Sydney	No religious affiliation	2008	2012	
Annesley Methodist Girls College	Bowral	Wingecarribee	Methodist Girls	1921	1960s	
Bathurst Christian School	Bathurst	Bathurst	Christian	1996	2011	
Benedict College	Auburn	Cumberland	Catholic Boys	1938	1994	Now part of Trinity Catholic College, Auburn
Benilde High School	Bankstown	Canterbury-Bankstown	Catholic Boys	1966	1998	Now part of LaSalle Catholic College, Bankstown
Bethany Christian College	Young	Hilltops Council	Christian	????	2005	
Bethlehem College, Ashfield	Ashfield	Inner West	Catholic Girls	1881	2022	Now part of St Vincent's College, Ashfield
Bexley Ladies' College	Bexley	Bayside	Independent Girls	1892	1956	
Bob Hughes Christian School	Chester Hill	Canterbury Bankstown	Non-denominational	1998	2014	
Bowral Rudolf Steiner School	Bowral	Wingecarribee	Rudolf Steiner	1983	2007	
The B'Nai Yacov School	Parramatta	Parramatta	Jewish	2010	2011	
Brighton College, Manly	Manly	Northern Beaches	Independent Girls	1889	1969	
Brigidine College	Maroubra	Randwick	Catholic Girls	1934	1988	
Christian Brothers College/Aquinas College	Albury	Albury	Catholic Boys	1917	1982	Now part of Xavier High School, Albury
Christian Brothers College, Burwood	Burwood	Burwood	Catholic Boys	1909	2009	
Christian Brothers College	Newtown	Inner West	Catholic Boys	1889	1970	Also known as St Joseph's High School
Christian Brothers College, Rose Bay	Rose Bay	Woollahra	Catholic Boys	1935	1968	
Christian Brothers College	Rozelle	Inner West	Catholic Boys	1892	1965	
Christian Brothers College	Sutherland	Sutherland	Catholic Boys	1956	1992	Now part of St Patrick's College, Sutherland
Christian Brothers College	Tamworth	Tamworth	Catholic Boys	1925	1980	Now part of McCarthy Catholic College, Tamworth
Christian Brothers College	Young	Hilltops Council	Catholic Boys	1919	1970s	Now part of Hennessy Catholic College
Christian Brothers High School	Bondi Beach	Waverley	Catholic Boys	1939	1988	Also known as O'Sullivan Catholic High School
Christian Brothers School, Balmain	Balmain	Inner West	Catholic Boys	1887	1990	
Christian Brothers Technical High School	Paddington	Sydney	Catholic Boys	1903	1966	Also known as St Francis Technical School
Christian Community School (formerly South Granville Christian Community School)	South Granville	Cumberland	Christian	1985	????	
Clement College	Cabramatta	Fairfield		????	2015	
Cooerwull Academy	Lithgow	Lithgow	Presbyterian Boys	1882	1920	
Cornell High School	Sydney	Sydney	No religious affiliation	2005	2011	
De La Salle College	Armidale	Armidale	Catholic Boys	1906	1975	Now part of O'Connor Catholic College
De La Salle College Ashfield	Ashfield	Inner West	Catholic Boys	1916	2022	Now part of St Vincent's College, Ashfield
De La Salle College	Coogee	Randwick	Catholic Boys	1946	1963	Became a campus of Marcellin College Randwick
De La Salle College	Dubbo	Dubbo	Catholic Boys	1889	1968	Now part of St John's College, Dubbo
De La Salle College	Kingsgrove	Canterbury-Bankstown	Catholic Boys	1956	1999	
De La Salle College	Marrickville	Inner West	Catholic Boys	1932	1982	Now part of Casimir Catholic College
De La Salle College, Orange	Orange	Orange	Catholic Boys	1928	1977	Now part of James Sheahan Catholic High School
Deniliquin Christian School	Deniliquin	Edward River Council	Christian Education National	1996	2022	
Esslemont College	Kellyville	The Hills	Baháʼí	2023	2024	
Eurobodalla Christian Community School	Surfside	Eurobodalla Shire	Christian	1994	2006	
Evergreen Montessori Pre and Primary School	Redfern	Sydney	Montessori	????	2008	
Fern Valley Montessori School	Cardiff	Lake Macquarie	Montessori	????	2008	
Holy Cross College	Bellambi	Wollongong	Catholic Girls	1966	1983	Now part of Holy Spirit College, Bellambi
Holy Cross College	Woollahra	Woollahra	Catholic Girls	1908	2001	
Holy Family High School	Marayong	Blacktown	Catholic	1967	1998	Now part of St Andrews College, Marayong
Hope Christian School	Narellan	Camden	Christian	2006	2012	
Illawarra Adventist Primary School	Corrimal	Wollongong	Adventist	1951	2009	
Jervis Bay Christian Community School	Vincentia	Shoalhaven	Christian	????	2014	
John Paul II Senior High School	Marayong	Marayong	Catholic	1981	1998	Now part of St Andrews College, Marayong
Lakeside Christian College	Tweed Heads South	Tweed Shire	Christian	1993		
Loquat Valley Anglican School	Bayview	Northern Beaches	Anglican	1947	2016	formerly SCEGGS Loquat Valley; Became part of St Luke's Grammar School
MacKillop Girls High School	Lakemba	Canterbury-Bankstown	Catholic Girls	1954	1998	Now part of Holy Spirit College, Lakemba
Macksville Adventist School	Macksville	Nambucca Valley Council	Adventist	1967	2019	Also known as Hibiscus Christian School
Manly Grammar School for Girls	Manly	Northern Beaches	Independent Girls	1926	1942	
Manning River Steiner School	Taree	MidCoast Council	Rudolf Steiner	1993	2012	
Marist Brothers College	Broken Hill	City of Broken Hill	Catholic Boys	1927	1972	Became part of Sacred Heart College, now a primary school
Marist Brothers College	Forbes	Forbes Shire	Catholic Boys	1950	1977	Now part of Red Bend Catholic College
Marist High School	Darlinghurst	Sydney	Catholic Boys	1911	1968	
Marist High School	Mosman	Mosman	Catholic Boys	1922	1968	Now part of Marist Catholic College North Shore
Marsden School	Bathurst	Bathurst	Anglican Girls	1925	1977	Became part of All Saints' College, Bathurst
Mater Dei College	Tuggerah	Central Coast	Catholic	1983	2000	Now part of St Peter's College, Tuggerah
Mary Immaculate College	Sutherland	Sutherland	Catholic Girls	1959	1992	Now part of St Patrick's College, Sutherland
The Meridian International College	Surry Hills	Sydney		????	2009	
Mirriwinni Gardens Aboriginal Academy	Bellbrook	Kempsey Shire	Adventist	????	2010	
Montessori Excelsior School	Pymble	Ku-ring-gai	Montessori	1985	2011	
Mowbray House	Chatswood	Willoughby	Independent Boys	1906	1954	
Mt Erin High School	Wagga Wagga	Wagga Wagga	Catholic Girls	1876	2003	Now part of Kildare Catholic College
Mt St Bernard College	Pymble	Ku-ring-gai	Catholic Girls	1894	1960s	
Mt St Mary's College	Katoomba	Blue Mountains	Catholic Girls	1901	1974	
Mt St Patrick's High School	Paddington	Sydney	Catholic Girls	1896	1978	Also known as St Francis School
Mullumbimby Adventist School	Mullumbimby	Byron	Adventist	1952	2008	
Murwillumbah Christian College	Murwillumbah	Tweed Shire	Christian	1993	2008	
Nazareth College	Bankstown	Canterbury-Bankstown	Catholic Girls	1968	1998	Now part of LaSalle Catholic College, Bankstown
Normanhurst School, Ashfield	Ashfield	Inner West	Independent Girls	1882	1941	
Osborne Ladies' College	Blackheath	Blue Mountains	Independent Girls	1910	1958	
Our Lady of Lourdes Infants School	East Lismore	Lismore	Catholic	????	2011	
Our Lady of Mercy College	Epping	Parramatta	Catholic Girls	1946	1993	
Our Lady of Mercy College	Forbes	Forbes Shire	Catholic Girls	1900s	1977	Now part of Red Bend Catholic College
Our Lady of Mercy College	Goulburn	Goulburn Mulwaree	Catholic Girls	1861	1977	Now part of Trinity Catholic College, Goulburn
Our Lady of Mercy College	Rose Bay	Woollahra	Catholic Girls	1926	1965	
Our Lady of Mercy High School	Parkes	Parkes Shire	Catholic Girls	1859	1977	Now part of Red Bend Catholic College
Our Lady of the Annunciation Catholic Primary School	Pagewood	Bayside	Catholic	1962	2022	Now part of Sacred Heart Catholic Primary School Matraville
Our Lady's/St Patrick's College	Dubbo	Dubbo	Catholic Girls	1880	1968	Now part of St John's College, Dubbo
Oxford College	Sydney	Sydney	No religious affiliation	1987	2019	
Pacific Outback Christian School	Bourke	Bourke Shire	Christian	????	2010	
Pal College	Cabramatta	Fairfield		1988	2011	
Patrician Brothers College	Liverpool	Liverpool	Catholic Boys	1954	1997	Now part of All Saints Catholic College, Liverpool
Patrician Brothers School	Forest Lodge	Sydney	Catholic Boys	1892	1967	
Peninsula Grammar School	Warriewood	Northern Beaches	Anglican Boys	1982	1992	Now part of St Luke's Grammar School
Pera Bore Christian School, Bourke	Bourke	Bourke Shire	Christian	1986	????	
Presbyterian Ladies' College	Goulburn	Goulburn Mulwaree	Presbyterian Girls	1921	1975	Became the Co-ed Argyle school from 1972
Presbyterian Ladies' College	Orange	Orange	Presbyterian Girls	1928	1975	Became the Co-ed Kinross School in 1973, Now part of Kinross Wolaroi School
Qibla College	Minto	Campbelltown	Islamic	1995	2016	
Roseby Preparatory School	Dee Why	Northern Beaches	Anglican	1961	1992	Now part of St Luke's Grammar School
Sacred Heart Girls High School	Mosman	Mosman	Catholic Girls	1900	1967	
Sacred Heart Infants School	Orange	Orange	Catholic	1924	2012	Now part of Catherine McAuley Catholic Primary School
Santa Maria College	Orange	Orange	Catholic Girls	1924	1980	Now part of James Sheahan Catholic High School
SCEGGS 'Glenifer Brae', Wollongong	Wollongong	Wollongong	Anglican Girls	1955	1975	Now part of The Illawarra Grammar School
SCEGGS Moss Vale	Moss Vale	Wingecarribee	Anglican Girls	1930	1974	
The Scots School, Bathurst	Bathurst	Bathurst	Presbyterian	1942	2019	Became part of Scots All Saints' College
Sherwood Cliffs Christian Community School	Glenreagh	Clarence Valley Council	Christian	????	2015	
Shoalhaven Anglican School	Milton	Shoalhaven	Anglican	1991	2016	
St Agnes Catholic Primary School	Matraville	Randwick	Catholic	1949	2022	Now part of Sacred Heart Catholic Primary School Matraville
St Aloysius College	South Grafton	Clarence Valley Council	Catholic Boys	1965	1989	Now part of McAuley Catholic College, Clarenza
St Aloysius High School	Hamilton	Newcastle	Catholic Girls	1915	1984	
St Anne's College	Dapto	Wollongong	Catholic Girls	1961	1984	
St Anne's High School	Adamstown	Newcastle	Catholic Girls	1966	1985	Now part of St Pius X High School, Adamstown
St Benedict's Girls' High School	Broadway	Sydney	Catholic Girls	1883	1963	
St Bernard's College	Katoomba	Blue Mountains	Catholic Boys	1941	1966	
St Brendan's College	Griffith	Griffith	Catholic Boys	1950	1970	Now part of Marian Catholic College
St Brigid's College	Marrickville	Inner West	Catholic Girls	1880s	1982	Now part of Casimir Catholic College
St Brigid's Primary School	Branxton	Hunter Valley	Catholic	1886	2010	Now part of Rosary Park Catholic School
St Columba's Primary School	Berrigan	Berrigan Shire	Catholic	1904	2020	
St Dominic's Catholic Primary School Flemington	Homebush West	Strathfield	Catholic	1923	2006	
St Dominic's College	Tamworth	Tamworth	Catholic Girls	1882	1980	Now part of McCarthy Catholic College, Tamworth
St Francis Xavier Primary School	Urana	Federation Council	Catholic	1941	2021	
St Francis Xavier's Primary School	Wentworth	Wentworth Shire	Catholic	1951	2006	
St Francis Xavier's Primary School	Wollongong East	Wollongong	Catholic	1838	2012	Now part of Good Samaritan Catholic Primary School, Fairy Meadow
St Gabriel's School	Waverley	Waverley	Anglican Girls	1893	1965	
St Gregory's Armenian School	Rouse Hill	The Hills Shire	Armenian Christian	1985	2010	
St John's College	Auburn	Cumberland	Catholic Girls	1892	1994	Now part of Trinity Catholic College, Auburn
St John's College	Lakemba	Canterbury-Bankstown	Catholic Boys	1954	1998	Now part of Holy Spirit College, Lakemba
St John Vianney's Catholic Primary School	Fairy Meadow	Wollongong	Catholic	1950	2012	Now part of Good Samaritan Catholic Primary School, Fairy Meadow
St Joseph's College	Albury	Albury	Catholic Girls	1868	1982	Now part of Xavier High School, Albury
St Joseph's College	Goulburn	Goulburn Mulwaree	Catholic Girls	1882	1977	Now part of Trinity Catholic College, Goulburn
St Joseph's College	Perthville	Bathurst	Catholic Girls	1872	1972	Now part of MacKillop College, Bathurst
St Joseph's Girls High School	Merewether Beach	Newcastle	Catholic Girls	1932	1984	
St Joseph's High School	Broken Hill	City of Broken Hill	Catholic Girls	1889	1973	Became part of Sacred Heart College, now a primary school
St Joseph's High School	Kogarah	Georges River	Catholic Girls	1914	1992	Now part of Bethany College
St Joseph's High School	Leeton	Leeton Shire	Catholic Girls	1926	1974	Now part of St Francis de Sales Regional College
St Joseph's High School	Lismore South	Lismore	Catholic Boys	1911	1984	Now part of Trinity Catholic College, Lismore
St Joseph's High School	Rozelle	Inner West	Catholic Girls	1903	1974	
St Joseph's Primary School	Eden	Bega Valley Shire	Catholic	1891	2011	
St Joseph's Primary School	Orange	Orange	Catholic	1980	2012	Now part of Catherine McAuley Catholic Primary School
St Joseph's Primary School	Werris Creek	Liverpool Plains Shire	Catholic	1915	2009	
St Luke's Girls School	Dee Why	Northern Beaches	Anglican Girls	1961	1992	Now part of St Luke's Grammar School
St Mary's Catholic Primary School	North Sydney	North Sydney	Catholic	1888	2020	Now part of Marist Catholic College North Shore
St Mary's College	Bathurst	Bathurst	Catholic Girls	1869	1972	Now part of MacKillop College, Bathurst
St Mary's College	Grafton	Clarence Valley Council	Catholic Girls	1885	1989	Now part of McAuley Catholic College, Clarenza
St Mary's College	Lismore	Lismore	Catholic Girls	1886	1984	Now part of Trinity Catholic College, Lismore
St Mary's College	Young	Hilltops Council	Catholic Girls	1916	1981	Now part of Hennessy Catholic College
St Mary's Elm Court	Moss Vale	Wingecarribee	Catholic Girls	1891	1976	Now part of Chevalier College
St Mary's High School	Liverpool	Liverpool	Catholic Girls	1879	1997	Now part of All Saints Catholic College, Liverpool
St Mary's High School	Maitland	Maitland	Catholic Girls	1867	1990	Now part of All Saints College, Maitland
St Mary's Infants School	Greta	Cessnock	Catholic	1886	2011	Now part of Rosary Park Catholic School
St Mary's Star of the Sea High School	Hurstville	Georges River	Catholic Girls	1885	1992	Now part of Bethany College
St Michael's Agricultural College	Goulburn	Goulburn Mulwaree	Catholic Boys	1953	1972	Also known as St Michael's Inverlochy
St Michael's College	Wagga Wagga	Wagga Wagga	Catholic Boys	1914	2003	Now part of Kildare Catholic College
St Patrick's College, Goulburn	Goulburn	Goulburn Mulwaree	Catholic Boys	1874	2000	Now part of Trinity Catholic College, Goulburn
St Patrick's Girls High School	Church Hill	Sydney	Catholic Girls	1866	1990	
St Patrick's School	Church Hill	Sydney	Catholic Boys	1872	1962	
St Paul's Anglican Church Choir School	Georges Hall	Canterbury-Bankstown	Anglican	1989	2004	Now part of Georges River Grammar
St Paul's College	Bellambi	Wollongong	Catholic Boys	1962	1983	Now part of Holy Spirit College, Bellambi
St Paul's High School	Port Macquarie	Port Macquarie-Hastings	Catholic	1994	2014	Now Part of Mackillop College, Port Macquarie
St Peter Chanel Girls' High School	Regents Park	Cumberland	Catholic Girls	1953	1994	Now part of Trinity Catholic College, Auburn
St Peter's/St John's High School	Maitland	Maitland	Catholic Boys	1884	1990	Now part of All Saints College, Maitland
St Pius X High School	West Kempsey	Kempsey	Catholic Girls	1910	1980	Now part of St Paul's College, Kempsey
St Therese's Primary School	Yenda	Griffith	Catholic	????	2016	
St Thomas Becket Primary School	Lewisham	Inner West	Catholic	1850s	2005	
St Ursula's College	Armidale	Armidale	Catholic Girls	1878	1976	Now part of O'Connor Catholic College
St Ursula's College	Ashbury	Inner West	Catholic Girls	1930	1965	
St Vincent's Catholic Primary School	Ashfield	Inner West	Catholic	1881	2022	Now part of St Vincent's College, Ashfield
Stratford School for Girls	Lawson	Blue Mountains	Anglican Girls	1915	1961	
Sydney Adventist College	Strathfield	Strathfield	Adventist	1919	2012	Also known as Seventh Day Adventist High School
Trinity Grammar School	Orange	Orange	Anglican	1924	1976	Now a preschool
Wadham Preparatory School	Strathfield	Strathfield		1943	1957	Now part of Meriden School
William Cowper Anglican School	Tamworth	Tamworth	Anglican	1999	2006	Now Part of Calrossy Anglican School
Wolaroi College	Orange	Orange	Methodist Boys	1886	1975	Now part of Kinross Wolaroi School
Woodcourt College	Dulwich Hill	Inner West	Independent Girls	1905	1935	
Woodford Academy	Woodford	Blue Mountains	Presbyterian Boys	1907	1972	
Woodstock School	Albury	Albury	Presbyterian Girls	1926	1972	Now part of The Scots School Albury
Yeshiva College	Bondi	Waverley	Jewish	2008	2022	

== See also ==
- List of government schools in New South Wales
- Lists of schools in Australia
