= Macarthur Adventist College =

Location
- 12 Victoria Road, Macquarie Fields, Sydney, New South Wales; Australia; 33°59′00″S 150°53′07″E

Information
- Type: Independent co-educational early learning, primary and secondary day school
- Religious affiliation: Australian Union Conference of Seventh-day Adventists
- Denomination: Seventh-day Adventist
- Established: 1974; 52 years ago
- Principal: Mr Sam Lett
- Staff: 40
- Years: Early learning and K–12
- Enrolment: Over 700
- Colours: Blue, charcoal, white
- Slogan: Shaping Minds. Transforming Futures.
- Website: macarthur.adventist.edu.au

Macarthur Adventist College is an independent Seventh-day Adventist co-educational early learning, primary and secondary day school, located in the south-western Sydney suburb of Macquarie Fields, New South Wales, Australia. It is a part of the Seventh-day Adventist education system, the world's second largest Christian school system.

== Location ==
The school is situated at 12 Victoria Road, Macquarie Fields, a suburb in south-western Sydney. The school is only a short walk from both Macquarie Fields Train Station and Glenfield Train Station which are part of the T8 Airport & South Line. There is also a public bus stop directly outside the front gates which services the local suburbs and surrounds.

== Curriculum ==
Macarthur Adventist College provides education from Pre-Kindergarten to Year 12, with its curriculum based on the requirements of the New South Wales education system and taught at college preparatory schools across the world. Students undertake studies across core curriculum areas including English, mathematics, science and human society and its environment, alongside a range of other subjects and learning opportunities offered across Primary and Secondary education.

== Spiritual aspects ==
Macarthur Adventist College is part of the Seventh-day Adventist education system and incorporates Christian education into its curriculum and wider College life. Students undertake religious education as part of their studies, covering Bible teachings and Christian and Religious denominational beliefs, and participate in worship and other faith-based activities throughout the year. The college states that its purpose is to "Reveal Jesus", with its faith-based program reflecting the beliefs and values of the Seventh-day Adventist Church.

== See also ==
- List of Seventh-day Adventist secondary schools
- Seventh-day Adventist education
- List of non-government schools in New South Wales
