= Kesser Torah College =

Kesser Torah College Sydney

Location
- Dover Heights, Sydney, New South Wales; Australia; 33°52′21″S 151°16′55″E

Information
- School type: Independent co-educational early learning, primary and secondary day school
- Motto: Hebrew: כי הם חיינו (For they [words of Torah] are our life)
- Religious affiliations: Orthodox Judaism; Chabad
- Established: 2003; 23 years ago
- Headmaster: Rabbi Yaacov Chaiton
- Years: Early learning and K–12
- Enrolment: 550
- Campus type: Suburban
- Website: www.kessertorah.nsw.edu.au

Kesser Torah College Sydney (lit., "Crown of Torah") is an independent Chabad Orthodox co-educational early learning, primary and secondary day school, located in Dover Heights, an eastern suburb of Sydney, New South Wales, Australia. The college provides education from preschool through Kindergarten to Year 12.

Kesser Torah was incorporated in December 2003 and has grown to accommodate over 500 students catering to over 300 families.

== Education Programs ==
Kesser Torah College incorporated in December 2003 as a Jewish orthodox school with a Chabad, Lubavitch ethos. It has grown to accommodate over 500 students catering to over 300 families. With a staff complement of 90 professionals, the school is committed to enhancing academic and extra-curricular learning for each child as an individual, and to providing the highest quality Jewish educational through the teachings of Chasidus and other Jewish manuscripts. While still catering a high class secular education, as well as pastoral care. The teachings of the Lubavitcher Rebbe continue to define the educational philosophy of Kesser Torah College.

The college is co-educational to Year 1. Boys and girls are taught separately from Years 2–6 in the primary school and in the high school.

Because the Jewish Studies and General Studies programs across the entire school are integrated, students can learn first hand how an excellent general education can enhance life as a Torah Jew and how spirituality can give meaning to their existence, undertakings and activities throughout life.

== Leadership ==
Former principals include Yehuda Spielman (principal for three years), Noteh Glogauer (principal for eight years), Samuel Gurewicz (held title of acting principal for one year), and Roy Steinman (principal for six years). The current principal is Rabbi Yaacov Chaiton.

== See also ==
- List of non-government schools in New South Wales
- Judaism in Australia
