= St John Paul College =

Catholic school in Australia

Location
- Coffs Harbour, New South Wales; Australia; 30.3305°S 153.0967°E

Information
- Type: Catholic school, co-educational
- Motto: The Way, The Truth and The Life
- Established: 1983
- Principal: Michael Carniato
- Grades: 7–12
- Enrolment: Approximately 1100
- Colours: Maroon, blue & light grey
- Website: www.cofhslism.catholic.edu.au

St John Paul College or SJPC (originally named John Paul College or JPC after Pope John Paul II, renamed on 27 August 2014 following his canonization) is a Catholic independent secondary school in Coffs Harbour, New South Wales, Australia.

John Paul College was opened in 1983 with Years 7 and 8, and was the culmination of many years of planning by the parish priest of Coffs Harbour, Father Anthony Casey and the Parents' Planning Committee. The current principal is Michael Carniato. The current Assistant Principals are Leanne Gennat (Mission), Michael Stubbs (Pastoral Care) and James Furey (Learning & Teaching).

== See also ==
- List of non-government schools in New South Wales
- Catholic education in Australia
