= All Saints Greek Orthodox Grammar School =

Location
- Belmore, South Western Sydney, New South Wales; Australia; 33°55′45″S 151°05′43″E

Information
- Other name: All Saints Grammar
- Type: Independent co-educational early learning, primary, and secondary day school
- Motto: Greek: ΣΤΩΜΕΝ ΚΑΛΩΣ (Let us Stand Well)
- Denomination: Christian Orthodoxy
- Established: 1990
- Principal: Elfa Lillis
- Deputy Principal: Jaime Rodriguez
- Employees: ~72
- Years offered: Early learning and K–12
- Enrolment: ~700 (2008)
- Campuses: Junior: Belmore; Senior: Belmore South
- Houses: Macedonia, Ionia, Attica, Kyrenia
- Colours: Navy blue; White
- Nickname: ASG
- Website: www.allsaints.nsw.edu.au

All Saints Greek Orthodox Grammar School, or simply All Saints Grammar (ASG), is a dual-campus independent Greek Orthodox co-educational early learning, primary, and secondary day school, located in the suburb of Belmore, New South Wales, Australia.

Established in 1990, the school's Junior campus for early learning to Year 6 is located in Belmore, and the Senior High School "Towers Campus" for students in Year 7 to 12 is located in Belmore South. The school has a non-selective enrolment policy, and, as of 2008, catered for approximately 700 students from early learning to Year 12.

== See also ==
- List of non-government schools in New South Wales
- Education in Australia
