= Tyndale Christian School, Sydney =

Tyndale Christian School

Location
- 58 Douglas Road, Blacktown, western Sydney, New South Wales; Australia; 33°46′55″S 150°53′09″E

Information
- Type: Independent co-educational early learning, primary and secondary day school
- Motto: Serve the Lord with Gladness; (Source: Psalm 100:2)
- Denomination: Non-denominational Christian
- Established: 1966; 60 years ago
- Educational authority: NSW Department of Education
- Principal: Peter De Audney
- Staff: 164
- Years: Early learning and K–12
- Enrolment: c. 950 (2018)
- Area: 5.6 hectares (14 acres)
- Houses: Carey; Knox; Wycliffe; Taylor
- Colours: Navy blue, maroon, white
- Song: "Serve the Lord with Gladness"
- Website: www.tyndale.edu.au

Tyndale Christian School is an independent, non-denominational Christian, co-educational, early learning, primary and secondary day school, in Blacktown, a suburb in Western Sydney, New South Wales, Australia.

The school is named after William Tyndale, a 16th-century religious reformer. The school is on 5.6 hectares (14 acres) in the south-west corner of Blacktown and is accessible by public bus routes and buses that Tyndale operates around the surrounding areas. As of 2021, the School had around 1,000 students from early learning, through Kindergarten to Year 12.

== History ==
In 1957 the Blacktown Reformed Church looked into the feasibility of starting a Parent Controlled Christian School in Blacktown. In February 1966 the Kildare Rd site was officially opened with 3 classrooms, 2 teachers and 32 students. At the time this site was educating students from Kindergarten to Year 6. In 1976 Tyndale expanded to offering high school education. It then developed and moved to the current Douglas Road site in 1979. In 1981 the first cohort of Year 12 students completed the NSW Higher School Certificate (NSW HSC). The early learning centre commenced with a preschool class in Term 2, 2008. The 2021 Year 12 cohort was the first to contain students who completed the whole of preschool to Year 12 at Tyndale.

== Structure ==
The school is split into three educational areas: early learning centre (pre-school and prep), primary school, and secondary school.

=== Early Learning Centre ===
There are three preschool classes catering for children from three years of age and one prep class operating 5 days per week.

=== Secondary ===
The Secondary school consists of Year 7 to Year 12, which is then split into 2 areas: High (Year 7 and 8) and Senior (Year 9 to 12) working towards award of the NSW HSC.

== Notable alumni ==
- Graham Joseph Hill – theologian

== See also ==
- List of non-government schools in New South Wales
