= Australian Performing Arts Grammar School =

Location
- 255 Broadway, Glebe, Sydney, New South Wales; Australia; 33°53′03″S 151°11′37″E

Information
- Type: Independent co-educational specialist secondary day school
- Motto: Empowering Creativity
- Established: 2005; 21 years ago (as the Australian International Performing Arts High School); 2012; 14 years ago (as the Australian Performing Arts Grammar School)
- Specialist: Creative and performing arts
- Years: 7–12
- Enrolment: c. 140
- Colours: White, black, taupe, red
- Website: www.apgs.nsw.edu.au

The Australian Performing Arts Grammar School (abbreviated as APGS) is an independent co-educational specialist secondary day school that specialises in creative and performing arts, located in Broadway, Glebe, an inner-city suburb of Sydney, New South Wales, Australia.

== History ==
The school, formerly known as the "Australian International Performing Arts High School" (AIPAH), was established in January 2005 with a total of 27 students for the purpose of providing a high quality, arts rich education to talented students of the wider community. In 2012 the school moved to a purpose-built facility in Broadway, Glebe in order to reach a wider demographic of students. Along with the new location, the school was renamed to the "Australian Performing Arts Grammar School" (APGS) to emphasise the renewed shift towards performing arts and academic excellence.

== Performances ==
APGS has performed at many high profile corporate, community and school events including:

- Showcase Performances at the Sydney Opera House, Seymour Centre, Enmore Theatre and Bangarra Dance Theatre
- The Lord Mayor's Christmas Party at The Rosehill Gardens
- Parramatta Business Awards for the Chamber of Commerce (2006, 2007, 2008, 2009, 2010)
- Performed for Oscar winner Dion Beebe at Parramatta Riverside
- Performed for Acclaimed Director Kimble Rendall
- International Disabilities Day (2007, 2011)
- Fast & Fresh Junior Playwrights Competition
- Sydney Festival, Glebe Street Fair

== See also ==
- List of non-government schools in New South Wales
- List of creative and performing arts high schools in New South Wales
