= Bethany College (Sydney) =

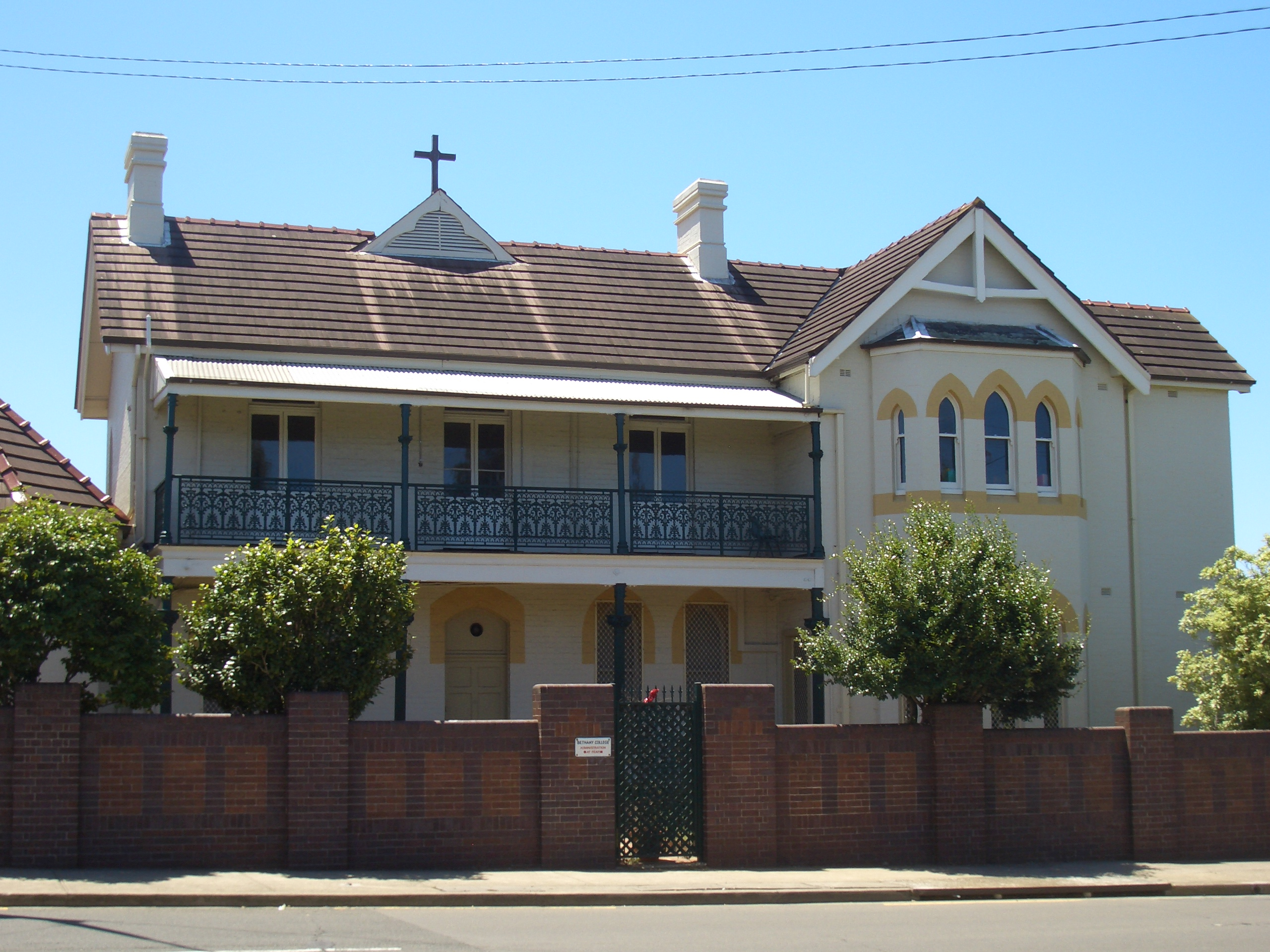
- Bethany College, Bexley

Location
- Hurstville, New South Wales; Australia; 33°57′42″S 151°6′46″E

Information
- Type: Independent comprehensive single-sex secondary day school
- Motto: Act justly, love tenderly, and walk humbly with God
- Denomination: Roman Catholic
- Principal: Kristina Flanagan
- Teaching staff: ~105
- Years: 7–12
- Gender: Girls
- Enrolment: ~1008 (2018)
- Campus type: Suburban
- Website: bethanyhurstville.syd.catholic.edu.au

Bethany College is an independent Roman Catholic comprehensive single-sex secondary day school for girls, located in Hurstville, a southern suburb in Sydney, Australia. In 2009 Bethany Junior and Senior campuses amalgamated into one campus in Hurstville. It is located directly across Sydney Technical High School on Forest Road.

== Facilities ==
- Marian Building – classrooms, together with Food Technology Kitchens, Information Technology, Textiles, Music Rooms, and Homerooms.
- Yallunga Hall – multi-purposed hall (performances, assembly, indoor basketball court, rain shelter)
- MacKillop Building- Classrooms, Homerooms, Science Labs, 4 levels
- Sophia Building – Classrooms, homerooms
- Penola Building – classrooms, homerooms
- Caritas Block – Office, Chapel Staff Rooms and Staff Common Rooms, Reception room, Principals office
- Chisholm Building & Demountables – Classrooms, homerooms
- Year 7 Playground – Penola Court
- Year 8 Playground – Chisholm Court
- Year 9 Playground – Chisholm Court
- Year 10 Playground – Yallunga Court
- Year 11 Playground – Yallunga Court
- Year 12 Playground – Yallunga Court
- Basketball Courts – Penola and Yallunga Court

== See also ==
- List of Catholic schools in New South Wales
- Catholic education in Australia
