= Amity College =

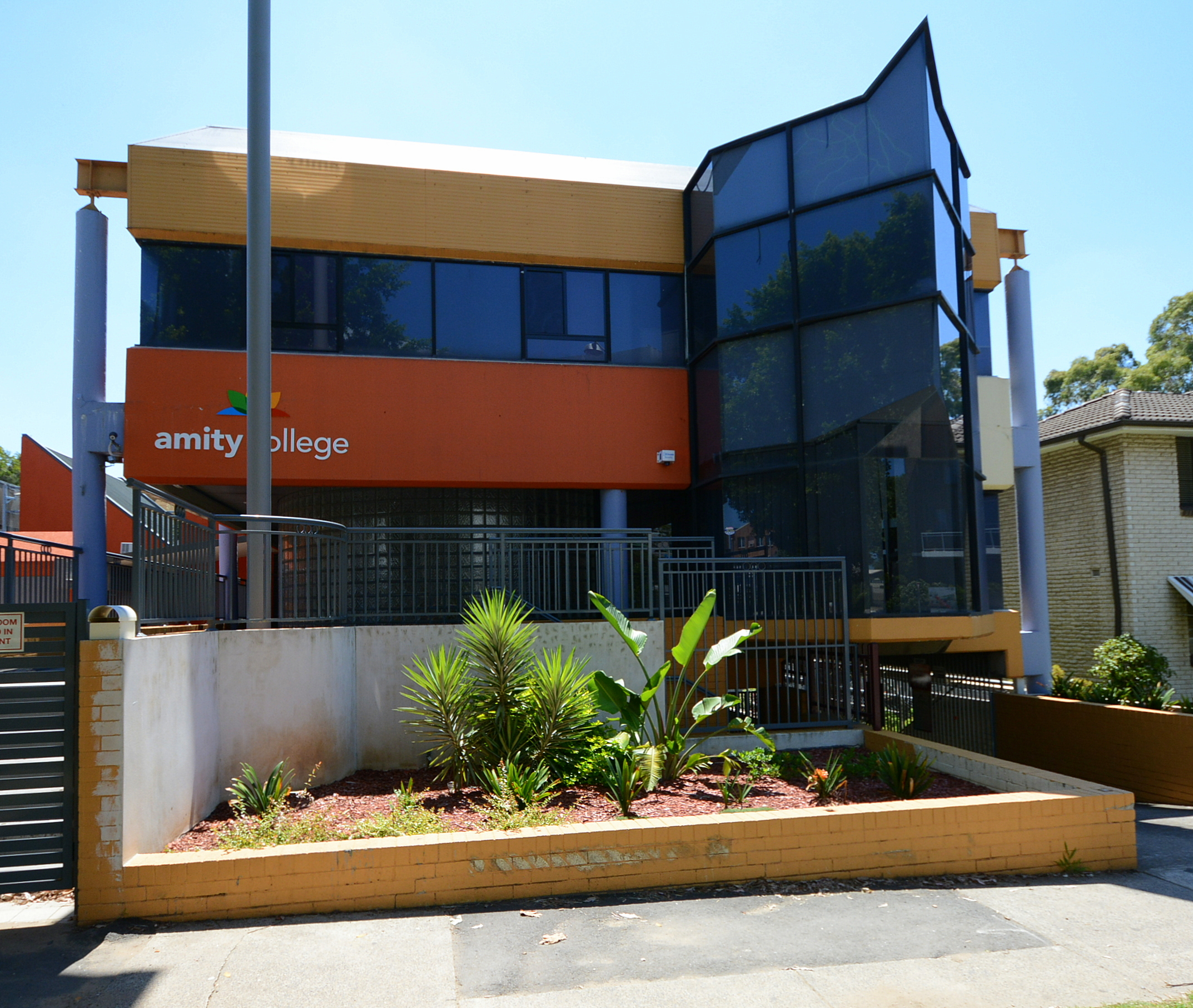
- Auburn campus
- Illawarra, Auburn and Prestons, New South Wales

Information
- Type: Independent
- Motto: Inspire. Explore. Achieve.
- Established: 1994
- Gender: Boys and girls
- Colours: Light blue, navy blue, grey, white, red
- Website: Amity College

Amity College, previously called Sule College, is an independent, non-denominational school that is currently operating in three different campuses in Prestons, the Illawarra, Auburn and Leppington

== Description ==
The main Prestons campus commenced its operation in 1996 with only 33 students; and it now consists of primary, secondary boys’ and secondary girls’ sections. Amity College has been offering a K–12 program at the Main Campus since 2002. The Illawarra campus commenced operation in 1999 with K–2 classes. As of 2026, the school caters for students from years K–12. The Auburn campus commenced operation in 2001 with K–2 classes. Currently, the Auburn campus caters for students from years K–6. The Prestons campus caters for K-12 with separate buildings/areas for the Primary school, Boys high school and Girls High school. A campus in Leppinton is now open for primary students.

== Academics ==
Amity College was ranked 127th in the Academic School Year of 2017.

== Principals ==
Amity currently has six principals, five being campus principals and one being the executive principal;

- Hasan Dagli – Amity College Boys High School Principal
- Ahmet Cimen – Amity College Auburn Primary Principal
- Ferhat Gurkhan – Amity College Illawarra Principal
- Nazan Polat – Amity College Prestons Primary Principal
- Omer Ayvaz – Amity College Girls High School
- Deniz Erdogan – Executive Principal

== Extracurricular activities ==
=== Sport ===
Sporting activities include:

- Soccer
- Cricket
- Rugby
- Basketball
- Chess
- Oztag

The school also organises Sports Camps such as a yearly Ski camp, this is offered to high school students.

=== Volunteer/charity ===
Amity College makes contributions to various different charities and all senior students are offered to partake in a project. Furthermore, the school runs various charity events such as the Worlds Greatest Shave, daffodil and harmony day. All the proceeds have been donated to charity organisations.

The current Year 12 Students are now raising funds to open a Health Clinic in Battambang, Cambodia.

== Campuses ==
- 34°34′24″S 150°51′50″E - Illawarra
- 33°51′09″S 151°01′57″E - Auburn
- 33°56′30″S 150°52′25″E - Prestons
