= James Sheahan Catholic High School =

Location
- Anson Street, Orange, New South Wales; Australia; 33°18′04″S 149°05′41″E

Information
- Type: Independent co-educational secondary day school
- Motto: Latin: Semper Paratus
- Denomination: Roman Catholic
- Established: 1980; 46 years ago
- Principal: Matt Ryan
- Staff: 32 (2025)
- Teaching staff: 77.8 FTE (2025)
- Grades: 7–12
- Enrolment: 1030 (2025)
- Campus type: Inner Regional
- Website: jschs.catholic.edu.au

James Sheahan Catholic High School is an independent Roman Catholic co-educational secondary day school, located in Orange, New South Wales, Australia. It is located on Anson Street in Orange next to the train line and is adjacent to the Orange Christian School. It is the largest Catholic school in the Bathurst Diocese.

== History ==
The school was founded in 1980 and was named after Monsignor James Sheahan, a Catholic priest who served in Orange for nearly 50 years. The school was formed by the merger of Santa Maria College, a girls' school, and De La Salle College, a boys' school.

== Notable alumni ==
- Freya Blackwood – illustrator and special effects artist
- Darren Britt – former NRL player
- Daniel Mortimer – former NRL player

== See also ==
- Catholic education in Australia
- List of Catholic schools in New South Wales
