= McCarthy Catholic College, Tamworth =

Location
- East Tamworth, Tamworth, New South Wales; Australia; 31°04′19″S 150°55′09″E

Information
- Former names: Our Lady of the Rosary College; McCarthy Catholic Senior High School
- School type: Independent co-educational secondary day school
- Motto: Receive, Worship, Serve
- Denomination: Roman Catholic
- Established: 2000; 26 years ago
- Oversight: Roman Catholic Diocese of Armidale
- Principal: Michael Whitton
- Years: 7–12
- Campus type: Regional
- Colours: Navy, white and yellow
- Website: www.mccarthy.nsw.edu.au

McCarthy Catholic College is an independent Roman Catholic co-educational secondary day school located in Tamworth, New South Wales, Australia. The college is administered by the Catholic Education Office of the Diocese of Armidale.

== Overview ==
McCarthy Catholic College is a co-educational Catholic high school for students in years 7 to 12. It was formed in 2000 through the amalgamation of Our Lady of the Rosary College (for years 7-10) and McCarthy Catholic Senior High School (for years 11-12). For historical reasons the college is named for Irish priest Father Timothy McCarthy who was the first resident priest in the New England Region from 1853 to 1874 and worked for the education of children.

=== College logo and mission statement ===
McCarthy's logo is a combination of a gold Chi Rho and the constellation of the Southern Cross on a navy blue background. The terms Receive, Worship, and Serve are part of the McCarthy Catholic College mission statement.

== History ==
The school is built on land that was first lived in by the Kamilaroi people. A school was founded on its current site by the Dominican Sister Patricia Rowe. The school was established in 2000, when the schools Our Lady of the Rosary College and McCarthy Catholic Senior High School merged.

== See also ==
- List of Catholic schools in New South Wales
- Catholic education in Australia
