= Marian Catholic College =

Location
- Griffith, Riverina, New South Wales; Australia; 34°17′09″S 146°03′29″E

Information
- Type: Independent co-educational secondary day school
- Motto: The Way, the Truth and the Life
- Religious affiliation: Roman Catholic Diocese of Wagga Wagga
- Denomination: Roman Catholic
- Patron saint: Mary, the Mother of God
- Established: 4 September 1921; 105 years ago
- Founders: Sisters of Mercy; Marist Brothers
- Principal: Alan Le Brocque
- Colours: Maroon and gold
- Website: www.mccww.catholic.edu.au

Marian Catholic College is a Roman Catholic co-educational Secondary day school, in Griffith in the Riverina region of New South Wales, Australia. Administered by the Roman Catholic Diocese of Wagga Wagga, the college caters to students from Year 7 to Year 12. It is called "Marian" in honour of Mary, the Mother of God, patron of the Sisters of Mercy and Marist Brothers who founded the college.

The 7th-12th years are split into middle school, school certificate years, and senior school. At the end of 10th year, students receive their School Certificate. At the end of 12th year, students receive their Higher School Certificate.

== Facilities ==
The school features 2 fully renovated kitchens for food technology and hospitality, a large enclosed hall used for indoor sports and gatherings and two computer rooms, and further computers in the school's library and classrooms. The school's outdoor sporting facilities include an oval, a netball court, a basketball court (within the same enclosure).

== Notable alumni ==
- Adrian Piccoli – Former MP for Murrumbidgee
- Joany Badenhorst – Paralympic athlete for para-snowboarding cross
