= Hennessy Catholic College =

Location
- Young, New South Wales; Australia; 34°18′52″S 148°17′31″E

Information
- Type: Independent co-educational secondary day school
- Motto: Live spiritually, learn dynamically, act justly
- Denomination: Roman Catholic
- Established: 2000; 26 years ago
- Enrolment: 550 (2013)
- Website: hccy.nsw.edu.au

Hennessy Catholic College is an independent Roman Catholic co-educational secondary day school, located in the town of Young, New South Wales, Australia. The College was established in 2000, and in 2013 had a school population of over 550 students, from Year 7 to Year 12.

== See also ==
- List of Catholic schools in New South Wales
- Catholic education in Australia
