= St Paul's College, Kempsey =

St Paul's College

Location
- Sea Street, West Kempsey, New South Wales; Australia; 31°03′40″S 152°49′24″E

Information
- Type: Independent co-educational secondary day school
- Motto: Let Your Light Shine
- Denomination: Roman Catholic
- Established: 1965; 61 years ago
- Principal: Geoff Melville
- Years: 7–12
- Enrollment: c. 1,000
- Colours: Light and dark blue
- Website: www.kmpslism.catholic.edu.au

St Paul's College is an independent Roman Catholic co-educational secondary day school, located in West Kempsey, New South Wales, Australia. The school caters for students in Year 7 to Year 12.

== History ==
The school was built on the land originally inhabited by the Dunghutti people. The school was established 1965, and in In 1973 merged with St Pius X Regional High School for girls (which it had previously shared a library with) and became Macleay Regional Catholic High School. In 1985, the name of the school was reverted back to its original name, St. Paul’s College.

== Notable alumni ==
- Albert Kelly, Rugby League player.
- Aiden Tolman, Rugby League player

== See also ==
- List of Catholic schools in New South Wales
- Catholic education in Australia
