= De La Salle College, Orange =

De La Salle College, Orange was a Catholic boys school in Summer Street, Orange, New South Wales, Australia.

== Patrician Brothers ==
The Patrician Brothers, an Irish order of Catholic teaching brothers, established a boys' school in Orange in 1890. Fourteen ex-students died in World War I.

The Patrician Brothers left Orange in 1927, when Bishop O'Farrell expelled the order from all schools in the Bathurst diocese following a dispute over syllabuses.

== De La Salle Brothers ==
The De La Salle Brothers arrived in 1928 to take over the school. Additions to the Summer Street site opened in 1937 with glass bricks "incorporating the most modern ideas in natural lighting," and a handball court in 1939. New classrooms were built in 1953.

In 1977 the school was absorbed into the co-educational James Sheahan Catholic High School.

== Notable alumni ==
- James Franklin, philosopher and historian
- John Ranch, Olympic rower
- Jack Renshaw, premier of New South Wales (attended Patrician Brothers)
