= Auburn, New South Wales =

Auburn
- Suburb
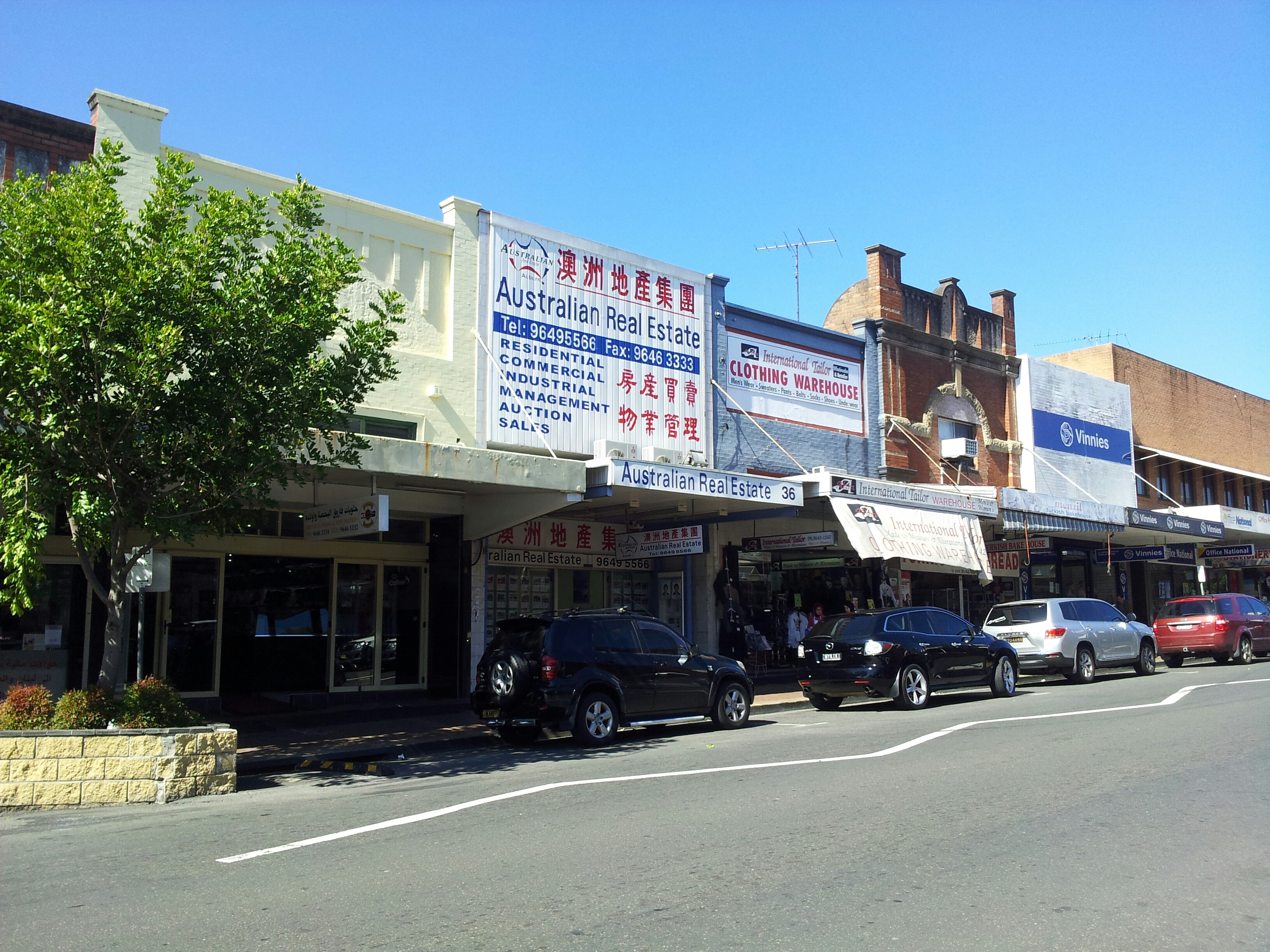
- Street scene in the town centre

- Interactive map of Auburn
- Country: Australia
- State: New South Wales
- LGA: Cumberland City Council
- Location: 16 km (9.9 mi) west of Sydney CBD
- Established: 1793

Government
  - State electorate: Auburn
  - Federal division: Blaxland
- Elevation: 23 m (75 ft)

Population
  - Total: 39,333 (2021 census)
- Postcode: 2144
Suburbs around Auburn
Clyde	Rosehill	Silverwater
South Granville	Auburn	Lidcombe
Sefton	Regents Park	Berala

Auburn is a Western Sydney suburb in the state of New South Wales, Australia. Auburn is located 16 kilometres (9.9 mi) west of the Sydney central business district and is in the local government area of Cumberland City Council, having previously been the administrative centre of Auburn Council. The suburb was named after Oliver Goldsmith's poem The Deserted Village, which describes 'Auburn' in England as the "loveliest village of the plain".

== History ==
=== Origins ===
The Auburn area was once used by Aboriginal people as a market place for the exchange of goods, a site for ritual battles and a 'Law Place' for ceremonies. The area was located on the border between the Darug inland group and the Eora/Dharawal coastal group. The Wangal and Wategoro, sub-groups or clans, are the groups most often recognised as the original inhabitants of the Auburn/Homebush Bay region.

Bennelong, one of the most famous Natives of the time, was a member of Wangal, as was his wife, Barangaroo. Pemulwuy, who organised tribes to resist the white settlement of the Sydney region from 1790 to 1802 was also a member of the Wangal.

On 5 February 1788, soon after the landing of Captain Phillip at Sydney Cove, Captain John Hunter and Lieutenant William Bradley sailed up what is now known as the Parramatta River, as far as Homebush Bay. Captain Hunter was the first European to set foot within the Auburn Local Government Area. Ten days later, the Governor, along with a well-armed party in three boats, reached Homebush Bay. They ventured about 3 kilometres (1.9 mi) inland. The following day a party of explorers traced the river in a westerly direction, coming to the place where the Duck River enters the Parramatta River. They explored the tributary as far as the depth of water permitted. Seeing what appeared to be ducks rising out of a swamp covered with reeds, they named the river Duck River. The ducks were actually Eastern Swamp Hens, but the name Duck River remained. The Eastern Swamp Hen featured prominently on the council's Coat of Arms and was part of the former Auburn City Council logo.

=== Settlement ===
In February 1793, Auburn area was established as the first free-agricultural settlement thanks to Governor Phillip's repeated applications to the British government for free settlers. Phillip was of the opinion that only free settlers with the assistance of convicts will be able to create an environment in which a country could support its inhabitants. Secretary Dundas endorsed Governor's opinion and secured an agreement with several farmers, some of whom were members of the Religious Society of Friends (Quakers), to settle in the colony. The first grants were given to Thomas Rose, Frederic Meredith, Thomas and Joseph Webb as well as Edward Powell. The deeds of the land described the farms' location as Liberty Plains and this is the name given to the neighbourhood of their farms by the first settlers, although the actual area bearing that name was a little further, lying at the upper part of Port Jackson. Dwellers of the Liberty Plains Parish were very proud of the fact that in the colony of felons they were the first people who came to Australia as free men and were given a privilege of choosing their own grants. This proud heritage is reflected in the motto on the Auburn coat of arms: "Liberty, with steady zeal".

In the late 1870s a "township" was surveyed "in the centre of the Liberty Plains… 11 miles from Sydney, on the Suburban Railway line" and divided into "fine township allotments all fronting grand wide streets". The subdivision was named 'Auburn', being a reference to Goldsmith's poem 'The Deserted Village'. The poem begins: "Sweet Auburn! Loveliest village of the plain". Advertisements for the sale of allotments in May 1878 quoted the poem and added: "So wrote the poet in years gone by in describing the 'Auburn' of Old England, and fitly does it describe the new Auburn of the Sunny South".

One of the early settlers in the area was Fred Chisholm, who had an estate west of the present site of Auburn railway station. In the 1880s, John Buchanan, a timber merchant, purchased land from Fred Chisholm and built his home, 'Duncraggarn Hall', a two-storey Italianate mansion with a central tower and elaborate wrought-iron balconies. In 1892, Buchanan sold his thirteen-acre estate to the Sisters of Charity, who turned the house into St Joseph's Hospital for Consumptives. In 1903, extensions to the hospital were constructed and the house itself became a convent for the sisters. Further modifications and extensions took place over the years, with the eventual result that the old hospital site became St Joseph's Village—a retirement village—with a modern hospital next door. 'Duncraggarn Hall' is heritage-listed.

=== Early 20th century ===
In the early 20th century, Auburn was still largely a rural area, with its economy based on agriculture, particularly dairy farming and market gardens. The suburb was part of the larger Parramatta area, which was developing as a transport hub due to the establishment of the Parramatta railway line. The area's proximity to the city of Sydney meant that it was within reach of industrial development, but it retained much of its agricultural character. The growth of a working-class community, tied to the industrial nature of the suburb, gave Auburn its identity as a blue-collar area.

The Great Depression affected Auburn in the early 1930s. The industrial sector faced significant challenges and unemployment rose. Many of the workers who had settled in Auburn during the 1920s faced hardship, particularly those working in manufacturing and construction. However, the industrial base in Auburn provided some flexibility, as factories continued to operate, albeit at reduced capacity.

During World War II, Auburn was subject to wartime rationing, and life was marked by shortages of goods, including food, clothing and petrol. The war also impacted daily life, as many men went off to fight, leaving women to take up roles in factories and other areas of work.

=== Auburn council ===
The formal Auburn Local Government Area was formed in 1948, when Auburn and Lidcombe Councils merged into Auburn Municipal Council. In 2006 it became the City of Auburn which in 2016 was split between other local government areas.

=== 20th to 21st century and immigration ===
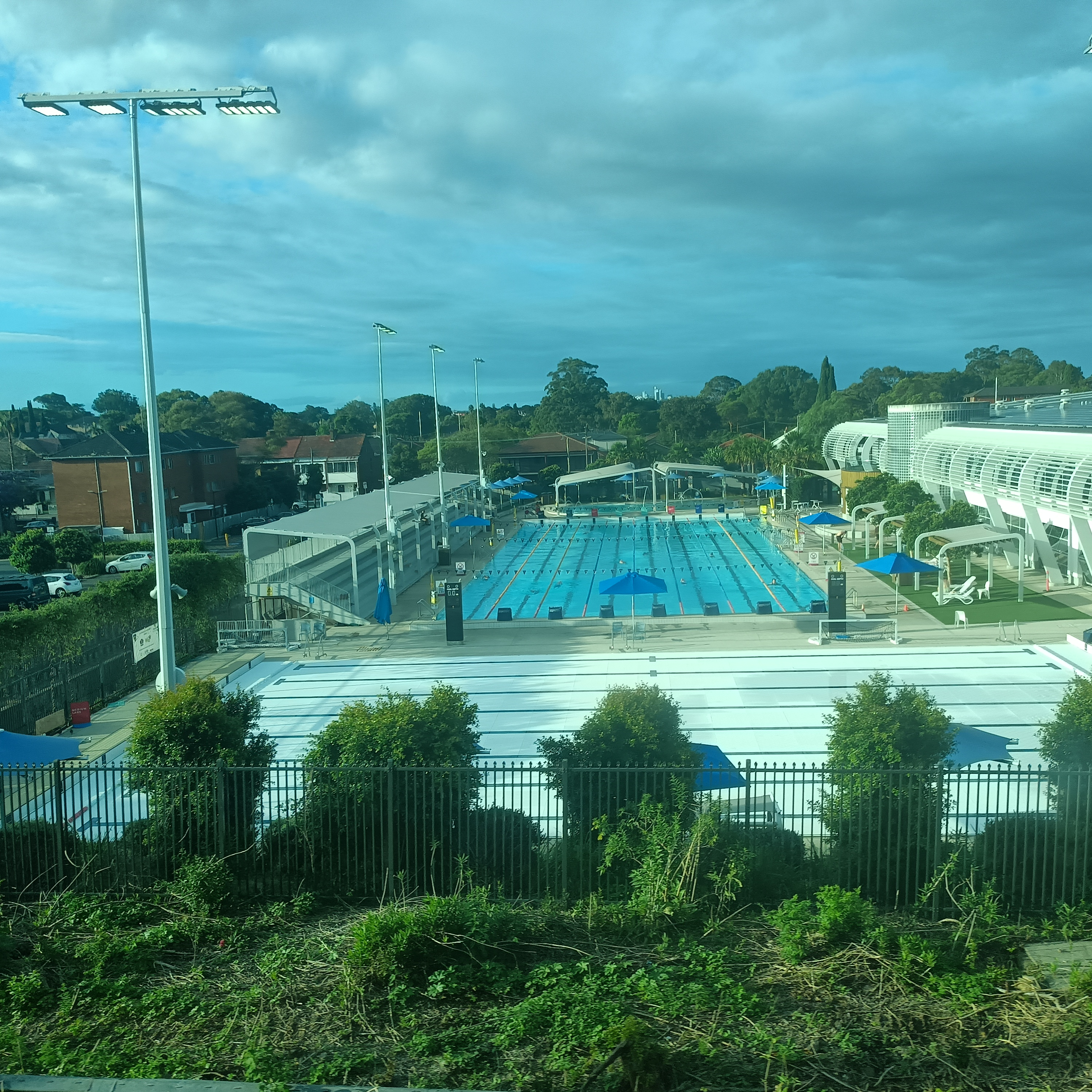
Auburn pool. 2026

In the late 20th and early 21st centuries, Auburn became a popular point of settlement for successive waves of immigrants. In the post-World War II era, immigrants from Ukraine, Russia, Italy and Greece settled in Auburn, who were succeeded in the 1960s by immigrants from Turkey and Vietnam. More recently, in the early of 21st century, a large number of immigrants have settled in Auburn from Bosnia and Herzegovina, China, South Korea, Nepal, Iran, Lebanon and Afghanistan. The history of immigrant settlement in Auburn has resulted in a suburb which is noted for its multicultural environment.

== Demographics ==
According to the 2021 census, there were 39,333 residents in Auburn. The most common reported ancestries were Chinese 21.8%, Nepalese 12.7%, Turkish 8.1%, Lebanese 6.2% and Indian 6.1%. 28.0% of people were born in Australia. The next most common countries of birth were China 14.4%, Nepal 12.7%, India 5.4%, Turkey 4.3% and Pakistan 3.7%. 12.2% of people only spoke English at home. Other languages spoken at home included Mandarin 14.1%, Nepali 12.6%, Arabic 10.5%, Turkish 7.5% and Urdu 6.8%. The most common responses for religious affiliation were Islam 38.5%, No Religion 17.3%, Hinduism 13.6%, Not stated 9.1% and Catholic 8.2%.

== Transport ==
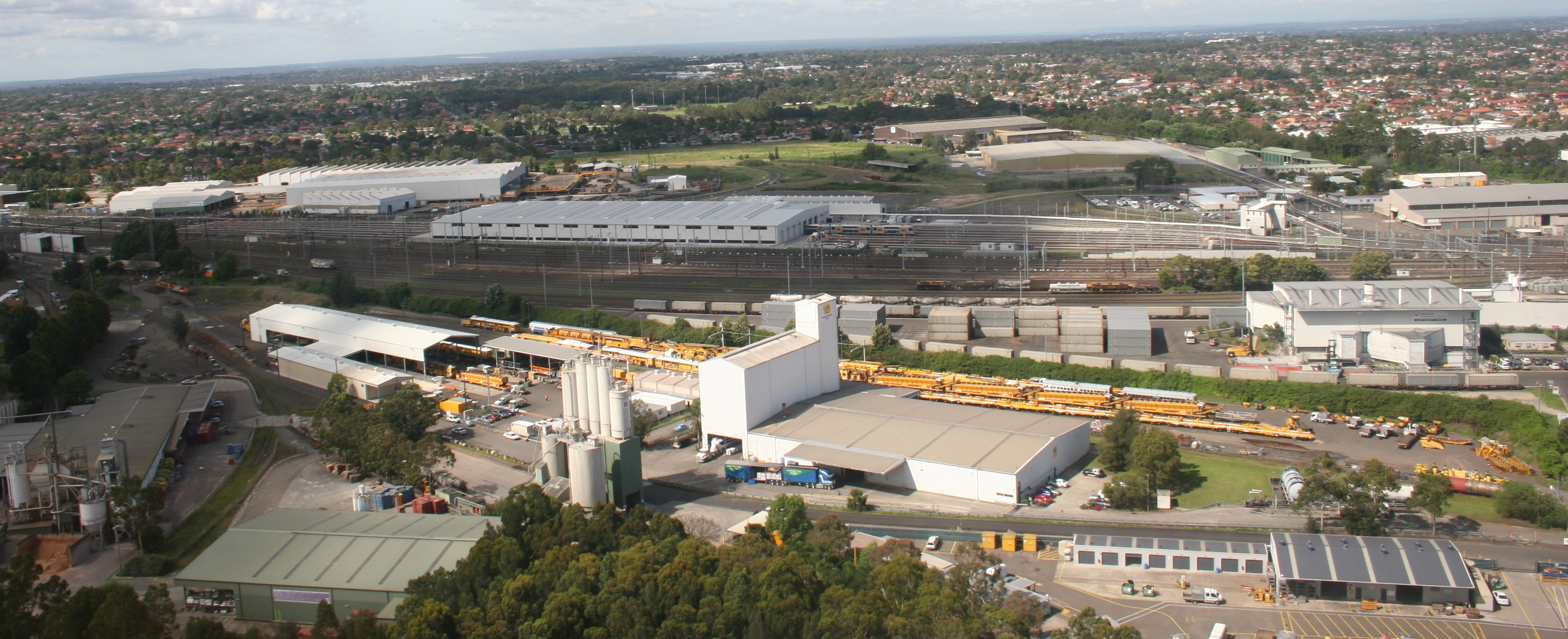
Railway storage and maintenance facilities at Auburn Maintenance Centre, near Auburn

=== Rail ===
Auburn railway station is on the Western and Leppington & Inner West lines of the Sydney Trains network, where there are frequent services.

The Auburn Maintenance Centre, a large maintenance and storage facility which services Sydney Trains rolling stock, is located to the northwest of the town centre, close to Clyde station.

=== Bus ===
Auburn also has a number of bus services, which service Auburn and the surrounding areas.

Busways operate two routes to and from Auburn station:

- 540: to Silverwater Correctional Complex
- 544: to Macquarie Centre

Transit Systems operates four routes via Auburn station:

- 908: Merrylands to Bankstown
- 909: Parramatta to Bankstown
- 911: to Bankstown
- S3: to Auburn Botanical Gardens

Auburn railway station is served by two NightRide routes:

- N60: Fairfield station to Town Hall station
- N61: Carlingford station to Town Hall station

== Heritage listings ==
Auburn has a number of heritage-listed sites, including:

- Great Southern and Western railway: Auburn Railway Signal Box
- 93 Parramatta Road: Electricity Substation No. 167

== Commercial area ==
Auburn has a mixture of residential, commercial and industrial areas. A commercial area is located close to Auburn railway station. There are many multicultural restaurants and cafes.

South of the railway station, the commercial area stretches for approximately 1 kilometre (0.62 mi) and features many shops, restaurants and supermarkets, including a number of shops and restaurants specialising in Middle Eastern, Turkish and East Asian products and cuisine. This reflects Auburn's history as a popular place of settlement for successive waves of immigrants in Sydney.

Some distance north of the town centre clustered around the railway station, commercial and industrial developments are also located along the length of Parramatta Road and surrounding streets.

It is home to the LFL team Auburn Wildcats who play in the Australian Eastern Conference as it is one of 6 teams in Sydney who represent this league. There are 40 teams in total of the LFL Australia and 12 are located in NSW.

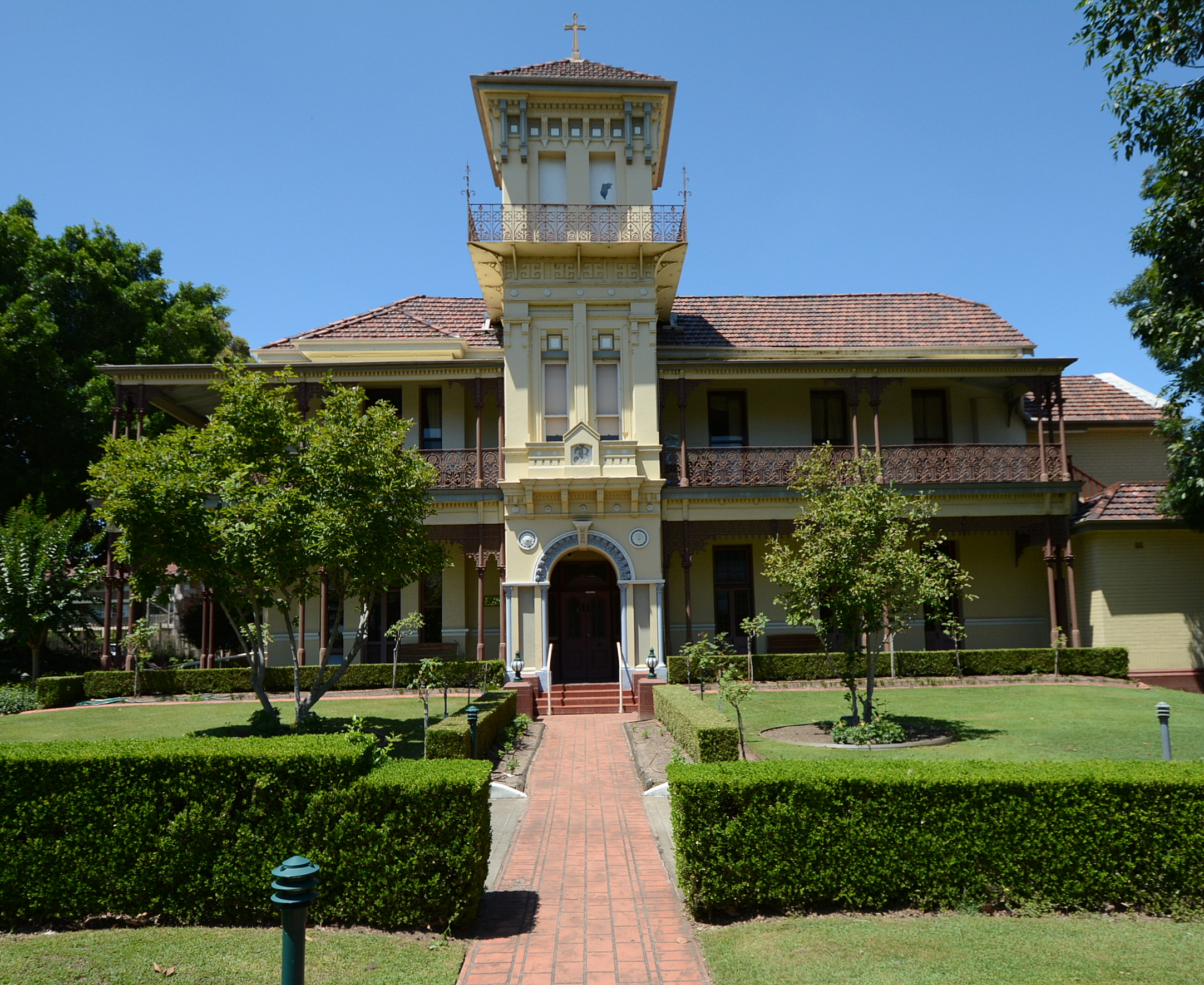
Duncraggarn Hall, a house now part of St Joseph's retirement village

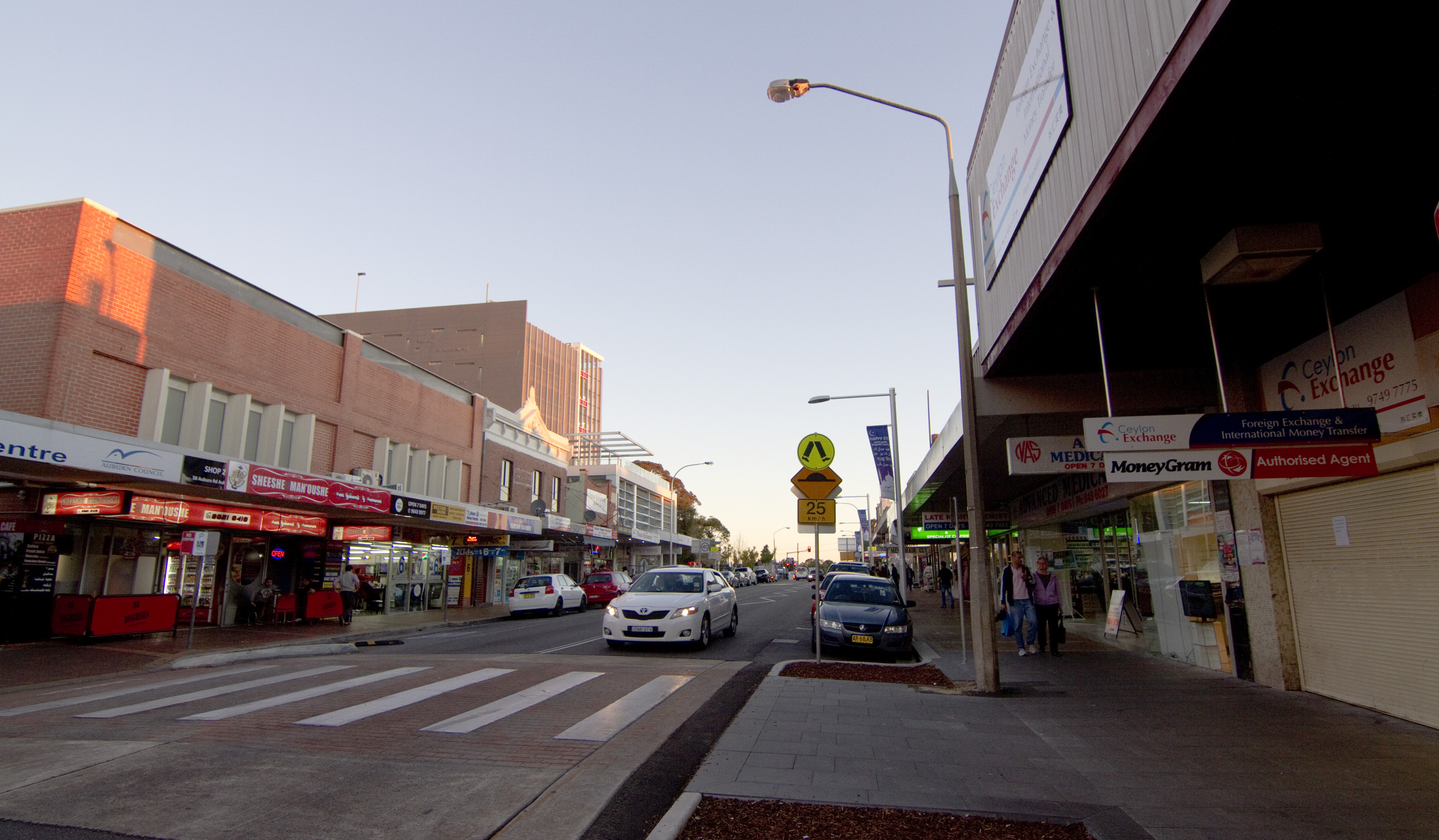
Street scene in the town centre

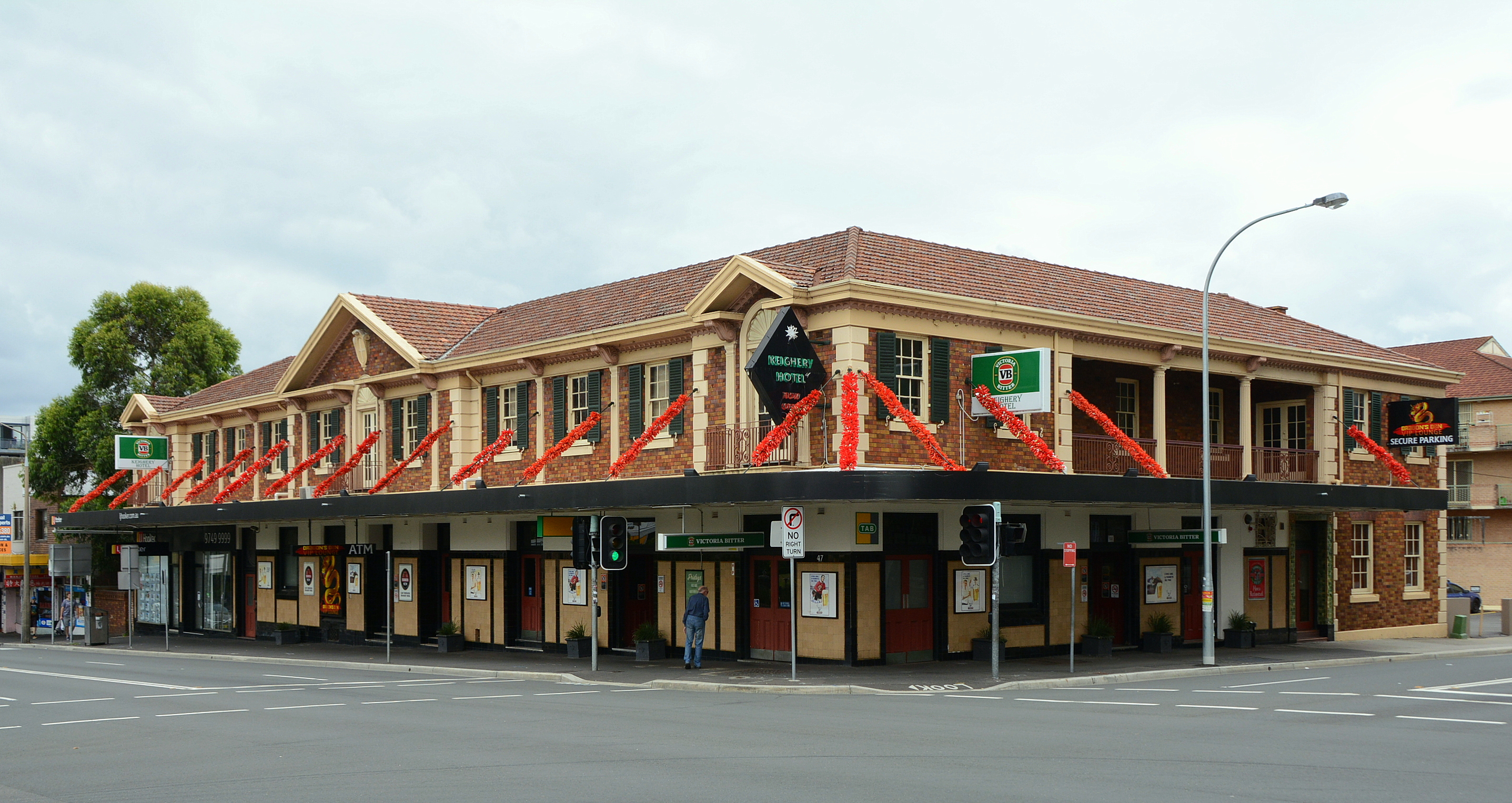
The Keighery Hotel, located close to the railway station

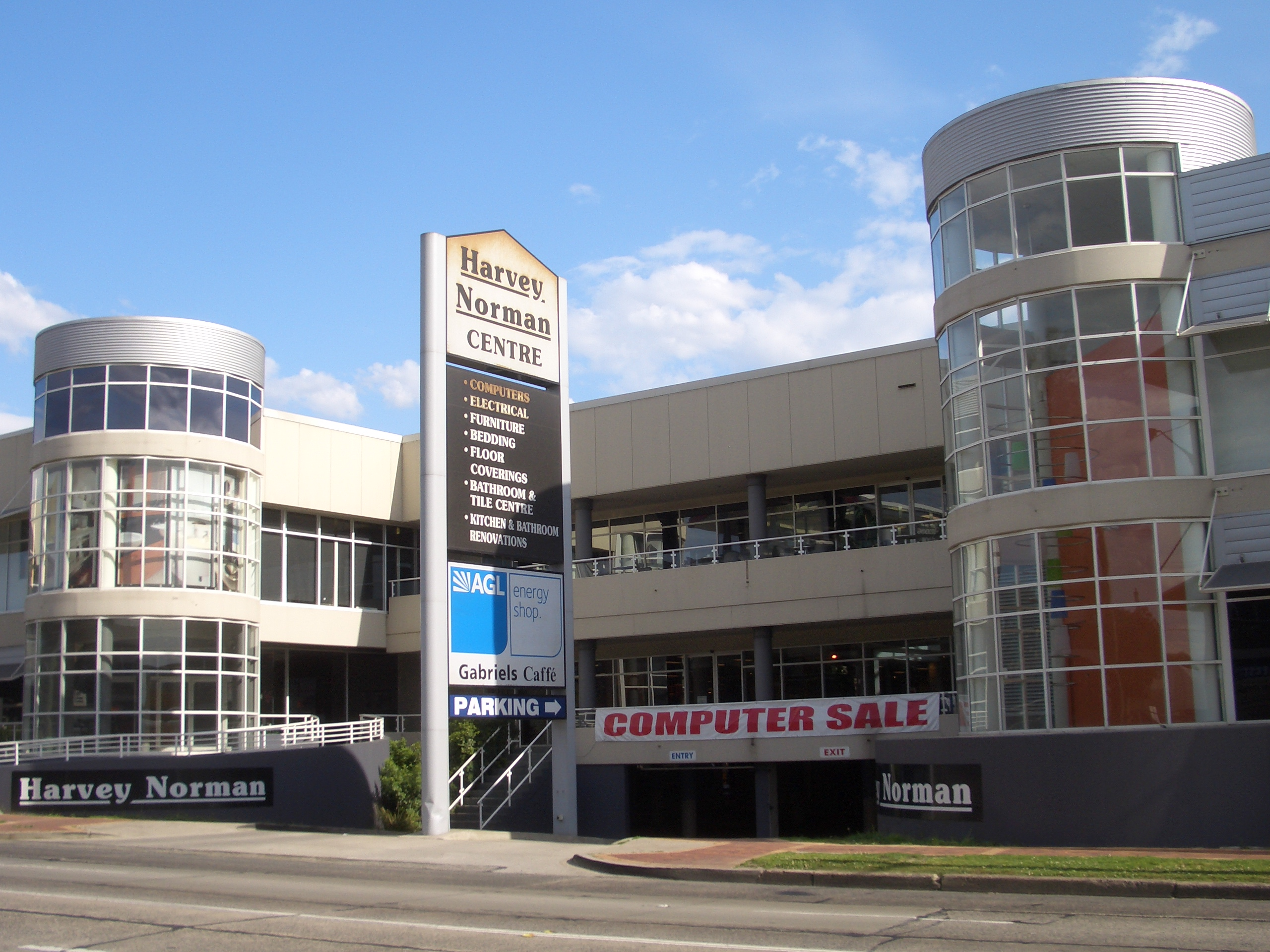
Harvey Norman Centre, Parramatta Road

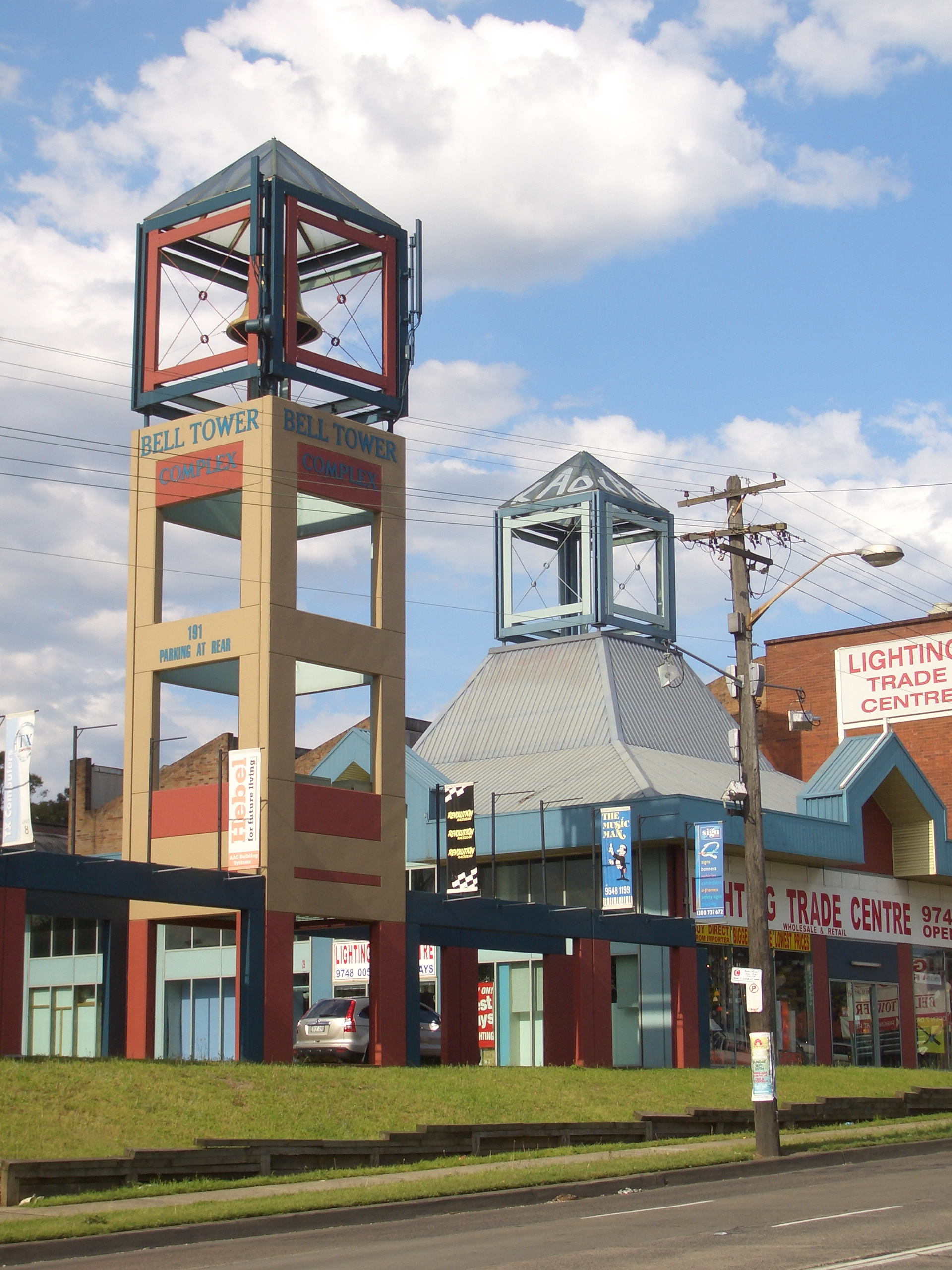
Bell Tower Complex, Parramatta Road

Nick Scali Centre, Parramatta Road

== Landmarks ==
- Auburn Hospital with basic 24-hour emergency facilities is on Norval and Hargrave Streets.
- Auburn Botanical Gardens

== Media ==
- The Auburn News and Granville Electorate Gazetteer, published 1903 to 1907

== Schools ==
- Al-Faisal College
- Alpha Omega Senior College
- Auburn Girls High School
- Auburn North Public School
- Auburn West Public School
- Auburn Public School
- Amity College (Auburn Campus)
- St John of God Primary school
- St Joseph The Worker Primary School
- Trinity Catholic College
- Sydney Adventist College, Auburn Campus

== Religious structures ==
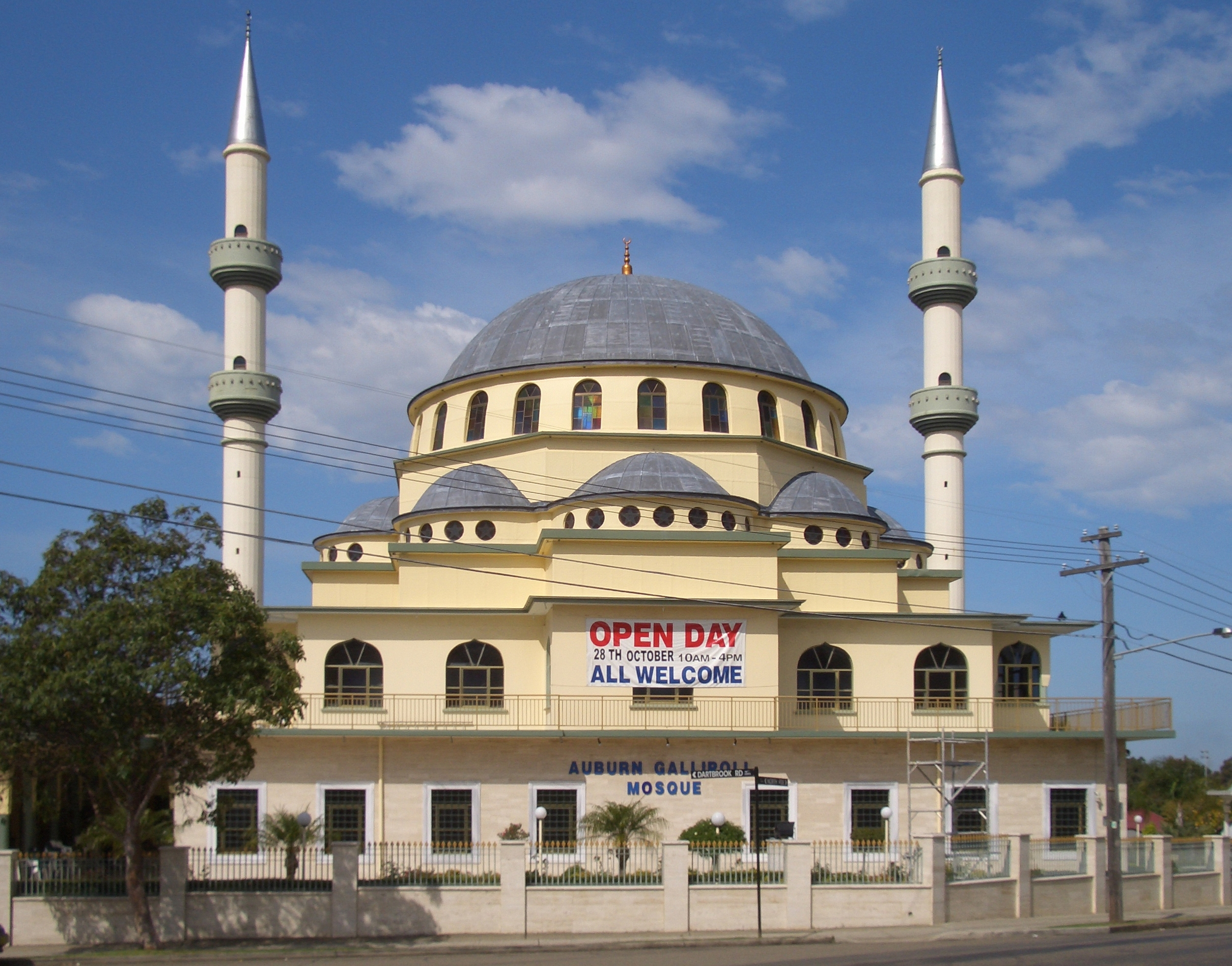
Auburn Gallipoli Mosque

The Auburn Baptist Church opened in 1888 and since 1928 has resided at its present location on Harrow Road.

The Sri Mandir in Auburn is Australia's oldest Hindu temple, having opened in 1977.

The Auburn Gallipoli Mosque took thirteen years to construct and was largely funded by the Turkish community in the area. The name of the mosque reflects the legacy of Gallipoli in Turkey and the shared bond between Australian society and the Australian Turkish Muslim Community who constructed the mosque

== Notable people ==
- Chris Bath, television and radio journalist
- John Benaud, Australian test cricketer
- Hippolyte De La Rue, Senior RAAF Commander
- Ahmad Elrich, football (soccer)
- Tarek Elrich, football (soccer)
- Brad Fittler, former professional rugby league player, coach, and sportscaster, born in Auburn.
- Alex Gersbach, football (soccer)
- Jamal Idris, rugby league player
- Scott Jamieson, football (soccer)
- Tomi Juric, football (soccer)
- Jack Lang, former Premier of NSW (1925–1927, 1930–1932), had a long and close association with Auburn, setting up a successful real estate business there. He went on to serve on the local council, eventually becoming Mayor. He died in Auburn in 1975
- Feleti Mateo, rugby league player
- Salim Mehajer, suspended deputy mayor of Auburn City Council. Attracted national infamy for his grossly exuberant wedding, criminal record, allegations of corruption and electoral fraud.
- Grant Millington, rugby league player
- John Moulton was a general surgeon in Auburn
- Warren Mundine, the first Indigenous president of the Australian Labor Party. Born in Grafton in 1956, Warren and his family lived in Auburn in the mid-1960s.
- Lelea Paea, rugby league and rugby union player
- Lopini Paea, rugby league player
- Mickey Paea, rugby league player
- Stanley Llewellyn Perry, Lieutenant-Colonel of the 48th Battalion during World War I
- Garry Rush, racing driver
- Myuran Sukumaran (1981–2015), executed drug trafficker and co-ringleader of the Bali Nine
- Zeb Taia, rugby league player
- Kelepi Tanginoa, rugby league player
- Tevita Tatola, rugby league player with South Sydney Rabbitohs
- Anthony Watmough, rugby league player

== Pop culture ==
- SBS television drama East West 101 was filmed in Auburn.
