= Leuluai =

Leuluai is a Samoan surname. Notable people with the surname include:

- James Leuluai (born 1957), New Zealand rugby league player
- Kylie Leuluai (born 1978), New Zealand rugby league player
- Macgraff Leuluai (born 1990), New Zealand rugby league player
- Phillip Leuluai (born 1977), New Zealand-born Samoan international rugby league player
- Thomas Leuluai (born 1985), New Zealand rugby league player
- Vincent Leuluai (born 1995), Australian rugby league player
