= Minto Cobras =

Australian rugby league club, based in Minto, NSW

Minto Cobras RLFC
Club information
- Full name: Minto Cobras Rugby League Football Club
- Colours: Red; Black
- Founded: 1970; 56 years ago

Current details
- Ground: Benham Reserve, Minto
- Competition: Sydney Combined Competition, Western Suburbs District Junior Rugby League

Minto Cobras Rugby League Football Club is an Australian rugby league football club based in Minto, New South Wales. In 2009 their clubhouse was burnt down and were forced to relocate. They are one of the strongest junior clubs in the Campbelltown area and have produced quality first graders and internationals.

== Notable players ==
- Justin Brooker 1996-02 (Sydney Roosters, Western Suburbs Magpies, Bradford Bulls, Wakefield Trinity Wildcats, South Sydney Rabbitohs)
- Matt Fuller
- John Skandalis 1996-10 (Western Suburbs Magpies & Wests Tigers)
- Ken McGuinness 1994-02 (Western Suburbs Magpies, Wests Tigers & North Queensland Cowboys)
- Kevin McGuinness 1995-07 (Western Suburbs Magpies, Wests Tigers & Manly Sea Eagles)
- Makasini Richter 2001-05 (West Tigers & Canterbury Bulldogs)
- Reece Simmonds 2002-11 (St George Illawarra Dragons & South Sydney Rabbitohs)
- Gray Viane 2003-07 (Wests Tigers, Castleford Tigers & Salford Red Devils)
- Lelea Paea 2003-07 (Sydney Roosters & Gold Coast Titans)
- Lopini Paea 2003-16 (Sydney Roosters)
- Mickey Paea 2005-19 (Sydney Roosters, St George Illawarra Dragons, Canterbury Bulldogs & Newcastle Knights)
- Michael Lett 2005-11 (Sydney Roosters, St George Illawarra Dragons, Canterbury Bulldogs)
- Jarryd Hayne (2006-18 (Parramatta Eels & Gold Coast Titans)
- Israel Folau 2007-10 (Melbourne Storm & Brisbane Broncos)
- Krisnan Inu (2007- (Parramatta Eels, New Zealand Warriors & Canterbury Bulldogs)
- Tim Lafai 2011- (Canterbury Bulldogs & St George Illawarra Dragons)
- John Folau 2015 (Parramatta Eels)
- Vincent Leuluai 2016- (Sydney Roosters & Melbourne Storm)
