= Sydney Adventist College =

Location
- Auburn, Sydney, New South Wales; Australia
- 33°50′53″S 151°01′59″E

Information
- Type: Independent co-educational early learning and primary day school
- Denomination: Seventh-Day Adventist
- Established: 1917; 109 years ago
- Principal: Mr Hetfield
- Years: Early learning to Year 6
- Colours: Blue, charcoal, white
- Slogan: Nurture for Today, Learning for Tomorrow, Character for Eternity.
- Website: auburn.adventist.edu.au

Sydney Adventist College is an independent Seventh-day Adventist co-educational early learning and primary day school, located in Auburn, an inner-western suburb of Sydney, New South Wales, Australia.

Established in 1917 at Burwood, Sydney Adventist College was open to students from all religious and cultural backgrounds. Since December 2012 it has only catered to Prep to Year 6 students at the Macquarie Street Auburn Campus. The School is operated by the Greater Sydney Conference (GSC). It is a part of the Seventh-day Adventist education system, the world's second largest Christian school system.

The school is affiliated with the health food company Sanitarium, The Adventist Development and Relief Agency (ADRA), the Sydney Adventist Hospital and the Seventh-day Adventist Churches in Sydney. It is also related to Avondale University College, a tertiary college located in Cooranbong.

== History ==
The Strathfield Adventist High School Crest (1959-1967)

The school first opened as 'Burwood Adventist High School' with 20 students in 1919 at Patterson Street, Concord, an inner-western suburb in Sydney. The school was conducted by the former Australasian Union Conference. It opened as an intermediate school as a gateway for the several Adventist primary schools in Sydney and Avondale College. In 1922 the school was a secondary department for what was then, Auburn Adventist Primary School (now, Sydney Adventist College, Auburn Campus). In 1937 a property was purchased at Burwood and the school moved there. The school provided Years 7, 8 and 9, having approximately 50 students. Enrolment rose rapidly to over 120 students and the school found it was in need of a newer and larger location. In 1952, the school was opened in Albert Road, Strathfield as Burwood Adventist High School. The building was a single-storey building in a 'U' shape. In 1965, junior high students from Wahroonga Adventist School and Marrickville Adventist School (now, Hurstville Adventist School) were all transferred to Burwood Adventist High School due to overcrowding, the high school system at Wahroonga and Hurstville schools ceased. The school then had its name changed to Strathfield Adventist High School. In 1966 the school was in need of major extensions, therefore the second-storey and basement floors were built on above and below of the existing single storey. In 1967, the school was again increasing in numbers and was in need of more classrooms. The East Wing was then built, as well as extensions to the "U" building. The school had developed into a full high school system and was renamed Sydney Adventist High School in the same year. In 1973 the new and larger two-storey library was built. The School Activity Centre and Technology and Applied Studies Building was opened in 1984. The Library later needed extensions, and that addition was completed in 1995.

In 1993 Sydney Adventist High School was renamed Sydney Adventist College. The school motto was also changed together with the name change, from Nihil Sine Labore (Nothing without labour) to Nihil Sine Deo (Nothing without God). Extensions were also completed at the front of the school for the Administration office and Student Services office in 2005.

The high school closed in 2012. On 13 June 2012, a letter was sent out to all the members of school from the Adventist Education Board announcing the proposed closure of Sydney Adventist College at the end of the school year due to financial difficulties within the Seventh-Day Adventist Schools (Greater Sydney) Ltd system. The site of the Sydney Adventist College was acquired by the government and in 2014, the Marie Bashir Public School was opened on the site.

The Auburn campus remained open and become a K–6 primary school from January 2013 onwards.

== School campus ==
The campus consists of a large two-storey building, a large playing field, a basketball court, six handball courts, a medium-sized playground and sandpit, and a small field.

== Spiritual aspects ==
All students take religion classes each year that they are enrolled. These classes cover topics in biblical history and Christian and denominational doctrines. Instructors in other disciplines also begin each class period with prayer or a short devotional thought, many which encourage student input. Weekly, the entire student body gathers together for an hour-long chapel service. Outside the classrooms there is year-round spiritually oriented programming that relies on student involvement.

== Sports ==
The school offers soccer for boys and girls; and basketball for boys and girls.

== See also ==
- Seventh-day Adventist education
- List of non-government schools in New South Wales
- List of Seventh-day Adventist secondary schools
