= Mickey Paea =

Tonga international rugby league footballer

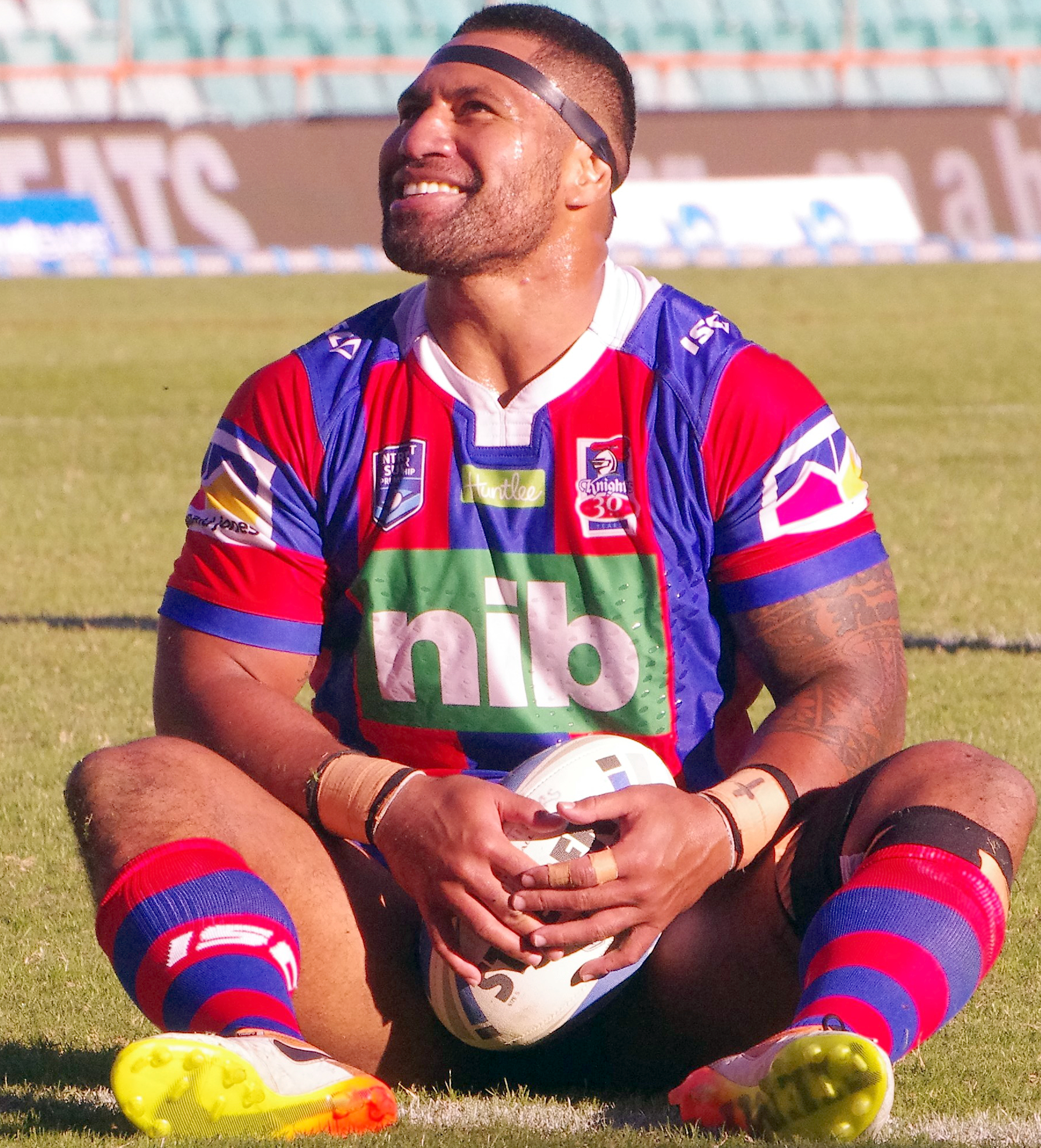

Personal information
- Born: 25 March 1986 (age 40) Auburn, New South Wales, Australia

Playing information
- Height: 183 cm (6 ft 0 in)
- Weight: 110 kg (17 st 5 lb)
- Position: Prop
Club
Years	Team	Pld	T	G	FG	P
2005–08	Sydney Roosters	22	1	0	0	4
2009	St. George Illawarra	6	0	0	0	0
2010–11	Canterbury Bulldogs	28	1	0	0	4
2012–13	Hull Kingston Rovers	54	6	0	0	24
2014–15	Hull F.C.	42	3	0	0	12
2016–17	Newcastle Knights	20	0	0	0	0
2018–19	Hull F.C.	51	6	0	0	24
	Total	223	17	0	0	68
Representative
Years	Team	Pld	T	G	FG	P
2006–13	Tonga	12	1	0	0	4
2013	Exiles	1	1	0	0	4
- Relatives: Lopini Paea (brother); Lelea Paea (brother); Eddie Paea (cousin)

Mickey Paea (born 25 March 1986) is a former Tonga international rugby league footballer who played as a prop.

He previously played for the Sydney Roosters, St. George Illawarra Dragons, Canterbury-Bankstown Bulldogs and the Newcastle Knights in the NRL. He played for Hull Kingston Rovers and Hull F.C. in two separate spells in the Super League.

== Background ==
Paea was born in Auburn, New South Wales, Australia.

Paea is of Tongan descent and played his junior rugby league for the Minto Cobras, before being signed by the Sydney Roosters.

Paea is the younger brother of former Sydney Roosters players Lopini Paea and Lelea Paea.

== Playing career ==
=== Sydney Roosters ===
In round 15 of the 2005 NRL season, Paea made his NRL début for the Roosters against the Cronulla-Sutherland Sharks at Toyota Park.

Although only playing 4 games for the Roosters in 2005, Paea went on to captain the Junior Kangaroos and claimed the Junior Rep Player of the Year at the Roosters awards night.

In 2006, Paea made his international début for Tonga against Samoa.

He played in the 2006 NSW Cup grand final for Newtown who were the Sydney Roosters feeder club at the time against Parramatta. Newtown would lose the grand final 20-19 at Stadium Australia.

In August 2008, Paea was named in the Tongan training squad for the 2008 Rugby League World Cup, and in October 2008 he was named in the final 24-man squad.

=== St. George Illawarra Dragons ===
On 16 September 2008, Paea signed a one-year contract with the St. George Illawarra Dragons starting in 2009. He made his Dragons début in Townsville, in Round 9 of the 2009 NRL season against the North Queensland Cowboys.

On 23 May 2009, Paea was the subject of a controversial racial vilification dispute with Cronulla-Sutherland Sharks captain, Paul Gallen, late in the local derby played between the Dragons and Sharks. Gallen, who took objection to Paea accidentally stepping on his hand in a tackle, got up and called Paea a "black cunt". Paea's angry response was caught by television cameras and microphones, but he did not wish to take the matter further after the match. After the match, Paea said, "But then something told me to just forget about it and to just move on. Things happen on the field and you don't want to get too personal about it. But I've been getting different kinds of reactions. After the game I had my church friends sending me messages saying, 'You handled it really well, it was very Kingdom the way you dealt with it'. Then I had other mates saying, 'You should have smashed him'."

Nevertheless, the NRL decided to step in and issued a $10,000 fine to Gallen.

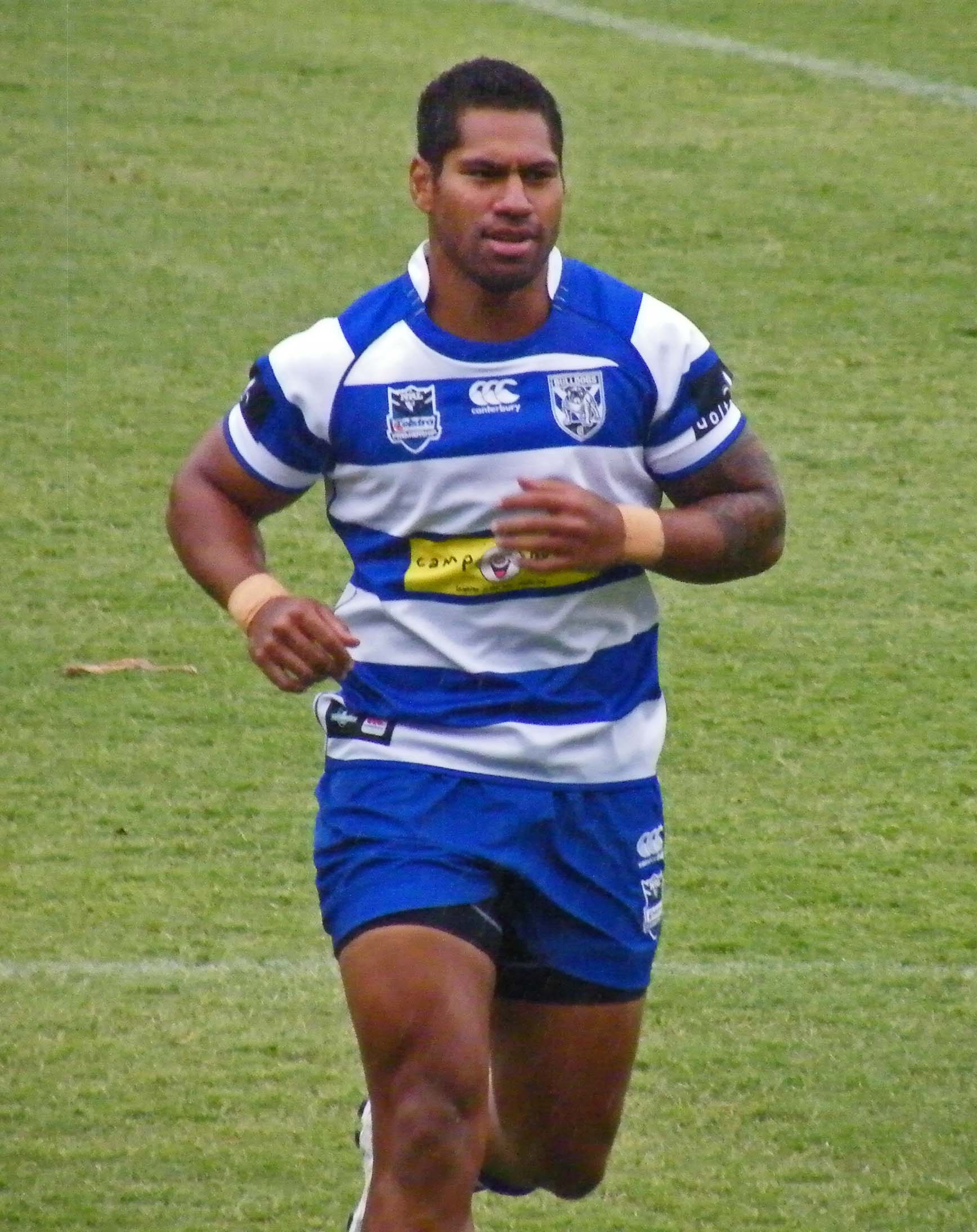
Paea playing for the Bulldogs

=== Canterbury-Bankstown Bulldogs ===
On 13 August 2009, Paea signed a two-year contract with the Canterbury-Bankstown Bulldogs starting in 2010. He went on to make 16 appearances in 2010 and 12 appearances in 2011.

=== Hull Kingston Rovers ===
On 6 October 2011, Paea signed a two-year contract with Hull Kingston Rovers to move to the Super League starting in 2012.

In October and November, Paea played for Tonga in the 2013 Rugby League World Cup.

=== Hull F.C. ===
On 28 June 2013, Paea signed a 2-year contract with Hull KR's cross-town rivals Hull F.C. starting in 2014.

=== Newcastle Knights ===
On 22 May 2015, Paea signed a two-year contract with the Newcastle Knights starting in 2016, to return to the National Rugby League after four years in England.

Paea's two seasons at Newcastle saw the club finish with back to back Wooden Spoon's.

=== Return to Hull F.C. ===
In August 2017, Paea signed a signed a two-year contract with Hull F.C., to return to the Super League in 2018.
