= Eddie Paea =

Former Tonga dual-code & Niue international rugby league footballer

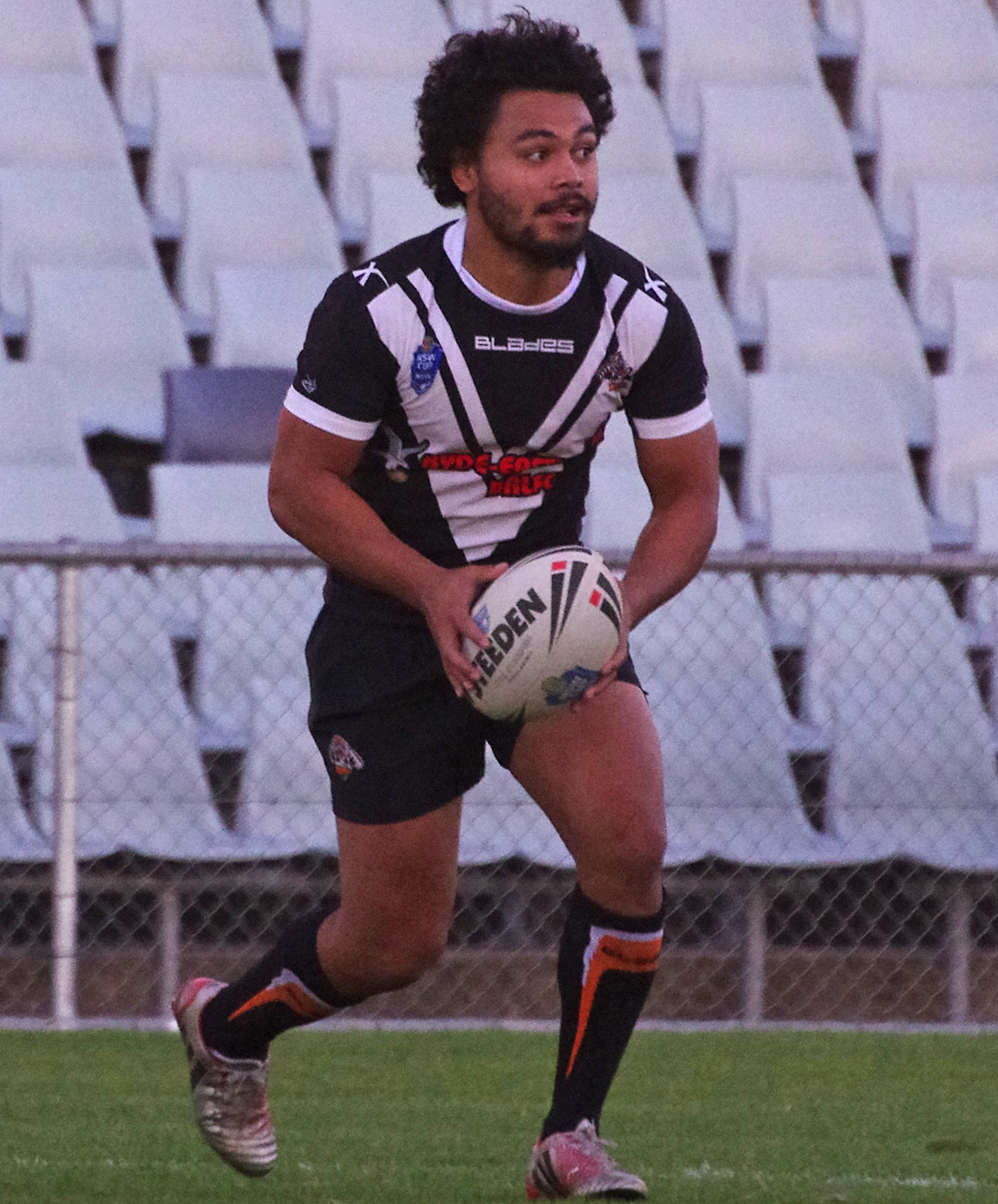

Personal information
- Born: 8 February 1988 (age 38) Sydney, New South Wales, Australia
- Height: 178 cm (5 ft 10 in)
- Weight: 88 kg (13 st 12 lb)

Playing information

Rugby league
- Position: Halfback, Hooker
Club
Years	Team	Pld	T	G	FG	P
2006–08	South Sydney	8	3	1	0	14
Representative
Years	Team	Pld	T	G	FG	P
2008–10	Tonga	7	1	6	0	16
2018	Niue	3	0	7	0	14

Rugby union
Representative
Years	Team	Pld	T	G	FG	P
2011–12	Tonga	2	0	0	0	0
- Source: As of 10 November 2017
- Relatives: Mickey Paea (cousin); Lelea Paea (cousin); Lopini Paea (cousin)

Edmond "Eddie" Paea (born 8 February 1988) is a dual-code rugby international rugby footballer for Tonga. Beginning his professional career playing rugby league with the South Sydney Rabbitohs in the National Rugby League, Paea made his debut for the Tongan rugby league team at the 2008 Rugby League World Cup, before changing to rugby union and representing the Tongan rugby union team. Eddie currently plays for his junior team, the Mascot Juniors RLFC in the A Grade South Sydney Junior Rugby League competition which Eddie returned to in 2019.

== Background ==
Paea was born in Sydney, New South Wales, Australia.

== Rugby league career ==
Paea made his NRL debut for the Rabbitohs in round 26 of the 2006 season against the Wests Tigers. A Junior Kiwi representative, Paea was named in Tonga's squad for the 2008 World Cup. Paea scored his first senior international try in the World Cup match against Scotland on 8 November 2008. He also converted one try. Paea spent the majority of his time whilst contracted with South Sydney playing for their feeder team, the North Sydney Bears, in the NSW Cup. Paea made a total of 42 appearances for Norths, scoring 15 tries, kicking 79 goals and scoring a total of 218 points.

International caps
Cap	Date	Team	Venue	Opponent	Competition	T	G	FG	Points
1	18 October 2008	Tonga	Mt Smart Stadium, Auckland	New Zealand		0	0	0	0
2	31 October 2008	Tonga	Penrith Stadium, Sydney	Samoa	2008 World Cup	0	0	0	0
3	8 November 2008	Tonga	Browne Park, Rockhampton	Scotland	2008 World Cup	1	1	0	6
4	14 October 2009	Tonga	Rotorua International Showground, Rotorua	New Zealand		0	2	0	4
5	25 October 2009	Tonga	Lloyd Robson Oval, Port Moresby	Papua New Guinea	2009 Pacific Cup	0	1	0	2
6	31 October 2009	Tonga	Lloyd Robson Oval, Port Moresby	Fiji	2009 Pacific Cup	0	1	0	2
7	24 October 2010	Tonga	Parramatta Stadium, Sydney	Samoa		0	1	0	2
8	4 October 2018	Niue	St Marys Stadium, Sydney	Malta	2018 Emerging Nations World Championship	0	3	0	6
9	10 October 2018	Niue	New Era Stadium, Sydney	Greece	2018 Emerging Nations World Championship	0	2	0	4
10	13 October 2018	Niue	St Marys Stadium, Sydney	Malta	2018 Emerging Nations World Championship	0	2	0	4

== Rugby union career ==
Paea played Rugby Union in Krasnoyarsk Russia for Krasny Yar as a first-5. They are currently the holders of the Russian Cup and were the 2015 Russian Champions.

International caps
Cap	Date	Venue	Opponent	Competition	T	G	FG	Points
1	8 June 2011	Surrey	United States	2011 Churchill Cup	0	0	0	0
2	23 June 2012	Churchill Park, Lautoka	Fiji	2012 Pacific Nations Cup	0	0	0	0
