= Auburn Hospital =

- Western Sydney Local Health District

Geography
- Location: Auburn, NSW, Australia
- Coordinates: 33.8605°S 151.0336°E

Organisation
- Care system: Public Medicare (AU)
- Type: District General, Community

Services
- Emergency department: Yes
- Beds: 155

History
- Opened: November 1907

Links
- Website: Auburn Hospital
- Lists: Hospitals in Australia

Auburn Hospital is a 155-bed community hospital in Auburn, a western suburb of Sydney, New South Wales, Australia. It provides basic 24-hour emergency facilities, as well as a medical, surgical, paediatrics, and maternity facilities as well as coronary care and intensive care facilities.

This facility is part of the Western Sydney Local Health District (WSLHD) and near the eastern border of the former Sydney West Area Health Service (SWAHS; now South West Sydney Local Health District, SWSLHD).

Auburn Health is an Australian Council of Health Care Standards (ACHS)-accredited organisation.

As of 2010, Auburn Hospital is a teaching hospital for the University of Notre Dame Sydney School of Medicine.

== History ==
Auburn Hospital was first opened as the "Granville Electorate Cottage Hospital" in November 1907.
