= The Auburn News and Granville Electorate Gazetteer =

The Auburn News and Granville Electorate Gazetteer was an English-language local newspaper published from 1903 to 1907 in Auburn, Sydney, Australia, circulating in Auburn, Rookwood, Silverwater, Newington, Clyde, Granville, Bankstown, Parramatta, in Sydney, as well as other metropolitan, interstate and overseas locations. The masthead proclaimed that the paper had "No sect, creed or party but for the good of all." The paper primarily reported on social, community, sporting and local government activities in the Granville Electorate, including the towns of Auburn, Rookwood, Granville and Bankstown, and included local business and classified advertising.

== History ==
The Auburn News and Granville Electorate Gazetteer was first published on Saturday, 23 May 1903, as an eight-page quarto newspaper, published weekly on Saturdays by Bancroft & Co., at their printing works in Auburn Road, Auburn. The paper was available at a cost of 1 penny.

From issue 18, published on Saturday 19 September 1903, The Auburn News and Granville Electorate Gazetteer was reduced to a four-page 16 column tabloid format and the volume number changed from I to II.

In March 1904, Bancroft & Co. moved their office, printing works and store to a larger premises, located next to Lang and Dawes real estate office in Auburn Road. Bancroft also advised readers of his intention to increase the number of columns in the newspaper from 16 to 32, covering extra costs with increased subscriptions and advertising. The newspaper increased to an eight-page publication from issue Vol. III, No. 57, dated Saturday, 18 June 1804.

Bancroft & Co. secured a lease of the "Town Hall Buildings" in Auburn Road, Auburn, from the Auburn Borough Council. The company relocated there on Sunday 21 August 1904, with the first issue of The Auburn News and Granville Electorate Gazetteer printed at the new premises being Vol. III, No. 67, dated Saturday, 27 August 1904.

From issue Vol. IV, No. 112, dated Saturday, 8 July 1905, The Auburn News and Granville Electorate Gazetteer was reduced to six pages; and further reduced to a four-page publication from issue Vol. IV, No. 117, dated Saturday, 12 August 1905.

The Auburn News and Granville Electorate Gazetteer ceased publication around January 1907, with the proprietor Mr J. H. Bancroft, writing to Auburn Municipal Council asking to be "exonerated from further liability as a tenant of the council." Alderman Charles Dyer, Mayor of Auburn, reported at the council meeting of 14 January 1907, that "he had been told one morning that the whole of the ‘Auburn News’ had disappeared in a cart," and that he had taken possession of the premises and the remaining fittings.

== Availability ==
Hardcopy of The Auburn News and Granville Electorate Gazetteer, from issues Vol. II, No. 18, dated Saturday, 19 September 1903, through to Vol. IV, No. 134, Saturday, 30 December 1905, is held by the State Library of New South Wales in onsite storage at the State Reference Library.

Gosford Micrographics Pty Ltd filmed the surviving issues of The Auburn News and Granville Electorate Gazetteer, onto a single reel of microfilm in April 2000. This microfilm can be viewed at the State Library of New South Wales, and the library services of Cumberland Council and the City of Parramatta Council.

All surviving issues of The Auburn News and Granville Electorate Gazetteer are available online via the National Library of Australia Trove digitised newspaper website.

== See also ==
- List of newspapers in Australia
- List of defunct newspapers of Australia
- List of newspapers in New South Wales
