= Tim Lafai =

Samoa international rugby league footballer

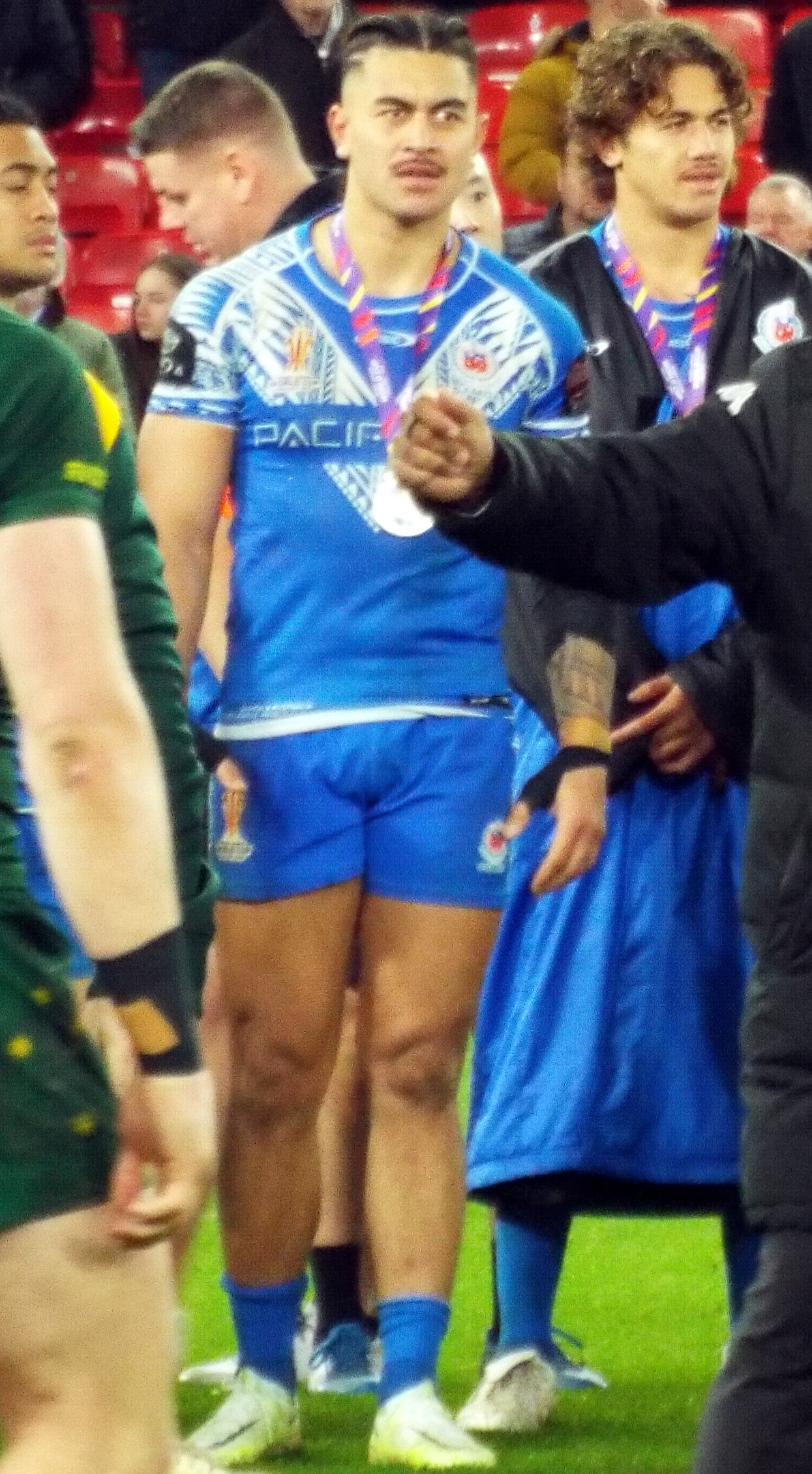

Personal information
- Full name: Timoteo Lafai
- Born: 27 May 1991 (age 35) Savaii, Samoa
- Height: 6 ft 0 in (1.84 m)
- Weight: 14 st 11 lb (94 kg)

Playing information
- Position: Centre
Club
Years	Team	Pld	T	G	FG	P
2011–15	Canterbury Bulldogs	74	30	6	0	132
2016–20	St. George Illawarra	91	18	19	0	112
2020	Canterbury Bulldogs	5	2	1	0	10
2022–25	Salford Red Devils	69	22	0	0	88
	Total	239	72	26	0	342
Representative
Years	Team	Pld	T	G	FG	P
2013–25	Samoa	18	9	7	0	50
2019	Samoa 9s	4	1	4	0	12
- Source: As of 16 April 2025
- Education: Sarah Redfern High School
- Relatives: Atasi Lafai (sister)

Timoteo Lafai (born 27 May 1991) is a retired Samoan rugby league footballer, who last played as a centre for the Salford Red Devils in the Super League, and Samoa at international level..

He previously played for the St. George Illawarra Dragons and the Canterbury-Bankstown Bulldogs over two separate spells in the NRL.

== Early years ==
Lafai was born in Savaii, Samoa, and moved to Auckland, New Zealand as a 6-year old before immigrating to Sydney, New South Wales, Australia as a 9-year old.

Lafai attended Sarah Redfern High School, graduating in 2009 while playing his junior football for the Minto Cobras, and Campbelltown Warriors. In 2007, Lafai played for the Western Suburbs Magpies Harold Matthews team before being signed by the South Sydney Rabbitohs. Lafai played for the Rabbitohs SG Ball team and also played for the Campbelltown Eagles in the Bundaberg Red Cup. After the 2009 season, Lafai signed a 1-year contract with the Canterbury-Bankstown Bulldogs. Lafai played for the Bulldogs Toyota Cup team in 2010 and 2011, scoring 17 tries and 17 goals in 32 games.

== Playing career ==
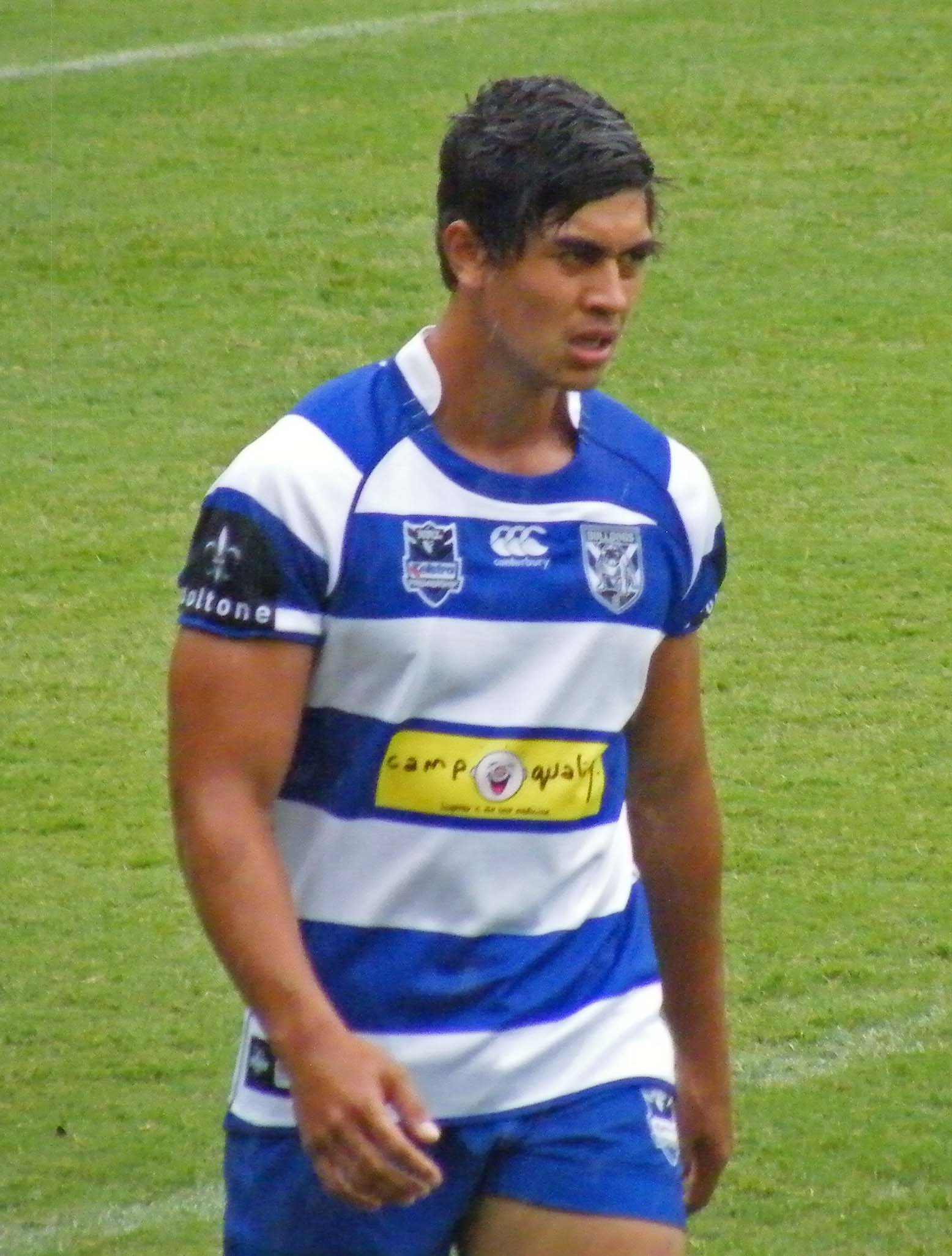
Lafai playing for the Bulldogs in 2011

=== 2011 ===
In round 2 of the 2011 NRL season, Lafai made his NRL debut for the Canterbury-Bankstown Bulldogs against the South Sydney Rabbitohs filling in for the injured Josh Morris, scoring a try on debut in Canterbury's 28-19 win at ANZ Stadium. Lafai finished his debut year in the NRL with him playing in 8 matches and scoring 2 tries for the Bulldogs. On 8 September 2011, Lafai was named on the interchange bench in the 2011 Toyota Cup Team of the Year.

=== 2012 ===
Lafai returned to the Canterbury first grade side in round 5 filling in for the injured Steven Turner, scoring a try in the Bulldogs 46-12 victory over the Parramatta Eels at ANZ Stadium. In round 13 against the South Sydney Rabbitohs, Lafai suffered a dislocated right shoulder sidelining him for the rest of the year in the Bulldogs 23-18 win at ANZ Stadium. Lafai played in 5 matches and scored 2 tries for the Bulldogs in the 2012 NRL season.

=== 2013 ===
Lafai returned to the Canterbury-Bankstown first grade side in round 5 filling in the suspended Krisnan Inu in the centres in the Bulldogs 20-6 defeat by the Manly-Warringah Sea Eagles at ANZ Stadium. Lafai played in 16 matches, scored 7 tries and kicked 1 goal for the Bulldogs in the 2013 NRL season.

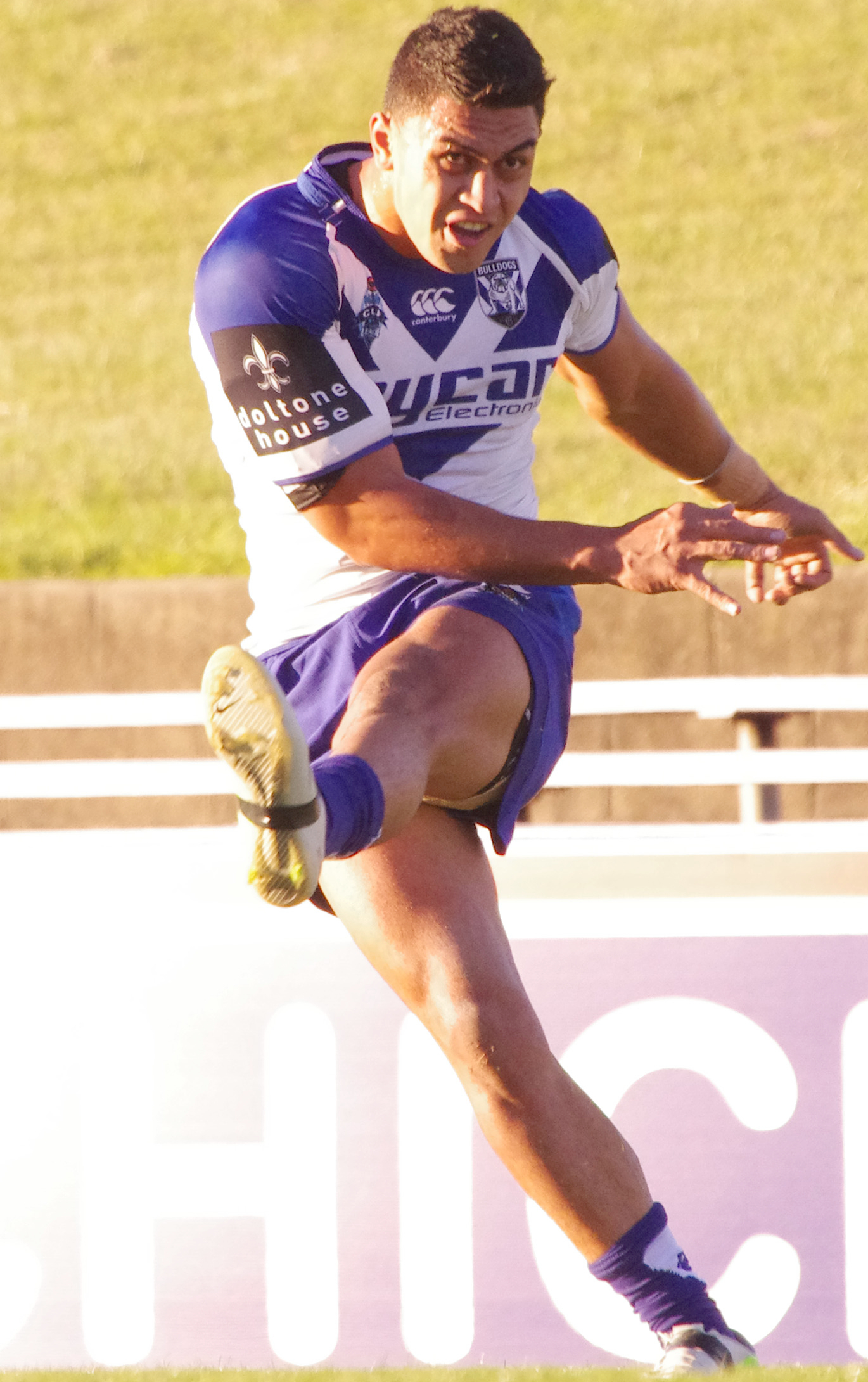
Lafai playing for the Canterbury Bulldogs in 2013

On 12 October 2013, Lafai was named in the Samoa 24-man squad for the 2013 World Cup, playing in 3 matches. Lafai making his Samoa international debut against Papua New Guinea at centre in Samoa's 38-4 win at Craven Park.

=== 2014 ===
On 5 October 2014, in Canterbury-Bankstown's 2014 NRL Grand Final against South Sydney, Lafai played at centre in the club's 30-6 loss. Lafai finished the Bulldogs 2014 NRL season as the club's highest tryscorer with 14 tries as well with him kicking 4 goals in 25 matches. On 7 October 2014, Lafai was selected in the Samoan 24-man squad for the 2014 Four Nations series.

=== 2015 ===
In August, it was rumoured that Lafai was going to sign with the Manly-Warringah Sea Eagles for the 2016 season to make way for Parramatta Eels player Will Hopoate at the Bulldogs, but that was later dismissed. Lafai finished off the 2015 season having played in 20 matches, scoring 5 tries and kicking 1 goal. On 11 December, he signed a two-year contract with the St. George Illawarra Dragons starting in 2016, after being released from the final two years of his Canterbury-Bankstown contract.

=== 2016 ===
In February, Lafai played for the Dragons in the 2016 NRL Auckland Nines.

In round 1 of the 2016 NRL season, Lafai made his club debut for the St George Illawarra Dragons against the Melbourne Storm, playing at centre in the Dragons 18-16 loss at AAMI Park.

On 24 July, Lafai and Siliva Havili were arrested after brawling in the street outside a nightclub with another man. The alleged victim claimed Havili punched him when he had his back turned. Lafai and Havili were charged with common assault and offensive behaviour, but later escaped conviction with a guilty plea.

In round 10 against the Canberra Raiders, Lafai scored his first club try for the St George Illawarra Dragons in the 16-12 golden point extra time win at Jubilee Oval.

On 8 October 2016, Lafai played for Samoa in their historical test match against Fiji in Apia.

=== 2017 ===
After a good start to the 2017 NRL season, Lafai was rewarded with a three-year contract extension by St George, keeping him at the club until the end of the 2020 NRL season.

=== 2018 ===
Lafai made 26 appearances for St George in the 2018 NRL season as the club finished 7th on the table and qualified for the finals. Lafai scored a try for St George as they shocked a highly fancied Brisbane side 48-18 at Suncorp Stadium. The following week, Lafai played in the club's 13-12 elimination final loss against South Sydney.

=== 2019 ===
Lafai began the 2019 NRL season as one of the club's first choice centres. In round 5, Lafai scored a try and kicked 4 goals as St George defeated Canterbury 40-4 at Kogarah Oval. In round 11 against Cronulla, Lafai was taken from the field with an ankle injury as St George lost 22-9.

Lafai made a total of 21 appearances for St. George as the club endured one of their toughest ever seasons finishing second last on the table.

=== 2020 ===
On 20 July, Lafai was released by St. George returning to his former club Canterbury-Bankstown.

On 22 September, Lafai was one of eight players who were told they would be released by Canterbury at the end of the 2020 NRL season.

=== 2021 ===
On 17 February, Lafai signed a part-time Canterbury Cup NSW contract with Parramatta for the 2021 NRL season.

On 2 December 2021, it was reported that he had signed for Salford in the Super League.

=== 2022 ===
After missing out on initial selection, he was called up as a replacement into the Samoa squad for the 2021 Rugby League World Cup. Lafai played for Samoa in their 2021 Rugby League World Cup final loss to Australia. In November he was named in the 2021 RLWC Team of the Tournament.

=== 2023 ===
In the 2023 Super League season, Lafai played 19 matches for Salford as the club finished 7th on the table and missed the playoffs.

=== 2025 ===
On 14 March 2025, it was announced that Lafai was set to return to Australia, another casualty of the recent turbulent financial times at Salford Red Devils. Tim Lafai has retired from the league his last appearance in a National Rugby League event was at the 2025 NRL Telstra Premiership Grand Final where he stood upon other Rugby League greats such as Chad Townsend

== Statistics ==
Year	Team	Games	Tries	Goals	Pts
2011	Canterbury-Bankstown Bulldogs	8	2		8
2012	Canterbury-Bankstown Bulldogs	5	2		8
2013	Canterbury-Bankstown Bulldogs	16	7	1	30
2014	Canterbury-Bankstown Bulldogs	25	14	4	64
2015	Canterbury-Bankstown Bulldogs	20	5	1	22
2016	St. George Illawarra Dragons	18	3		12
2017	St. George Illawarra Dragons	24	7	6	40
2018	St. George Illawarra Dragons	26	6	4	32
2019	St. George Illawarra Dragons	21	2	9	26
2020	St. George Illawarra Dragons	2			
2020	Canterbury-Bankstown Bulldogs	5	2	1	10
2022	Salford	25	6		24
2023	Salford	20	6		24
2024	Salford	22	10		40
2025	Salford	2			
	Totals	234	69	26	300

== Controversy ==
On 12 April 2020 it was reported that Lafai had been handed an AVO by police following a Good Friday incident in his own home. Lafai was alleged to have punched holes in a wall after an argument with his wife. He subsequently checked himself into hospital with mental health issues.

Lafai's club St. George issued a statement saying "St George Illawarra are aware of a police matter involving Dragons centre Tim Lafai, the club said in a statement. As this is a deeply personal and private matter, at this stage the Dragons will be making no further comment".
