= Electricity Substation No. 167 =

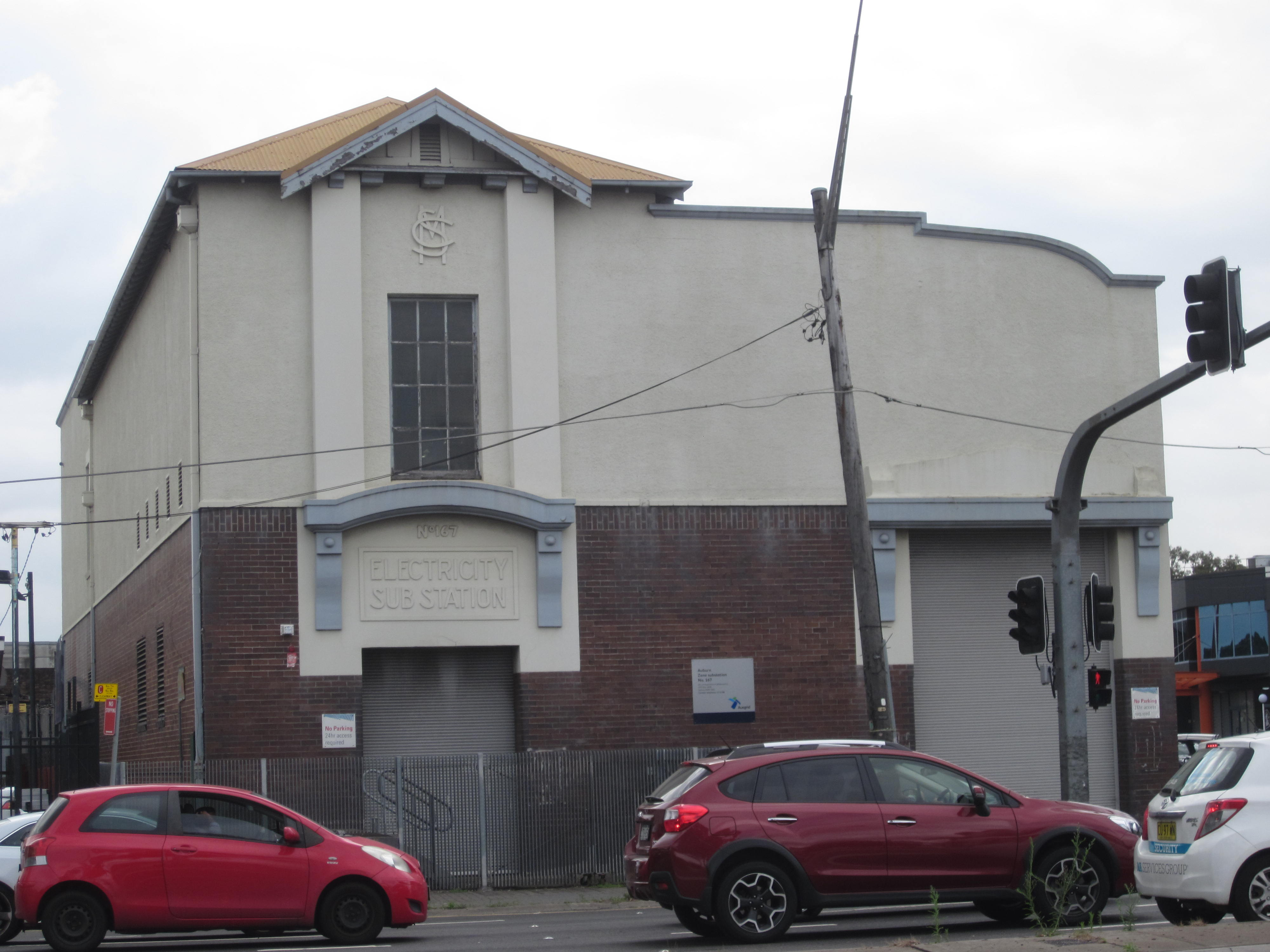
- Electricity Substation No. 167, 93 Parramatta Road, Auburn, New South Wales

- Location within Sydney
- 33°50′39″S 151°02′33″E
- Location: 93 Parramatta Road, Auburn, Cumberland Council, New South Wales, Australia

History
- Built: 1924–1929

Site notes
- Architect(s): City Architect; Municipal Council of Sydney (Mr Broderick; 1924. 1929 extensions; WF White)
- Owner: Ausgrid

New South Wales Heritage Register
- Official name: Electricity Substation No. 167; #167 'AUBURN' 33KV ZONE SUBSTATION; 'ELECTRICITY SUBSTATION'
- Type: State heritage (built)
- Designated: 2 May 2008
- Reference no.: 1790
- Type: Electricity Transformer/Substation
- Category: Utilities - Electricity
- Builders: Municipal Council of Sydney

Electricity Substation No. 167 is a heritage-listed electrical substation at 93 Parramatta Road, Auburn, New South Wales, Australia. It was designed and built from 1924 to 1929 by the Municipal Council of Sydney, with the City Architect being responsible for the design. It is also known as #167 'AUBURN' 33KV ZONE SUBSTATION. The property is owned by Ausgrid. It was added to the New South Wales State Heritage Register on 2 May 2008.

== History ==
The Auburn Zone substation No. 167 is a purpose designed and built structure dating from 1924, constructed by the Municipal Council of Sydney. The zone substation is located at the border between the area supplied by the Municipal Council of Sydney and that supplied by the private Parramatta and Granville Electric Company. Auburn Zone substation No. 167 was constructed as the main high voltage electricity distribution point for this part of Sydney and was the largest electrical facility built in western Sydney at that time.

The substation was substantially and sympathetically extended c. 1929 in response to increased demand for electricity driven by the rapid growth of the Auburn area. Its development marks the extension of the Municipal Council of Sydney's role as a regional electricity supplier to, what were in the 1920s, outlying areas of Sydney. Substation No 167 was integral to the development of the Auburn area as a major industrial area in the mid to late 20th century. The site was substantially upgraded in 2007 to extend its operational life for the foreseeable future.

=== Electricity Provision in Sydney, 1904 to present ===
In 1904, the first power station in Sydney commenced operations. The Municipal Council of Sydney had been given statutory authority in 1896 to produce and distribute electric light and power to central Sydney, including areas outside the council boundaries. From 1904 until 1935 the council's electric department, as both an electricity generation and distribution authority, constructed hundreds of small distribution substations throughout Sydney, many of which are still in service. The MCS supplied electricity to retail customers around the inner city, inner west and lower north shore and provided bulk power to outer western and northern suburbs such as Penrith, Hornsby and Manly.

The MCS initially competed against a number of private electricity supply companies. These were mostly small-scale operations which the MCS had acquired by 1914. The exception was the Electric Light and Power Supply Corporation (ELPSC), established in 1909, which was the one major private player in the Sydney electricity market until 1955 when it was nationalised by the Electricity Commission of NSW.

In 1935 the functions of the MCS Electricity Department were taken over by the Sydney County Council (SCC) with broad responsibility for electricity supply across the Sydney region. There was rapid expansion in the electricity distribution network with 40-50 substations constructed annually. The scale of SCC's operations consistently made it the largest local authority in Australia throughout the second half of the 20th century. In 1991 the SCC was reconstituted as Sydney Electricity (a statutory authority). In 1996 Sydney Electricity merged with the Hunter regional electricity authority Orion (formerly Shortland Electricity) and was corporatised as EnergyAustralia.

=== Substation design, 1904 to present ===
Electricity distribution substations were generally built as modest 1 or 2 storey buildings, with Zone Substations considerably larger in scale.

The style and nature of substation construction became progressively more standardised as the electricity network expanded. While the earliest substations tended to be large, well-ornamented public buildings, as they became more commonplace, substations became smaller and simpler. This reflected the need for cost-effective construction methods, the reduction in size of electrical equipment and the speed with which substations needed to be constructed to keep pace with demand. While early substations were often purpose-designed and built for a specific location, by the late 1920s the trend was for standardised designs built to a similar size and generally designed to fit on a standard suburban subdivision block, typically 100-200 m2.

Designs did keep pace with architectural trends and it is possible to identify a number of different and distinct architectural styles of substations. One-off designed substations did continue to be built well into the mid-20th century though these tended to be restricted to what the SCC referred to as "high class" suburbs in Sydney's east.

The number of substations constructed in the Sydney region exploded from the late 1920s, with dozens of substations being constructed in any one year to cope with expanding demand. While in the early years of network construction many substations had unique characteristics and were sited in response to a particular need, from the late 1920s standardised designs were generally used and expansion was based on a need to establish and expand the electricity grid rather than in response to localised or site-specific issues.

By the 1950s the trend towards architecturally designed and detailed substations was exhausted. From that point on, the freestanding metal kiosk-style substation was progressively introduced, while buildings, where they were constructed, tended towards strictly functional unadorned brick enclosures.

Substation design was also influenced by the general changes in Australian building construction in the mid-20th century. The trend towards larger steel and concrete buildings saw "chamber"" style substations incorporated directly within new buildings. In such circumstances the electricity provider had little or no input into the architectural style of the substation chamber, merely supplying technical requirements which influenced the location and size of the substation within the new building. This trend also saw smaller older-style substations demolished in some areas and replaced with new chamber substations incorporated into a new development. This style of construction is commonplace today, particularly in high density urban areas. EnergyAustralia's older substations range from very finely detailed to very plain and functional.

The early government-run electrical authorities were aware of the need to make substations in residential areas attractive and in keeping with the surroundings, and an architect joined the substation design area of Sydney County Council in 1936. By contrast, the modern trend is to make substations essentially invisible, through incorporating them into larger buildings, placing them wholly underground or within anonymous small steel boxes which tend to be ignored in urban environments. The exception to this continues to be the zone substations and high voltage switchyards, which continue to require large buildings or areas of land to house equipment.

Historically, better quality buildings tended to be reserved for what the MCS referred to as "high class" suburbs (particularly Woollahra and Mosman) while middle- and working-class suburbs generally received much simpler, functional buildings. Designs tended to be reused, sometimes with only minimal variation. There are also marked stylistic differences between substations constructed by government as opposed to those constructed by the Electric Light and Power Supply Corporation (ELPSC) throughout the first half of the 20th century. The ELPSC substations tend to be functionalist brick boxes with only the slightest degree of architectural detailing or ornamentation, whereas the substations constructed by municipalities, while often reusing the same underlying design with minor variation, tend to be more finely detailed and in many instances are designed to match the architecture of the surrounding area. This may reflect the different nature of the competing priorities of a private as opposed to a government enterprise. A number of former ELPSC structures exist within the EnergyAustralia network.

=== Modifications and dates ===
The substation has been substantially altered internally over its life, including the replacement of most internal equipment.

It was connected to Substation #72 at Five Dock on 11 October 1933. On 15 August 1934 it was decided that a new Merz Price Balanced Voltage System was to be installed once the Clyde Engineering Works substation was online.

The original roof, gutters and downpipes have been replaced. Gutters and downpipes are sympathetic in style. Two entrance doors have been replaced with steel roller doors. Later chain wire boundary fences have been added to the site.

Transformer yard and equipment has been upgraded and replaced multiple times.

The site had a major upgrade from 2007 designed to continue its operational life into the future. The internal crane was recorded and removed to allow for equipment upgrades and installation of a new crane. In 2008-09, 2 new transformer bays of precast concrete panels and columns lined with a brick facade were added, with new equipment installed.

== Description ==
The Auburn Zone substation is a large and impressive two storey structure . It is prominently located at a major corner intersection and acts as a local landmark. Built in 1924, it was designed by the City Architect of the Municipal Council of Sydney (Mr Broderick) in the Interwar Art Nouveau style. It was substantially and sympathetically extended in 1929 (by MCS City Architect WF White) to become the largest of its style of substation built by the Municipal Council of Sydney. The Auburn Zone substation is a brick and cement render structure. The lower storey is finished in tuck-pointed face brick, and the upper storey is finished with a smooth cement render. The MCS logo and "ELECTRICITY SUBSTATION" are embossed in large lettering on the facade. The facade is asymmetrical with an elaborate entrance and hipped roof to one side, and a parapet and simpler plant entrance to the other. The street facade features Art Nouveau and Art Deco detailing. The style of Federation Arts and Crafts is evidenced by elements of Art Nouveau including the lettering style, treatment of the facade, a curvilinear cornice above the main doorway surmounted by stylised rendered pilasters, dentils and a small gable. The two entrance doors are later modifications and are a steel-roller shutter type.

It has been reported to be in generally good condition, excepting that the timber windows required painting and minor graffiti existed.

There has been some internal and external modification but the building is fundamentally intact.

== Heritage listing ==
Auburn Zone Substation No. 167 is significant at state level as the main high voltage electricity distribution point for this part of Sydney when constructed in 1924 by the Municipal Council of Sydney.

It is representative of the Municipal Council's extension of its role as a regional electricity supplier to what were then outlying areas of Sydney. Auburn marks the western extent of the Council's network, with power further west being supplied from a private company based in Parramatta.

Auburn Zone Substation No. 167 was the most substantial piece of early electrical infrastructure constructed in western Sydney in the 1920s and is the only one which remains in service for its original purpose. It was integral to the development of the Auburn area as a major industrial area in the mid- to late-20th century.

Auburn Zone Substation No. 167 is significant at state level as a large and attractive industrial structure which features Art Nouveau and Art Deco detailing to the street facade. Stylistically, the substation is a grand example of this type of substation architecture, which is generally characterised by smaller buildings. It is the largest of this style of substation and externally retains its character as an early 20th century industrial building.

The building was substantially and sympathetically extended in the late 1920s by the Municipal Council of Sydney in response to the rapid growth of the Auburn area and increased demand for electricity.

Electricity Substation No. 167 was listed on the New South Wales State Heritage Register on 2 May 2008 having satisfied the following criteria.

The place is important in demonstrating the course, or pattern, of cultural or natural history in New South Wales.

Auburn Zone Substation No. 167 is significant at state level both for its association with a significant historical phase, in the expansion of electricity provision to outlying areas of Sydney in the 1920s, and as demonstration of the continuity of historical activity in the provision of electricity to this area. Electricity Zone Substations are the critical backbone of the electricity network and serve as the points where the high voltage power supplied from the generation system is received and transformed for distribution to the network of small distribution substations and thence to customers. Auburn Zone Substation No. 167 was the major high voltage distribution point for this area of Sydney during the 1920s and was a key piece of infrastructure in the expansion and development of industry in the Auburn area in the mid to late 20th century. This zone substation is the largest piece of electrical infrastructure that was built by the Municipal Council of Sydney in western Sydney. Auburn Zone Substation No. 167 has been continually upgraded over the intervening years and continues to serve its original function as an item of critical infrastructure within Sydney's electricity network (2007).

The place has a strong or special association with a person, or group of persons, of importance of cultural or natural history of New South Wales's history.

Auburn Zone Electricity Substation No. 167 is significant at state level for its association with the work of Walter Frederick White (ARIA) from c. 1924 to 1947 at the City Architect's Office, Municipal Council of Sydney and its successor organisation, Sydney County Council. While White did not design the original building, he was responsible for its 1929 extensions. Other electricity substations that White is also known to have designed are No. 269, Bondi (1928) and No. 349, Randwick (1930), both of which were prestige structures in the Mediterranean/Spanish Mission styles designed to complement the building stock of these suburbs. Further research should reveal additional surviving substations built by the Municipal Council of Sydney and Sydney County Council that can be attributed to WF White.

The place is important in demonstrating aesthetic characteristics and/or a high degree of creative or technical achievement in New South Wales.

Auburn Zone Substation No. 167 is significant at state level for its size and style. Electricity zone substations were considerably larger structures than ordinary substations. No. 167 is a large and attractive structure which features Art Nouveau and Art Deco detailing to the street facade. It is the largest of this style of substation constructed by the Municipal Council of Sydney, a style that was typically characterised by much smaller buildings. The high standard of electricity substation design of the 1920s and 1930s demonstrates the undertaking of the Municipal Council of Sydney (and later the Sydney County Council) to apply architectural design to utilitarian structures.

The place possesses uncommon, rare or endangered aspects of the cultural or natural history of New South Wales.

Auburn Zone Substation No. 167 is significant at state level as the largest and most intact of the zone substations constructed by the Municipal Council of Sydney in the Interwar Art Nouveau style. It shares stylistic similarities with two other similar period and style zone substations, but is the best example of the type. Zone Substation No. 80, Chatswood (1923) is a smaller example of the style which has had a greater degree of modification than the Auburn Zone Station. Zone Substation No. 129, Hunters Hill (1928, located in Gladesville), is another smaller example of the style which was originally of a similar design to Auburn Zone Substation No. 167. No. 129 has, however, been considerably altered, including the demolition of a two-storey portion of the building on the front facade which has been replaced with a brick wall. Both Zone Substations No. 80 and No. 129 have been assessed by EnergyAustralia for its s. 170 Heritage and Conservation Register as having local significance.

The place is important in demonstrating the principal characteristics of a class of cultural or natural places/environments in New South Wales.

Auburn Electricity Substation No. 167 is significant at state level as typical, in scale and function, of the high voltage substations built throughout Sydney in the 1920s and 1930s for the expansion of the electricity network. It is the largest and most intact example of its style.

== See also ==
- Ausgrid
