= Auburn Railway Signal Box =

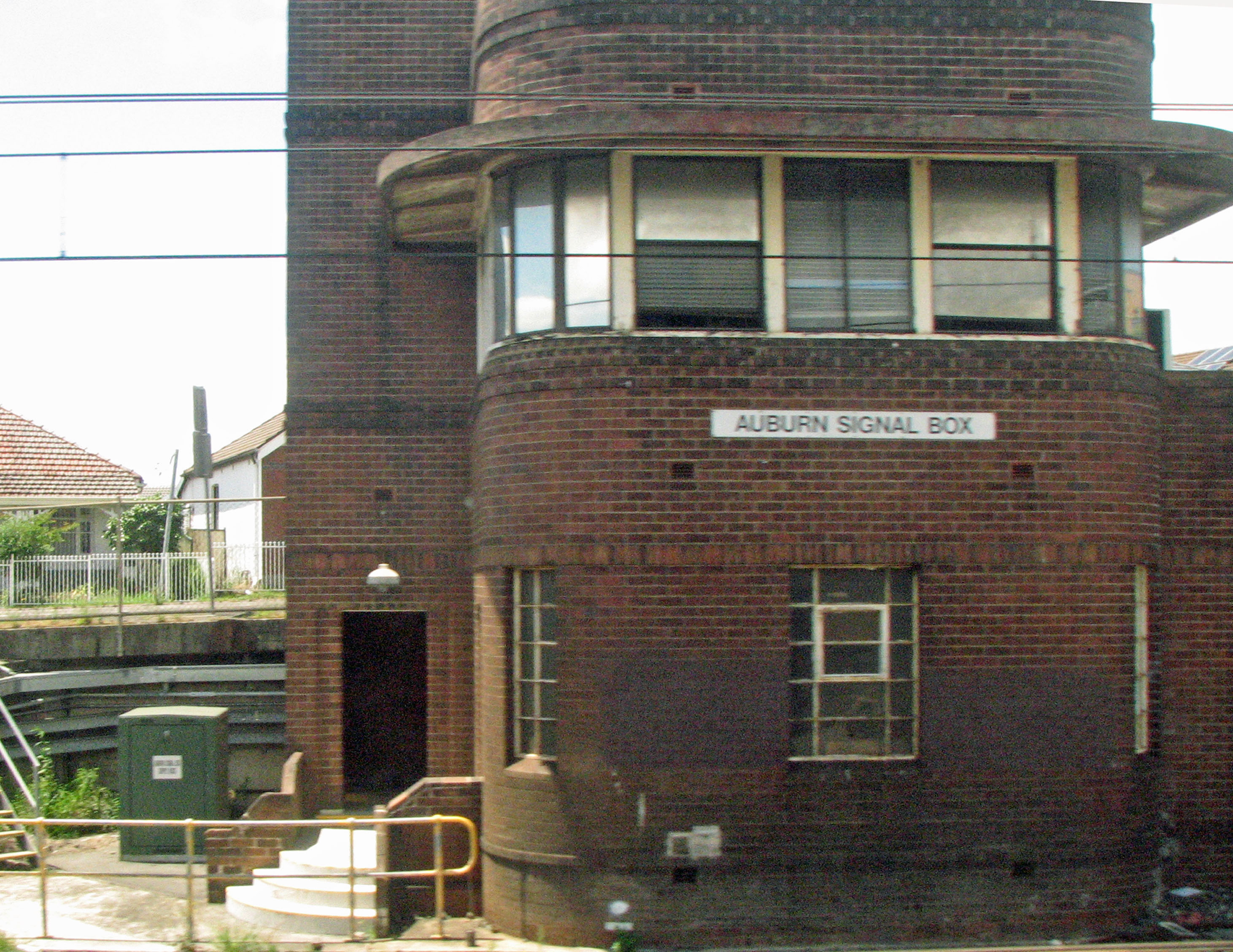
- Auburn Railway Signal Box, 2018

- Location within Sydney
- 33.8467°S 151.0302°E
- Location: Main Suburban railway line, Auburn, New South Wales, Australia

History
- Built: 1954

Site notes
- Architect: New South Wales Government Railways
- Owner: RailCorp

New South Wales Heritage Register
- Official name: Auburn Railway Signal Box; Railway Signal Box
- Type: state heritage (built)
- Designated: 2 April 1999
- Reference no.: 1023
- Type: Signal Box
- Category: Transport - Rail
- Builders: NSW Department of Railways

Auburn Railway Signal Box is a heritage-listed railway signal box on the Main Suburban railway line, Auburn, New South Wales, Australia. It was designed by New South Wales Government Railways (NSWGR) and built in 1954 by the NSW Department of Railways. It is also known as Railway Signal Box. The property is owned by RailCorp. It was added to the New South Wales State Heritage Register on 2 April 1999. The rear of the building faces Rawson Street, Auburn, opposite 171 Rawson Street.

== History ==
A single railway track was opened through Auburn in 1855, and the line was duplicated in 1856. The original Auburn railway station was opened at this location in 1876. Nothing is known of the original buildings but they were replaced with a standard, second class set featuring a substantial main brick station building, approved by George Cowdery, Engineer for Existing Lines, in 1886.

In 1909 the NSWGR approved the demolition of the two original side platforms (slightly staggered) and they were replaced between 1909 and 1913 with an island platform and a standard Federation style building. There were 2 subways provided under the platform, with a ticket booking office on the platform between them, and an on-platform parcels office is shown in a 1938 plan. Plans also show a goods lift was installed on the platform c. 1950.

With the 1954 quadruplication of the line, the station was almost completely rebuilt, at which time the former c. 1913 platform building was demolished and a new simple canopy structure built. A second island platform was also built which featured simple steel canopies with small control rooms. Access to the platforms was provided by subway.

Improvements to the station were undertaken during the late 1980s and the 1954 station has been almost completely rebuilt.

The present signal box was opened on 20 June 1954 to assist in the management of traffic between Auburn and Granville when the number of main line tracks was being increased from three to five. Specifically, the signal box controlled access to Clyde down and up yards. It was one part of a much larger scheme to increase the tracks to four main lines between Lidcombe and St Marys during World War II in order to provide maximum track capacity to the American ammunition and general store built at Ropes Creek. It took over 32 years until all aspects of the quadruplication were completed between Westmead and Blacktown. Quadruplication reached St Marys in 1978, while the Granville to Westmead section was finally completed in 1986.

When opened in 1954, the Auburn Signal Box was the first of four Functionalist style boxes between Auburn and Blacktown, these being Auburn, Clyde, Granville and Blacktown. The style was only used from Auburn to Granville as the railway system was largely in place by this time. These boxes represented the last time when conventional, elevated signal boxes were built utilising the traditional model of a ground floor relay room and an upper level where the interlocking frame was operated. A subsequent design of elevated boxes was used in the 1960s but these did not accord to the classic, two-level design with a rectangular footprint.

Air conditioning was installed in the signal box upper level in 1981. Some of the signal box window frames were removed and replaced with modern materials and the brick relay room annex was added to the signal box c. 1985.

== Description ==
Auburn signal box is an "S" type post war version of the elevated power boxes. Others of this type are Clyde, Granville and Blacktown. The signal box operates by relay interlocking machines and features 90 Kellogg Keys levers.

Constructed of polychromatic face brick, it is a two-storey electric power signal box with a single storey relay wing and designed in the Functionalist style. The massing reflects a dominant entrance/ amenities tower contrasting with curved walls of the signal box. Windows are shaded by a cantilevered concrete awning. Upper level ribbon windows are timber framed, as are doors, however the ground floor signal room windows have been replaced with aluminium fixed or double hung types. The flat roof is concealed behind the brick parapet.

Internally, a two-flight staircase leads to the operating (or upper level) signal room that contains the original toggle switch control panel, desk and illuminated wall diagram (paper based, dated 3/6/52). Staff toilet facilities are on the first floor. The ground floor relay room still operates with some original equipment such as the main control panel. A brick single storey relay room annex with flat metal tray roof has been added to the east end. Original doors, and wall and ceiling linings are also evident.

The only moveable items observed were the original desks and equipment.

The signal box was reported to be in good condition both externally and internally as at 10 October 2010. The building is almost completely intact.

== Heritage listing ==
Auburn railway signal box is significant as the first of a series of four elevated power signal boxes needed for track amplification works from Auburn to Blacktown during the 1950s, designed as a cohesive group in a post-World War II period functionalist style. The signal box is a good example of this last group of signal boxes to be built to a standard railway design in NSW and it remains in operation in 2009. It has a high degree of intactness and retains its original operational equipment including the CTC panel, desk and illuminated panel.

Auburn Railway Signal Box was listed on the New South Wales State Heritage Register on 2 April 1999 having satisfied the following criteria.

The place is important in demonstrating the course, or pattern, of cultural or natural history in New South Wales.

The Auburn signal box is of historical significance as the oldest building remaining in the Auburn railway precinct. It is further significant as the first of four signal boxes constructed in 1954 to assist traffic management between Auburn and Granville when the number of main lines was increased from three to five as part of the rebuilding of the Main Western line after 1948.

The place has a strong or special association with a person, or group of persons, of importance of cultural or natural history of New South Wales's history.

The signal relays are reported to be made by well known international signalling firm McKenzie & Holland who began supplying interlocking machines and signalling equipment to the NSW Railways in 1881 and continued until 1927.

The place is important in demonstrating aesthetic characteristics and/or a high degree of creative or technical achievement in New South Wales.

The signal box is aesthetically a good example of post World War II period functionalist style railway architecture demonstrating key elements of the style including brick banding, ribbon windows and curved cantilevered awnings.

The Signal Box has technical significance as it retains much of its original equipment including its original toggle switch control panel, desk and illuminated wall diagram and some original equipment in the downstairs relay room.

The place has a strong or special association with a particular community or cultural group in New South Wales for social, cultural or spiritual reasons.

The place has the potential to contribute to the local community's sense of place and can provide a connection to the local community's history.

The place is important in demonstrating the principal characteristics of a class of cultural or natural places/environments in New South Wales.

The signal box is representative of the four signal boxes built between Auburn and Blacktown after World War II in the functionalist style, the others being Granville, Clyde and Blacktown.
