= Lopini Paea =

Former Tonga international rugby league footballer

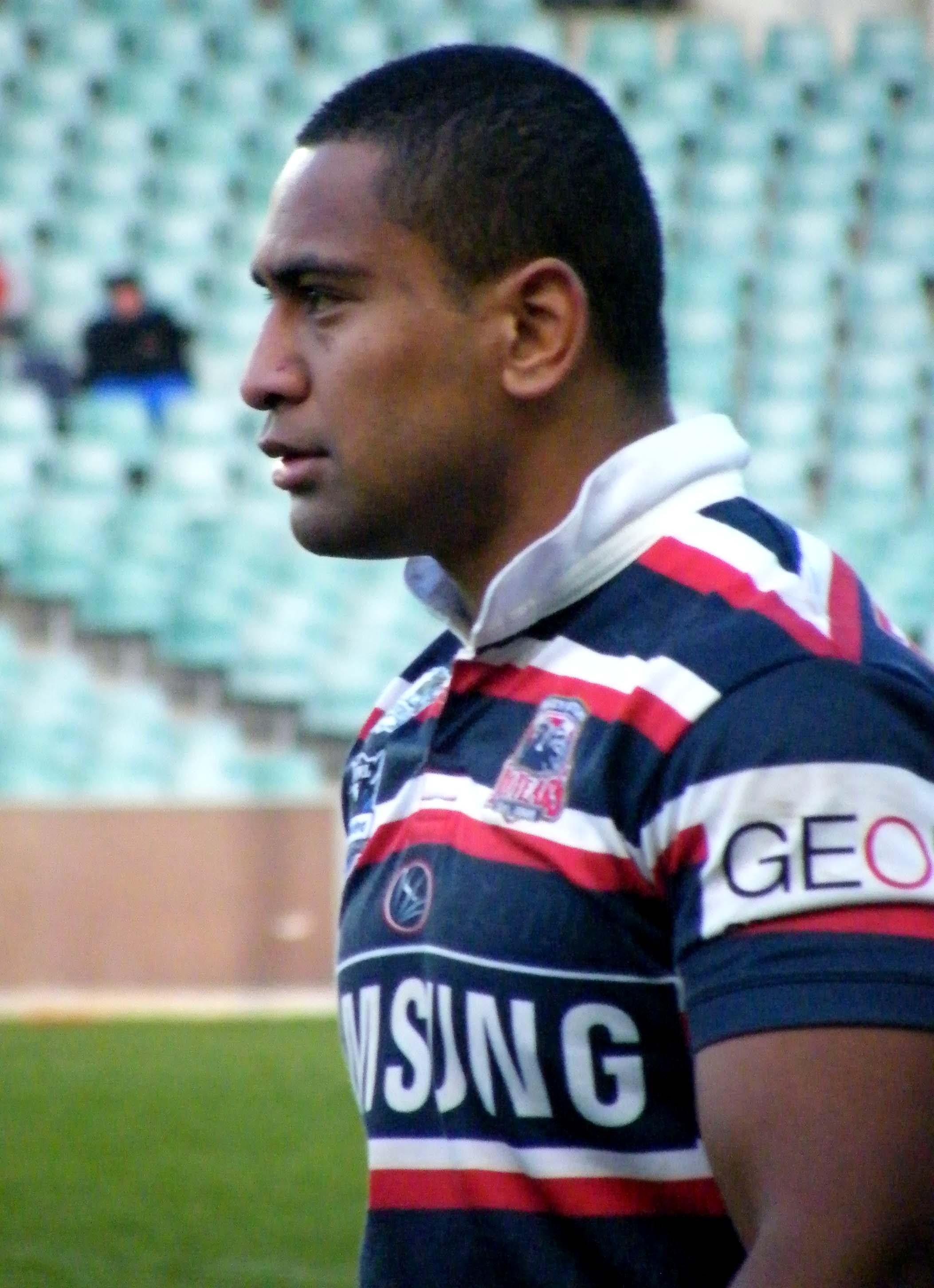

Personal information
- Born: 19 April 1984 (age 42) Auburn, New South Wales, Australia

Playing information
- Height: 184 cm (6 ft 0 in)
- Weight: 104 kg (16 st 5 lb)
- Position: Prop, Second-row
Club
Years	Team	Pld	T	G	FG	P
2003–10	Sydney Roosters	95	3	0	0	12
2011–14	Catalans Dragons	88	10	0	0	40
2015	Wakefield Trinity	11	0	0	0	0
	Total	194	13	0	0	52
Representative
Years	Team	Pld	T	G	FG	P
2005–08	Tonga	11	0	0	0	0
- Relatives: Mickey Paea (brother); Lelea Paea (brother); Eddie Paea (cousin)

Lopini Paea (born 19 April 1984) is a Tonga international rugby league footballer who last played for the Sydney Roosters in the National Rugby League. He previously played for the Wakefield Trinity Wildcats and the Catalans Dragons in the Super League. His preferred position is prop.

== Background ==
Paea was born in Auburn, New South Wales, Australia.

He is the brother of Mickey Paea and Lelea Paea. Paea attended Sarah Redfern High School, and played junior rugby league for the Minto Cobras.

== Playing career ==
Paea made his first grade debut for the Sydney Roosters in round 22 of the 2003 NRL season against Cronulla-Sutherland at the Sydney Football Stadium. He made three appearances for the club in his debut season but did not feature in the club's finals campaign or 2003 NRL Grand Final defeat against Penrith.

Paea missed the entire 2004 NRL season but returned in 2005 making five appearances for the club. Over the next few seasons, Paea became a regular starter within the Sydney Roosters team. During the 2006 NRL season, Paea was suspended for ten weeks after performing a dangerous tackle on Melbourne Storm player Ben Cross.

He played in the 2006 NSW Cup grand final for Newtown who were the Sydney Roosters feeder club at the time against Parramatta. Newtown would lose the grand final 20–19 at Stadium Australia.

In the 2009 NRL season, Paea played 21 games as the club finished last on the table for the first time since 1966.

He played in the 2010 NRL Grand Final earning a late recall in the team replacing James Aubusson. The Roosters lost however 32–8 to St. George Illawarra at ANZ Stadium.

Following the Grand Final, Paea joined France-based Super League side Catalans Dragons, where he played until 2014, when he joined Super League rivals Wakefield Trinity Wildcats.

In June 2015, Paea was granted a release from his contract to return to his first club the Sydney Roosters for the remainder of the season, however did not see any game time.

=== Representative ===
Paea has represented on several occasions for the Tongan national team with his most recent international games during the 2007 Junior Kangaroos tour, in which Paea also captained the Tongan side.

In August 2008, Lopini Paea was named in the Tonga training squad for the 2008 Rugby League World Cup, and in October 2008 he was named in the final 24-man Tonga squad.
