= Vincent Leuluai =

Australian rugby league footballer (born 1995)

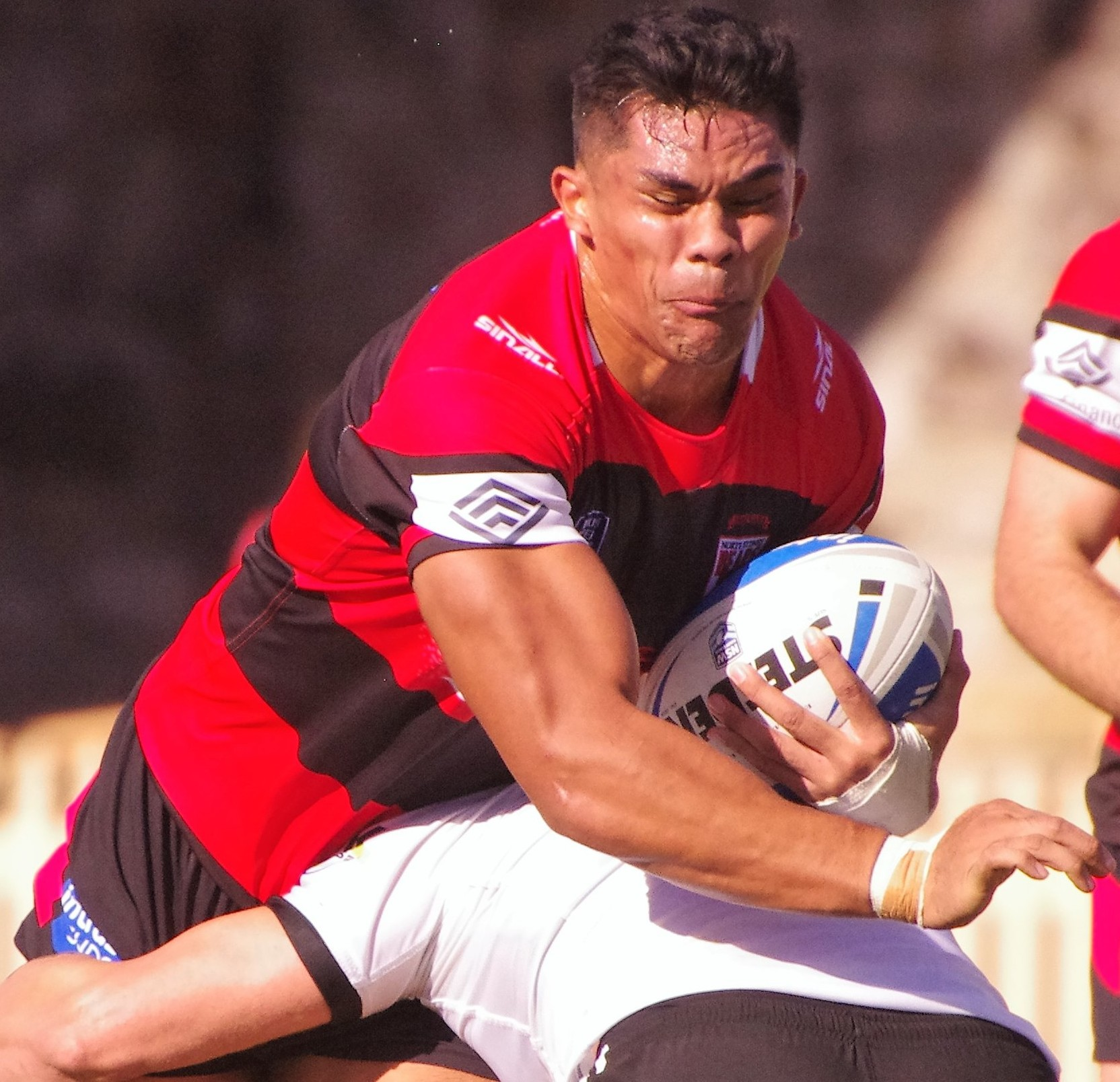

Personal information
- Born: 24 October 1995 (age 30) Sydney, New South Wales, Australia
- Height: 180 cm (5 ft 11 in)
- Weight: 103 kg (16 st 3 lb)

Playing information
- Position: Prop
Club
Years	Team	Pld	T	G	FG	P
2016	Sydney Roosters	3	0	0	0	0
2017	Melbourne Storm	2	0	0	0	0
	Total	5	0	0	0	0
- Source: As of 27 December 2018

Vincent Leuluai (born 24 October 1995) is an Australian professional rugby league footballer who plays for the North Sydney Bears. He plays at second-row and prop. He previously played for the Sydney Roosters.

== Background ==
Born in Sydney, New South Wales, Leuluai is of Samoan descent and played his junior rugby league for the Minto Cobras.

He was educated at Sarah Redfern High School, Western Sydney. After finishing school he was signed by the Sydney Roosters.

== Playing career ==
=== Early career ===
In 2012, Leuluai played for the Sydney Roosters S. G. Ball Cup team. From 2013 to 2015, he played for the Roosters' NYC team. In September and November 2013, he played for the Australian Schoolboys. On 1 October 2015, he was named as the NYC Players' Player award recipient.

=== 2016 ===
In February, Leuluai played for the Roosters in the 2016 NRL Auckland Nines. On 19 February, he made his first team debut for the Roosters in their 2016 World Club Series match against St. Helens, playing off the interchange bench in the Roosters' 38–12 win at Langtree Park. In Round 1 of the 2016 NRL season, he made his NRL debut for the Roosters against the South Sydney Rabbitohs. In July, he joined the Melbourne Storm mid-season on a contract until the end of 2018.

=== 2017 ===
Leuluai made his Melbourne Storm debut in round 2 of the 2017 season against the New Zealand Warriors. In November 2017 it was announced that he was returning to Sydney and had signed a new deal with the South Sydney Rabbitohs for 2018.

=== 2018 ===
On 12 December, Leuluai signed a one-year deal to join the North Sydney Bears from Souths.
