= Stanley Llewellyn Perry =

- Born: 23 August 1890; Sydney, Australia
- Died: 2 May 1979 (aged 88); Concord, New South Wales, Australia
- Education: Auburn Superior Public School
- Occupation: Businessman
- Spouse: Mary Elizabeth Evans (m. 1924)
- Children: 0
- Parents: John William Perry (father); Louisa Mitchell (mother)
- Military career
- Allegiance: Australia
- Branch: Australian Army
- Service years: 1913-18
- Rank: Lieutenant colonel
- Unit: Australian Imperial Force
- Conflicts: World War I; Gallipoli campaign; Western Front; Battle of the Somme; Battle of Bullecourt; Battle of Messines
- Awards: Distinguished Service Order

Stanley Llewellyn Perry was born on 23 August 1890 in Sydney. He is the eldest son of seven children born to English poulterer John William Perry and his wife Louisa, née Mitchell.

Perry became surgeon major of the 3rd Battalion when attended Auburn Superior Public School. In 1909 he joined the school of engineering at the University of Sydney and became a partner in an engineering company in 1914.

Perry became second lieutenant in the 39th Infantry Battalion in February 1913. He was then recruited to the Australian Imperial Force on 15 October 1914 as second lieutenant in the 13th Battalion and participated in the landing of Gallipoli. On 1 February 1915, he was promoted to lieutenant because of his strategic skill and his ability in handling the unit.

After landing at Gallipoli on 25 April, his battalion moved to Quinn's Post and Pope's Hill with the task of clearing Russell's Top. The 'Fighting Thirteenth' suffered drastic casualties that week during an attack by the Turks on Quinn's Post.

Perry's men held their position against all odds on 29 May when the Turks broke into Quinn's Post. However, on the night of 6 August, Perry was badly injured during an attack on the Turks at Koja Chemen Tepe. He subsequently evacuated to Egypt but rejoined his unit there in January 1916 .

On 2 March Perry was transferred to 45th Battalion where he was promoted to captain. The 45th Battalion was established in Egypt as part of the "doubling" AIF. Half of this recruits were Gallipoli veteran from the 13th Battalion and the other half were from Australia, many of whom were from New South Wales. The battalion crossed to France on 2 June and moved into the front line at Fleurbaix and then on the Somme. Perry was severely wounded on 14 August near Pozières but again rejoined his unit after recovery and became a-second-in-command and had a responsibility of rebuilding his unit following Passchendaele.

The battalion advanced forward early January 1917 and on 6 January they took over the front line near Gueudecourt. They suffered heavy casualties in April at Bullecourt and even more significantly in June at Messines. On 16 October, Perry was appointed commanding officer at 48th Battalion and temporary lieutenant-colonel after he attended the Senior Officers’ School at Aldershot, the battalion took up at Sailey-le Sec, Alloville and Corbie .

In March 1918, German forces continued to push forward and on 5 April, the Germans struck with 15 divisions at Dernancourt and claimed the strategically vital "Hill 104" which resulted in a great number of casualties. Perry was appointed commanding officer of the 48th Infantry Battalion on 1 June 1918. On 8 August, the Allied forces launched an offensive. Perry was injured but successfully directed his unit to the capture of the Blue Line west of Provart. Perry was awarded a Distinguished Service Order because of his gallant conduct during the advancement of his battalion.

After being discharged from the army, Perry and his brother Jack set-up a chemical engineering company called Pyco in Sydney. The company produced pyrethrin insecticides but force to close in mid-1960 with government restrictions on the importing of pyrethrum flowers.

Perry married Mary Elizabeth Evans in Auburn Baptist Church on 12 April 1924. The couple did not have children. During his retirement, Perry was the main contributor to the writing of "Liberty Plains – a history of Auburn" which was published in 1982. On 2 May 1979 he died in Repatriation Hospital at Concord and was cremated. A memorial to him was dedicated at Arncliffe's St Paul Anglican Church on 17 May 1981.

The following table is an excerpt about the army life of lieutenant Stanley Llewellyn Perry. Dates on this table are slightly different from other sources.

Date of birth	1890-08-23	
Date and unit at appointment (Officers)	1914-12-20	Appointed Second Lieutenant with the 13th Battalion.
Date of embarkation	1914-12-22	Embarked with 13th Battalion.
Date promoted	1915-02-01	Appointed lieutenant.
Other units	1916-03-03	45th Battalion.
Date promoted	1916-03-12	Appointed captain.
Other units	1916-06-02	Joined the British Expeditionary Force – Alexandria.
Other units	1916-07-06	Transferred to England on duty.
Other units	1916-07-08	Joined Senior Officers School, Aldershot.
Date promoted	1916-08-25	Appointed major.
Date of honour or award	1916-11-14	Military Cross.
Other units	1917-10-01	Rejoined 45th Battalion.
Other units	1917-10-08 – 1918-04-12	46th Battalion.
Date promoted	1917-10-16	Appointed temporary lieutenant colonel.
Date of honour or award	1917-12-28	Mention in Despatches.
Other units	1918-04-12 – 1918-06-01	45th Battalion.
Date of honour or award	1918-05-28	Distinguished Service Order.
Date promoted	1918-06-01	Appointed lieutenant colonel.
Other units	1918-06-01 – 1918-09-02	48th Battalion.
Other units	1918-09-02 – 1918-09-08	4th Army Gas school.
Other units	1918-09-08	48th Battalion.
Date of honour or award	1918-12-31	Mention in Despatches.
Date of honour or award	1919-07-11	Mention in Despatches.
Other	1919-08-11	AIF appointment terminated.

== Biography ==
- Australian War Memorial. (n.d.) 1918 – Dernancourt and Villers-Bretonneux: Halting the Germans. Retrieved from https://www.awm.gov.au/exhibitions/1918/battles/dernancourt/
- Australian War Memorial (n.d.). Honours and Awards: Stanley Llewellyn Perry. Retrieved from https://www.awm.gov.au/people/rolls/R1536728/
- Australian War Memorial (n.d.). Lieutenant Colonel Stanley Llewellyn Perry, DSO, MC. Retrieved from https://www.awm.gov.au/units/people_6000.asp
- Lee, J.E. (n.d.). 45th Australian Infantry Battalion. Retrieved from https://www.awm.gov.au/unit/U51485/
- Mallett, R. (n.d.) 45th Battalion. Retrieved from http://www.diggerhistory.info/pages-conflicts-periods/ww1/1aif/4div/12bde/45th_battalion_aif.htm
- McCarthy, G.J. (2010). Perry, Stanley Llewellyn (1890–1979). In Encyclopedia of Australian Science. Retrieved from https://webarchive.nla.gov.au/awa/20110628153300/http://pandora.nla.gov.au/pan/10700/20110629-0133/www.eoas.info/biogs/P002165b.html
- Sutton, R. (1988). Australian Dictionary of Biography. Vol. 11. Retrieved from https://adb.anu.edu.au/biography/perry-stanley-llewellyn-8025
