= Lelea Paea =

Tonga international rugby league footballer

Personal information
- Full name: Lelea Paea
- Born: 6 January 1983 (age 42) Sydney, New South Wales, Australia
- Height: 183 cm (6 ft 0 in)
- Weight: 96 kg (15 st 2 lb)

Playing information

Rugby league
- Position: Wing, Centre
Club
Years	Team	Pld	T	G	FG	P
2003–06	Sydney Roosters	15	5	0	0	4
2007	Gold Coast Titans	6	1	0	0	0
	Total	48	26	0	0	4
Representative
Years	Team	Pld	T	G	FG	P
2006	Tonga	6	3	0	0	12

Rugby union
- Position: Centre, Wing
Club
Years	Team	Pld	T	G	FG	P
	Coca-Cola West Red Sparks
- Source: 21 As of 5 May 2010
- Relatives: Mickey Paea (brother); Lopini Paea (brother); Eddie Paea (cousin)

Lelea Paea (born 6 January 1983 in Sydney, New South Wales) is a former Tonga international rugby league footballer. He previously played for Coca-Cola West Red Sparks rugby union in Japan. He usually plays centre, but has played in wing at times throughout his career.

== Background ==
Lelea Paea was born in Sydney, New South Wales, Australia. He is the elder brother of Mickey Paea and Lopini Paea.

== Career ==
Lelea Paea is a Tongan international.

In 2007, Paea was one of the inaugural members of the newly admitted Gold Coast Titans side, signing with the new club after three seasons with the Sydney Roosters.
