= Marc Fennell =

Australian TV presenter (born 1985)

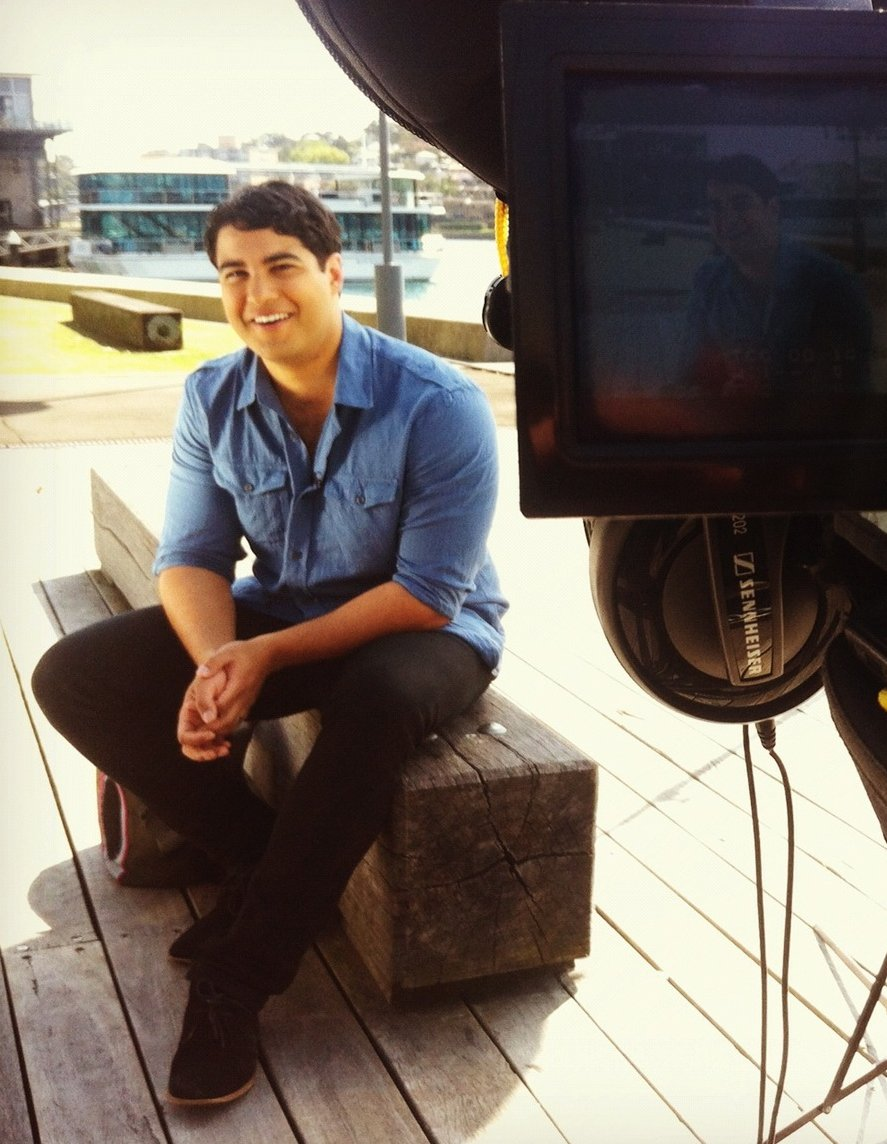
- Fennell in 2012
- Born: 1985 (age 40–41); Sydney, Australia
- Education: St George Christian School
- Occupations: Technology journalist; author; radio personality; TV presenter
- Years active: 2002–present
- Website: marcfennell.com

Marc Fennell (born 1985) is an Australian technology journalist, television presenter, radio personality, and author. He became known as co-anchor of The Feed on SBS Television, and as of October 2026 is the host of Mastermind (TV), No One Saw It Coming (podcast), and Stuff the British Stole (audio and TV). He was also the host of Download This Show (audio) until 2025. His most recent show is the three-part documentary for ABC Television, entitled The State of Man, which looks at how boys and young men are influenced by the Internet.

== Early life and education ==
Fennell was born in Sydney, to Shirley Vasanthee Nair and Paul Fennell. His mother, a school teacher, was a Chitty Indian-Singaporean who immigrated to Australia in 1980 while his father, a photographer, was of Anglo-Irish descent, with Fennell's paternal grandparents having left Ireland in 1960. His parents met while attending university.

He completed his Higher School Certificate in 2002 at St George Christian School.

He attended the University of Technology Sydney, but left after eight weeks to join SBS's youth show The Movie Show.

== Career ==
=== Film criticism ===
In 2002, Fennell was a winner of the first AFI Young Film Critics Competition. He then became the film critic and reporter for Sydney radio station FBi Radio from 2003–2006.

During this period Fennell was selected as one of four presenters of SBS's The Movie Show in mid-2004. Fennell remained with the show until June 2006, when the show went on hiatus, returning in a different format (and with a different team) in 2007.

Fennell covered cinema across the ABC Radio Network including ABC Local Radio and the national youth broadcaster Triple J. He presented the weekly movie segment on the Network Ten morning program The Circle from 2010 until it was axed in August 2012.

Fennell also regularly produced digital projects exploring cinema culture, including Bollywood For Beginners: a series for SBS Television about the history of Bollywood. He also co-produced a web series about movie trailers, Coming Sooner, with Nick Hayden and Nicholas McDougall.

=== Significant shows ===
Fennell presented and reported on Hungry Beast, a comedy and current affairs program that aired on ABC1 from 2009 to 2011. He primarily covered digital media, popular culture, gaming, and technology. Fennell was one of nine members of the team to be selected by Denton to develop online content for Zapruder's Other Films. Prior to Hungry Beast Fennell had worked with another of the presenters, Dan Ilic, developing a YouTube parody of the Freeview launch as part of their live comedy show Massage My Medium at the 2009 Melbourne International Comedy Festival.

Fennell hosted the ABC's technology radio program Download This Show from 2012 to 2025, which examined the latest developments in social media, consumer electronics, digital politics, hacktivism and online privacy. The program aired on Radio National, ABC Local Radio Digital and throughout Asia Pacific on Radio Australia. In 2012, iTunes Australia named Download This Show the best new podcast, and it won Best Audio Program at the Australian IT Journalism Awards ("The Lizzies") many times. It won Best Outlet in the 2023 Lizzies.

Marc Fennell anchored the SBS current affairs program The Feed from 2013 to its conclusion in 2022. In addition to his main role co-hosting, Fennell's prerecorded segments became a feature of the show, most notably his interviews with film and television stars. In 2020, Fennell won a Walkley Award for documenting the theft of museum specimens.

Fennell became an inaugural co-host of the weekly ABC television show India Now on 30 May 2022. The show, which presented "news, culture and politics from India and the subcontinent" is made by the creators of Planet America and China Tonight. The show was aimed at an Australian audience and it is hosted by Australians with Indian heritage. A second season began in April 2023.

Fennell created the ABC and CBC podcast series Stuff the British Stole which has since spawned a television series airing in Australia from November 2022 and Canada in January 2023. The third series of the show premiered in Australia on 9 June 2026.

From February 2021, Fennell began hosting the Australian version of Mastermind, replacing Jennifer Byrne. As of October 2026 he continues to present the programme.

=== Other work ===
Fennell has also regularly produced reports on technology for programs on ABC News 24 including News Exchange (ended), The Drum, Weekend Breakfast and the Technology Quarter (ended).

In 2019, Fennell created It Burns, a podcast series covering the global race to grow the hottest pepper. In 2020 he produced Nut Jobs, a podcast investigating $10 million worth of nuts stolen from California.

In September 2021, Fennell hosted the Australian version of The School That Tried to End Racism for ABC Television. In December 2021, Fennell presented Framed, a four-part SBS documentary investigating the theft of Picasso's painting The Weeping Woman.

In June 2023, he presented The Kingdom, a feature-length SBS documentary which investigated his former Pentecostal religion, in particular the successes and controversies of the Hillsong Church and the rise in new megachurches in Australia. Later that year, he presented his three-part investigation The Mission: The Strangest Art Heist You Never Heard Of about art works stolen in 1986 from the New Norcia Monastery in regional Western Australia.

In July 2025, Fennell started a new podcast highlighting interesting parts of history called No One Saw It Coming. In August 2025 he appeared as a contestant on Claire Hooper's House of Games. Fennell hosted Tell Me What You Really Think, a four-part series which premiered on SBS in October 2025. In the series, Fennell and guests discuss sensitive topics at a dinner party.

Fennell created, produced, and presented a three-part documentary series for ABC Television titled The State of Man, which was directed by Melissa Maclean, who also co-executive produced. Commissioned by the ABC, it aired on ABC TV and iview from 13 October 2026. Its focus is how boys and young men absorb the concept of masculinity, in particular via the Internet. It looks at the "manosphere", and one of its observations is how the COVID-19 pandemic led more boys to interact online while isolated from live interaction with their peers and others. The last episode looks at possible solutions to the more pernicious influences that boys may be exposed to online.

== Publications ==
Fennell's books include:

- That Movie Book (ebook, 2011)
- Planet According to Movies (2015)
- Stuff the British Stole (23 June 2026)

== Accolades ==
In 2020, Fennell was a joint winner of a Walkley Award in the category "Television/Video: Current Affairs Short (Less Than 20 Minutes)", for an episode of The Feed titled "Stuffed: Inside Australia's Biggest Museum Heist". Also awarded by the Walkley Foundation, he was a co-winner of the June Andrews Award for Arts Journalism, for The Mission in 2024. He has also been a finalist in several other Walkley Awards, in 2021, 2022, and 2023.

As of October 2026, he has been nominated for a Rose d'Or three times. He has also won eight New York Festivals medals; a James Beard Foundation Food Journalism Award (for It Burns); a Canadian Screen Award; an Asian Academy Creative National Award; ; two AWGIE Writers Guild Awards; three Australian International Documentary Conference Awards; an Association for International Broadcasters Award; and several Webby Awards.

== Personal life ==
Fennell married Madeleine Genner, and they have two children.
