= Roy Bossi =

Australian rugby league footballer

Personal information
- Full name: Roy Percival Bossi
- Born: 7 April 1894; Leichhardt, New South Wales, Australia
- Died: 22 May 1964 (aged 70); Hurstville, New South Wales, Australia

Playing information
- Position: Second-row, Hooker
Club
Years	Team	Pld	T	G	FG	P
1917	Western Suburbs	1	0	0	0	0
1921	St. George	5	0	0	0	0
	Total	6	0	0	0	0

Roy Percival Bossi (7 April 1894 – 22 May 1964) was an Australian rugby league footballer who played in the 1910s and 1920s.

== Background ==
Roy 'Bunny' Bossi was born in Leichhardt, New South Wales in 1894.

== Playing career ==
He joined Western Suburbs in the 1910s and played first grade with them in 1917. He later moved to the St. George District, and turned out for St. George during the foundation year of 1921.

'Bunny' Bossi played in the very first St. George match against Glebe, New South Wales on 23 April 1921 and he retired at the end of the 1921 season.

== Death ==
Bossi died on 22 May 1964 at his Hurstville, New South Wales home, aged 70.
