= Download This Show =

Australian technology discussion program

- Genre: Panel discussion
- Country of origin: Australia
- Home station: Radio National; ABC Local Radio
- Hosted by: Rae Johnston
- Original release: 2012
- Website: www.abc.net.au/listen/programs/downloadthisshow

Download This Show is an Australian weekly radio program and podcast produced by the Australian Broadcasting Corporation (ABC). It airs on ABC Radio National and is also available as a podcast via the ABC listen app.

The show focuses on current issues in technology, media, and digital culture. Each 30-minute episode features panel discussions and interviews with industry guests who discuss topics such as social media, streaming platforms, online privacy, and video games.

Download This Show premiered in 2012 and was originally hosted by journalist Marc Fennell. In 2025, hosting duties were taken over by technology journalist Rae Johnston.

== Recognition and awards ==
In 2012, iTunes Australia named Download This Show the best new podcast, and it has won Best Audio Program at the Australian IT Journalism Awards ("The Lizzies") many times. It won Best Outlet in the 2023 Lizzies.
