= Stuff the British Stole =

TV documentary series

- Genre: Historical documentary
- Written by: Marc Fennell (s1–3); Adam G. Thompson, Nathan Maynard (s2); Stephanie Weimar (s3)
- Directed by: Aaron Smith, Gary Hamaguchi, Shane Belcourt (s1); Stephanie Weimar (s2–3), Nathan Maynard (s2); Marc Fennell (s3)
- Presented by: Marc Fennell
- Country of origin: Australia
- Original language: Australian English
- No. of series: 3
- No. of episodes: 22

Production
- Producers: Marc Fennell (s1); Kate Pappas (s1–3); Patrick Cameron, Adam G. Thompson (s2); Alan Erson, Matt Maclellan (s3)
- Production companies: Wooden Horse, WildBear Entertainment, Cream Productions

Original release
- Network: ABC Television

Stuff the British Stole is a television documentary series based on an original podcast by Australian journalist Marc Fennell that premiered in November 2020. The TV series premiered in Australia in November 2022 in Canada in January 2023, and has continued with a third series airing in June 2026. A co-production of the Australian Broadcasting Corporation (ABC) and the Canadian Broadcasting Corporation (CBC), the series is hosted by Fennell. The series has been nominated for and won numerous awards.

== Podcast ==
The TV series arose from a podcast of the same name hosted by Marc Fennell, that premiered in November 2020 on ABC Radio and ABC Listen, in the wake of the Black Lives Matter movement. It was a co-production between ABC and CBC Podcasts.

The podcast rose to number 1 on the Apple Podcasts chart, and was named one of the year's best podcasts by Broadsheet and Junkee in Australia and US website Gizmodo. It also topped the charts in history podcasts in several countries around the world, and was downloaded over 6 million times. The last episode broadcast in Australia on 2 August 2023.

== TV series: synopsis, production, and release ==
The TV series arose from the podcast, and follows a similar theme. It delves into various controversies around historically and culturally significant objects and events involving the colonies of the British Empire.

=== Series 1 ===
The first series examines objects taken by the government and various institutions and /or individuals in the United Kingdom during its colonial era, and have been the subject of demands for their repatriation back to their homelands.

Series 1 is written and co-produced by Marc Fennell along with Kate Pappas. Aaron Smith, Gary Hamaguchi, Shane Belcourt direct the series, which comprises 6 x 30-minute episodes. It premiered on 1 November 2022 on ABC Television, and on 6 January 2023 on CBC.

=== Series 2 ===
A second series was greenlit in August 2023. It was co-written by Adam G. Thompson, Marc Fennell, and Nathan Maynard; produced by Kate Pappas, Patrick Cameron, and Adam G. Thompson; and directed by Stephanie Weimar and Nathan Maynard. Production companies Wooden Horse, WildBear Entertainment, and Cream Productions were the producing studios responsible.

Series 2, which comprises 8 x 30-minute episodes, aired from 17 June 2024 in Australia.

=== Series 3 ===
Series 3 was co-written and co-directed by Marc Fennell and Stephanie Weimar, and produced by Alan Erson, Kate Pappas, and Matt Maclellan. The series was produced by Wooden Horse, WildBear Entertainment, and Artemis Media for the ABC, with major production investment from the ABC and Screen Australia. Fennell was an executive producer as well as director, creator and presenter of the series.

Filming for a third series began in 2025, and took place over two years across eight countries as well as all around Australia. It aired on 9 June 2026, with all 8 x 30-minute episodes aired on ABC iview on the same date.

=== International broadcast ===
Stuff the British Stole s1 is available on Channel Four in the UK and on the paid streaming services BBC Select and Apple TV.

== Episode list ==
Objects profiled include the Koh-i-Noor diamond, the Parthenon Marbles, the Benin Bronzes, the Gweagal shield, Tipu's Tiger, and the Mokomokai.

Episode titles are as follows:

=== Series 1 ===
1. "Jewel of Denial" (Koh-i-Noor)
2. "Stoned" (Stone of Scone)
3. "Chipped Away" (Shellal Mosaic)
4. "Shadow Boxer" (Guardian Figure of Wei Tuo)
5. "The Crow Flies" (apparel of Crowfoot, a Chief of Blackfoot nation)
6. "The Return" (the remains of Yagan, a Noongar warrior from Western Australia)

=== Series 2 ===
1. "Parthenon Sculptures" (Parthenon Marbles)
2. "Australia's Egyptian Mystery" ((Nicholson Collection))
3. "World's Biggest Diamond" (Cullinan Diamond)
4. "Girl and Her Doll" (Mithina's Doll)
5. "Irish Giant" (Charles Byrne)
6. "Operation Legacy"
7. "Great Rubber Heist" (Henry Wickham)
8. "Mystery Sphinx" (Haida Sphinx)

=== Series 3 ===
1. "Tea Leaves China" (Robert Fortune and the Opium Wars)
2. "The Cook & the Dead" (Captain Cook's death)
3. "The Rosetta Code" (the Rosetta Stone)
4. "Flag Fall" (English flag)
5. "Five Star Rock" (Cranbourne meteorite)
6. "The Zong" (about the killing of enslaved people aboard the Zong in 1781)

== Recognition and awards ==
=== Wins ===
The series received a Canadian Screen Award nomination for Best History Documentary Program or Series at the 12th Canadian Screen Awards in 2024.

Other award wins include:

- 2021: New York Festivals Radio Awards (Gold Medal)
- 2021: Australian Podcast Awards
- 2022: Association of International Broadcasting Award (AIBs)
- 2022: New York Festivals Radio Awards (Gold Medal)
- 2024: Canadian Screen Award
- 2025: Screen Producers Australia Award · Best Documentary (s2)
- 2025: AIDC Award for Best Factual Series (s2)
- 2026: Canadian Screen Award · Best Director

=== Nominations ===
The series has also been nominated for the following awards:

- 2021: Walkley Arts Journalism Awards
- 2021: Association of International Broadcasting Award
- 2021: Association of International Broadcasting Award
- 2022: AIDC Awards
- 2022: Kennedy Journalism Awards
- 2022: Signal Awards (Note: New York-based podcast awards)
- 2022: The Buzzies Congress Awards for Excellence (Note: "The Buzzies", awarded by the World Congress of Science & Factual Producers (WCSFP), to "celebrate excellence in science and factual storytelling, and recognize short-form, long-form and multiplatform science, history and natural history projects, as well as awarding projects for innovation and impact".)
- 2023: Walkley Mid-Year Arts Award
- 2023: Rockie Awards (Banff, Canada)
- 2025: Association of International Broadcasting Award
- 2024: The Buzzies Congress Awards for Excellence for Best History Program, Long Format - WildBear Entertainment, Wooden Horse and Cream Productions
- 2024: Rose d'Or, Factual Entertainment (Wooden Horse, Wildbear, Cream Productions, Fremantle, ABC, CBC)
- 2024: AACTA Award for Best Factual Entertainment Program (Note: AACTAs are awarded in 2025 for 2024 shows.)
- 2024: AACTA Award for Best Direction in Nonfiction Television

== Scripted series adaptation ==
An upcoming "big-budget scripted heist series" based on the original documentary series was announced in June 2024, supported by Warner Bros. International Television Production Australia and Wooden Horse Productions. The new series will comprise six episodes of an hour duration each, described as "deep dive into the complexity of history, and identity, in our modern world through an irreverent and wryly humorous lens". Playwright turned screenwriter Anchuli Felicia King is the creator and lead writer; other writers include Ben Chessell, Kacie Anning, and Dylan van den Berg.

== Book ==
A book based upon the podcast and TV show, Stuff the British Stole, was published in 2026. Fennell describes it "an attempt to unredact the record" of the past "that's easiest to live with", which museums often present. In it, he examines Tipu's Tiger, Looty (a Pekingese dog stolen from the Old Summer Palace and given to Queen Victoria), the Elgin Marbles, the Horus mummy, the Shellal Mosaic, the Mount Keefe Chalice from Newmarket, County Cork now in the Victoria and Albert Museum, the Gweagal shield, the "Great Rubber Heist" (how rubber plants were smuggled from Brazil to Kew Gardens and then sent to the British-controlled Singapore Botanic Gardens, Operation Legacy in Kenya, the dodo on display at the Oxford University Museum of Natural History, and the Chagos Islanders.
