= Rae Johnston =

Australian journalist

Rae Johnston is an Australian STEM journalist and media presenter. A Wiradyuri woman with a Greek father, she was born and raised on Darug and Gundungurra Country in the Blue Mountains of New South Wales. Her work spans technology, science, gaming and popular culture across television, radio, podcasts and digital media.

== Career ==
Johnston began her media career in 2011 as a host of gaming TV show Save Point. In 2012, she joined Techlife as Lifestyle Editor covering gaming, consumer technolgy and internet culture. At this time, she also began presenting regular technology segments on Nine Network's MORNINGS (now Today Extra), and made her first appearances on ABC Radio National's Download This Show.

Johnston joined Gizmodo Australia as a journalist in 2015, tasked with covering science, technology and gaming. She became Editor in 2017 as the publication's first female editor. Her work then included regular appearances on NITV's The Point, SBS's The Feed and Small Business Secrets, as well as other Australian television and radio programs.

In 2018, Johnston became editor of Junkee. In December 2019, she joined NITV as its first science and technology editor, reporting across multiple platforms and focusing on science and technology through an Indigenous perspective.

Johnston has produced and presented several podcasts and television programs concerning science, technology and culture. Her podcast work has included Queens of the Drone Age, Download This Show and Weird Tech. She has presented programs for the Australian Broadcasting Corporation, as well as SBS and NITV, including Going Places with Ernie Dingo and The Secret DNA of Us.

== Awards ==
Beyond journalism, Johnston has served as an ambassador for UNICEF Australia and as a mentor for programs supporting diversity and representation in STEM. She has also served on the boards of the Telstra Foundation and Swinburne University of Technology. Her journalism and public commentary has frequently addressed the representation of Indigenous people and women in science, technology and gaming.
