= Hurstville =

- Suburb
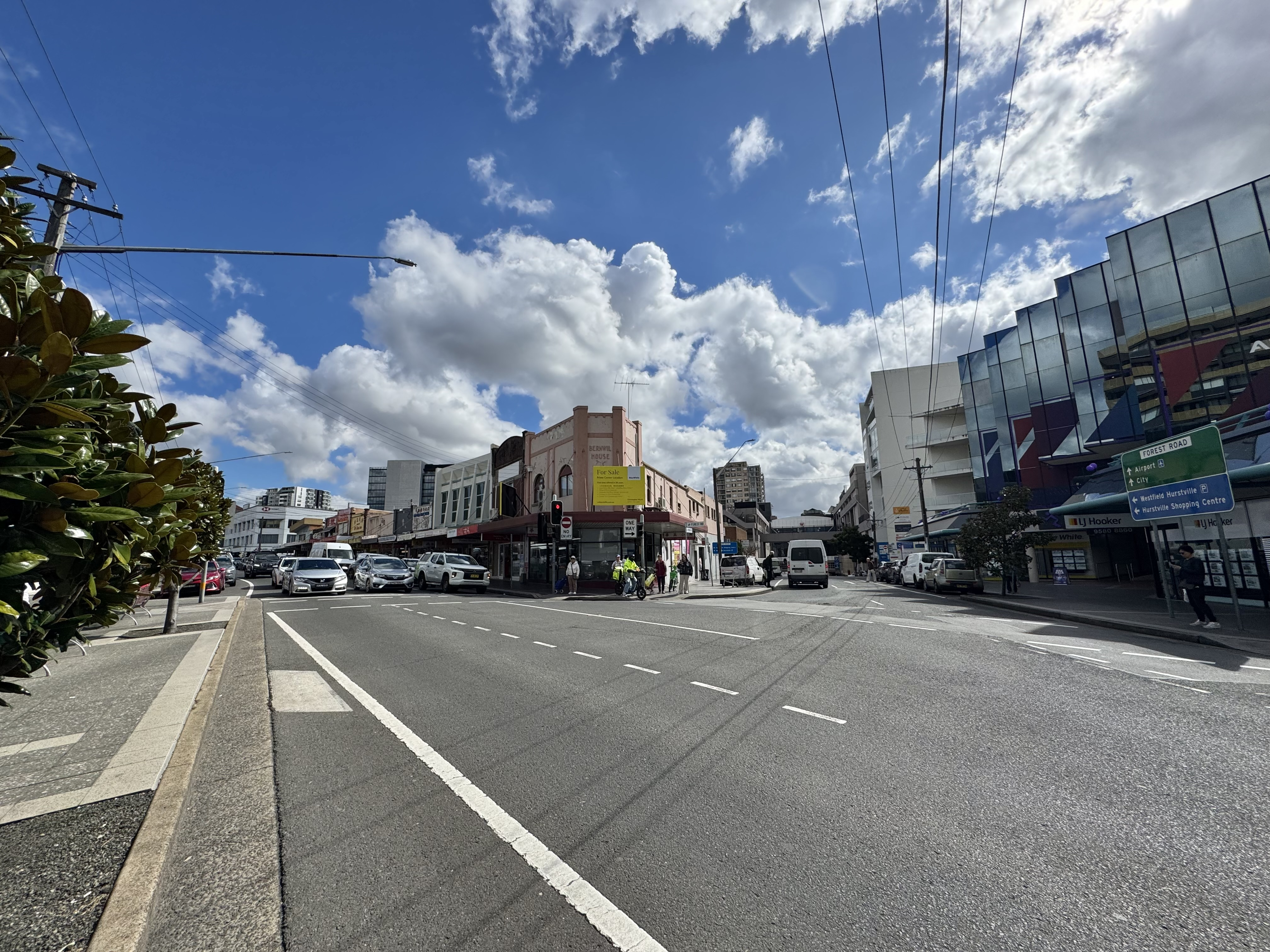
- Intersection of Forest Road and Park Road

- Interactive map of Hurstville
- Country: Australia
- State: New South Wales
- City: Sydney
- LGA: Georges River Council
- Location: 16 km (9.9 mi) south of Sydney CBD
- Established: 1887

Government
  - State electorates: Kogarah; Oatley
  - Federal divisions: Banks; Barton

Area
  - Total: 4.2 km^{2} (1.6 sq mi)
- Elevation: 75 m (246 ft)

Population
  - Total: 31,162 (2021 census)
  - Density: 7,420/km^{2} (19,220/sq mi)
- Postcode: 2220
Suburbs around Hurstville
Beverly Hills	Kingsgrove	Bexley
Penshurst	Hurstville	Carlton
Hurstville Grove	South Hurstville	Allawah

Location map of Hurstville based on NASA satellite images

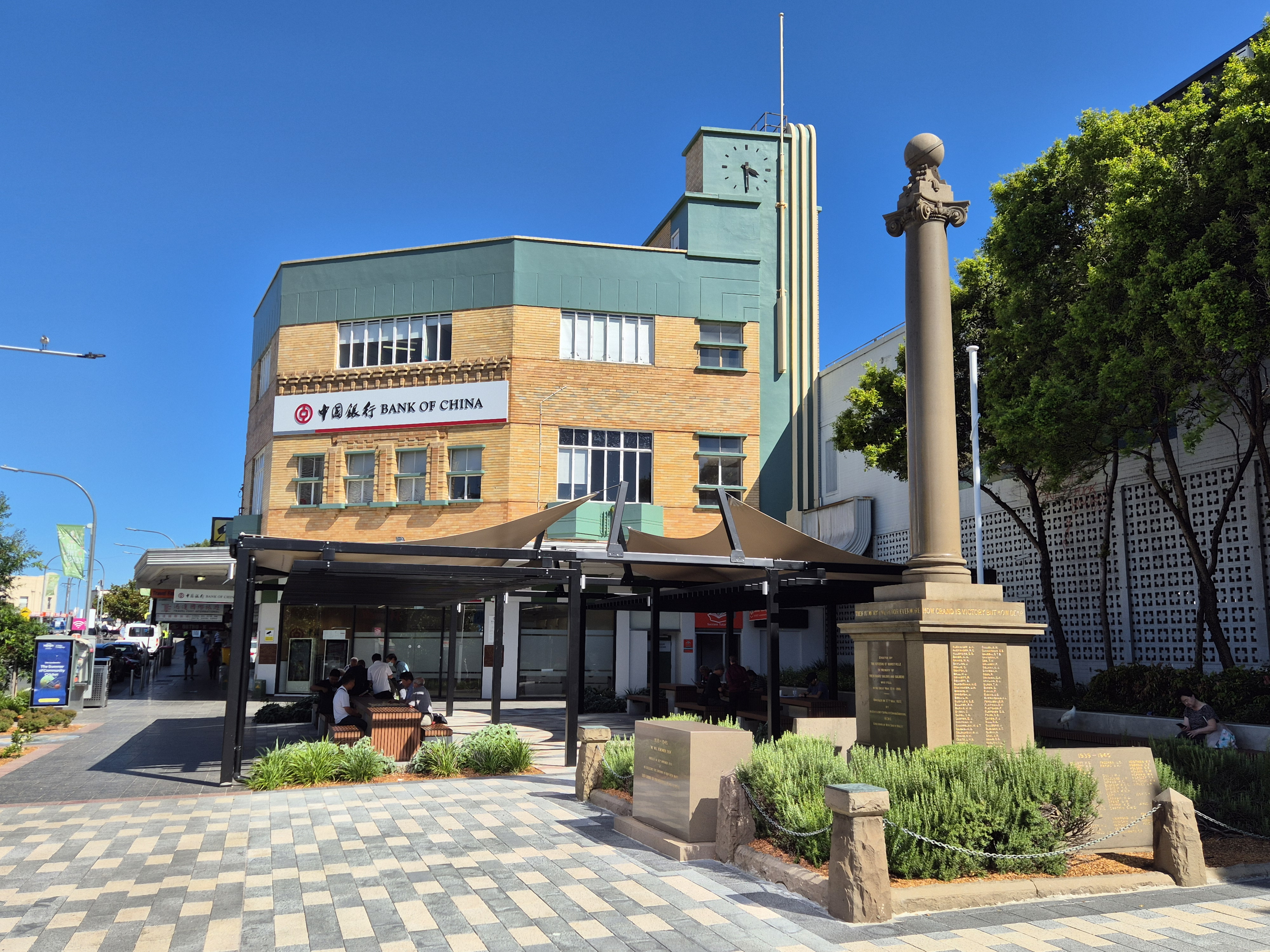
Memorial Square, Forest Road, Hurstville

Hurstville is a suburb in Southern Sydney, New South Wales, Australia. It is 16 km (9.9 mi) south of the Sydney CBD and is part of the St George area. Hurstville is the administrative centre of the local government area of the Georges River Council.

The suburb is predominantly Asian Australian in character, with 63% of the population of Asian origin, among the highest in the country. Sometimes described as "Sydney's Real Chinatown", an estimated 37% of residents are immigrants from mainland China.

== History ==
The name Hurstville is derived from the English 'hurst', meaning 'a wooded eminence', and 'ville', meaning 'town'.

=== Aboriginal culture ===
Although it is unknown when they first settled in the Hurstville area, the first inhabitants were Indigenous Australians. At the time of the arrival of the First Fleet, the Indigenous Australians residing in the area were of the Eora tribe, whose numbers spanned along the Georges River, from Botany Bay to present-day Liverpool.

=== European settlement ===
The first sustained contact between members of the First Fleet

and the Eora tribe occurred on 20 January 1788 within the boundaries of the present City of Hurstville at Lugarno and Oatley, at Lime Kiln Bay on the Georges River

— Diary of Lieutenant Philip Gidley King

While Governor Philip explored the south side of the Georges River around Como, King with a party of one other officer and three marines in a six-oared rowboat aimed for the highest point they could see on the north side, probably at Lugarno, and landed at a place they named Lance Point. Although first contact with the Indigenous Australians led to a small altercation where a spear was thrown and a shot fired, later in the day when the party rowed up Lime Kiln Bay towards present day Mortdale they were greeted in a friendly manner by both men and women, and what could only be described as Australia's first picnic took place as food and drink were shared between the two peoples. After a long summer afternoon of mutual contact and conviviality the British sailors rowed back to their ship moored at Botany Bay.

The land of the Hurstville region was granted by the government of the new colony of New South Wales to two men: Captain John Townson and his brother Robert Townson in 1808. Captain John Townson was granted 1,950 acres (7.9 km^{2}) of land which is now occupied by the suburb of Hurstville and part of Bexley. Robert Townson was granted the land which is now occupied by Penshurst, Mortdale and parts of Peakhurst. In the same year, in the area now known as Riverwood land grants were made to Jane Trotter, Mary Shepley, Charles Doudall, and James Ryan. Later in 1816 another land grant in the same area was given to Mary Redman.

In 1809, Captain John Townson was granted an additional 250 acres (1.0 km^{2}) in the area now occupied by Kingsgrove and Beverly Hills. The Townson brothers were not happy with the land that they were given because it was not suitable for the farming of sheep for wool and it is likely that the brothers never occupied their land. In 1812, a wealthy merchant named Simeon Lord bought the land of Captain John Townson and named it Lord's Forest. When Lord died, the land became the property of John Rose Holden and James Holt of the Bank of NSW.

=== Sproule family ===
Gladwyn is an historic, Italianate house at 96 Queens Road. It was built in 1893 by John Sproule, a local builder and alderman of Hurstville Council, who had acquired the land two years previously. It changed hands many times and was known as Gladwyn by 1906. Hurstville Council eventually acquired the house in 1986. It has been restored and adapted for commercial use, as well as serving as the base for the Hurstville Archival Research and Local Studies Centre. It is heritage-listed at state and local level.

In 1895, Ann Sproule bought land on the opposite side of Queens Road from the Winn brothers of Newcastle, New South Wales. John Sproule then built Yarra-Mundi in 1897, and lived there until 1904. The house then changed hands a number of times over the years. In 1981 it was acquired by the Danebank Church of England School for Girls. The school later sold the house in 2003 and it was subsequently adapted for commercial use. It is heritage-listed.

=== Development ===
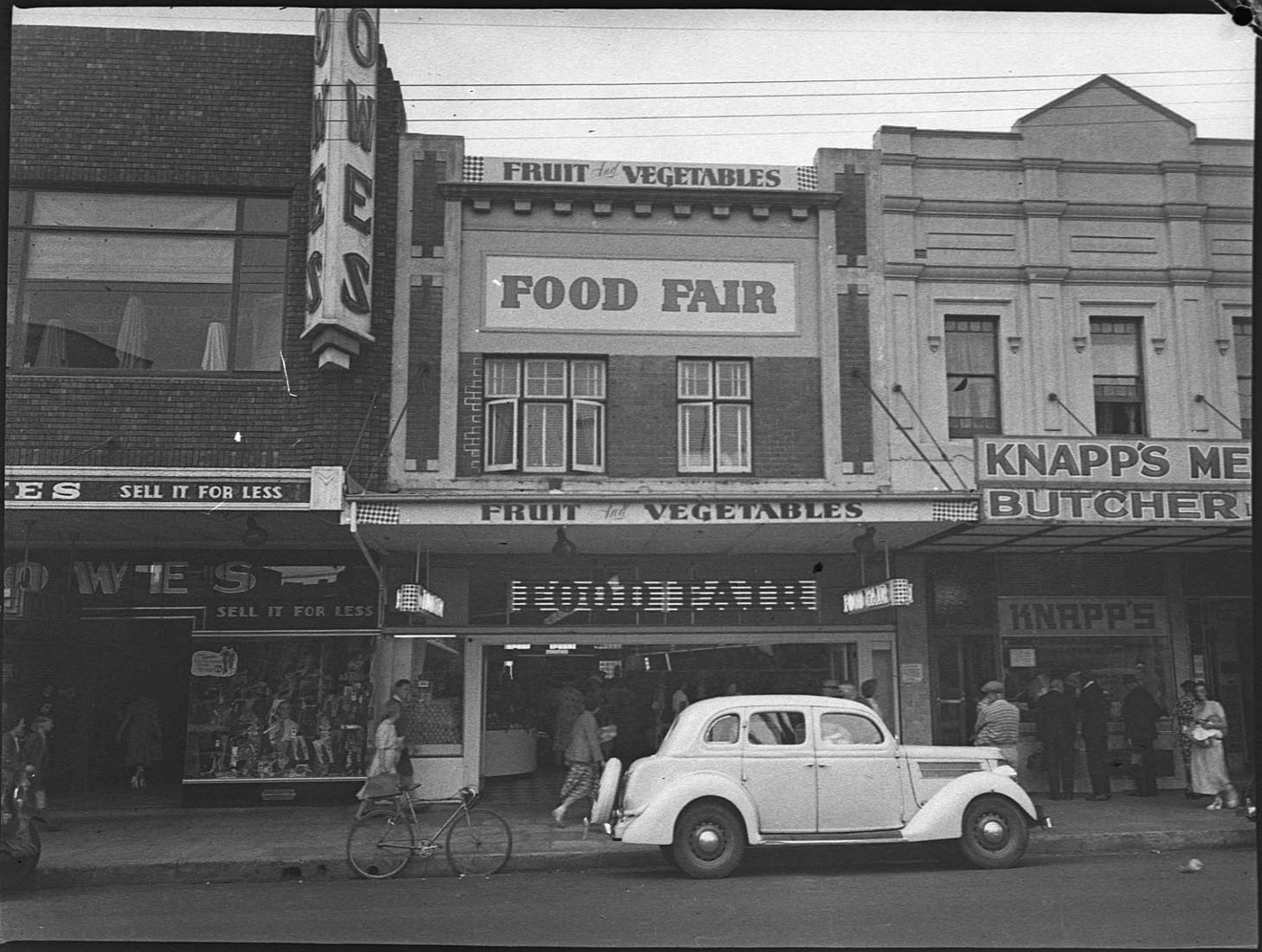
Forest Road on the 9 November 1951. Photograph taken by Sam Hood for LJ Hooker, State Library of New South Wales, 31762

A dam with a roadway on top was constructed on the Cooks River at Tempe in 1839. In 1843, the road that was to become known as Forest Road was extended from the dam to a hand-winched punt in Lugarno. On the other side of the river, the road continued all the way to Wollongong; however, it was only suitable for travellers on horseback. The new road opened up the Hurstville region and created a settlement at Bottle Forest, now known as Heathcote.

In 1850, the Lord Forest estate was purchased by Michael Gannon (1800–61), who subdivided it into small farms along what is now Croydon Road and three larger farms that were purchased by Dent, Peake, and Ibbotson. The area became known as Gannon's Forest. The land originally granted to Robert Townson was purchased by John Connell in 1830 and, following his death in 1849, the estate was inherited by his grandsons, Elias Pearson Laycock and John Connell Laycock.

The Gannon's Forest post office opened in 1881. The local school was named "Hurstville" by School Inspector MacIntyre when it was established in 1876. When the railway station opened on 15 October 1884, it took the name Hurstville, from the school. Hurstville municipality was incorporated in 1887 and, in 1988, Hurstville was declared a city. The Centenary Bakery on Forest Road is a historic building that has been preserved and once housed a museum. The St George Regional Museum is now located in another historic building in MacMahon Street.

The Hurstville train crash on 3 August 1920 resulted in five people killed and fifty injured. It involved the collision of two steam trains, one arriving from Central Railway Station, which plunged into the back of the other, which was stationary at Hurstville railway station, bound for Sutherland.

Hurstville's residential developments are a mixture of low-density housing, medium-density flats, and high-density apartment buildings.

== Economy ==
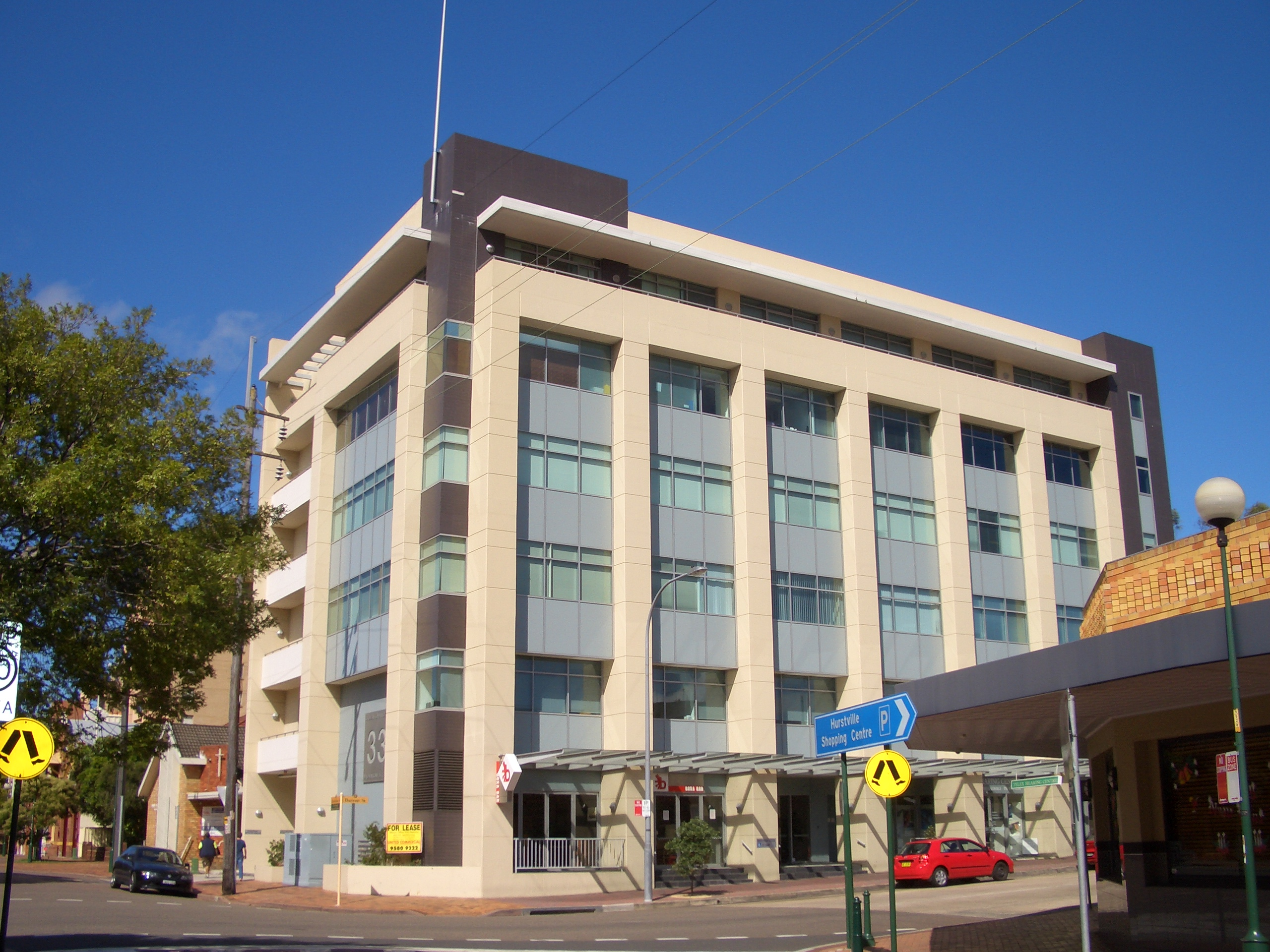
The Global Chambers office building

Hurstville is the central business district of the St George area. It is a large, multiethnic suburb with a multitude of commercial buildings and high-rise residential buildings dominating the skyline.

The commercial area is centred on the main street, Forest Road, on the northern side of Hurstville railway station. Forest Road is the main shopping street which features branches of many retail shops as well as numerous banks (Commonwealth, ANZ, National Australia Bank, Westpac, St George, HSBC, Bank of China) and other financial institutions. The commercial developments also extend to surrounding streets concentrated from Queens Road to The Avenue and on the southern side of Hurstville Railway station, around Ormonde Parade. The commercial developments extend further along Forest Road, west towards Penshurst and east towards Bexley.

=== Retail and shopping ===
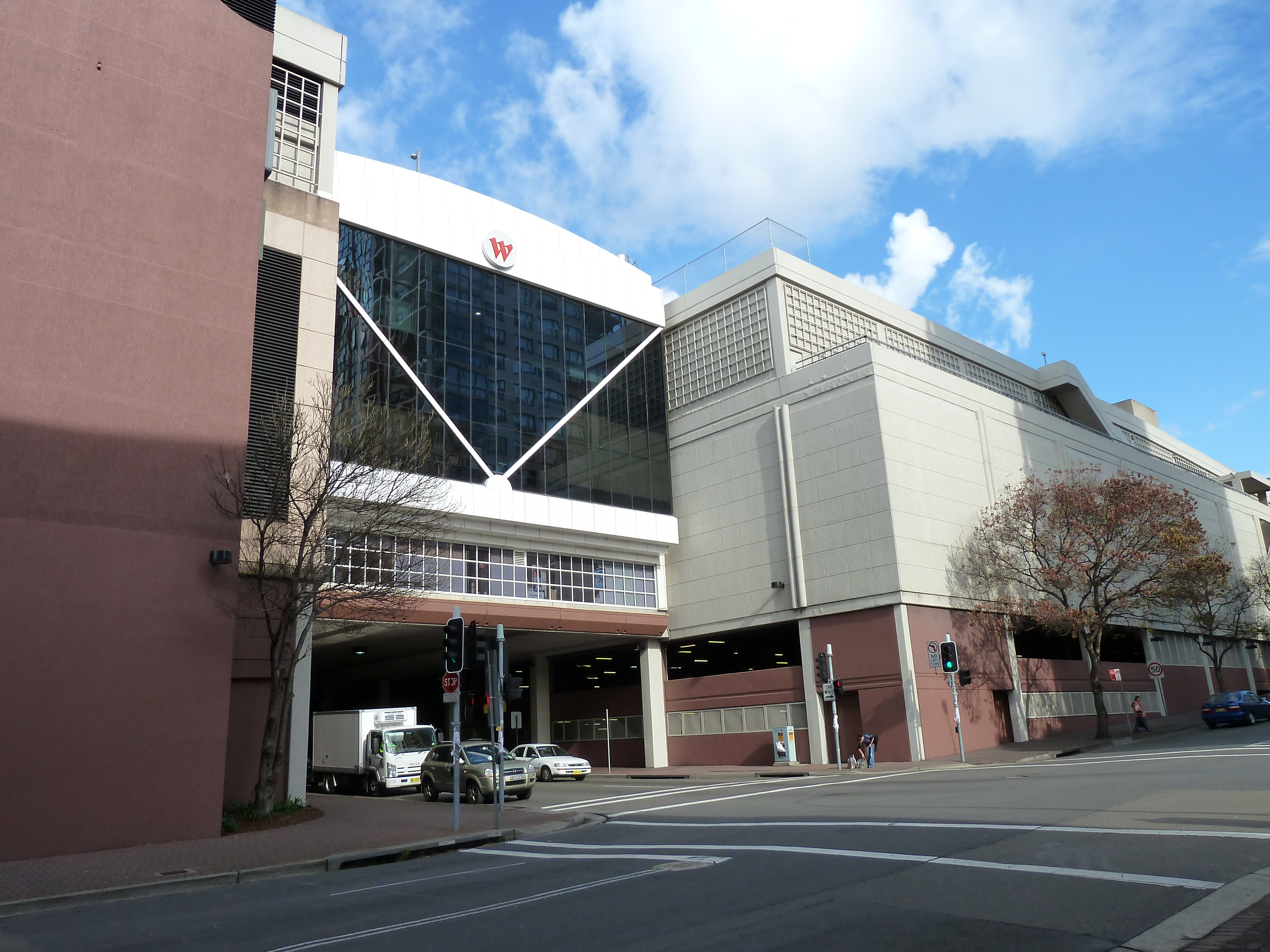
Westfield Hurstville

Hurstville has two major shopping centres, Westfield Hurstville and Hurstville Central. There are also a few smaller shopping centres such as Hurstville Times Plaza, East Quarter, Metro Centre, Hurstville City Centre and Union Arcade.

=== Restaurants and cafes ===
Hurstville has a wide variety of restaurants and cafes and is known as a major dining destination in the St George area of Sydney. There are a large number of Chinese (including Cantonese), Japanese and Vietnamese restaurants and eateries.

=== Other ===
The administrative offices of the Georges River Council are located in the Hurstville Civic Centre in MacMahon Street. This street also features a number of historic buildings such as the Friendly Pharmacy, old Fire Station, Ritz Hotel and Hurstville Museum & Gallery (formerly known as the St George Regional Museum), which houses the cake decorating collection formerly held at the Australian Cakes and Sugar Art Museum. Hurstville City Library is located nearby on Queens Road.

== Culture ==
The St Clair Recording Studio operated for about a year from December 1965 to December 1966 and recorded the Bee Gees among other musicians. AC/DC played at the Hurstville Civic Centre (Marana Hall/Rivoli Hall) on eight occasions between 1974 and 1977.

The Hurstville Museum & Gallery focuses on local history, art, and culture. According to the museum's website, it "is home to high quality exhibitions, a diverse range of public programs and a collection of approximately 5,000 objects and artworks from the local area."

== Transport ==
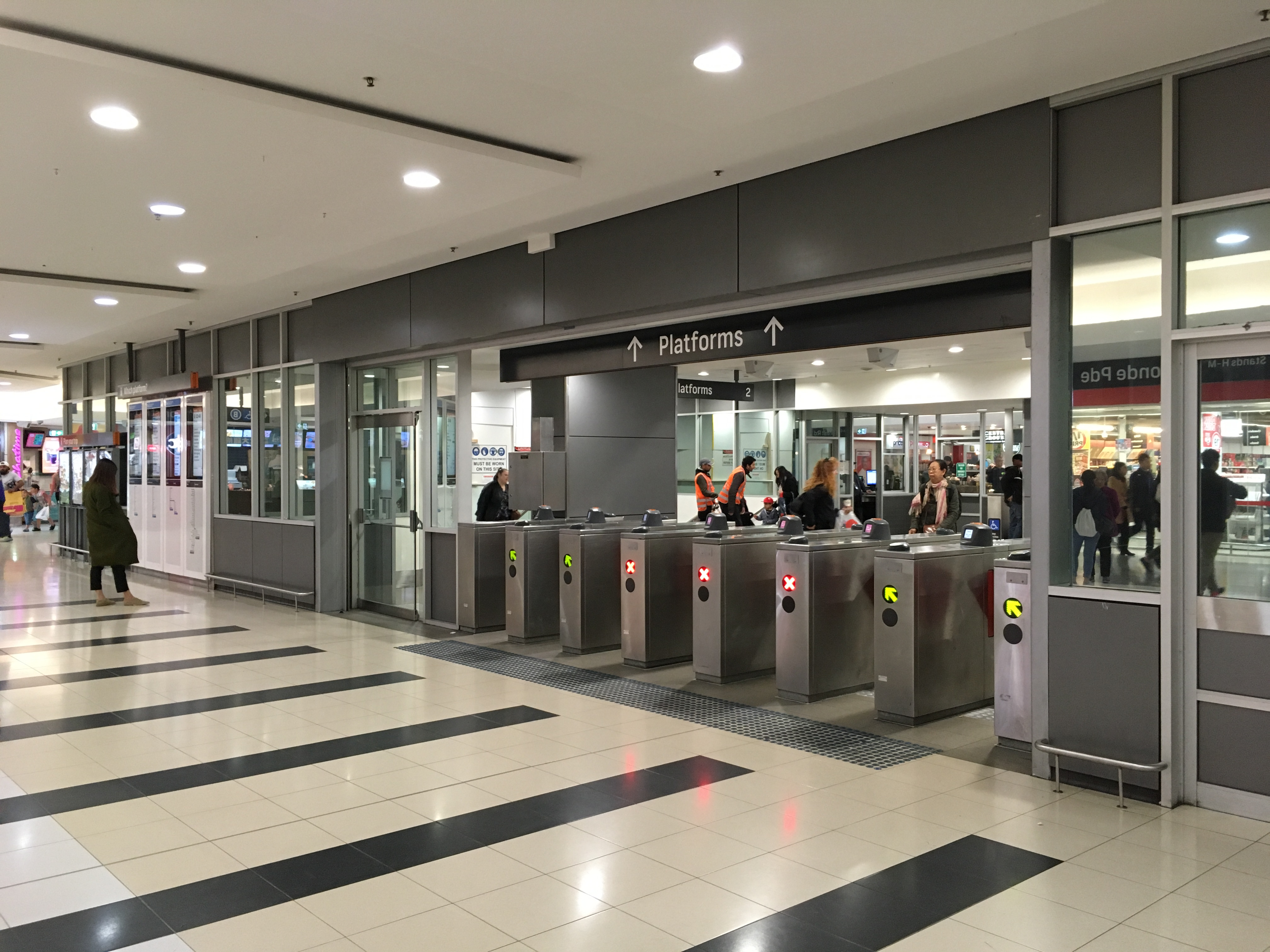
Hurstville railway station

Hurstville railway station is a major station on the T4 Eastern Suburbs & Illawarra Line of the Sydney Trains network and the South Coast Line on the NSW TrainLink network. All Suburban and Intercity trains stop at Hurstville. Hurstville is 20 minutes from Sydney Central railway station on the express service. Hurstville is a major bus interchange with bus services departing from Forest Road and Ormonde Parade.

Hurstville is also serviced by St George Community Transport, a HACC funded transport service for the Frail Aged, people with disability and their carers.

== Churches ==
- St George's Hurstville Anglican Church
- St Michael's Roman Catholic Church
- Hurstville Presbyterian Church
- Hurstville Church of Christ
- Hurstville Uniting Church
- Hurstville Seventh-day Adventist Church
- Hurstville Assemblies of God
- Salvation Army
- Church of the Living God
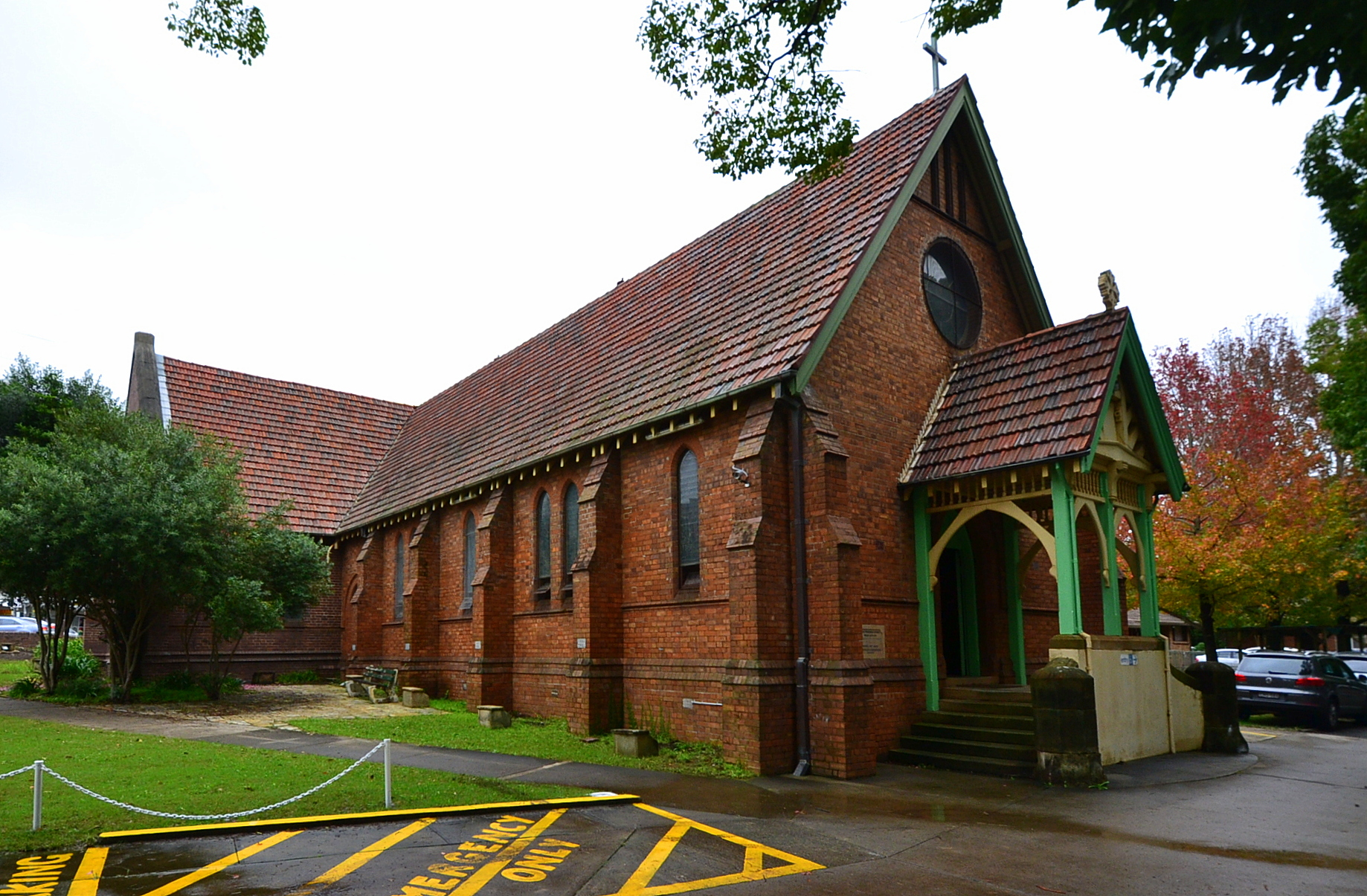
St George's Hurstville Anglican Church

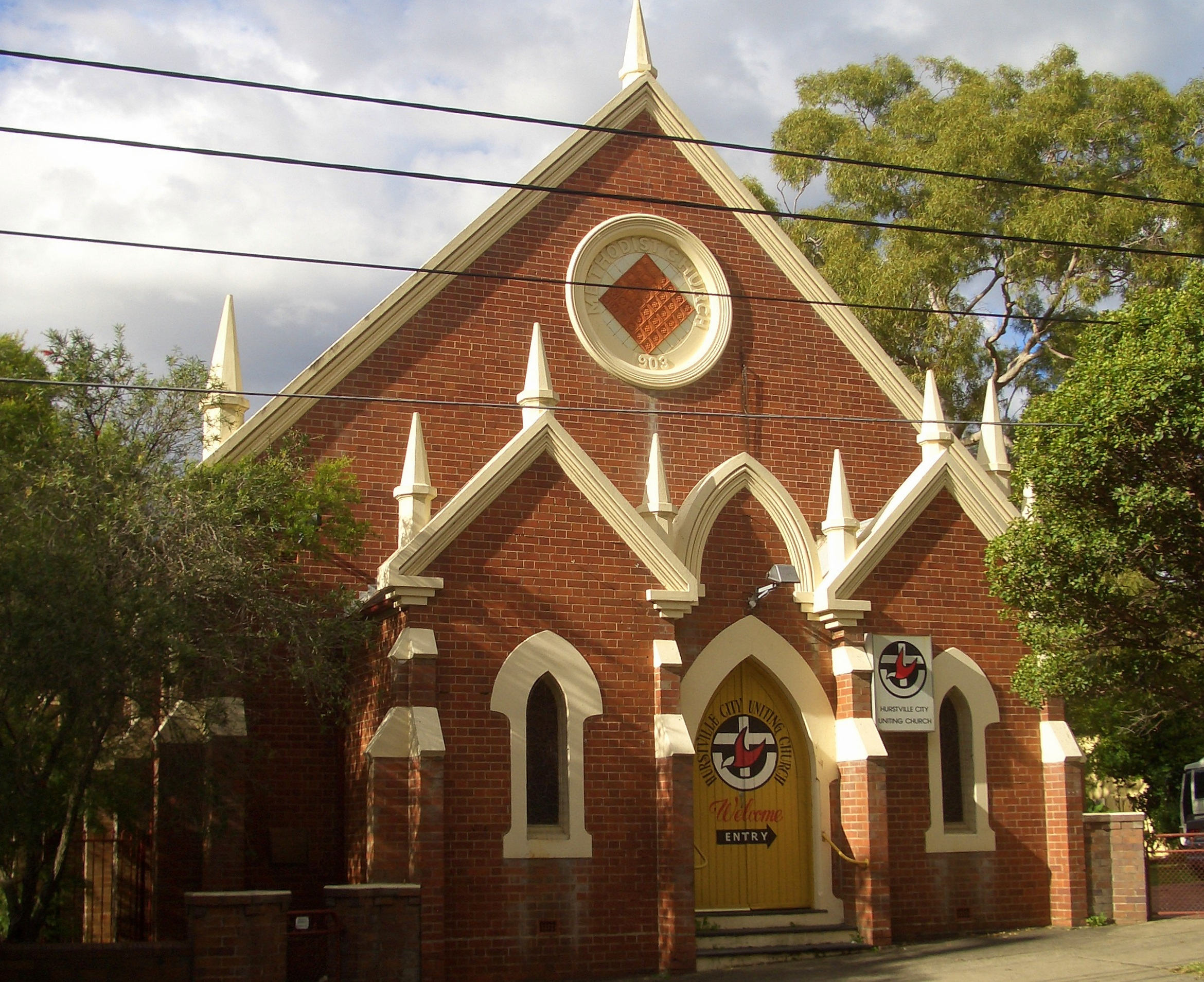
Hurstville Uniting Church

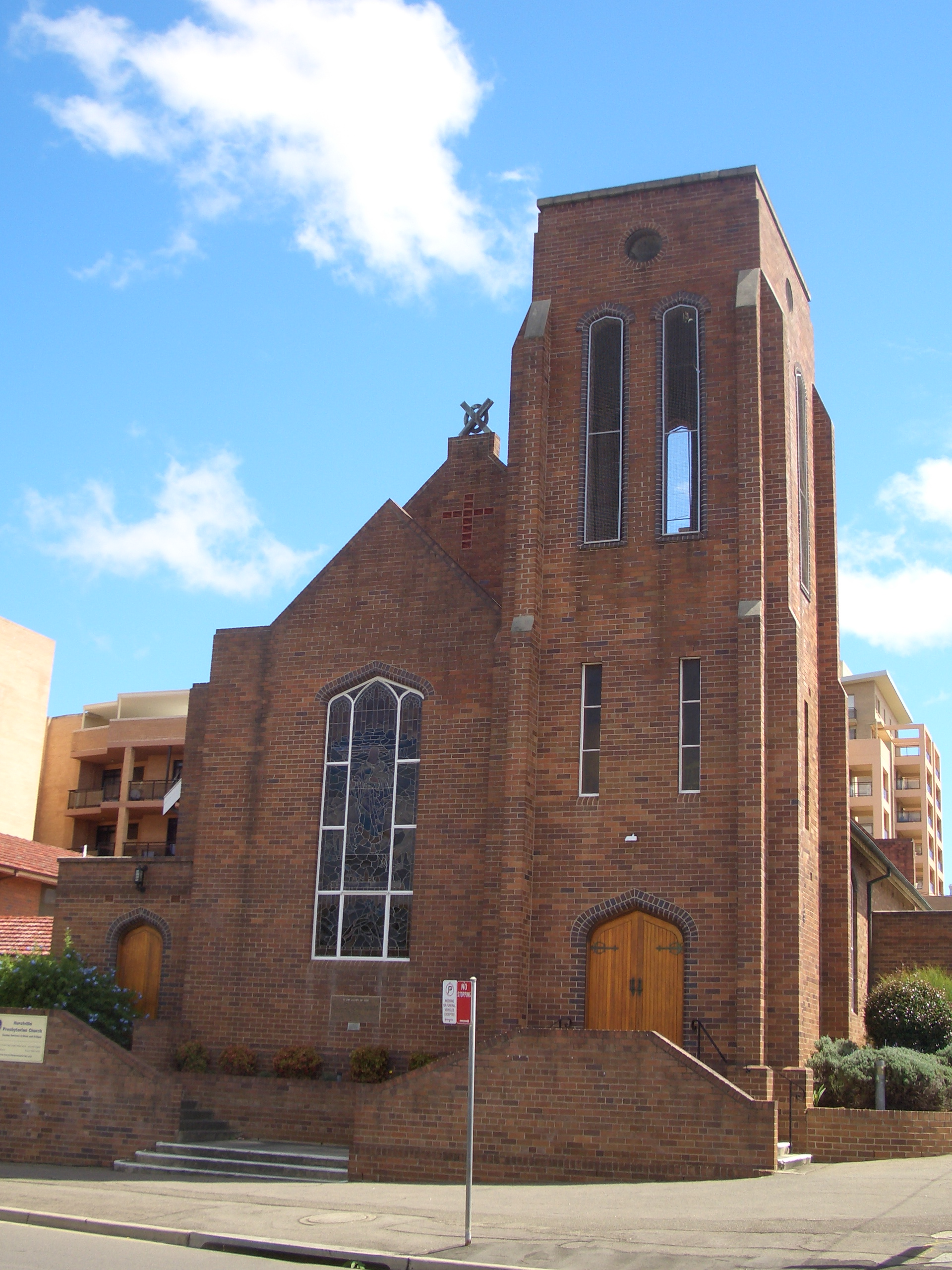
Hurstville Presbyterian Church

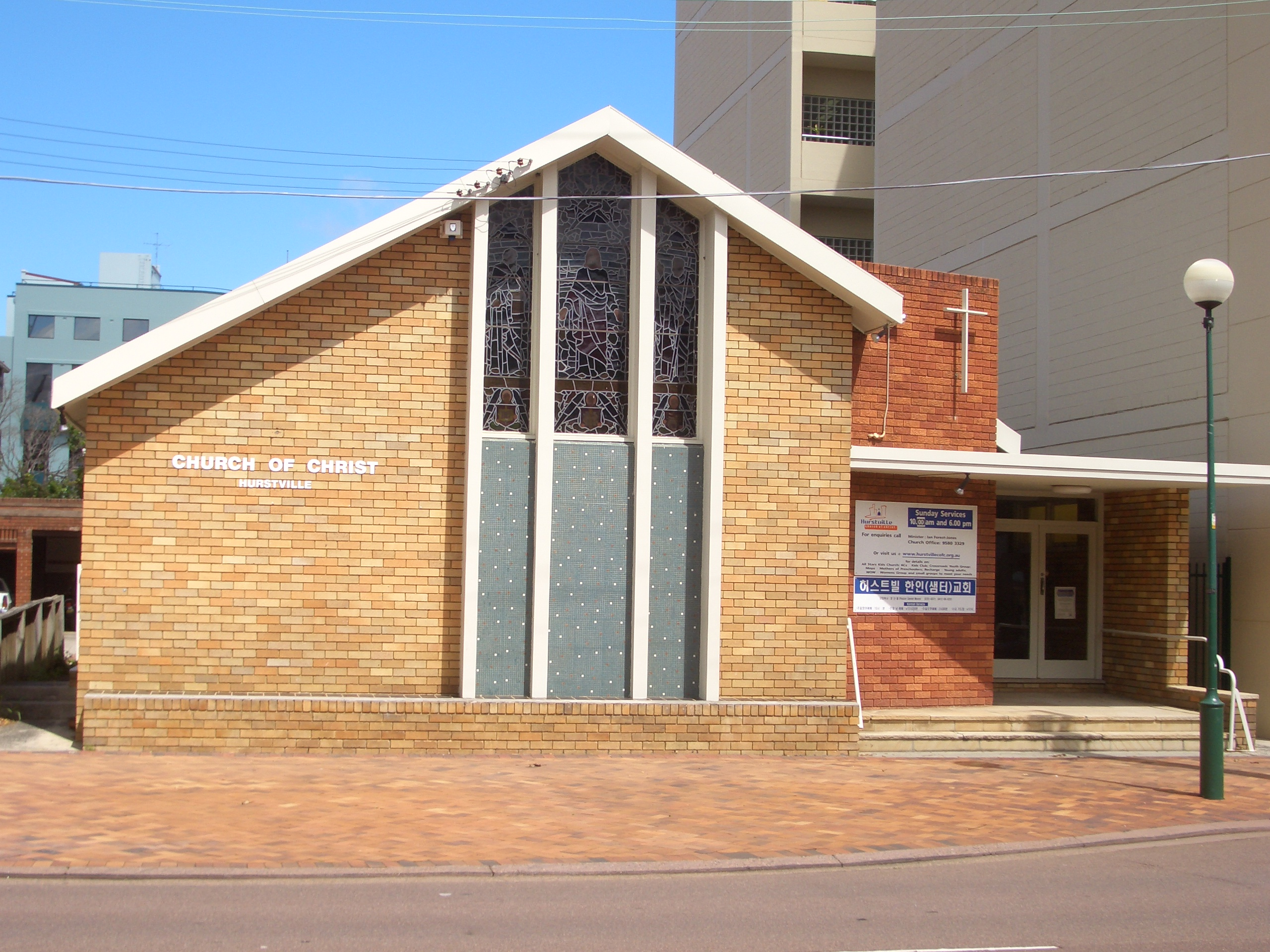
Church of Christ

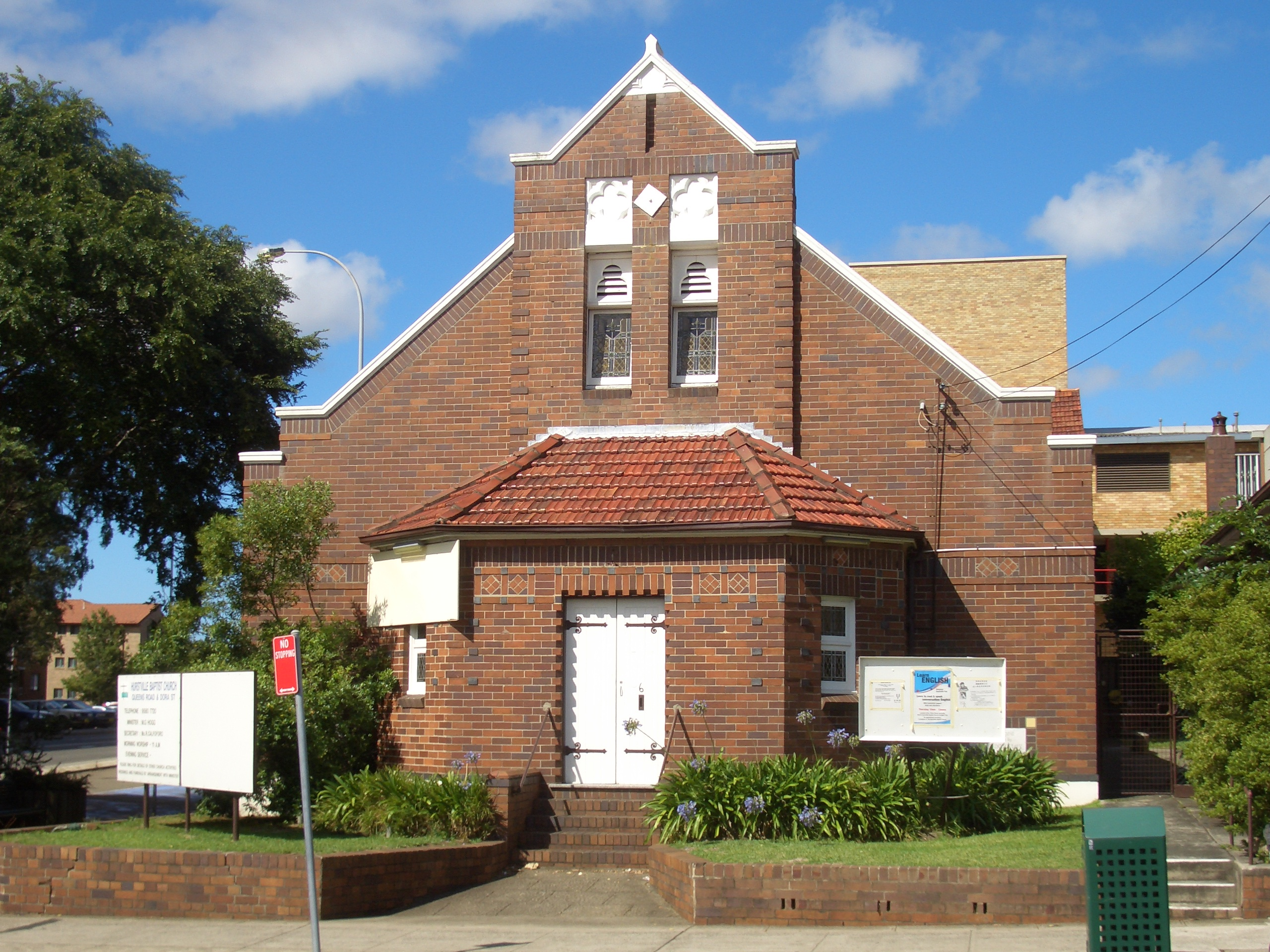
Hurstville Baptist Church

== Schools ==
- Hurstville Adventist School
- Hurstville Boys High School
- Hurstville Public School
- Hurstville South Public School
- Danebank Anglican Girls School
- Hurstville Grove Infants School
- Beverly Hills Public School and St George Christian School.
- Sydney Technical High School, Bethany College and St. Mary's Star of the Sea Catholic Primary School – all located just over the border in Bexley.
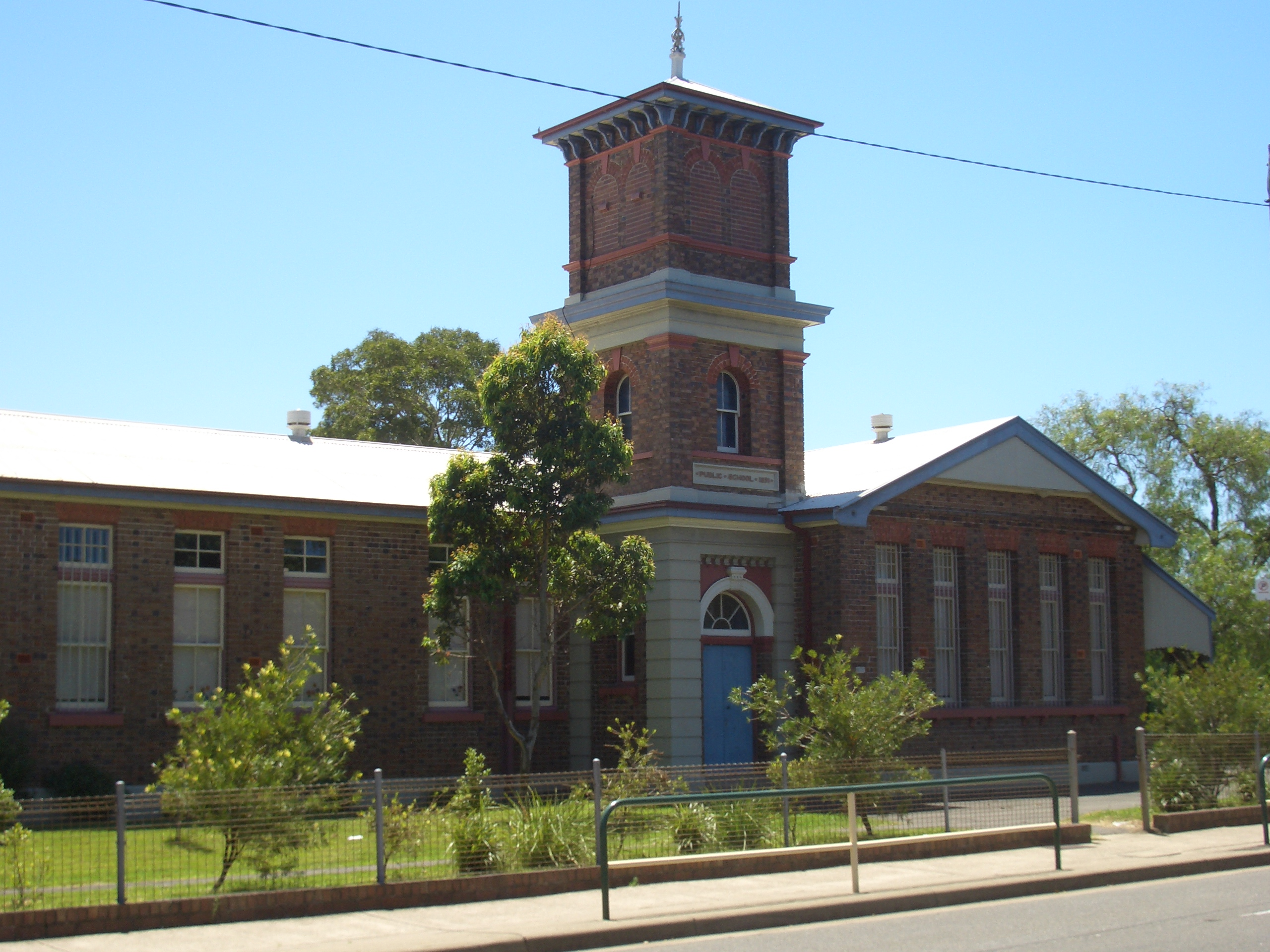
Hurstville Public School

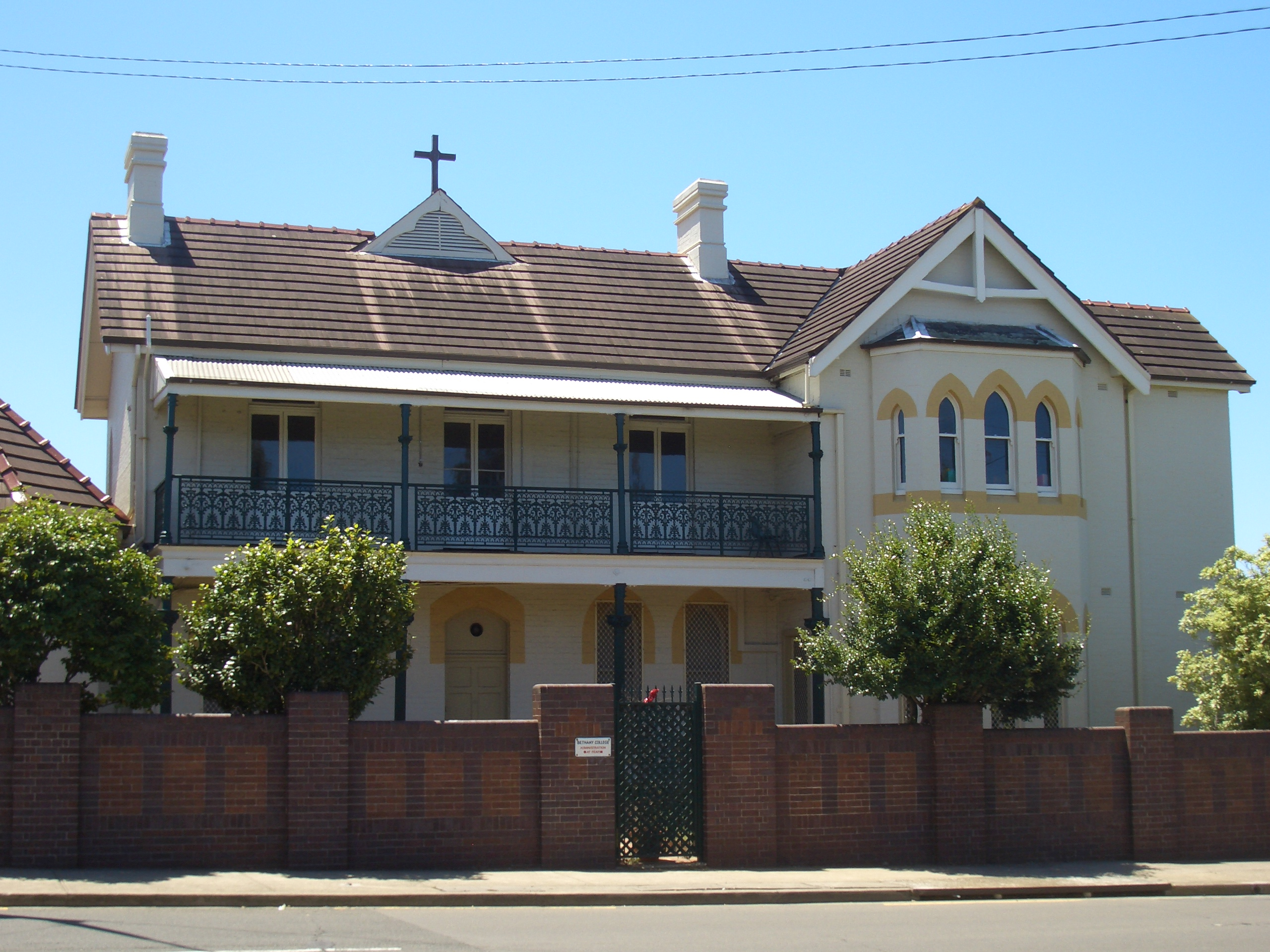
Bethany College

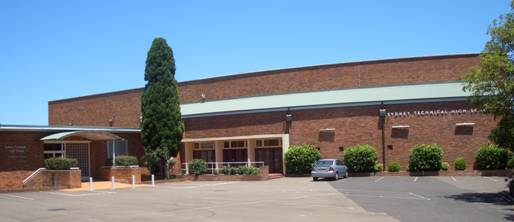
Sydney Technical High School

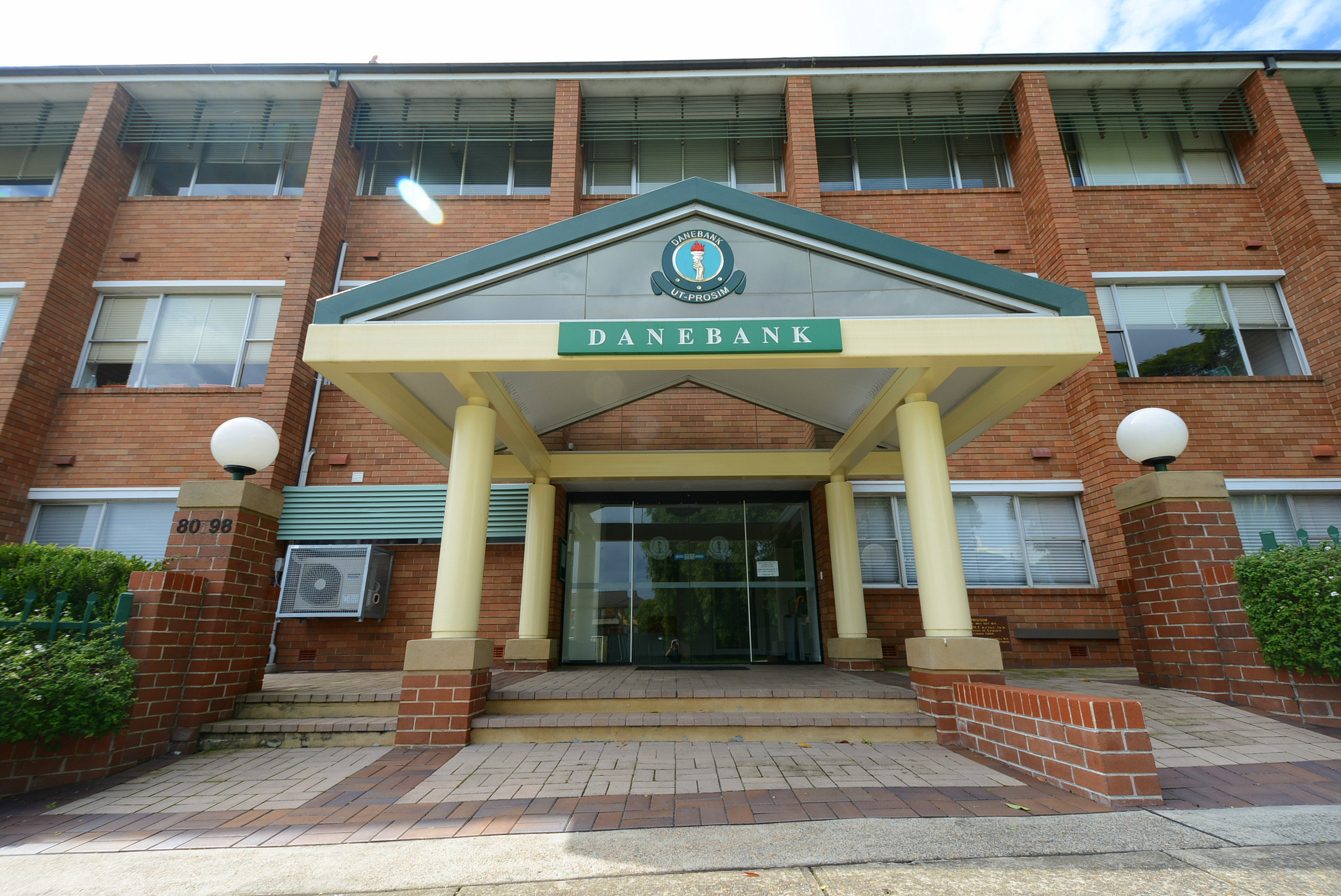
Danebank Girls' School

== Landmarks ==
- Hurstville Civic Centre, Hurstville Entertainment Centre, Hurstville City Library, St George Regional Museum, Park Plaza Apartments
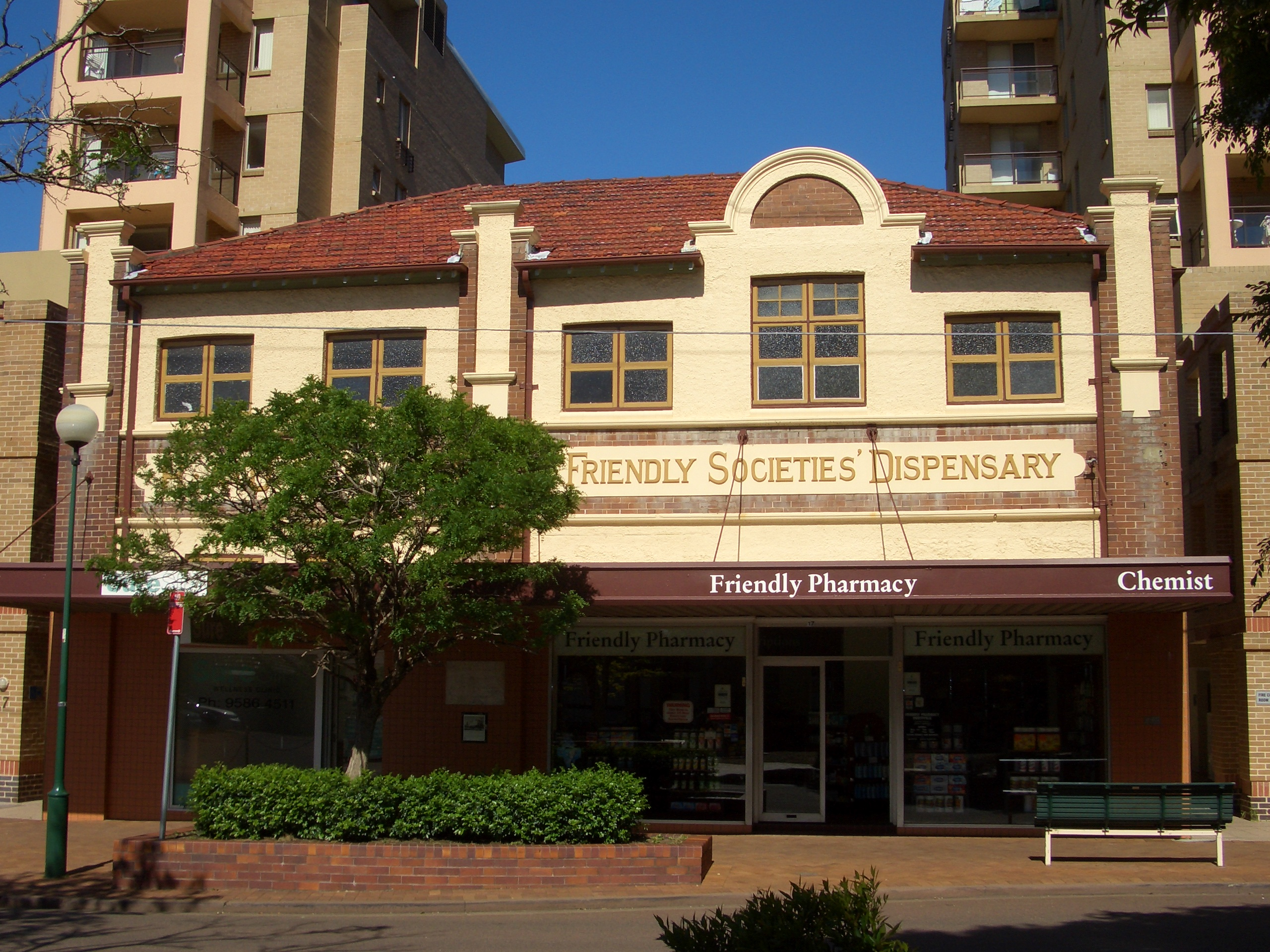
Friendly Pharmacy, MacMahon Street

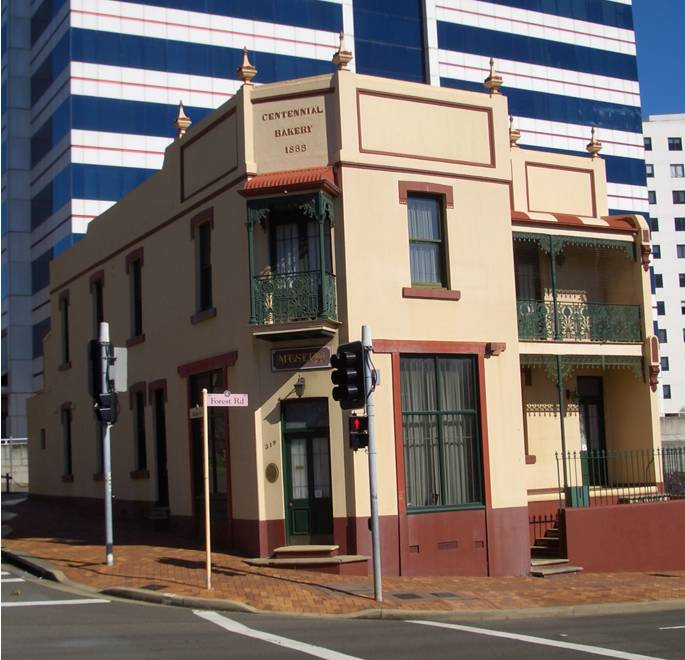
Centenary Bakery, Forest Road

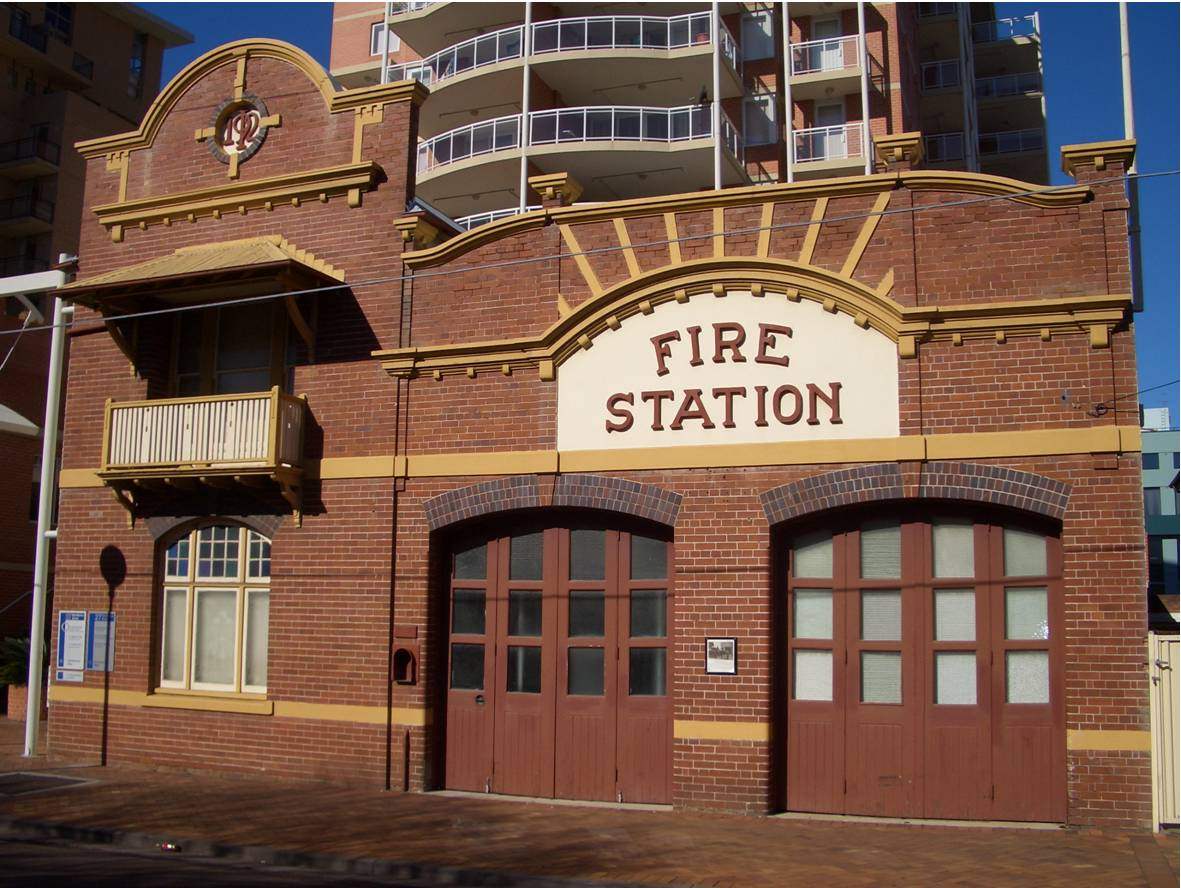
Old Fire Station, MacMahon Street

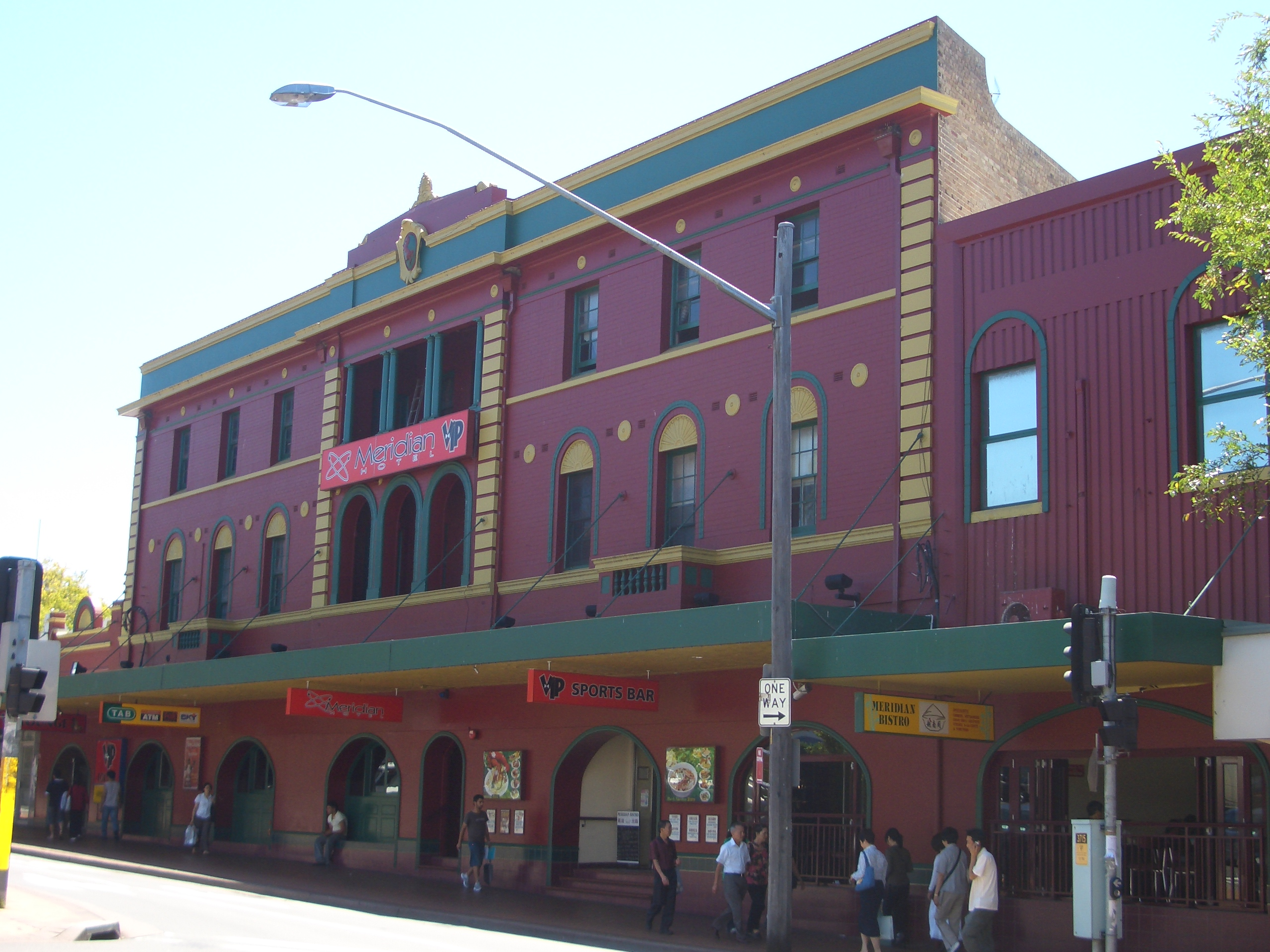
Meridian Hotel

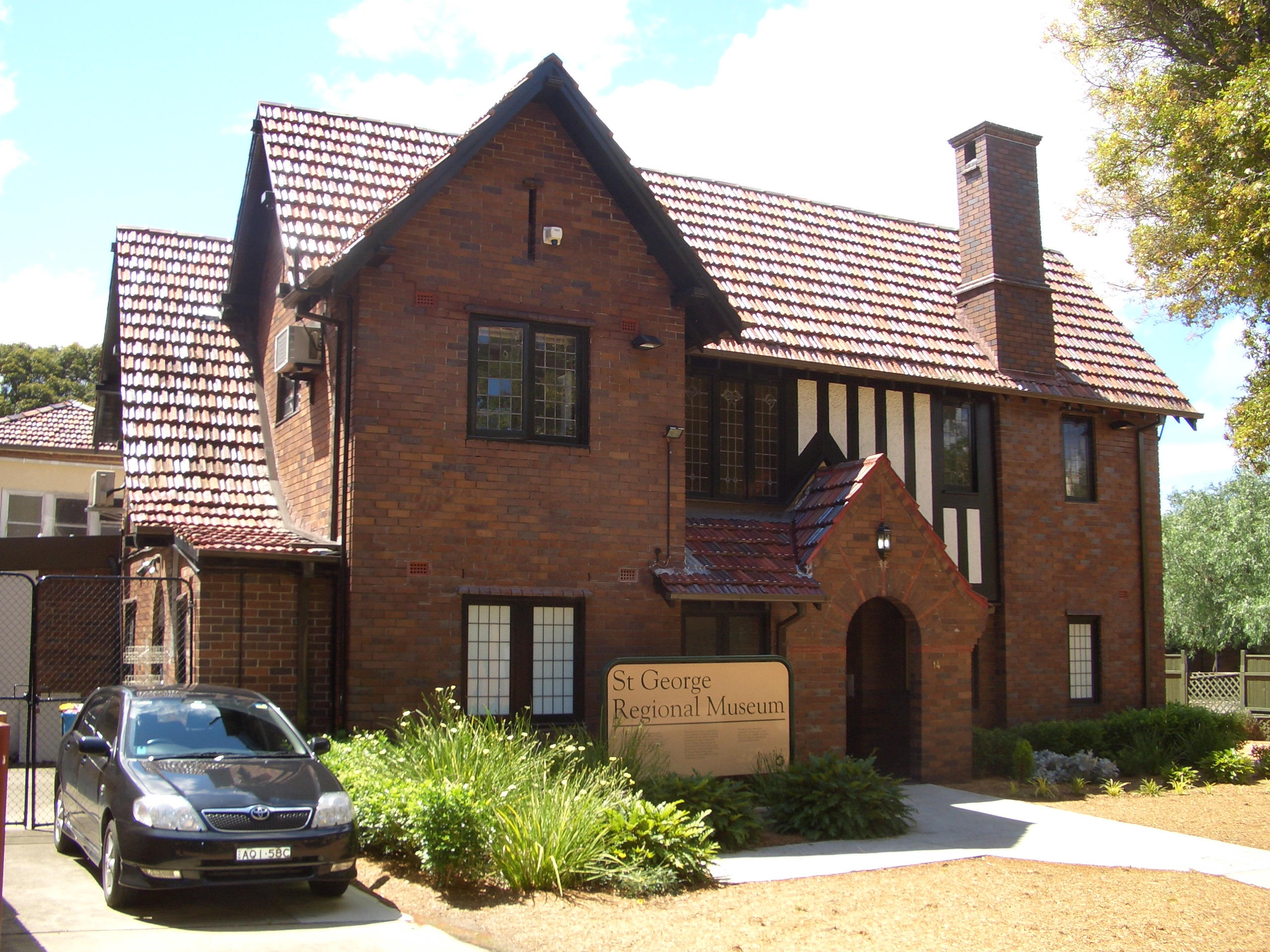
Hurstville City Museum & Gallery

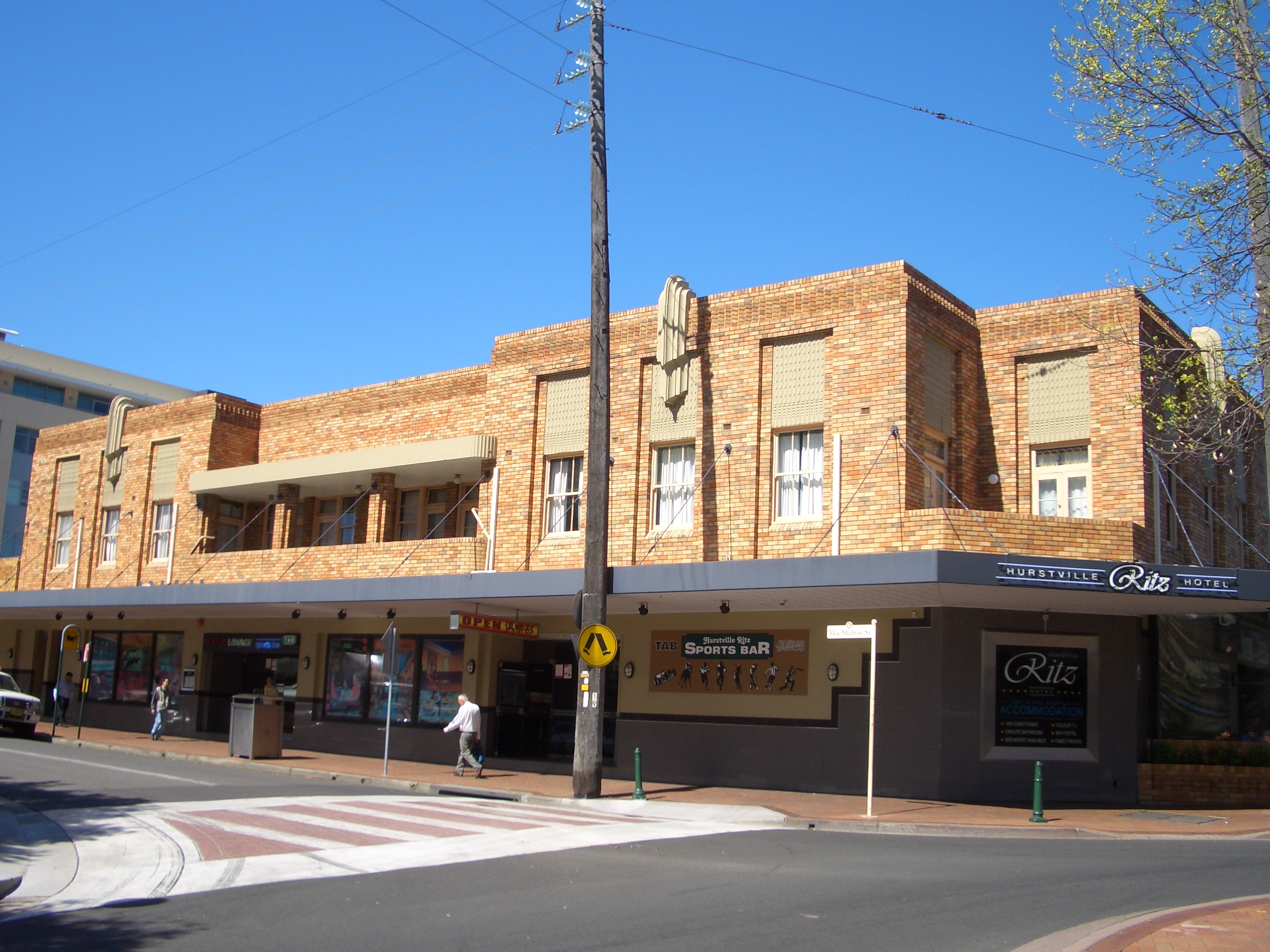
Hurstville Ritz Hotel, Forest Road

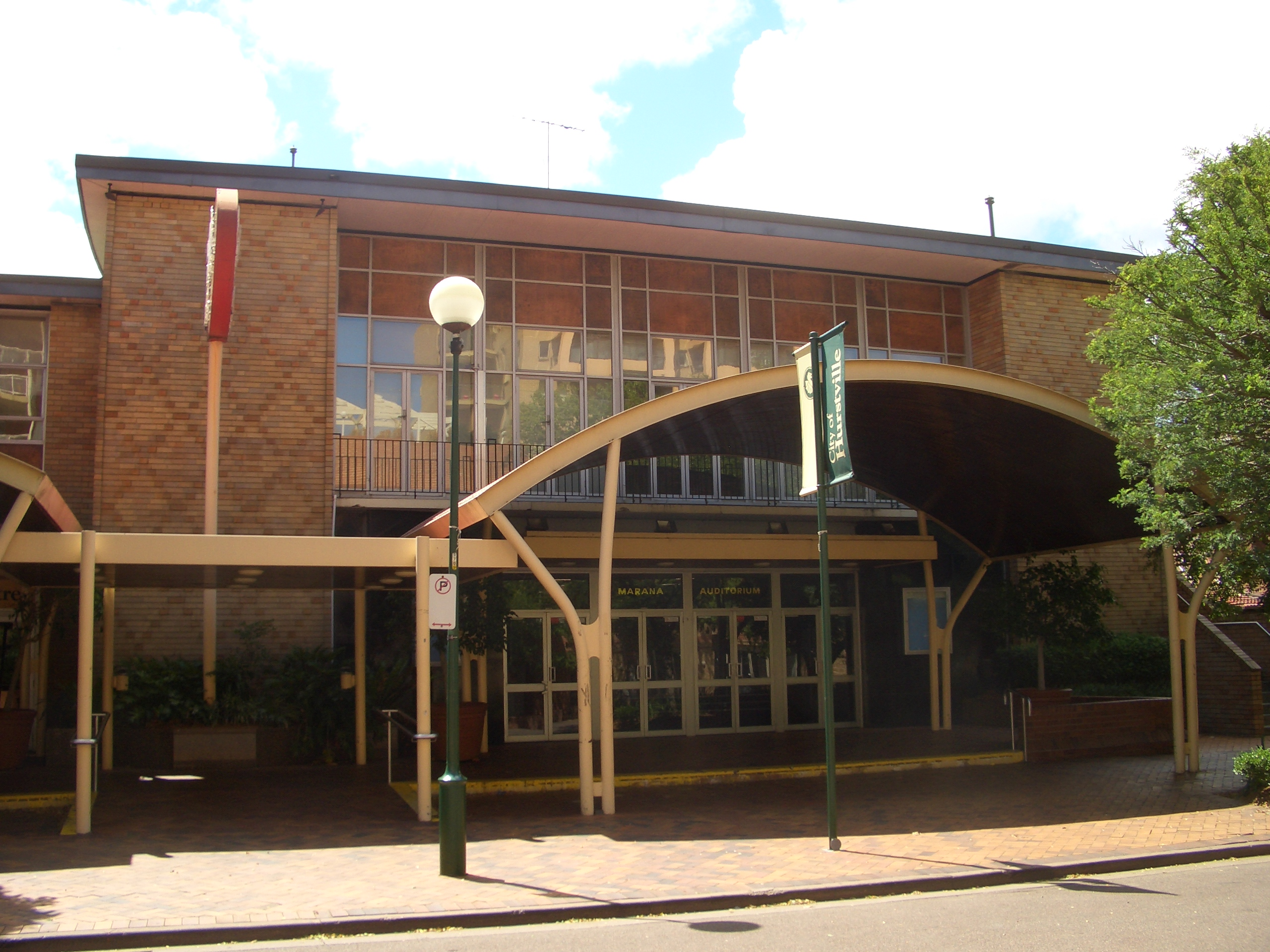
Hurstville Entertainment Centre

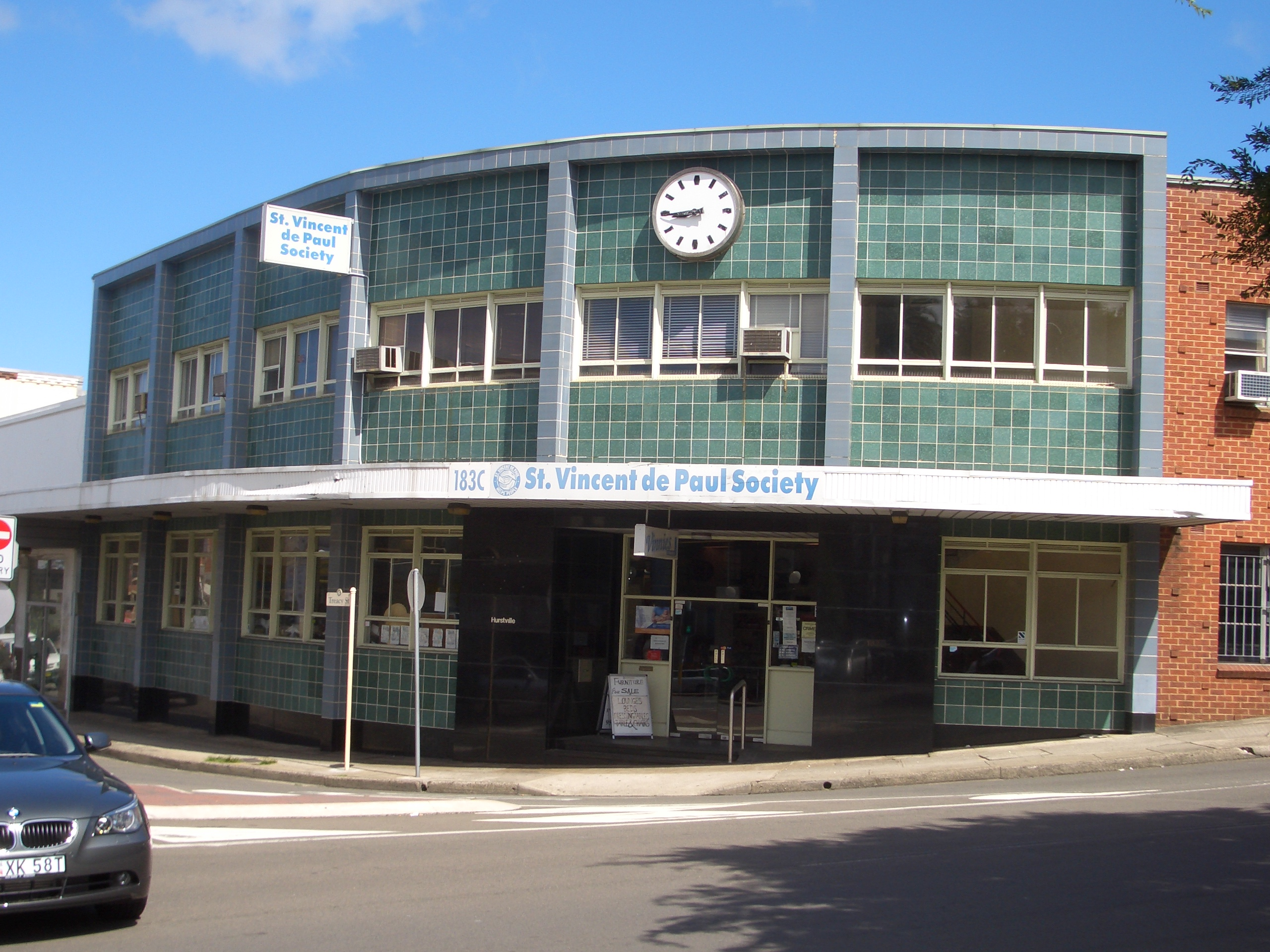
former State Bank building, Hurstville

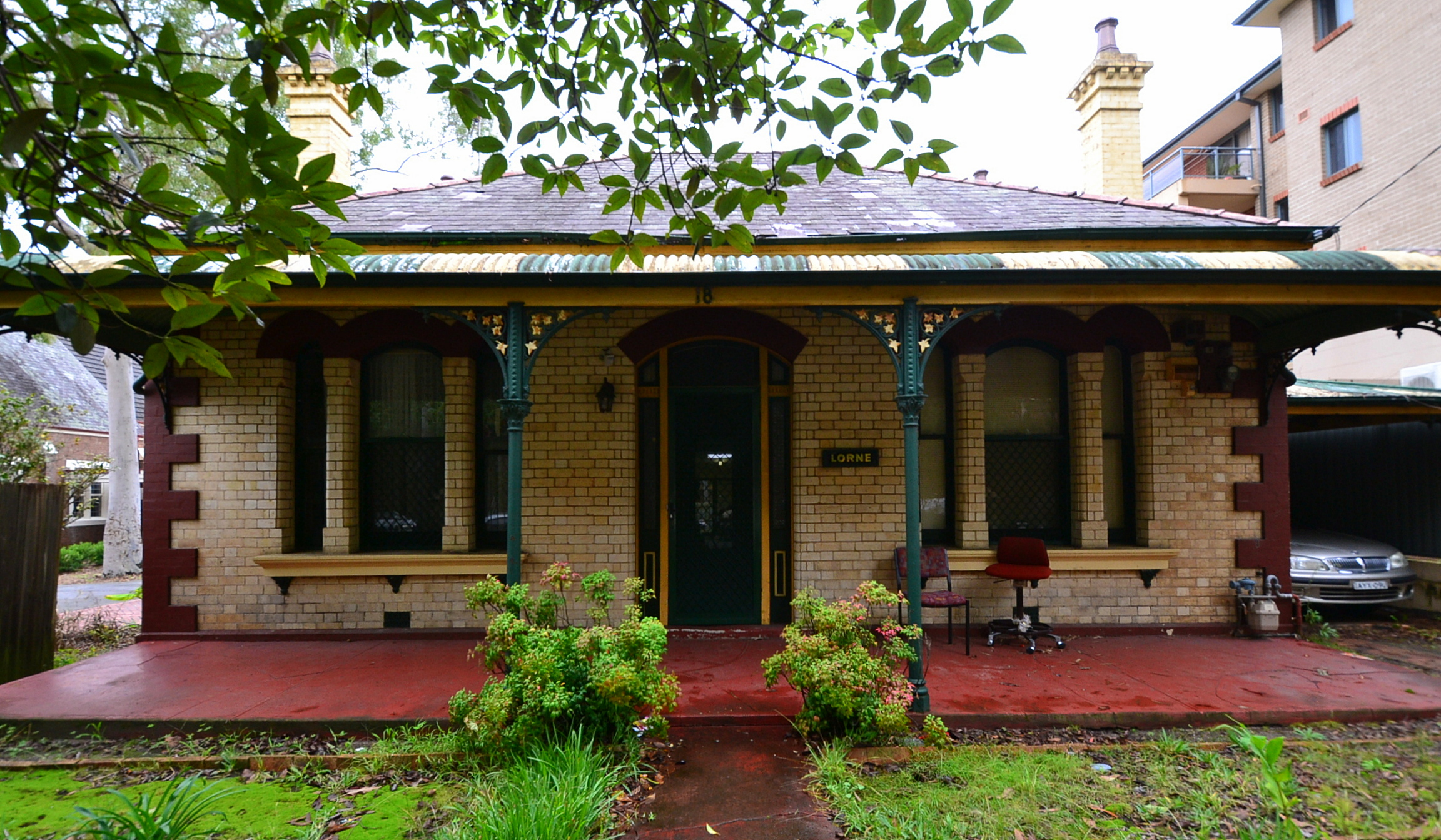
Lorne, The Avenue

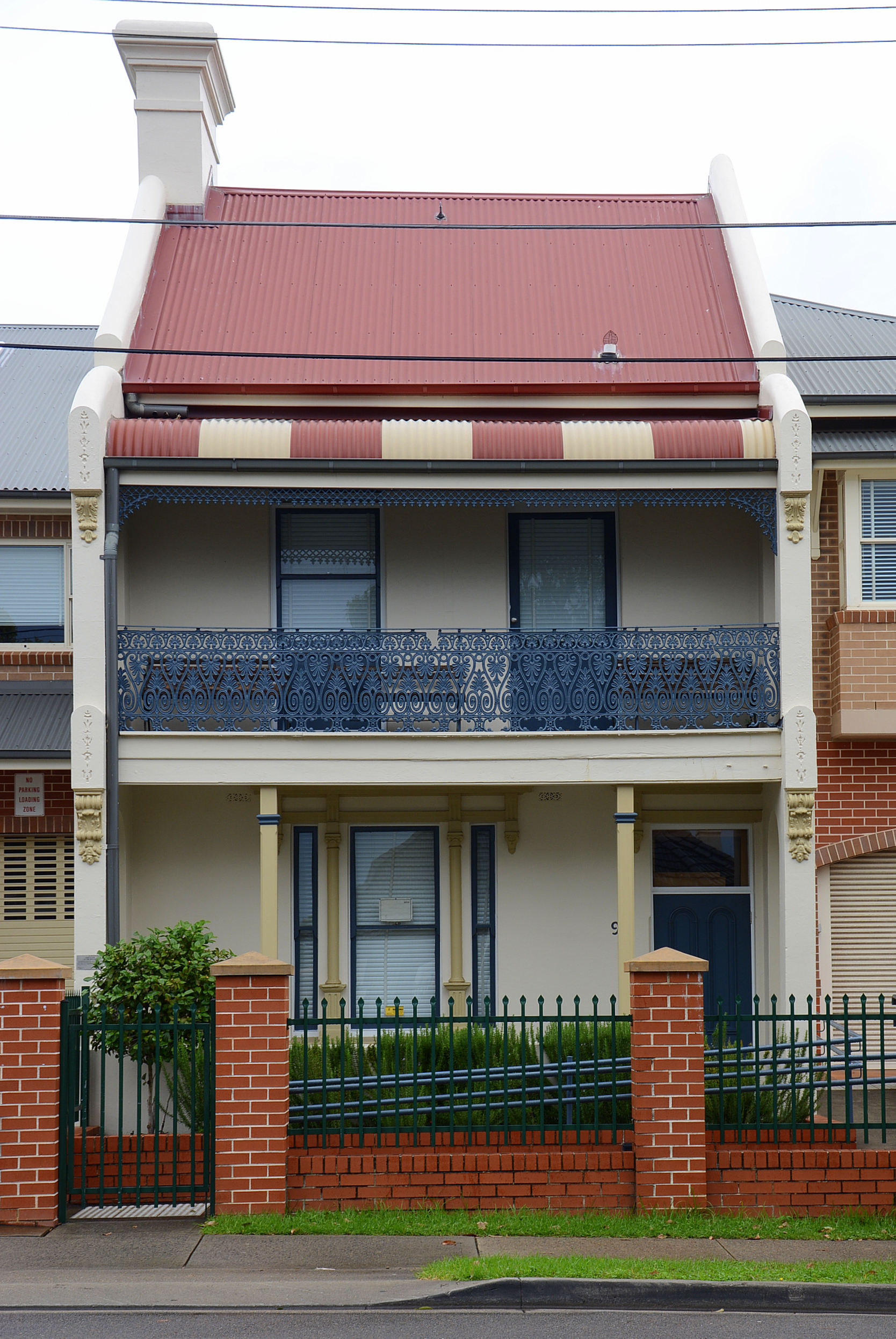
Terraced housing on The Avenue

== Parks ==
- Kempt Field, Woodville Park, Hurstville Park, Thorpe Park, Doyle Gardens.
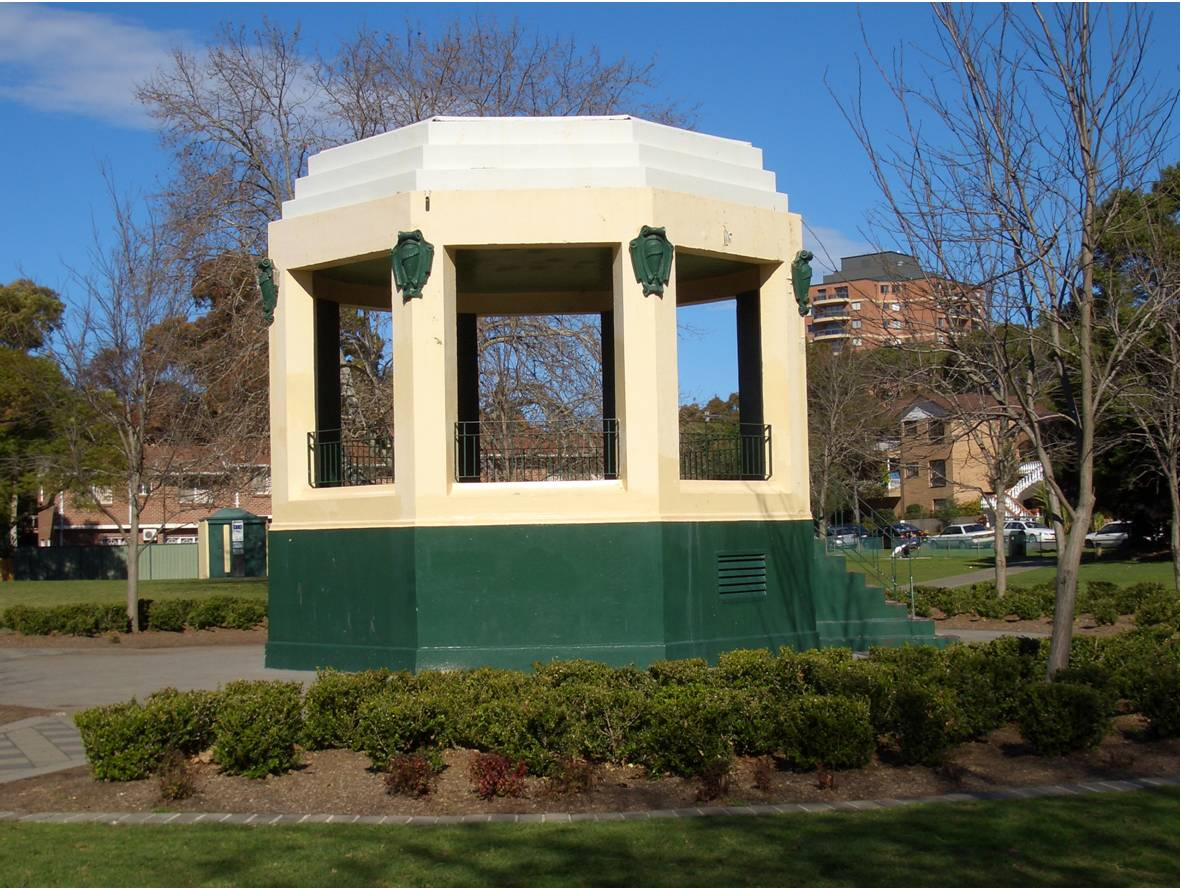
Woodville Park

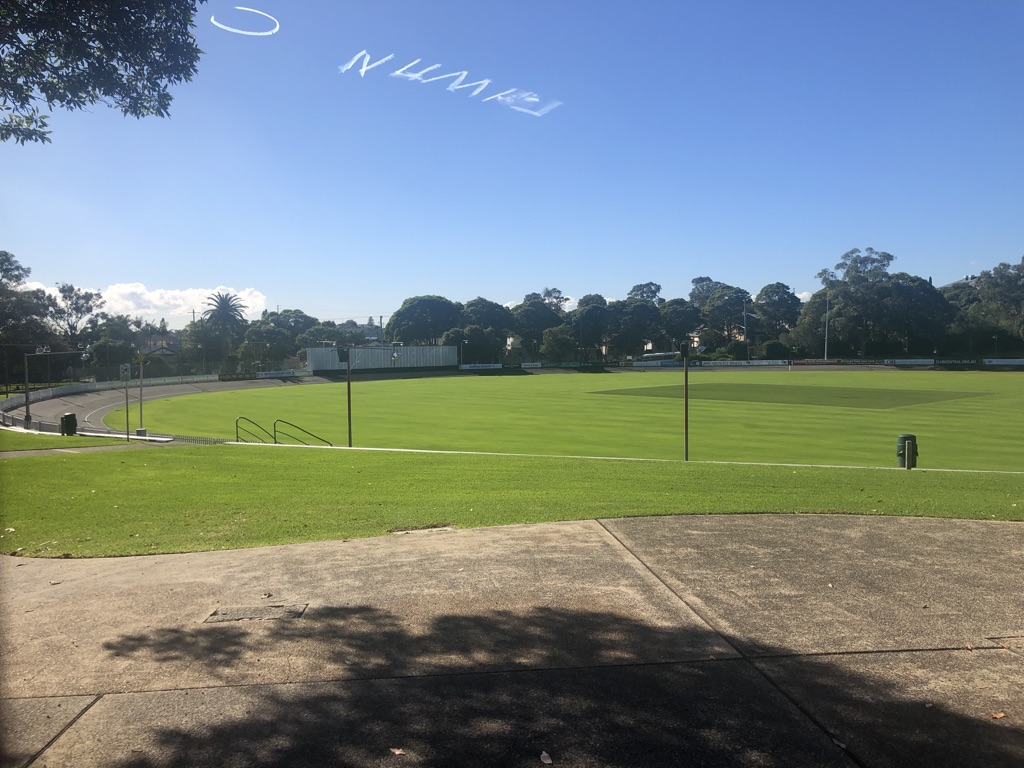
Hurstville Oval

== Population ==
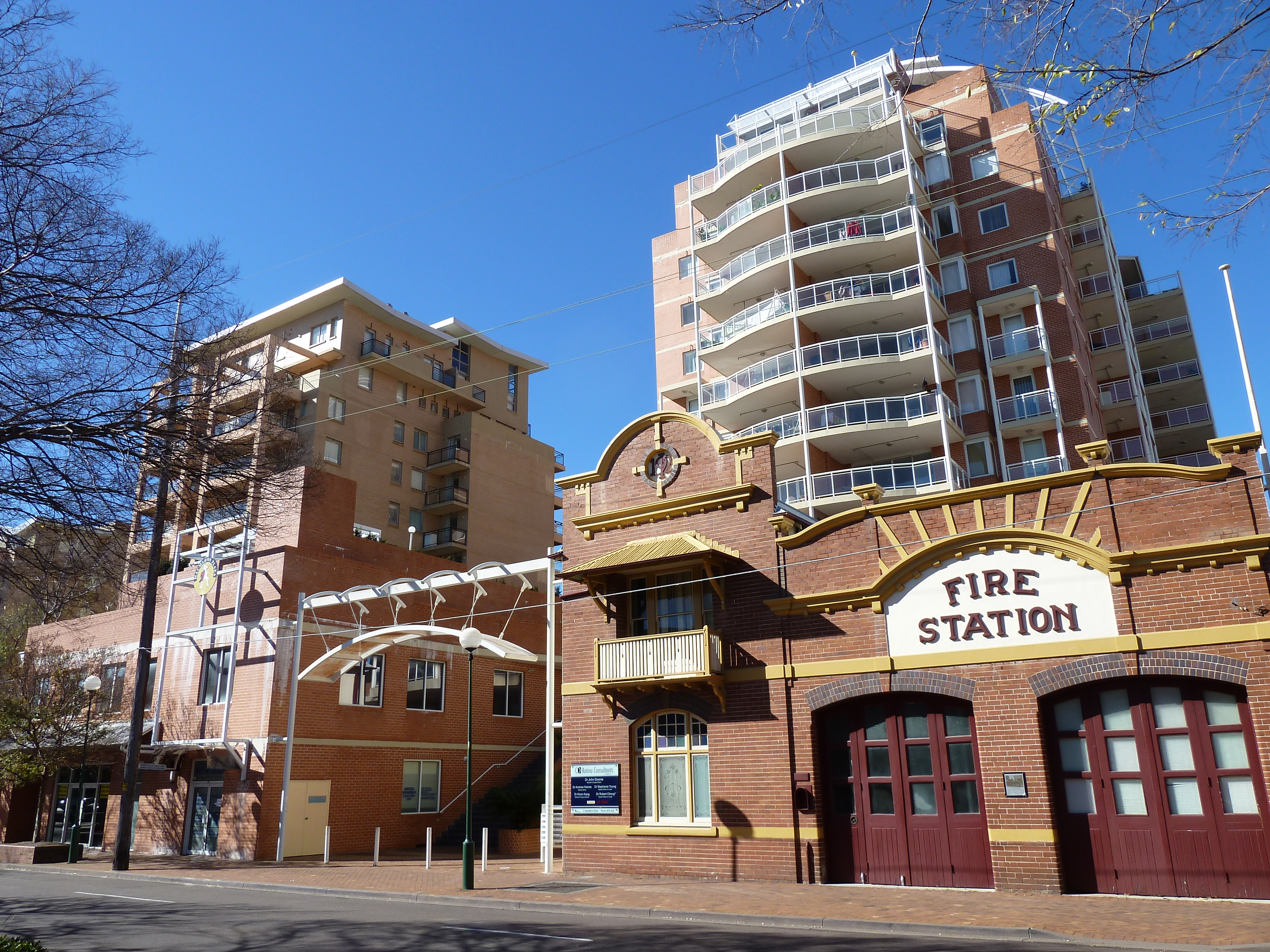
Apartments on MacMahon Street

=== Demographics ===
Historical population
Year	Pop.	±%
2001	20,371	—
2006	23,331	+14.5%
2011	26,040	+11.6%
2016	29,822	+14.5%
2021	31,162	+4.5%

The first European settlers in the area were mostly of British and Irish ancestry. From the late 1960s, Hurstville, like many surrounding areas, became home to migrants from all around the world. The first wave of migrants included Greeks and Italians who began moving south from Sydney's inner-city suburbs. They were followed by more European migrants, including many from the former Yugoslavia.

From the 1990s, the Chinese community within Hurstville has grown considerably. Much of this was related to significant migration from Hong Kong during the 1990s and migration from mainland China during the 2000s. Many local businesses are operated by people of Chinese background, the interests of which are advanced by the St. George Asian Business Association. Hurstville is a hub for Asian groceries, food and services.

According to the 2021 census, there were 31,162 residents in Hurstville. 28.1% of people were born in Australia. The most common countries of birth were China 28.6%, Nepal 15.8%, Hong Kong 3.6%, Indonesia 1.8% and Philippines 1.7%. 18.4% of people only spoke English at home. Other languages spoken at home included Mandarin 26.1%, Cantonese 16.2%, Nepali 15.4%, Arabic 2.6% and Greek 2.1%. The most common responses for religion were No Religion 38.6%, Hinduism 15.5%, Catholic 11.2%, Buddhism 8.5% and Not stated 6.2%. The most common ancestries in Hurstville were Chinese 47.1%, Nepalese 15.6%, English 7.4%, Australian 5.7% and Greek 2.9%.

== Notable residents ==
- Cecil Abbott AO, QPM – Commissioner of the New South Wales Police (1981–1984)
- Ronald Ernest Aitchison – physicist
- Arthur Samuel Allen (1894–1959) – army officer and accountant, audit clerk in NSW Government Railways
- Ezekiel Baker – politician
- Roy Bossi (1894–1964) – rugby league player
- Jack Brabham (1926–2014) – three-time Formula One World Champion motor racer
- Jayden Brailey – rugby league player playing for the Newcastle Knights
- Matthew Dufty – rugby league player playing for the Warrington Wolves
- Ambrose George Enticknap (1894–1976) – orchardist and politician
- Stella Maria Sarah Miles Franklin – writer
- Neville Hayes – swimmer
- Arthur Justice (1902–1977) – rugby league player, coach, and administrator
- Thomas John Ley (1880–1947) – politician and murderer
- Jack Lindwall – rugby league player for St George
- Ray Lindwall – test cricketer, also played rugby league for St George; younger brother of Jack
- Craig Nicholls – musician
- Eris Michael O'Brien (1895–1974) – Catholic archbishop and Australian historian
- Kerry O'Keeffe – test cricketer and sportscaster
- Kurtis Patterson – test cricketer
- Riley Price – rugby league player playing for the North Queensland Cowboys
- Gordon Stanley Reid (1923–1989) – parliamentary official, political scientist and governor
- Ken Rosewall – tennis player
- Michael Rush – champion sculler, spent his last years farming a Hurstville small-holding.
