= St George Christian School =

Location
- Southern Sydney, New South Wales; Australia; 33°58′19″S 151°6′40″E

Information
- Type: Independent co-educational primary and secondary day school
- Motto: Mature in God
- Denomination: Non-denominational Christian
- Established: 1981; 45 years ago
- Educational authority: NSW Department of Education
- Chairman: Patrick Benn
- Principal: James Honor
- Staff: 90
- Years: K–12
- Enrolment: 900
- Campuses: Hurstville; Sans Souci
- Colours: Navy blue, cardinal red and white
- Slogan: Equipping your child for life
- Song: The Servant Song
- Affiliation: Christian Schools Australia
- Website: www.sgcs.com.au

St George Christian School is a multi-campus independent non-denominational Christian co-educational primary and secondary day school, located in Hurstville and Sans Souci, both suburbs of southern Sydney, in the St George area of New South Wales, Australia.

Established in 1981, the school has a non-selective enrolment policy, and currently caters for approximately 850 students from Kindergarten to Year 12, however students that start school at St George Christian School from Year 7 to Year 12 can only attend the schools St George Campus as the schools Sans Souci Campus is only for Kindergarten to Year 6 Students. Students come to St George Christian School mainly from the southern Sydney region.

St George Christian School is a member of Christian Schools Australia.

== Overview ==
St George Christian School was founded by five local Christian families in February 1981, with nine students from Kindergarten to Year 4. By 1984 the school was operating out of two campuses, and the first Year 12 class graduated in 1989. The first teacher was Hazel Burns. The school moved to double streaming in 1995 and triple streaming from Year 7 in 2003. The school implemented a Middle School in 2008 to cater for the specific needs of early adolescence. From 2009, there are four departments representing the particular educational needs of each stage of development.

- Infants School – Kindergarten to Year 2
- Junior School – Years 3 to 5
- Middle School – Years 6 to 8
- Senior School – Years 9 to 12

== Principals ==
The following men have served as Principals of St George Christian School:

Ordinal	Officerholder	Term start	Term end	Time in office	Notes
1	Bill Boon	1984	1991	6–7 years	
2	Colin Anderson	1992	1999	6–7 years	
3	Ian O'Harae	1999	2004	4–5 years	Years 7–12
3	James Honor	1999	incumbent	26–27 years	Years K–6, 1999–2004

== Campus ==
St George Christian School has two campuses: the main school at Hurstville (Junior, Middle and Senior Schools and the School Office), and the Infants at Sans Souci.

== Sport ==
Sport undertaken include: Swimming, Athletics, Cross Country Running, Netball, Tennis, Volleyball, Soccer, Basketball and Rope Skipping.

== House system ==
Upon entry to the school, each student is allocated, according to age and gender, or family tradition, to one of the four Houses:

Green House
Yellow House
Red House
Blue House

Houses form the basis for sporting and cultural competitions or interactions within the School, including:

- Athletics Carnivals
- Cross Country Carnivals
- Swimming Carnivals
- 'House Day' – students from Years 6–12 are involved in a Gala Day of various sporting tournaments.

== Notable alumni ==
- Marc Fennell - journalist
- Tim Tszyu - boxer
- Nikita Tszyu - boxer

== See also ==
- List of non-government schools in New South Wales
