= Cabramatta Creek =

Coordinates: 33°56′S 150°52′E

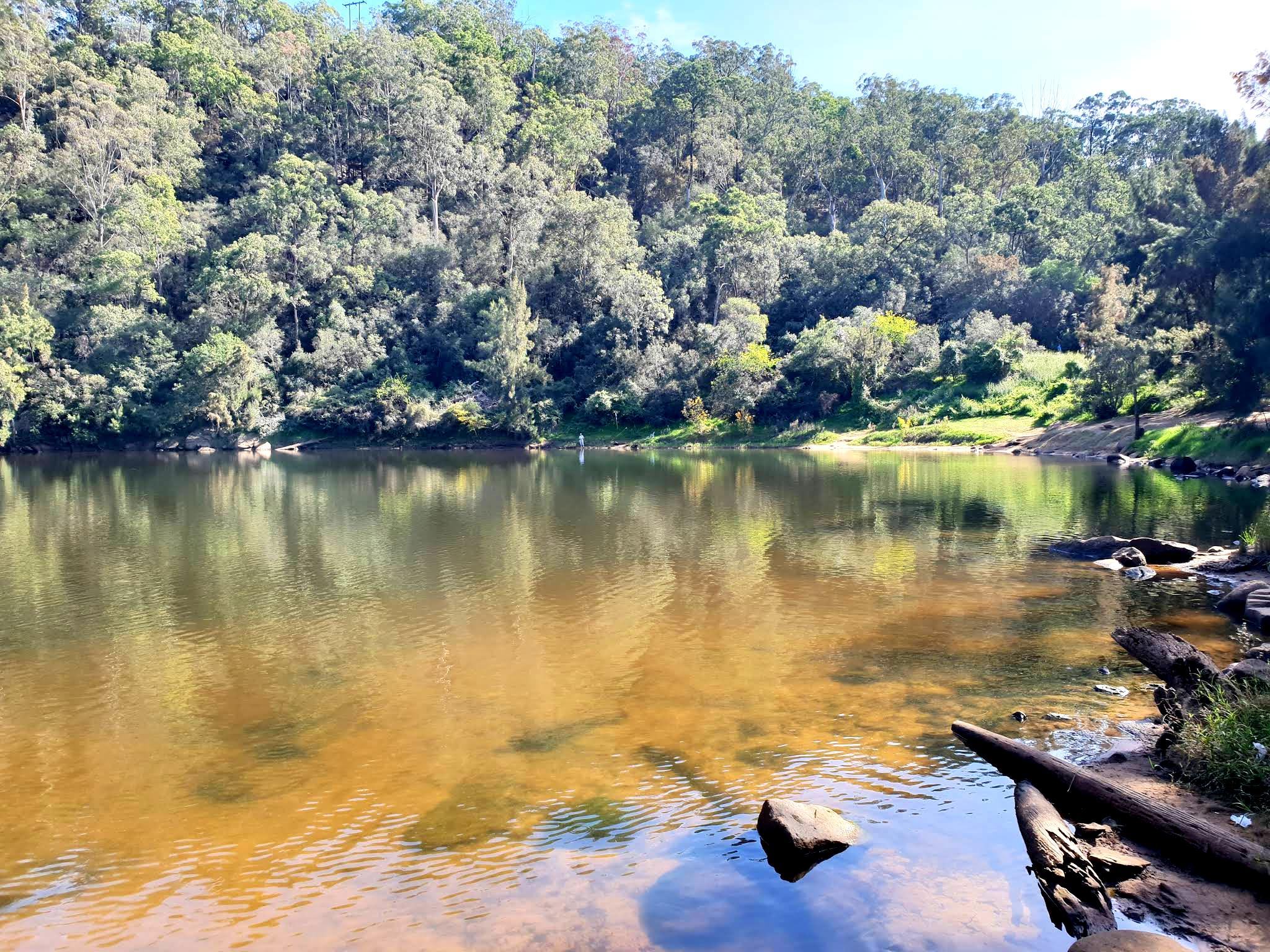
- The creek's billabong at Hoxton Park

Location
- Country: Australia
- State: New South Wales
- Region: Sydney Basin (IBRA), South Western Sydney
- Local government areas: Liverpool, Fairfield

Physical characteristics
- Source: Denham Court
  - location: near Leppington
- Mouth: confluence with the Georges River
  - location: Warwick Farm
- Length: 16 km (9.9 mi)
- Basin size: 74 km^{2} (29 sq mi)

Cabramatta Creek, an urban watercourse of the Georges River catchment, is located in the South Western Sydney, in New South Wales, Australia. The catchment area of the creek is approximately 74 square kilometres (29 sq mi), and within the catchment area are the Cabramatta Creek, Hinchinbrook Creek, Maxwells Creek, and Brickmakers Creek.

== History ==
The area around the creek was home to the Darug Aboriginal people. European settlement began on the site in the 1790s when they found good quality soil. The areas around the creek and Orphan School Creeks were favorable for growing grapevines, particularly in the moderately rich alluvial soils alongside Cabramatta Creek. In January 1797, Governor John Hunter noted that Cabramatta Creek became a series of freshwater ponds as it extended westward.

A concrete beam road bridge that carries the Hume Highway over Cabramatta Creek, constructed in 1951 and commonly known as Ireland's Bridge, is listed on the New South Wales State Heritage Register.

Throughout the 1990s to present, substantial residential development have occurred in the west of Cowpasture Road. A number of detention basins have also been constructed in conjunction with the development.

== Course ==
Cabramatta Creek flows through established residential suburbs, including Miller, Cartwright, Sadlier, Ashcroft, Liverpool, Mount Pritchard and Warwick Farm.

Cabramatta Creek rises in the rural/residential suburb of Denham Court, east south-east of Leppington, within the Liverpool local government area. From here the creek flows in a northerly direction under Camden Valley Way towards Hoxton Park, and its junction with Hinchinbrook Creek.

Below Hoxton Park Road, Cabramatta Creek starts to flow in an easterly direction the Fairfield local government area, towards its confluence with the Georges River, to the east of Warwick Farm.

== Features ==
A more prominent creek "corridor", up to 200 metres (660 ft) wide, becomes more evident throughout the lower catchment. This primarily consists of public open space, playing fields and golf courses. The Elouera Nature Reserve, which is an important pocket of native bushland, also forms part of this corridor. Located along the creek's corridor, Judah Park is a passive recreational area on Liverpool's north-western boundary, comprising an open grassed area bordered by mature trees and riparian vegetation and traversed by a shared pedestrian and cycling path. The creek corridor contains patches of the critically endangered Western Sydney Dry Rainforest and River-flat eucalypt forest.

In the area surrounding Cabramatta Creek is a large flying fox population; located behind the Sunnybrook Motel and called the Cabrammatta Creek Flying Fox Reserve. The Inghams poultry farm also occupies a significant landholding in the area. Major transport routes that cross the catchment includes Hoxton Park Road, Elizabeth Drive, Orange Grove Road (the Cumberland Highway), the Hume Highway and the Main Southern railway line.
