= Green Valley, New South Wales =

Suburb of Sydney, Australia

Green Valley
- Suburb
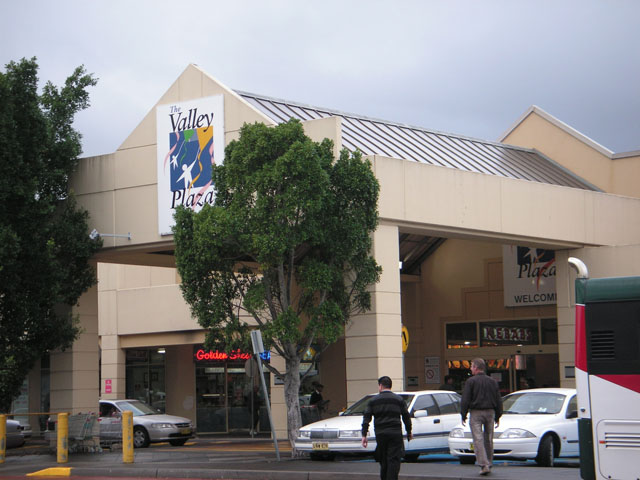
- The Valley Plaza

- Interactive map of Green Valley
- Country: Australia
- State: New South Wales
- City: Sydney
- LGA: City of Liverpool
- Location: 39 km (24 mi) W of Sydney
- Established: 1973

Government
  - State electorate: Liverpool
  - Federal division: Werriwa

Population
  - Total: 12,919 (2021 census)
- Postcode: 2168
Suburbs around Green Valley
Cecil Hills	Bonnyrigg Heights	Bonnyrigg
Cecil Park	Green Valley	Heckenberg
Middleton Grange	Hinchinbrook	Busby

Green Valley is a suburb of Sydney, in the state of New South Wales, Australia. Green Valley is located 39 kilometres (24 mi) west of the Sydney central business district, in the local government area of the City of Liverpool and is part of the Greater Western Sydney region.

== History ==
Green Valley was originally home to the Cabrogal people who spoke the Darug language. It was covered in eucalyptus forests and home to native animals such as wallabies and possums that were hunted by the Cabrogal for meat, hides and bones. When Governor Lachlan Macquarie established a town at nearby Liverpool in 1810, the surrounding areas were soon granted to British settlers who began clearing the forests for farmlands.

A large area to the northwest of Liverpool was dubbed Green Valley. As well as the present-day suburb of Green Valley, it included what is now known as Ashcroft, Busby, Cartwright, Heckenberg, Miller, Sadleir, and parts of Hinchinbrook and Mount Pritchard.

One of the first settlers in the area was Peter Miller, who gave his name to the nearby suburb of Miller. Another was Charles Scrivener who served as mayor of Liverpool and who oversaw the establishment of Green Valley School in 1882. When the first children began their classes the school was nothing more than a large tent, although a wooden building with an iron roof was constructed not long after.

By the 1960s Sydney's suburban sprawl had reached Liverpool, and the Housing Commission's development of the Green Valley Housing Estate between 1961 and 1965 was the largest single housing scheme ever attempted to that date. Within a few years 7,464 cottages, flats, and units were built, and by 1966 over 24,000 people were living in an area that had been occupied by market gardeners, dairymen, and poultry farmers a decade earlier.

It was, however, a long time before residents were provided with adequate services such as public transport, health services, shopping centres, and other necessary facilities, and before 1970 there were no pre-school centres. There was, however, a local post office, the Green Valley Post Office open from 1964 until 1973, when it was renamed Miller.

Unlike older suburbs of Sydney, where streets often run parallel in a grid pattern, Green Valley's streets follow the contours of the area, so that many streets are curved and follow an almost semi-circular pattern. Many of the streets in the suburb of Green Valley have Aboriginal names, such as Arunta, Kinkuna, and Naranghi.

== Education ==
- Busby West Public School
- Green Valley Public School
- James Busby High School
- Minarah College

== Population ==
According to the 2021 census, Green Valley had 12,919 people living within its perimeters. The median household income of $1,775 per week was on par with the national median ($1,746). Most occupied private dwellings in the suburb were standalone (82.1%) with 17.0% semi-detached or townhouses. A higher than average number of homes were being purchased (69.3%). 44.8% of people were born in Australia. The next most common countries of birth were Vietnam 9.4%, Iraq 8.8%, Fiji 4.3%, Cambodia 2.9%, and Laos 2.5%.

=== Languages ===
27.5% of people spoke only English at home. Other languages spoken at home included Vietnamese 13.9%, Arabic 10.3%, Hindi 4.8%, Assyrian Neo-Aramaic 4.6% and Spanish 3.8%.

=== Religion ===
The top responses for religious affiliation in Green Valley were Catholic 27.6%, Buddhism 16.1%, Islam 14.6%, and No Religion 12.1%.

=== Age ===
The median age of the Green Valley population was 37 years of age, with 19.4% of people being 14 years and under.

=== Employment status ===
48.7% of the people living in Green Valley who worked were employed full-time, while 26.1% were employed on a part-time basis. Green Valley had an above average unemployment rate of 7.5%.

=== Notable residents ===
Former Liverpool Mayor and local businessman, Frank Oliveri, who settled in Green Valley in the early 1950s with his family after migrating from southern Italy. Frank Oliveri and family owned the Liverpool City Raceway, local bus company (with green white and red colour livery) and was a Liverpool City Councilor for over 40 years, with two terms as mayor and three as deputy mayor. A tribute is displayed to Oliveri at the front of the Green Valley library/community centre with a photo of a young Frank at the gates of the Liverpool City Speedway (now the Valley Plaza/Library/Community Hall). Eric Hall sold the main part of his land to Frank Oliveri which became the pit area of the Liverpool City Raceway. Eric Hall also conducted a pre-recorded weekly radio show called "Happy Harmonies" on radio 2KA for 17 years during the 1960s and 1970s.
