= Male Orphan School land =

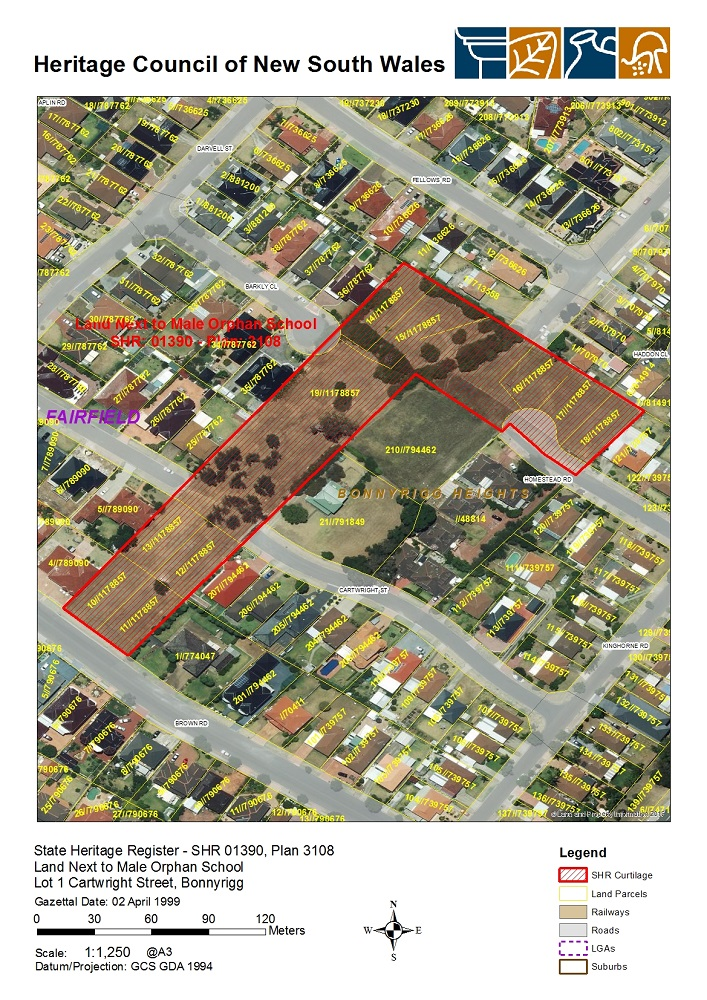
- Heritage boundaries

- Location within Sydney Location within Australia
- 33°53′28″S 150°52′42″E
- Location: Lot 1 Cartwright Street, Bonnyrigg, City of Fairfield, New South Wales, Australia

History
- Built: 1803–

Site notes
- Owner: Department of Planning and Environment

New South Wales Heritage Register
- Official name: Land Next to Male Orphan School; The Homestead; Male Schoolmaster's Residence; Bonnyrigg House; Male Orphan School land
- Type: state heritage (landscape)
- Designated: 2 April 1999
- Reference no.: 1390
- Type: Agriculture
- Category: Farming and Grazing
- Builders: James Busby

The Male Orphan School land is a heritage-listed former vineyard and orchard and now vacant land at Lot 1 Cartwright Street, Bonnyrigg, City of Fairfield, New South Wales, Australia. It was built during 1803 by James Busby. It is also known as Land Next to Male Orphan School, The Homestead, Male Schoolmaster's Residence and Bonnyrigg House. The property is owned by Department of Planning and Environment, an agency of the Government of New South Wales. It was added to the New South Wales State Heritage Register on 2 April 1999.

== History ==
The Orphan School Estate (12,300 acres/4,980 hectares) was granted in 1803 by Governor King for the support of female orphans. In 1806 tenders were called for the construction of a timber building which was used as a farmhouse until 1819 when the Male Orphan School Farm was opened by Governor Macquarie. The building was ordered by Governor Macquarie under the School and Clergy Lands Corporation Act.

A brick dormitory (attrib. to Francis Greenway, approx. 80 feet (24.5 m) by 30 feet (9.2 m)) was built at this time (later demolished leaving only the foundation). Some of the original bricks, made on the site, were later recovered and are housed at the Fairfield Council Chambers. After 1822 the Male Orphan School was moved to the southern portion of the Orphans School grant at Cabramatta. The existing homestead has been attributed to Francis Greenway, as well as Alexander Kinghorne with construction beginning in 1826 (although the Greenway connection has not been substantiated and the building has also been attributed to John Verge).

The upper storey of the residence was used as a court house for the local meeting of magistrates possibly explaining the large number of blind windows on this floor.

The first master was William Walker, followed by the Rev. Robert Cartwright, who was made Master of the School for four years. He was followed by Lieutenant Richard Sadlier, R.N., who held the position until 1851, his wife being the Rev. Cartwright's daughter. James Busby was made farm manager in 1825 and undertook pioneering work on viticulture in the grounds of the institution. The original holding was gradually broken up with the church eventually selling this portion as a farm.

In 1804 Governor King granted 12,300 acres in Cabramatta to the Female Orphan School (which had outgrown its city site on George and Bridge Streets, after lobbying from Reverend Samuel Marsden. This land was rented out in portions to provide an income for the school.

Marsden convinced King to build a permanent Female Orphan House at Parramatta (now Rydalmere), and this was built under Governor Macquarie from 1813-1818. When this opened the George Street residence was repaired and reopened as a Male Orphan House.

Commissioner Bigge was not satisfied with the city site and recommended establishment of a new male orphanage on the Orphan School estate close to Liverpool. The estate (grant) had been declared invalid due to failure of the School's Committee to pay quit rent of 12 pounds 6 shillings after 5 years. Governor Brisbane rededicated the land to its original purpose in 1823. Meanwhile the grant had been used as a small stock farm on which a small house and several farm buildings had been built.

Bigge proposed that the Male Orphan School be established on the land and that the new institution would serve as a farm school in an attempt to increase the level of farming knowledge and practice in New South Wales. It would also lower costs because the occupants could grow and harvest some of their own food.

In early 1824 the move was complete and the original George Street residence ceased operating as an orphanage. James Busby, appointed farm manager, taught viticulture to the boys and planted a vineyard here in 1825. Busby had studied viticulture in France and arrived in Sydney in 1824 (Liston, 1981). The "New Farm" near Liverpool as the male orphanage became known, briefly ceased operation in 1826.

In April 1826 the administration of orphans changed from the Orphan Committee to the Church and Schools Corporation and a new site was selected. The orphanage was again relocated, this time to a nearby site only one and 1/4 miles from Liverpool and construction of the school began at Bull's Hill, also located within the existing Orphan School estate.

The Schoolmaster's residence, otherwise known as the Homestead, was built at Bull's Hill within the Orphan School estate sometime in c.1826. The site was selected by Government engineer Alexander Kinghorne.

Work began on Bull's Farm in June 1826. The land had already been partially cleared and by July 1826 tenders were called to begin works on the Master's Residence (now Bonnyrigg House) and dormitories. Construction works on various buildings continued at the Orphanage until 1848, just two years prior to its closure in March 1850.

The large complex included the Master's House, dormitories, a dining room, school rooms, a probationary school, an infant school room and nursery, staff bedroom and kitchen, watch house, a hospital, stable and yard, coach house, offices, tailor's shop, bakehouse, storekeeper's house, clothing store and privies. Most of these were sited close to Bonnyrigg House on the top of the hill. No detailed plants were found of the institution showing their exact location.

Bonnyrigg House stood on top of a rise ("Bull's Hill") with views across the district. It was designed by Colonial Architect Francis Greenway in 1821-5. Thomas Moore was eventually engaged as its builder. A succession of Masters occupied the residence, the first being William Walker. Reverend Robert Cartwright was second master of the school for four years. Then Lieutenant Richard Sadlier (R.N.) who held the position until the school's closure. The upper floor of the residence was used as a Court House for the meeting of Magistrates.

The area covering the Orphan School estate was less densely covered by trees and was ideal for agriculture, containing excellent land for farming. Boys were employed both on the New Farm, linked to the Orphan School by a track, and in the vineyard and paddocks containing cotton crops. As identified on an 1863 survey, the paddocks and vineyard surrounded the school. The same survey shows a large garden at the front of the Master's House, though the school had closed in 1850.

The agricultural potential of the land around the homestead was recognised by James Busby, appointed Farm Manager for the orphanage in 1825. Busby was one of the first in the colony to attempt commercial grape growing for wine production, and dug a number of fresh water bores to the north east of the Master's House. Wine produced from the grapes grown on the estate was first exported from the colony in 1831. His pioneering viticulture laid the foundations of the Australian wine industry. Busby published a book on growing grapes for wine making in 1825 and also donated various (over 400) European grape varieties to the Botanic Gardens in Sydney in 1833 (which supplied a number of colonists and early viticulturists with plants for some years).

In 1850 the boys were relocated to Parramatta. For many years the buildings remained vacant, eventually falling into disrepair. At the same time the land around the complex was leased to various local families.

In the late 1870s and early 1880s the Church decided to subdivide the estate for sale. A large section of land was purchased along Orphan School Creek by William Stimson for two pounds an acre. With this acquisition William Stimson became the largest landowner and one of the most successful farmers in the Fairfield district. The pioneering Stimson family occupied Bonnyrigg House for many years.

Stimson also led the area's growing timber industry, installing steam-powered saw mills at present day King's Park and in the Fairfield township. He leased or sold large tracts of his land to his five sons who cultivated grapes and market gardens in the fertile soil along the edges of the waterway. One of these, Joseph, grew grapes in the Bonnyrigg area.

Stimson's land was again subdivided after 1912 and much of it was taken up by poultry farmers, becoming one of the state's most intensive poultry farming areas. Part of the remaining Orphan School estate was again subdivided into smaller holdings suitable for family farm allotments, particularly the case around Bonnyrigg.

A single storey front addition was added c.1914 and a timber verandah and two-storey extension were added to the rear of the building in 1914.

Photographs from c.1950 show a large bunya pine (Araucaria bidwillii) - far taller than the house, and probably dating from at least the 1870s (discovered and popularised from the 1840s onwards). Also shown in these photographs was a picket fence northwest of the house, and a star picket fence separating the vacant Orphan School site. Oleanders (Nerium oleander) had been planted by the 1950s, and remain on site today. In the 1950s the house was surrounded by vacant paddocks, market gardens and distant produce sheds.

Bonnyrigg House is the last standing structure of the colony's first orphanage for boys, which existed from 1826–1840. The Heritage Council of NSW funded an archaeological survey of the site (in 1977), which may be dedicated for an open space reserve within a residential release area, to identify historic remains of the orphanage.

The survey report traced the site's history as a sizable administrative and domestic establishment which functioned in conjunction with its agricultural estate, known as New Farm, located nearby. The orphanage, important in the development of social welfare in the country, represents one of the earliest attempts at a combined welfare and training programme. This was due to the social and educational policies of the institution's administrators.

The institution was closely associated with prominent colonial figures, in particular Rev. Samuel Marsden, Archdeacon Scott, Rev. Cartwright, Governor Lachlan Macquarie and James Busby.

Bonnyrigg House was built in 1826 as the master's residence, and the only complete example of ALexander Kinghorne's building design. Kinghorne was a civil engineer whose name has been briefly connected with colonial institutional building programmes at this time.

Examination of the site has identified structural remains and other evidence of occupation attributed to the orphanage period.

Since then many housing estates have emerged in Fairfield, particularly in the 1980s. Bonnyrigg House is now privately owned and still used as a residence.

== Description ==
The land adjoining the former Orphanage site forms part of the original curtilage of the property. It has now lost its visual association with the former superintendent's house. The site contains a very large eucalyptus, a large bunya-bunya pine (Araucaria bidwillii) as well as remnant agricultural plantings, including several fruit/citrus trees and a grape vine. There are a few remaining posts from fencing that would have once divided up the property. There is also a large oleander (Nerium oleander) hedge along the boundary separating the house from the former garden.

Dormitory Block The position of this structure has been located on land presently (1981) owned by Mr & Mrs Oliver, and is partly covered by a large shed. Scatters of brick identify the position of the brick building with stone quoins which was partly standing as recently as 1976.

Examination of the site has identified structural remains and other evidence of occupation which is attributed to the orphanage period. This includes:

- a bore, located NE of Bonnyrigg house, probably sunk by James Busby in his search for water for the institution;
- a flat raised rectangular mound located N of Bonnyrigg House. This is clearly visible in aerial photographs and may be the site of the "school" building;
- evidence of a brick path;
- an area of stone and brick paving which may relate to a dairy;
- brick clamps, visible in aerial photographs;
- considerable scatters of surface artefacts in the ploughed field immediately S of Bonnyrigg House.

=== Condition ===
As at 28 October 2003, The northern strip of the site has high archaeological potential as the original school and hospital were located there and it is likely that sub-surface remnants of these structures and associated artefacts would be located there. Site subject to theft of early bricks, and rubbish dumping.

ARCHAEOLOGICAL POTENTIAL In regard to the subject site (which forms part of land designated by Thorp 1982 as Site A, or the "primary" site) she concluded that:

- The site represents the primary area of occupation of the first male orphan school in Australia;
- It was unique in terms of its organisation and objectives until much later in the (Nineteenth) Century;
- It has close associations with some of the most prominent early figures in the ecclesiastical establishment, viz Samuel Marsden, Archdeacon Scott, Charles Cowper and the Reverend Cartwright. Lachlan Macquarie, James Busby and Alexander Kinghorne are also associated with the School; and
- It has close association(s) with our early technological, social, political, ecclesiastic, and economic history and development.

Initial work undertaken by Douglas (2004) entailed a review of available information set out in previous archaeological assessments, and in particular an examination of evidence indicating the locations of historic buildings associated with the Male Orphan School.

Douglas (2004) noted that the previous studies had been unable to locate detailed plans of the site during the period when the Male Orphan School was in operation. Douglas identified the 1863 map, prepared approximately fifteen years after closure of the Orphan School including information regarding the School buildings, features and property divisions. The 1863 plan was obtained from the State Records Office, showing scaled details of the footprint of buildings associated with the former Male Orphan School as well as a number of possible structures established at the site after c. 1850.

This information was digitised and overlaid upon a current cadastral map of the locality incorporating the site in order to determine precise locations for buildings and features associated with the Male Orphan School in relation to the current property boundary. The overlay of the 1863 and current survey plans indicates that the main buildings associated with the Male Orphan School (Bull's Hill) complex are contained wholly within a zone formed by the current study area and the grounds of Bonnyrigg House.

Physical inspection of the site did not contribute any information verifying the archaeological map for the site predicted by the review of historical sources Extensive fill has been dumped across the surface of the area in recent years, and a lush vegetation cover has developed, obscuring the ground surfaces.

Site inspection, research and mapping of the site indicate that it formerly contained five discrete localities with potential to contain historic relics that would be disturbed by development. Two of these localities are located at the south west end of the site; the other three are situated near Homestead Rd. These are described below Proposed Stage 1 Development Area (Extension of Cartwright St and subdivision and sale of four residential allotments at the South of the SHR listed precinct) Feature 1 was once occupied by a long timber structure (approx. 35m by 3.5m), constructed by 1863, possibly after the transfer of the property into private hands, and which is of unidentified function. The structure is located along the eastern boundary of the proposed Lot 12. Feature 2 consists of the site once occupied by the Orphan School Dormitory Block. This was a brick structure, 4m x 17m on plan, currently located within the area of the proposed Cartwright St extension. It may extend slightly to the south into Lots 12 and 13. Proposed Stage 2 Development Area (Extension of Homestead Drive and subdivision and sale of six residential allotments to the north of the SHR listed precinct including the NE corner of Lot 210 included in the SHR listed precinct for Bonnyrigg House) Feature 3 consists of the former Male Orphan School Hospital site. This building was a timber structure, 4m x 17m on plan, with a centrally located brick fireplace. It was enclosed by a timber fence. The indicative location of this site is within proposed allotments 15 and 16.

Feature 4 is the site of the former Male Orphan School Storekeeper's Quarters. It was a brick structure, 4m x 17m on plan. Its indicative location is within the area of the proposed Barkly Close-Homestead Rd extension, but it may lie partly north of this area, within proposed allotments 14 and 15.

Feature 5 is the indicative site of the Male Orphan School Dam. Its dimensions look to have been 5m x 20m on plan. It may have been partially filled in the east before the 1940s. This feature is said to have stone-lined drains that connected it with the surrounding building complex. Aerial photographs and early historic plans of the site suggest that the dam is located partly within the proposed Public Reserve and partly within Lot 17.

The overall setting of the house and curtilage has been severely compromised due to suburban housing development, poorly sited and designed. The house in itself has been compromised with unsympathetic alterations and additions.

=== Modifications and dates ===
Not known. 10/03 mature Monterey pine removed (Pinus radiata) – Council approval of DA, no s.60

=== Further information ===
The house and the wider site area associated with the house should be integrated and interpreted to allow those who live in the area and those who might visit the site to be able to understand the house and its setting prior to its enclosure by mass market housing. The remnant plantings should be conserved, and any remaining structures or features protected.

== Heritage listing ==
As at 5 May 1999, The site has high social and historical significance as the site of an early nineteenth century Male Orphanage and School and was one of few such institutions to be established at this time. It was the second such orphanage to be established in the colony, the associated Female orphanage being the first. The land adjoining the former orphanage is also of high significance for its use for pioneering work in viticulture by James Busby and early orcharding uses. The land (along with adjoining Bonnyrigg House - the former School Master's residence (a separate SHR item)) is all that remains of the once extensive grounds which were worked by the boys of the orphanage as a form of rehabilitation.

The site has associations with James Busby and the development of the Australian wine industry. Busby was appointed to teach viticulture to boys at the Orphan School in 1825 and planted a vineyard here in 1825. While not the first to import or grow vines, Busby was the prophet of the Australian wine industry, publishing the first book (1825, Sydney) in Australia on wine growing and making, donating a huge private collection of European grape varieties to the Botanic Gardens, Sydney in 1833 (which was thence distributed across the state, to SA and Victoria), and responsible for the first plantings in the Hunter Valley in 1825. Wine from the Orphan School estate was exported receiving favourable mention in England in 1831. and Ramsden, E. James Busby, Prophet of Australian Viticulture, 1941)

The area has historic and archaeological significance as the primary site of the first Male Orphan School in Australia from 1826-1840, during which time it was a sizable administrative and domestic establishment which functioned in conjunction with its agricultural estate, known as New Farm, located nearby.

The orphanage, important in the development of social welfare in Australia, represents one of the earliest attempts at a combined welfare and training programme, due to the social and educational policies of the institution's administrators.

The institution was closely associated with prominent colonial figures, including Samuel Marsden, Archdeacon Scott, Reverend Cartwright, Governor Macquarie and James Busby.

The site has identified structural remains and other evidence of occupation which is attributed to the orphanage period. It has potential archaeological significance, with potential to provide information on the functions, layout and activities of the orphanage and its growth and decline.

ARCHAEOLOGICAL REMAINS The Male Orphan School site has the potential to provide physical evidence relating to the welfare, training and education of destitute and under-privileged male children in this period. The archaeological remains of the site represent the most complete record available of the style and distribution of buildings and amenities made available to the boys housed at the school. This evidence has a potential to provide a voice to the otherwise silent orphans and to reveal their experiences within the institution. The material culture of the site can help to reveal the processes of the institution, revealing a complex combination of purpose, intention, belief and action that is not necessarily discernible in the historical record.

The archaeological resource also has the potential to address broader research questions relating to such issues as social welfare policy, institutional practices, health and education. In addition, this physical evidence has high comparative value in relation to the Rydalmere Female Orphan site, in terms of investigating differences in gender roles, perceptions and expectations in the early colonial period.

Land Next to Male Orphan School was listed on the New South Wales State Heritage Register on 2 April 1999 having satisfied the following criteria.

The place is important in demonstrating the course, or pattern, of cultural or natural history in New South Wales.

The site has historical significance for the experimental agricultural work which was undertaken by the boys of the Orphan School with the help of assigned labour. The establishment of vineyards and cotton crops on the farm were amongst the earliest of their kind and the diversity of crops and flocks were unusual for the period.

The place is important in demonstrating aesthetic characteristics and/or a high degree of creative or technical achievement in New South Wales.

The site has aesthetic significance as an important remnant of early agricultural attempts in the district. It provides an important visual context for the former Orphan School and allows interpretation of its former setting and function. The site has further significance as an essential visual break in the monotony of the surrounding urban development which no longer allows interpretation of the cultural and historic landscape.

The place has a strong or special association with a particular community or cultural group in New South Wales for social, cultural or spiritual reasons.

The Homestead along with the adjoining land is of high social significance as one of very few sites of its type established in the early part of the nineteenth century. It is of particular value for its demonstration of early and mid-Victorian attitudes to social welfare. The site has further significance as one of the earliest examples of the "self help" doctrine through the provision of training courses in trades for the boys housed there as evidenced by their work on the orchards, vineyards and cotton crops established on the site.

The place has potential to yield information that will contribute to an understanding of the cultural or natural history of New South Wales.

The site has technical/research significance through its association with early viticulture and cotton cropping techniques and other associated pastoral activities, undertaken at a time when such diversity of cropping was extremely unusual. The site allows investigation into Colonial farming practices and attitudes to social welfare at the time.

The place possesses uncommon, rare or endangered aspects of the cultural or natural history of New South Wales.

A rare example of the grounds associated with a Colonial homestead that was itself associated with a social welfare institution.

The place is important in demonstrating the principal characteristics of a class of cultural or natural places/environments in New South Wales.

The site is representative of the early attempts to develop a social welfare system utilising the "self-help" doctrine and demonstrates the implementation of this approach.
