= Bonnyrigg, New South Wales =

Bonnyrigg
- Suburb
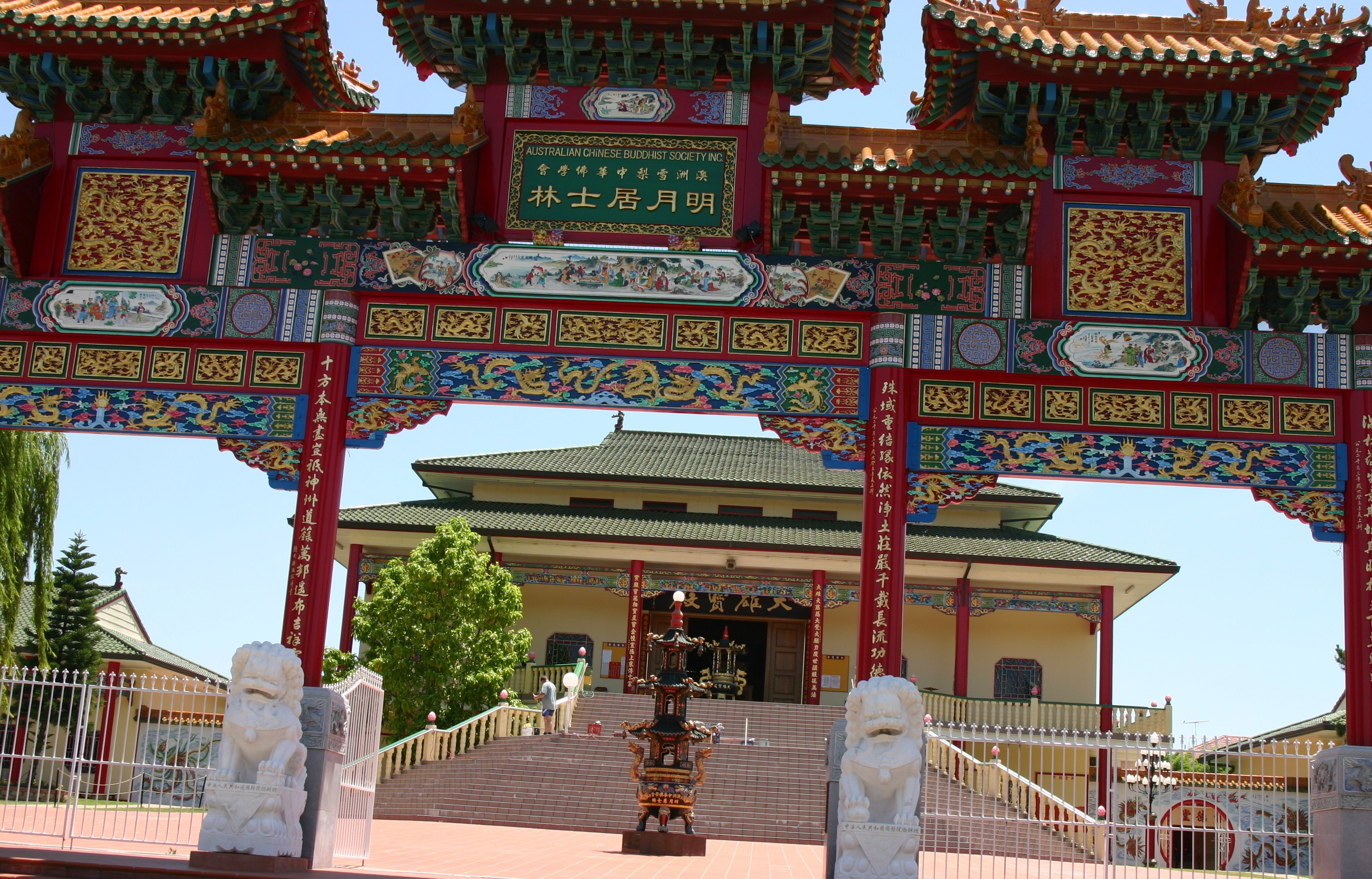
- The Ming Yue Lay Buddhist Temple located on Humphries Road

- Interactive map of Bonnyrigg
- Country: Australia
- State: New South Wales
- City: Sydney
- LGA: City of Fairfield
- Location: 36 km (22 mi) west of Sydney CBD

Government
  - State electorates: Cabramatta; Liverpool
  - Federal divisions: Fowler; Werriwa

Area
  - Total: 3 km^{2} (1.2 sq mi)
- Elevation: 48 m (157 ft)

Population
  - Total: 9,785 (2021 census)
  - Density: 3,300/km^{2} (8,400/sq mi)
- Postcode: 2177
Suburbs around Bonnyrigg
Edensor Park	St Johns Park	Cabramatta West
Bonnyrigg Heights	Bonnyrigg	Mount Pritchard
Green Valley	Heckenberg	Heckenberg

Bonnyrigg is a suburb of Sydney, in the state of New South Wales, Australia 36 kilometres west of the Sydney central business district, in the local government area of the City of Fairfield. It is part of the Greater Western Sydney region.

== History ==
Bonnyrigg takes its name from Bonnyrigg, Midlothian, Scotland. In 1803, Governor King Arthur Philip granted land for the building of an orphanage. A two-storey Georgian house was erected in Brown Road and became the Male Orphan Schoolchildren's Residence. It was extended around 1914 and is now listed on the Register of the National Estate. On 14 December 2025, Bonnyrigg gained national attention when it was revealed that two of the shooters in the Bondi terrorist attack were from the suburb.

== Heritage listings ==
Bonnyrigg has a number of heritage-listed sites, including:

- Cartwright Street: Bonnyrigg House
- Lot 1 Cartwright Street: Male Orphan School land

== Geography ==
Bonnyrigg lies approximately 30 kilometres west of Sydney's central business district as the crow flies and about 36 kilometres by road. Its closest major regional centre is Liverpool. The suburb is shaped like a diamond. The suburbs of Mount Pritchard and Cabramatta West lie to the east on the other side of Green Valley Creek. St Johns Park, Greenfield Park and Edensor Park lie to the north. Bonnyrigg Heights, Hinchinbrook and Green Valley are to the west. Busby and Heckenberg lie to the south.

Currently the town centre is undergoing a major regeneration through a new housing scheme – Newleaf Bonnyrigg. This will replace over 800 dwellings with 2,330 new homes that will see the town's population increase by over 3,000 people over 12 years to 2022. The project is being delivered through a Public Private Partnership with Housing New South Wales called Newleaf.

== Commercial area ==
Bonnyrigg's commercial area consists of a main hub around Bonnyrigg Plaza, a shopping centre located on Bonnyrigg Avenue. Bonnyrigg Plaza has undergone major renovation allowing new stores and a fresh new food court to come in. This commercial area also has several community facilities such as a PCYC, an office of the Housing NSW department and a public library. A Bunnings hardware store is located opposite to the plaza and the local primary school is adjacent to Bonnyrigg Plaza.

Brown Road in Bonnyrigg is also a commercial area, albeit smaller. It contains several mixed business Asian stores, a Vietnamese and Chinese restaurant and take away, newsagency and Liberty petrol station.

== Transport ==
The closest railway station is Cabramatta, which is serviced by the Cumberland Line, Leppington & Inner West Line and Liverpool & Inner West Line. There are bus links to Cabramatta station and other nearby stations.

Bonnyrigg is served by several bus routes operated by Transit Systems. The Liverpool to Parramatta T-way transitway service, the T80, operates via Bonnyrigg, stopping near Bonnyrigg Plaza.

== Demographics ==
According to the 2021 census of population, there were 9,785 residents in Bonnyrigg. 23.5% of people spoke only English at home. Other languages spoken at home included Vietnamese 27.4%, Arabic 6.4%, Khmer 5.6%, Assyrian Neo-Aramaic 4.9% and Cantonese 3.4%.

The most common ancestries in Bonnyrigg were Vietnamese 26.6%, Chinese 13.8%, Australian 9.0%, Khmer (Cambodian) 7.4% and English 6.8%.

40.8% of people were born in Australia. The next most common countries of birth were Vietnam 19.5%, Iraq 7.4%, Cambodia 5.1%, Laos 2.5% and China (excluding Hong Kong, Macau and Taiwan) 1.8%.

The most common responses for religion were Buddhism 28.2%, Catholic 23.6%, No Religion 17.0% and Islam 4.7%.

== Education ==
- Bonnyrigg High School
- Bonnyrigg Public School
- Our Lady of Mt Carmel Parish School
- Bonnyrigg Heights Public School

== Culture and recreation ==
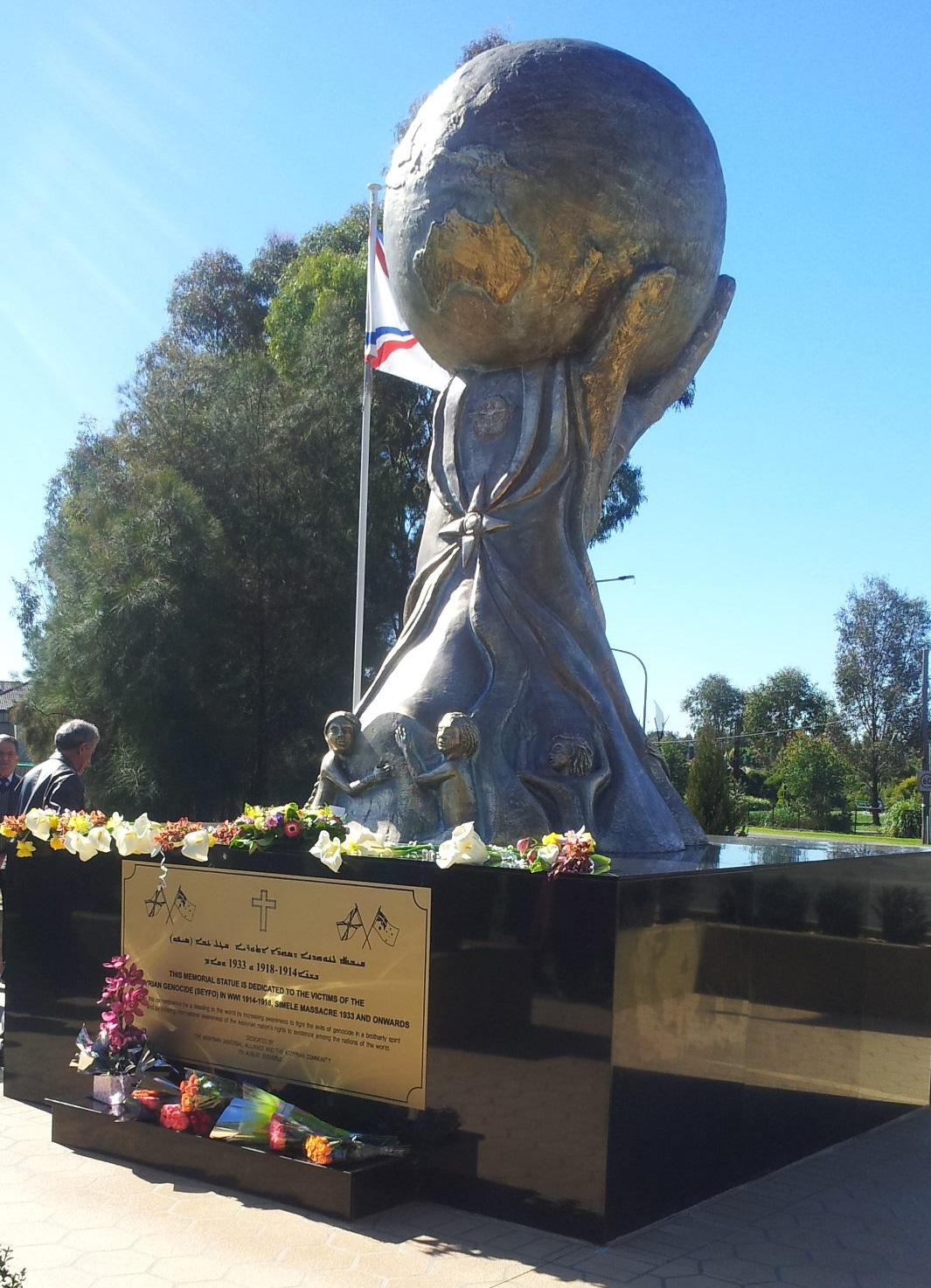
Erected in August 2010, the Assyrian genocide monument serves as a memorial to the Assyrian community.

Bonnyrigg is home to the New South Wales Premier League soccer club Bonnyrigg White Eagles Football Club. Bonnyrigg is also home to the Nineveh Soccer Stadium, home of the Fairfield Bulls football club. On the southern border of Edensor Park adjoining Bonnyrigg, Tyari Reserve is a landscaped open space reserve featuring a gently sloping grassed area bordered by dense stands of mature trees and native vegetation.

In 2009, Fairfield City Council unanimously approved the construction of an Assyrian genocide memorial, commemorating the deaths of Assyrians during and after the First World War. The decision attracted international controversy, with the Turkish government opposing the monument and threatening legal action, while Australian Foreign Minister Stephen Smith unsuccessfully urged the council to reconsider the proposal over concerns about Australia's relations with Turkey. A petition opposing the monument was also submitted by members of Sydney's Turkish community. In April 2015, the Assyrian genocide memorial was vandalised with swastikas and graffiti targeting Jewish, Armenian and Assyrian communities. It was the third reported attack on the monument since its erection in 2010. The vandalism occurred shortly before the centenary of the killings and amid renewed international debate over recognition of the Assyrian genocide.
