= Freeman Catholic College =

Location
- Mount Street, Bonnyrigg Heights, New South Wales; Australia; 33°53′12.50″S 150°51′53.3″E

Information
- Type: Catholic co-educational secondary day school
- Motto: "To proclaim the good news"
- Denomination: Roman Catholic
- Established: 1985; 41 years ago
- Principal: Melinda Melham, Andrew Laming (assistant)
- Staff: 107
- Enrolment: 1,360
- Colours: Red, white and blue
- Website: freemanbonnyrigg.syd.catholic.edu.au

Freeman Catholic College is a Catholic Roman Catholic co-educational secondary school located in Bonnyrigg Heights, a western suburb of Sydney, New South Wales, Australia.

The school was founded in 1985 and named after Cardinal Sir James Freeman, the sixth Roman Catholic Archbishop of Sydney. With a teaching staff of 107, in April 2024, the college reports enrolment of approximately 1,360 students, with a student:teacher ratio 13:1.

== Notable people ==
In 2010, Guy Zangari, who was the school's Pastoral Care Coordinator, was selected as the Australian Labor Party candidate for the state electorate of Fairfield for the New South Wales State elections in March 2011 as Joe Tripodi's replacement who had recently resigned.

== See also ==
- List of Catholic schools in New South Wales
- Catholic education in Australia
