= Heckenberg =

- Suburb
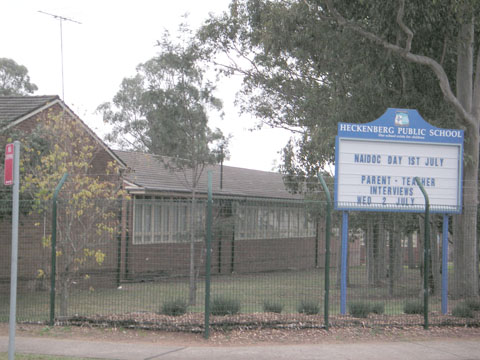
- Heckenberg Public School in 2009

- Interactive map of Heckenberg
- Country: Australia
- State: New South Wales
- City: Sydney
- LGA: City of Liverpool
- Location: 36 km (22 mi) west of Sydney CBD

Government
  - State electorate: Liverpool
  - Federal division: Werriwa
- Elevation: 56 m (184 ft)

Population
  - Total: 3,263 (2021 census)
- Postcode: 2168
Suburbs around Heckenberg
Green Valley	Bonnyrigg	Mount Pritchard
Busby	Heckenberg	Mount Pritchard
Busby	Sadleir	Ashcroft

Heckenberg is a suburb in south-western Sydney, in the state of New South Wales, Australia 36 kilometres west of the Sydney central business district, in the local government area of the City of Liverpool.

== History ==
Heckenberg was named after a pioneering family who settled on land in the area before 1840. Casper Theodore Heckenberg was born in Plymouth, England in 1810 to parents Harriet and Henry, who later moved to Hull. Casper was a master mariner and operated ships between Sydney and Port Stephens in the logging trade. The family bought land in the Liverpool area and some of the Heckenberg sons became well known woodchoppers. James William Heckenberg was the Australasian Woodchopping Champion at the turn of the century. There were eight brothers and one sister in the Heckenberg family. Heckenberg was part of the Green Valley housing estate, which was subdivided in 1960.

Heckenberg Post Office opened on 1 July 1965 and closed in 1986.

== Education ==
- Heckenberg Public School

== Population ==
According to the 2021 census, Heckenberg had a population of 3,263 whose median age of 32 was substantially younger than the national median of 38. It is a low-income area with the median household income ($1,159 per week) significantly lower than the national median ($1,746). Aboriginal and Torres Strait Islander people made up 4.0% of the population. 52.6% of people in the suburb were born in Australia. The next most common countries of birth were Vietnam 11.1%, Lebanon 5.0% and Iraq 4.2%. 33.9% of people spoke only English at home. Other languages spoken at home included Arabic 20.7% and Vietnamese 15.9%. The most common responses for religion were Islam 23.6%, No Religion 18.8%, Catholic 16.7% and Buddhism 13.3%.
