= Bonnyrigg Heights =

- Suburb
- Interactive map of Bonnyrigg Heights
- Country: Australia
- State: New South Wales
- City: Sydney
- LGA: City of Fairfield
- Location: 37 km (23 mi) west of Sydney CBD

Government
  - State electorate: Liverpool
  - Federal division: Werriwa
- Elevation: 60 m (200 ft)

Population
  - Total: 7,369 (2021 census)
- Postcode: 2177
Suburbs around Bonnyrigg Heights
Abbotsbury	Edensor Park	Bonnyrigg
Cecil Hills	Bonnyrigg Heights	Bossley Park
Cecil Hills	Green Valley	Green Valley

Bonnyrigg Heights is a suburb of Sydney, in New South Wales, Australia. Its name originates from Bonnyrigg, Midlothian, Scotland. Bonnyrigg Heights is located on the traditional indigenous lands of the Dharug Nation.

== Geography ==
The elevation of Bonnyrigg Heights is between 42 and 90 metres above mean sea level. Located 37 kilometres west of the Sydney central business district, it is in the local government area of the City of Fairfield and is part of the Greater Western Sydney region.

== Demographics ==
According to the 2021 census, there were 7,369 residents in Bonnyrigg Heights. In Bonnyrigg Heights, 44.0% of people were Australian-born. The most common other countries of birth were Vietnam 12.4%, Iraq 9.4%, Cambodia 3.8%, Laos 2.2% and Fiji 2.2%. 26.2% of people spoke only English at home. Other languages spoken at home included Vietnamese 17.9%, Arabic 6.5%, Assyrian Neo-Aramaic 5.9%, Serbian 5.8% and Khmer 4.1%. The most common responses for religion in Bonnyrigg Heights were Catholic 31.3%, Buddhism 21.3%, No Religion 12.1%, Eastern Orthodox 8.0% and Islam 6.9%.

== Transport ==
Buses operated by Transit Systems traverse the suburb. The T80 Liverpool-Parramatta Transitway links Bonnyrigg Heights to major centres across Greater Western Sydney including Bonnyrigg, Prairiewood, Smithfield, City of Liverpool and City of Parramatta as well as Green Valley and Cecil Hills. Other routes all operating every 30 minutes are:

- Route 805 Bonnyrigg Heights to Liverpool and Cabramatta.
- Route 806 Liverpool to Parramatta via Bonnyrigg.
- Route 807 Cabramatta to Cecil Hills via Bonnyrigg.

== Schools ==
This suburb is home to Freeman Catholic College, a secondary school, and an adjacent public school called Bonnyrigg Heights Primary School. The suburb also contains John the Baptist Primary School, located next to Freeman Catholic College.

== Infrastructure ==
Bonnyrigg Heights Fire Station, operated by Fire and Rescue NSW, services the local area.

Bonnyrigg Heights Hall is the local community facility that can be reserved through local council for functions, meetings and celebrations.

Bonnyrigg Heights is well equipped with parks, including a dog park, and walking tracks for locals to use at their pleasure.
