= Electoral district of Liverpool =

Liverpool New South Wales—Legislative Assembly
- Interactive map of district boundaries from the 2023 state election
- State: New South Wales
- Dates current: 1950–present
- MP: Charishma Kaliyanda
- Party: Labor
- Namesake: Liverpool
- Electors: 60,875 (2024)
- Area: 31.7318 km^{2} (12.3 sq mi)
- Demographic: Outer-metropolitan
Electorates around Liverpool:
Badgerys Creek	Cabramatta	Cabramatta
Leppington	Liverpool	Holsworthy
Leppington	Holsworthy	Holsworthy

Liverpool is an electoral district of the Legislative Assembly of the Australian state of New South Wales in Sydney's West. It is currently represented by Charishma Kaliyanda of the Labor Party.

The district is located in Western Sydney covering parts of Liverpool City Council and Fairfield City Council.

== Geography ==
On its current boundaries, Liverpool takes in the suburbs of Ashcroft, Bonnyrigg, Bonnyrigg Heights, Busby, Cartwright, Cecil Hills, Elizabeth Hills, Green Valley, Heckenberg, Hinchinbrook, Hoxton Park, Len Waters Estate, Liverpool, Miller, Mount Pritchard, Sadleir and Warwick Farm.

== History ==
Liverpool was created in 1950 and has since always been represented by a member of the Labor Party. It has historically been one of the safest Labor seats in New South Wales and is considered a part of Labor's heartland in Western Sydney. To the testament of how safe this seat is, at the 2011 election it became the safest ALP seat with sitting member Paul Lynch winning 64.7% of the two party preferred vote. As virtually all other ALP MPs were reduced to margins less than 55%. Though Ron Hoenig won a larger vote at the Heffron by-election held in August 2012 but that was achieved in the absence of a Liberal opponent.

== Members for Liverpool ==
Member	Party	Term
James McGirr	Labor	1950–1952
Jack Mannix	Labor	1952–1971
George Paciullo	Labor	1971–1989
Peter Anderson	Labor	1989–1995
Paul Lynch	Labor	1995–2023
Charishma Kaliyanda	Labor	2023–present

== Election results ==
2023 New South Wales state election: Liverpool
Party	Candidate	Votes	%	±%
Labor	Charishma Kaliyanda	22,681	47.2	−7.9
Liberal	Richard Ammoun	16,409	34.1	+7.8
Independent	Michael Andjelkovic	3,508	7.3	+7.3
Greens	Amy Croft	3,039	6.3	+0.9
Animal Justice	Gabriel Hancock	1,446	3.0	+3.0
	Linda Harris	982	2.0	+2.0
Total formal votes		48,065	94.0	−0.8
Informal votes		3,047	6.0	+0.8
Turnout		51,112	84.4	−1.4
Two-party-preferred result
Labor	Charishma Kaliyanda	24,913	58.3	−9.0
Liberal	Richard Ammoun	17,783	41.7	+9.0
Labor hold		Swing	−9.0	
