= Mount Pritchard Oval =

Park in Mount Pritchard, New South Wales

- Interactive map of Mount Pritchard Oval
- Nearest city: Sydney
- Coordinates: 33°53′42″S 150°53′55″E
- Operator: Mounties

Mt. Pritchard Oval is a park in Mount Pritchard, New South Wales. It is the home ground for the Mount Pritchard Mounties. The oval is only used in rugby league matches for the NSW Cup.
