= Fairfield City Council =

- Local government area
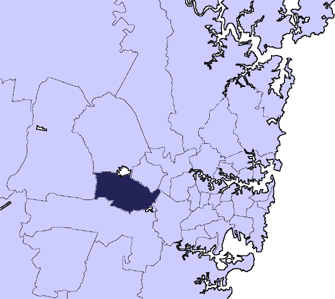
- Location in Metropolitan Sydney

- Interactive map of Fairfield City Council
- Coordinates: 33°52′S 150°55′E
- Country: Australia
- State: New South Wales
- Region: Greater Western Sydney
- Established: 8 December 1888 (Smithfield and Fairfield); 26 October 1920 (Fairfield)
- Council seat: Wakeley

Government
  - Mayor: Frank Carbone (Dai Le and Frank Carbone Network)
  - State electorates: Badgerys Creek; Cabramatta; Fairfield; Liverpool; Prospect
  - Federal divisions: Fowler; McMahon; Werriwa

Area
  - Total: 102 km^{2} (39 sq mi)

Population
  - Total: 208,475 (LGA 2021) (20th)
- Time zone: UTC+10 (AEST)
  - Summer (DST): UTC+11 (AEDT)
- Website: Fairfield City Council
LGAs around Fairfield City Council
Penrith	Blacktown	Cumberland
Penrith	Fairfield City Council	Canterbury-Bankstown
Liverpool	Liverpool	Liverpool

The Fairfield City Council is a local government area in the west of Sydney, in the state of New South Wales, Australia. The council was first incorporated as the "Municipal District of Smithfield and Fairfield" on 8 December 1888, and the council's name was changed to the "Municipality of Fairfield" in 1920, before being proclaimed a city in 1979. The City of Fairfield comprises an area of 102 square kilometres (39 sq mi) and as of the 2021 census had a population of 208,475. The mayor of the City of Fairfield is Frank Carbone, the first popularly-elected independent mayor of Fairfield.

Fairfield is considered one of the most ethnically diverse suburbs in Australia. At the 2021 census, the proportion of residents in the Fairfield local government area who stated their ancestry as Vietnamese and Assyrian, was in excess of sixteen times the national average. The area was linguistically diverse, with Vietnamese, Arabic, Assyrian Neo-Aramaic, or Cantonese languages spoken in households, and ranged from two times to seventeen times the national averages.

The Smithfield–Wetherill Park Industrial Estate is the largest industrial estate in the Southern Hemisphere and is the centre of manufacturing and distribution in Greater Western Sydney, with more than 1,000 manufacturing, wholesale, transport and service firms.

== History ==
For more than 30,000 years, Aboriginal people from the Cabrogal–Gandangara tribe have lived in the area.

=== 1850s–1920s ===
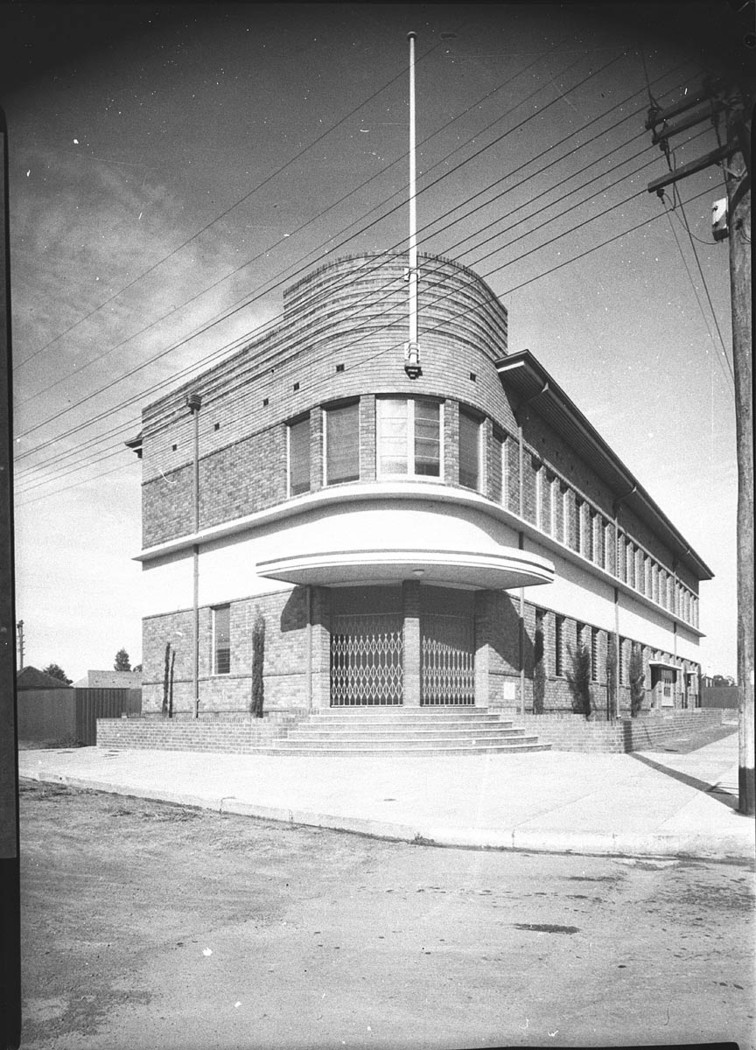
Cabramatta Civic Hall, 1944

European settlement began early in the 19th century and was supported by railway construction in 1856. One of Sydney's oldest trees, the Bland Oak, was planted in the 1830s in Carramar. At the turn of the 20th century the area had a population of 2,500 people and with fertile soils, produced crops for distribution in Sydney. The council was first incorporated as the Municipal District of Smithfield and Fairfield on 8 December 1888, becoming the Municipality of Smithfield and Fairfield from 1906. In December 1901, a major bushfire emerged from what is now Fairfield Heights through to the railway line at Canley Vale, where it destroyed many houses in its path as its crossed creeks, and also annihilated acres of vines and orchards between St Johns Park and Fairfield. On 26 October 1920, the council's name was changed to the Municipality of Fairfield, in recognition of the changing centre of business in the council area.

=== 1940s–1980s ===
Although Fairfield itself experienced little direct military activity during the Second World War, the surrounding district contained several military installations. Troops guarded the Upper Canal water supply at Prospect, while a remount depot for horses was established on Wallgrove Road. Following the Japanese midget submarine attack on Sydney Harbour in May 1942, the Royal Australian Navy dispersed part of its fleet, stationing a flotilla of small boats at popular swimming areas on Prospect Creek, with their crews accommodated in a houseboat at Latty's Pleasure Grounds.

The Cabramatta Civic Hall, completed in 1944 to a design by J. A. Dobson, was the Cabramatta and Canley Vale seat from 1944 to 1948 and the Fairfield Council seat from 1949. Rapid population increase after World War II saw the settlement of many ex-service men and European migrants. Large scale Housing Commission development in the 1950s swelled the population to 38,000. From 1 January 1949, under the Local Government (Areas) Act 1948, the 'Municipality of Cabramatta and Canley Vale' was amalgamated into the Municipality of Fairfield. In 1964, the Australian Oil and Gas Corporation drilled the Fairfield-1 exploratory well in Wakeley's Esperance Reserve, as part of petroleum exploration of the Sydney Basin. The well was located at a ground elevation of 22.3 m (73 ft), and reached a total depth of 855.3 m (2,806 ft) below ground level.

In the 1976 census, the population had reached 114,000 and was becoming one of the larger local government areas in New South Wales. On 18 May 1979, the Municipality of Fairfield was granted city status, becoming the City of Fairfield. In 1984, the Council established Fairfield City Farm (later renamed Calmsley Hill City Farm), which operated educational programs for schools and visitors.

=== 2000s–present ===
On Friday 29 June 2001 the former deputy mayor of Fairfield and councillor from 1987 to 1998, Phuong Ngo, was convicted of the 1994 murder of the local state MP for Cabramatta (and former deputy mayor), John Newman, a crime which has been described as Australia's first political assassination. Ngo's alleged accomplices, Quang Dao and David Dinh, were acquitted and the identity of the killer who shot and fatally wounded Newman remains a mystery. Controversy has arisen in the years since then of the presence of Ngo's name on various council plaques from his time on council.

In September 2006, Fairfield Council announced the introduction of a trial ban on spitting in public on public health grounds. However, it was reported that advice provided to council from NSW Health was that spitting does not impact on the transmission of infectious diseases. The law proved difficult to prosecute. In 2010, Fairfield City Council proposed establishing a new locality within Smithfield named Brenan Heights, centred on Brenan Park. The proposal was put to residents and property owners by ballot, but failed to gain sufficient community support, with most preferring to retain the historic Smithfield name.

In April 2024, the first terrorist attack in Western Sydney occurred at a church in Wakeley, where an alleged Islamic extremist stabbed bishop Mar Mari Emmanuel and five other people. All six survived the attack. In 2024, Following the decision by Woolworths, Big W and Aldi not to stock extra items for Australia Day, Fairfield City Council resolved to provide free Australia Day merchandise to residents.

== Geography ==
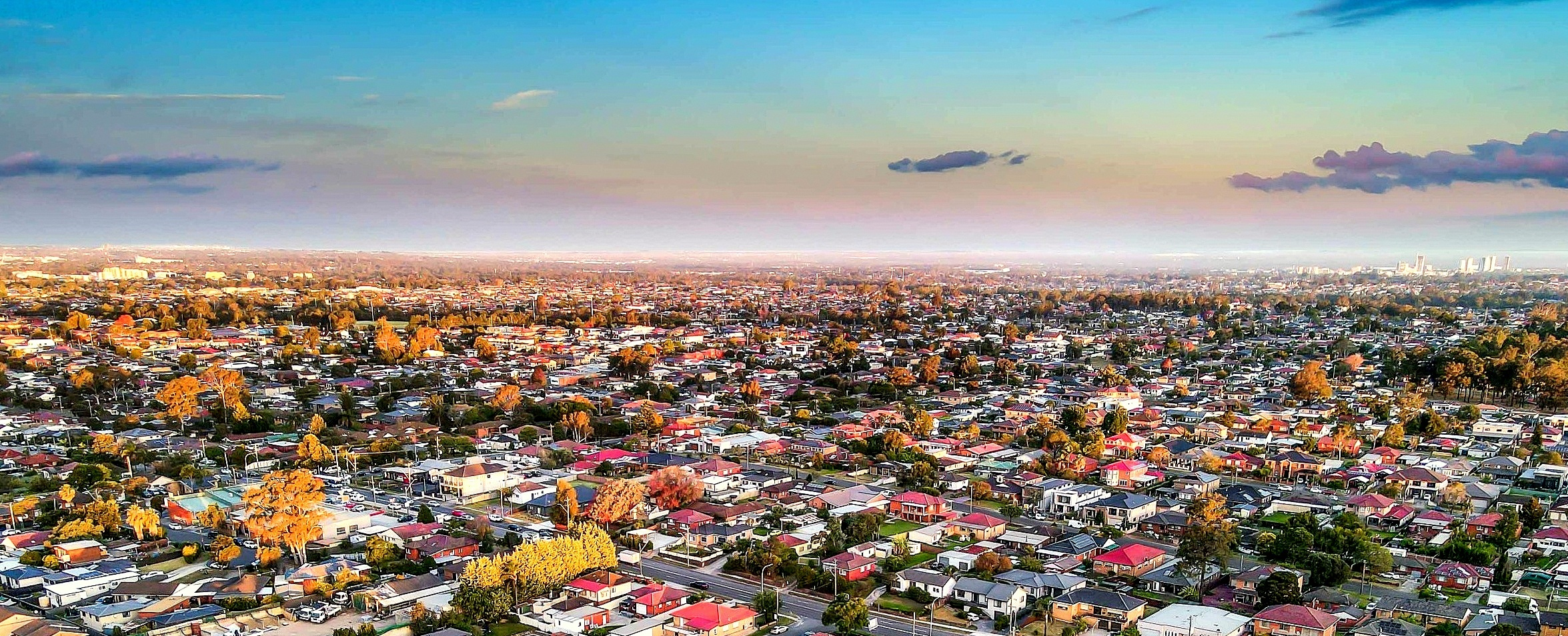
Fairfield CBD on the far left, with Smithfield in the foreground

A few small areas of the original bushland remain, including examples of Cumberland Plain Woodland, which is listed under the Threatened Species Conservation Act, and the Cooks River/Castlereagh Ironbark ecological community. There are 580 parks (60 of which are major parks), including one of the largest urban parks in the world, Western Sydney Parklands, which has a precinct that lies in the Fairfield area, called the Western Sydney Regional Park. Fairfield City Council has constructed flood detention basins that temporarily store excess stormwater during flood events, helping to protect downstream properties before gradually releasing the water. Some of these basins also serve as parks and sporting fields during dry conditions, allowing them to provide flood protection while retaining recreational uses.

Creeks flowing in the area include Prospect Creek, Cabramatta Creek, Clear Paddock Creek and Green Valley Creek. The creeks streamed through what the settlers described as "a chain of ponds" down to the Georges River, rather than an unbroken stream, before the disturbance of the banks by the European settlers. De Freitas Wetland was one of the many ponds of Prospect Creek. On a map today, the creeks resemble three fingers creeping out westward from the river. Fairfield City is mainly residential in nature with large-scale industrial estates at Wetherill Park and Smithfield. Fairfield Showground is an important cultural venue. Prominent roads such as Cumberland Highway and The Horsley Drive wind through it. Wetherill Park is listed as one of the five most leafiest suburbs in Sydney by the Domain Group, being the only suburb in Western Sydney to be listed (since most leafy suburbs are within Northern Sydney).

Geologically, much of the City of Fairfield lies within the Fairfield Basin, a broad synclinal structure forming part of the Cumberland Basin within the larger Sydney Basin. The basin, which takes its name from Fairfield, preserves substantial thicknesses of the Wianamatta Group, whose Triassic shale and sandstone formations underlie much of the local government area. Weathering of these rocks has contributed to the gently undulating, clay-rich landscape characteristic of the Cumberland Plain.

=== Suburbs ===
Suburbs in the City of Fairfield are:

- Abbotsbury
- Bonnyrigg
- Bonnyrigg Heights
- Bossley Park
- Cabramatta
- Cabramatta West
- Canley Heights
- Canley Vale
- Carramar
- Cecil Park (shared with the City of Liverpool)
- Edensor Park
- Fairfield (with a small part in Cumberland Council)
- Fairfield East
- Fairfield Heights
- Fairfield West
- Greenfield Park
- Horsley Park
- Lansvale
- Mount Pritchard (with a small part in City of Liverpool)
- Old Guildford
- Prairiewood
- Smithfield (shared with Cumberland Council)
  - Smithfield West (locality in Smithfield)
- St Johns Park
- Wakeley
- Wetherill Park
- Yennora (shared with Cumberland Council)

== Urban tree canopy and greening ==
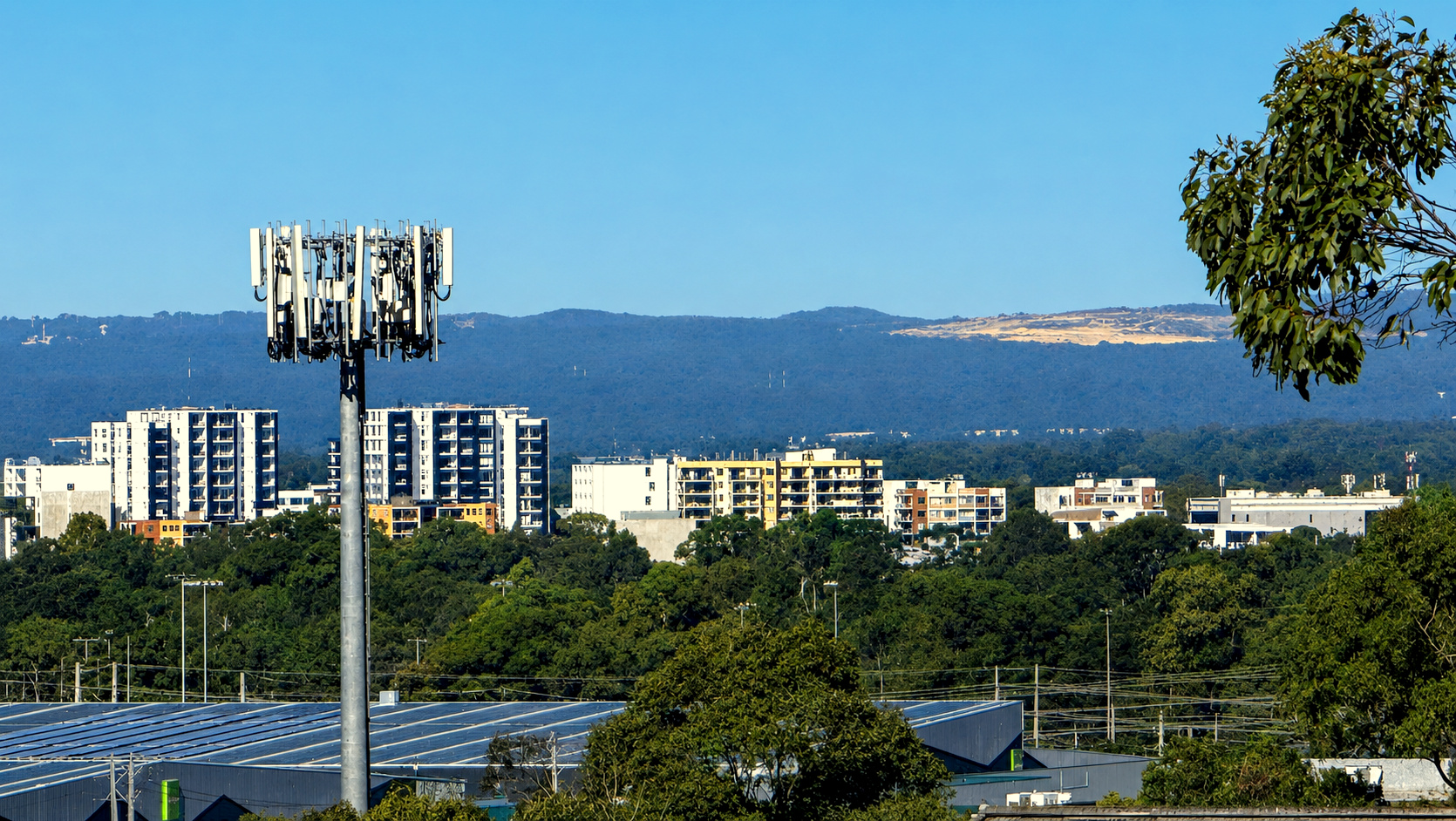
The Fairfield CBD skyline and surrounding urban tree canopy, viewed from Greystanes.

According to an assessment of urban tree canopy cover, Fairfield LGA has a total urban tree canopy cover of 10.5%. Research has found that residents living in urban areas with at least 30% tree canopy cover may experience improved mental and physical health outcomes. In Fairfield, approximately 13% of residents live in areas where tree canopy cover exceeds 30%. As in Greater Sydney, residential, commercial and industrial properties comprise the majority of Fairfield's urban land and contain the largest share of its tree canopy, accounting for 46% of total canopy cover. However, both private properties and streets have relatively low canopy cover compared with their land area, indicating potential opportunities for increased urban greening. Streets account for 19% of Fairfield's urban area and have a tree canopy cover of 8%. Parks comprise 13% of the urban area and have a canopy cover of 32%, while properties make up 68% of the urban area and have a canopy cover of 7%.

Within the Fairfield City Council area, tree canopy covered 15.29% (15.54 km²) of public and private land, while the Council's approximately 2,000 road reserves (Note: Road reserve refers to the publicly owned or controlled strip of land set aside for a road and its associated infrastructure, including the roadway, footpaths, verges, nature strips, drainage, and street trees.) covered 14.27% (14.5 km²). The Eastern Catchment (Note: The Eastern Catchment encompasses the suburbs of Smithfield along its northwestern boundary, Fairfield in the centre, Cabramatta to the south, Lansvale to the southeast, Old Guildford to the east, and Mount Pritchard to the southwest.) contained the greatest area of road reserves at 6.77 km², followed by the Central Catchment (Note: The Central Catchment encompasses Wetherill Park to the north, Bossley Park and Abbotsbury along its southeastern boundary, Bonnyrigg to the south, and the western part of Fairfield West along its western boundary.) at 6.33 km² and the Western Catchment (Note: The Western Catchment predominantly encompasses Horsley Park, as well as Cecil Park to the southwest, Abbotsbury to the southeast, and the greenbelt area of Wetherill Park to the northeast.) at 1.4 km². The Central Catchment contained the largest number of road reserves (1,039), followed by the Eastern (916) and Western (45) catchments. Street trees within Fairfield City's road reserves provided approximately 1,447,900 m² of canopy cover, representing 9.98% of the total road reserve area and 9.32% of the City's overall tree canopy. The Eastern and Central catchments had canopy coverage of 9.23% and 9.62%, respectively, while the Western Catchment had a higher proportion of canopy cover within its road reserves despite having approximately one-third the street tree canopy area of the other two catchments, owing to its substantially smaller road-reserve area. Within the city, the greatest recorded street-tree canopy cover is found along Burley Road in Horsley Park, at approximately 48,605 m², followed by Cowpasture Road in Abbotsbury (32,564 m²), Elizabeth Drive in Cecil Hills (20,020 m²), and Wallgrove Road in Horsley Park (16,501 m²).

Among the three catchments, the Central Catchment had the highest average street temperature, at 8.52°C above the baseline. The three hottest road reserves were Metters Place in Wetherill Park (Central Catchment), with an average temperature of 11.16°C, followed by Spencer Lane in Fairfield and Arthur Street in Cabramatta (both in the Eastern Catchment), with average temperatures of 10.82°C and 10.81°C, respectively. Temperatures across the Western Catchment average 4.63°C above the baseline. The cooler conditions compared with the Eastern and Central Catchments can be attributed to the prevalence of rural and parkland land uses, which contain fewer built structures and greater areas of bushland and porous surfaces. Planting survival rates are generally higher when trees are planted during the more temperate months, particularly autumn, when heat stress and insect activity are reduced. As road reserves are linear features that may cross catchment boundaries, reserves extending across multiple catchments were assigned to the catchment containing the majority of their area. Within each Catchment, Council has identified signature street tree species representative of the area. The Eastern Catchment is characterised by Lophostemon confertus, the Central Catchment by Cupaniopsis anacardioides, and the Western Catchment by endemic species associated with the Cumberland Plain Woodlands.

== Economy ==
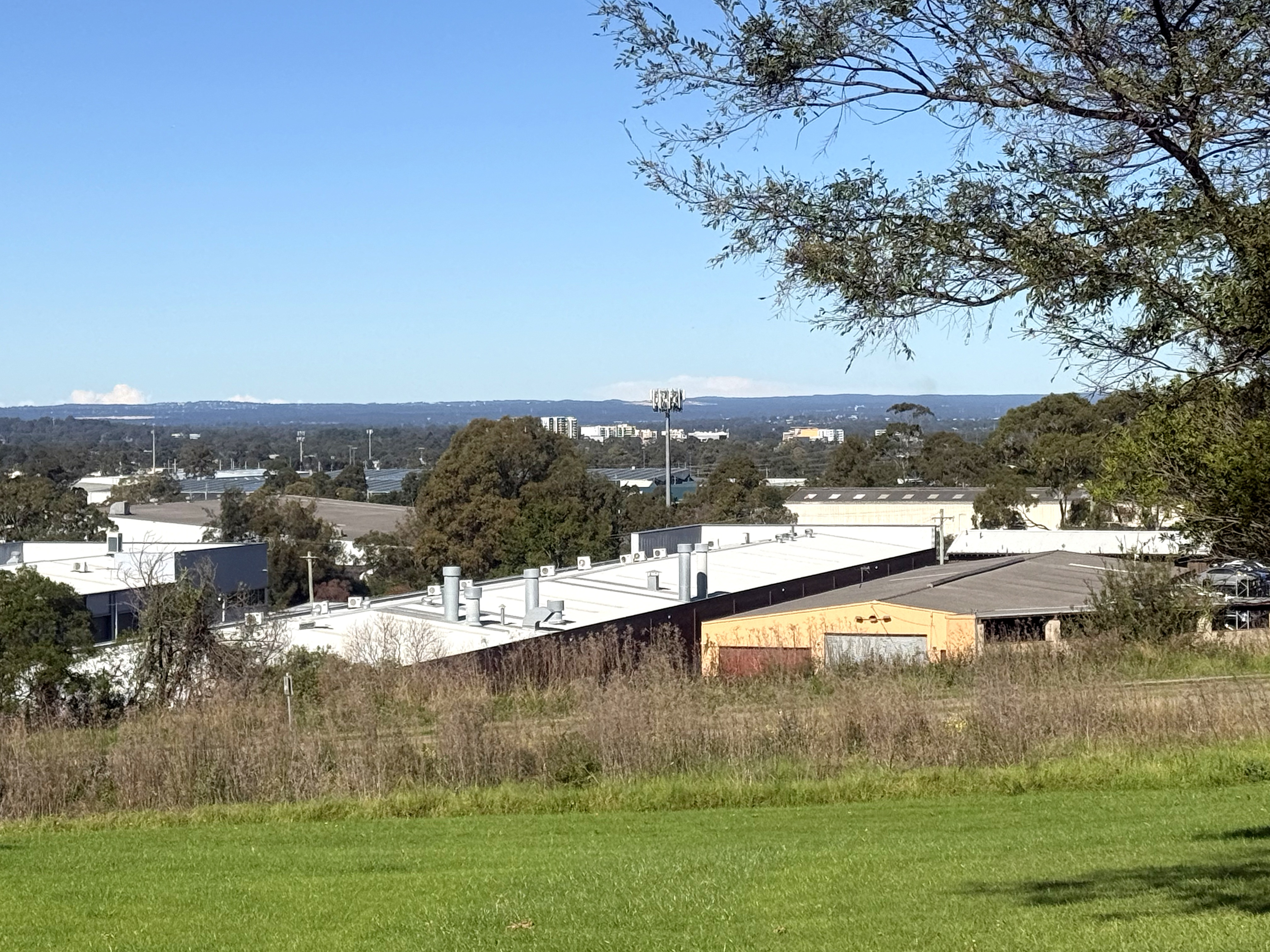
Smithfield's industrial area, viewed from Greystanes, with the Fairfield CBD skyline in the background.

Fairfield City's economy has expanded substantially since the early 2000s, with annual economic output exceeding A$12 billion. As of 2023, the local economy supported more than 18,000 businesses and over 58,000 jobs. Approximately two-thirds of businesses operated in the construction, logistics, property services, retail, professional services and manufacturing sectors, while more than half of local employment was concentrated in manufacturing, health care, domestic and international tourism, social assistance, education, retail and construction. According to Fairfield City Council, most economic activity is generated by the private sector, with local economic output in 2023 equivalent to more than A$58,000 per resident.

According to Fairfield City Council's 2019 Economic Development Strategy, the city's economy was characterised by strong manufacturing, wholesale trade, transport, postal and warehousing, construction and other service industries. Manufacturing was the largest employment sector, supporting 11,581 jobs, accounting for 15.3 per cent of local employment, and generating approximately A$1.296 billion in economic output. Residential construction also expanded in response to population growth across Greater Sydney, contributing approximately 2,739 jobs and A$427.4 million in economic output. Over the two years preceding the report, Fairfield City's economy grew by an average of 5.5 per cent per year, exceeding the Greater Sydney average.

In a 2022 Liquor and Gaming NSW report, Fairfield was found to be the local government area (LGA) with the highest net profit for poker machines in clubs in the state, making A$225 million over six months between June/July and November/December. The neighbouring LGAs of Canterbury Bankstown and Cumberland made A$204 and A$133 million, respectively.

=== Business and industry ===
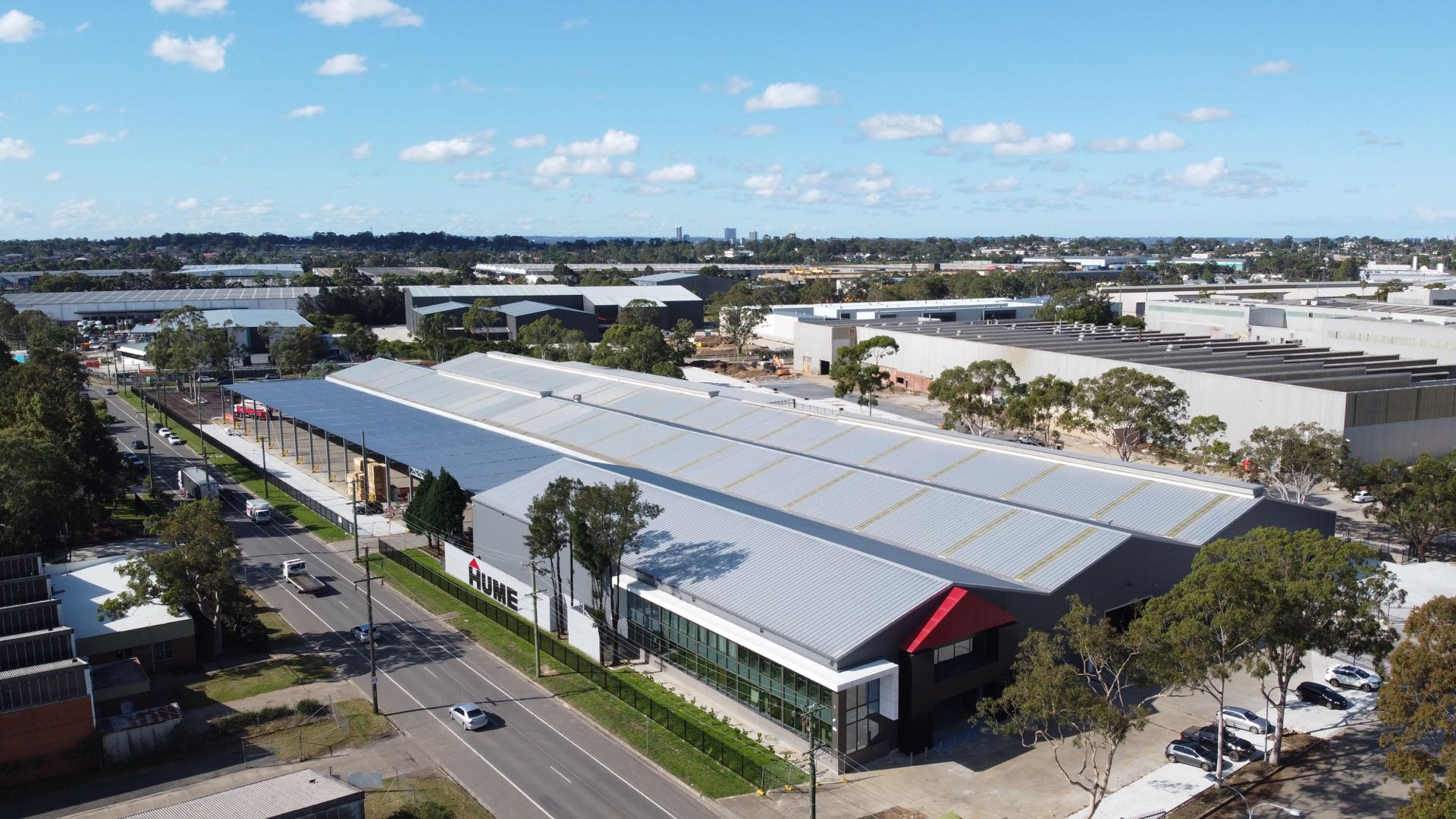
Yennora industrial zone, showing Pine Road and the Hume Building Products warehouses.

The Smithfield-Wetherill Park Industrial Estate is Sydney's largest manufacturing precinct, generating more than A$2.6 billion in annual economic output. Covering approximately 960 hectares (2,372 acres), it is located near the M4 Motorway and Westlink M7, and supports more than 2,600 businesses and approximately 18,000 jobs. Fairfield City Council is also home to the Yennora industrial zone, where key operators in the area include Toll, Woolworths, Linfox, Australian Wool Handlers, Qube and Hume Building Products. Fairfield City Centre is a major commercial and civic precinct containing a wide range of retail, cultural, dining and community facilities. It is served by the Cumberland railway line and supports more than 2,550 jobs, generating approximately A$270 million in annual economic output. Cabramatta supports more than 2,300 jobs and generates approximately A$258 million in annual economic output.

The Canley Corridor, comprising Canley Vale and Canley Heights, is one of seven precincts expected to accommodate a substantial proportion of Fairfield City's future population growth and housing development. The precinct is centred on Canley Vale Road, which contains a concentration of restaurants, cafés and other hospitality businesses. Prairiewood has been identified as a major area for future residential and employment growth. It currently supports approximately 2,800 jobs and generates around A$250 million in annual economic output. The Horsley Park and Cecil Park Urban Investigation Area has been identified as a strategic location for future infrastructure supporting the Western Sydney Airport and the Western Sydney Aerotropolis. The investigation area covers approximately 1,575 hectares (3,892 acres) and has the potential to accommodate more than 20,000 dwellings.

=== Waste management ===
Fairfield City Council is responsible for providing waste-collection and resource-recovery services across the local government area. General waste collected from red-lidded bins is transported directly to the Lucas Heights Landfill under the council's existing waste-disposal contract, which is in place until 2030. Food organics and garden organics (FOGO) waste is transported to Eastern Creek Waste Management Centre, a processing facility on Wallgrove Road in Eastern Creek. Recyclable materials collected from yellow-lidded bins are transported to the Regroup Material Recovery Facility in Strathfield for sorting and processing.

General waste is collected weekly using a red-lidded bin with a dark green body. The bin is intended for household waste that cannot be recycled, reused or otherwise diverted from disposal. Food organics and garden organics (FOGO) are collected fortnightly using a lime-green-lidded bin with a black body. The service accepts food waste and garden organics, which are transported to a processing facility where they are converted into compost. The resulting compost is used in parks, gardens, agricultural land and sports fields. Only biodegradable organic material is accepted in the FOGO stream, as contamination can reduce the effectiveness of the composting process and limit the recovery of organic resources. Recyclable materials are collected fortnightly using a yellow-lidded bin with a dark green body. The service accepts approved recyclable items, which are transported to a materials recovery facility (MRF) for sorting before being sent to specialised recycling facilities for processing into new products. Recyclable items are placed loose in the bin rather than bagged, as plastic bags and other soft plastics cannot be processed through the kerbside recycling system and may contaminate recyclable materials.

== Heritage listings ==
The City of Fairfield has a number of heritage-listed sites, including:

- Bonnyrigg, Cartwright Street: Bonnyrigg House
- Bonnyrigg, Lot 1 Cartwright Street: Male Orphan School land
- Fairfield, Great Southern railway: Fairfield railway station, Sydney
- Horsley Park, 52–58 Jamieson Close: Horsley complex
- Lansvale, Hume Highway: Lansdowne Bridge

== Demographics ==
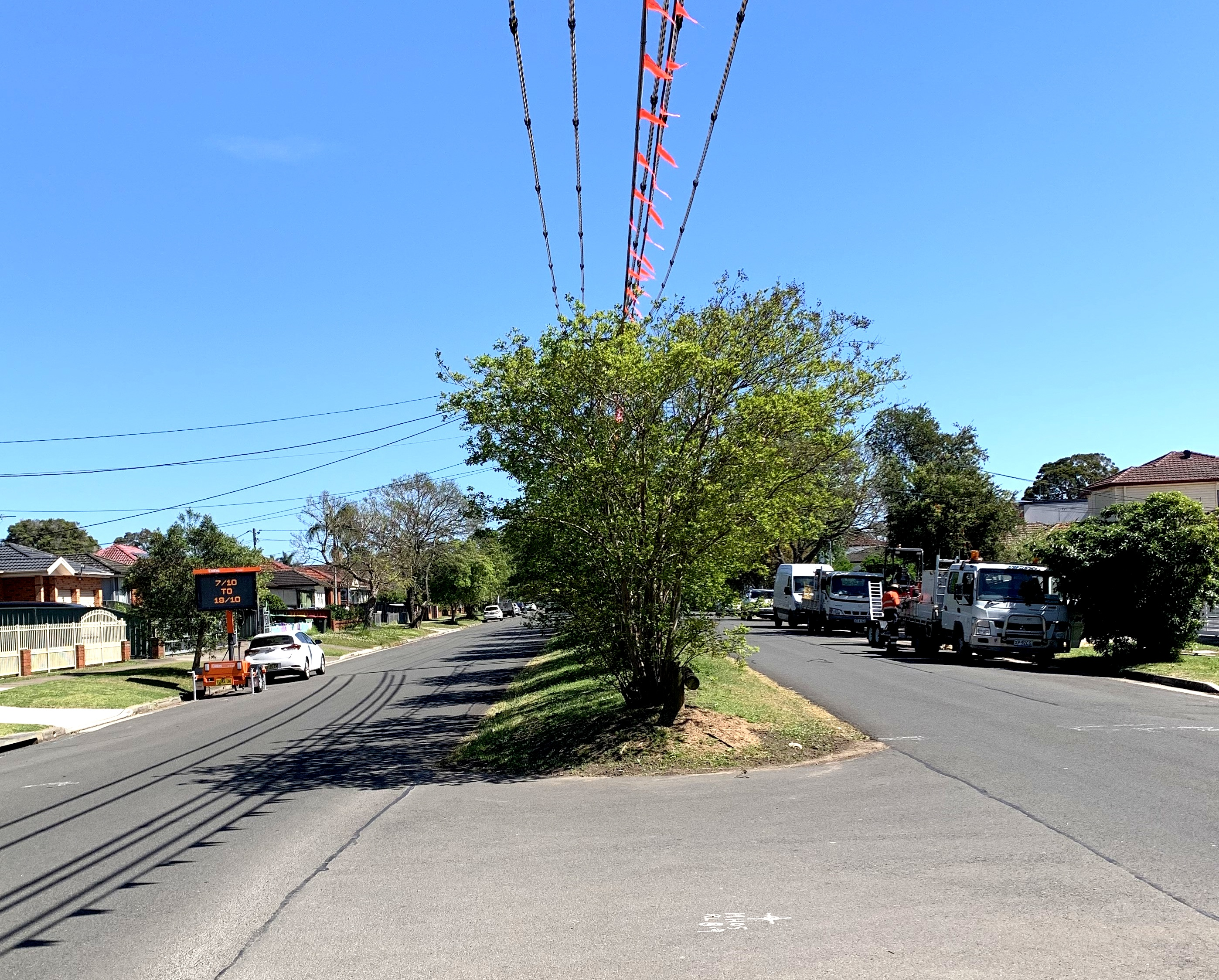
The Avenue in Fairfield, featuring low density houses and an avenue of trees

At the 2021 census there were 208,475 people in the Fairfield local government area, of these 49.3 per cent were male and 50.7 per cent were female. Aboriginal and Torres Strait Islander people made up 0.7 per cent of the population; significantly below the NSW and Australian averages of 3.4 and 3.2 per cent respectively. The median age of people in the City of Fairfield was 39 years; slightly higher than the national median of 38 years. Children aged 0 – 14 years made up 17.9 per cent of the population and people aged 65 years and over made up 16.7 per cent of the population. Of people in the area aged 15 years and over, 46.5 per cent were married and 12.9 per cent were either divorced or separated.

Population in the City of Fairfield between the 2001 census and the 2006 census declined by 0.78 per cent; and in the subsequent five years to the 2011 census, population growth was 4.38 per cent. At the 2016 census, the population in the City increased by 5.89 per cent. When compared with total population growth of Australia for the same period, being 8.8 per cent, population growth in the Fairfield local government area was a little over half the national average.

The median weekly income for residents within the City of Fairfield was lower than the national average, being one of the factors that place the city in an area of social disadvantage.

As at the 2016 census, the influence of Vietnamese culture and language was statistically strong, evidenced by the proportion of residents with Vietnamese ancestry (nearly twenty times higher than the national average), the proportion of residents who spoke Vietnamese as either a first or second language (also nearly twenty times higher than the national average), and the proportion of residents who stated a religious affiliation with Catholicism and Buddhism (the latter being in excess of nine times the national average).

Selected historical census data for Fairfield local government area
Census year		2001	2006	2011	2016	2021
Population	Estimated residents on census night	181,300	▼179,893	▲187,766	▲198,817	▲208,475
Population	LGA rank in terms of size within New South Wales			5th	▼11th	▼13th
Population	% of New South Wales population			2.71%	▼2.66%	▼2.58%
Population	% of Australian population	0.97%	▼0.91%	▼0.87%	▼0.85%	▼0.82%
Median weekly incomes						
Personal income	Median weekly personal income		A$319	▲ A$369	▲ A$439	▲ A$485
Personal income	% of Australian median income		68.5%	▼64.0%	▲66.3%	▼60.2%
Family income	Median weekly family income		A$946	▲ A$1,065	▲ A$1,263	▲ A$1,482
Family income	% of Australian median income		80.8%	▼71.9%	▲72.8%	▼69.9%
Household income	Median weekly household income		A$873	▲ A$1,022	▲ A$1,222	▲ A$1,390
Household income	% of Australian median income		85.0%	▼82.8%	▲85.0%	▼79.6%

Selected historical census data for Fairfield local government area
Ancestry, top responses
2001		2006		2011		2016		2021	
No Data		No Data		Vietnamese	14.6%	Vietnamese	▲16.8%	Vietnamese	▲19.5%
No Data		No Data		Chinese	11.7%	Chinese	▼11.4%	Chinese	▲13.1%
No Data		No Data		Australian	8.6%	Australian	▼7.8%	Australian	▲8.8%
No Data		No Data		English	7.4%	English	▼6.9%	Assyrian	▲8.2%
No Data		No Data		Italian	5.9%	Assyrian	▲5.7%	English	▲7.2%
Country of birth, top responses
2001		2006		2011		2016		2021	
Australia	41.6%	Australia	▼41.5%	Australia	▲42.4%	Australia	▼40.6%	Australia	▼38.6%
Vietnam	13.8%	Vietnam	▼13.7%	Vietnam	▲14.6%	Vietnam	▲15.5%	Vietnam	▲16.3%
Iraq	4.3%	Iraq	▲5.8%	Iraq	▲7.7%	Iraq	▲9.4%	Iraq	▲12.0%
Cambodia	3.7%	Cambodia	▼3.6%	Cambodia	▲3.7%	Cambodia	3.7%	Cambodia	▼3.6%
Italy	2.9%	Italy	▼2.6%	Italy	▼2.2%	China	▲2.0%	Syria	▲2.8%
China	2.3%	China	▼2.1%	China	2.1%	Italy	▼1.7%	China	▼1.8%
Language, top responses (other than English)
2001		2006		2011		2016		2021	
Vietnamese	15.5%	Vietnamese	▲17.0%	Vietnamese	▲19.1%	Vietnamese	▲20.4%	Vietnamese	▲21.1%
Cantonese	5.8%	Arabic	▲6.4%	Arabic	▲7.3%	Arabic	▲7.9%	Arabic	▲9.3%
Assyrian (incl. Aramaic)	4.9%	Assyrian	▲6.1%	Assyrian Neo-Aramaic	▼5.6%	Assyrian Neo-Aramaic	▲6.7%	Assyrian Neo-Aramaic	▲7.8%
Spanish	4.9%	Cantonese	▼5.6%	Cantonese	▼5.0%	Cantonese	▼4.3%	Chaldean Neo-Aramaic	▲4.0%
Arabic (incl. Lebanese)	4.9%	Spanish	▼4.3%	Spanish	▼3.8%	Khmer	▲3.6%	Cantonese	▼3.7%
Religious affiliation, top responses
2001		2006		2011		2016		2021	
Catholic	36.1%	Catholic	▼35.2%	Catholic	▼33.9%	Catholic	▼30.9%	Catholic	▼30.3%
Buddhism	21.2%	Buddhism	▲22.1%	Buddhism	▲23.0%	Buddhism	▼20.7%	Buddhism	▼19.9%
Anglican	7.7%	Eastern Orthodox	▲6.5%	No Religion	▲7.7%	No Religion	▲12.6%	No Religion	▲14.6%
Orthodox	7.0%	No Religion	▲6.4%	Eastern Orthodox	▼5.9%	Not stated	▲7.3%	Not stated	▼7.0%
No Religion	5.9%	Anglican	▼6.4%	Anglican	▼5.3%	Islam	▲5.9%	Islam	▲6.3%

== Council ==
=== Current composition and election method ===
Fairfield City Council is composed of thirteen councillors, including the mayor, for a fixed four-year term of office. The mayor has been directly elected since 2004, while the twelve other Councillors are elected proportionally to two separate wards, each electing six councillors. The most recent election was held on 2 December 2021, and the makeup of the council, including the mayor, is as follows:

Party	Councillors
Western Sydney Community	10
Australian Labor Party	3
Total	13

The current Council, elected in 2021, in order of election by ward, is:

Ward	Councillor	Party	Notes
Mayor	Frank Carbone	Western Sydney Community	Labor until 29 August 2016, serving as mayor for a fixed four-year term from 2021.
Fairfield/Cabravale	Kien Ly	Labor	
Fairfield/Cabravale	Dai Le	Western Sydney Community	Deputy Mayor 2021–2022, 2024–present. Also serving as the member for Fowler since May 2022.
Fairfield/Cabravale	Milovan Karajcic	Western Sydney Community	
Fairfield/Cabravale	Kevin Lam	Western Sydney Community	
Fairfield/Cabravale	Carmen Lazar	Labor	
Fairfield/Cabravale	Charbel Saliba	Western Sydney Community	Currently serving as Deputy Mayor as of February 2024.
Parks	Reni Barkho	Western Sydney Community	Deputy Mayor 2023–2024.
Parks	Hugo Morvillo	Western Sydney Community	
Parks	Andrew Rohan	Western Sydney Community	
Parks	Marie Saliba	Western Sydney Community	
Parks	Michael Mijatovic	Western Sydney Community	
Parks	George Barcha	Labor	

=== Past composition ===
Election	Seats (including directly elected mayors)								Notes
Election	Labor	Liberal	Ind. Liberal	Unity	Women's	Official Labour	Progress	Independent (Note: Including local groups.)	Notes
1953	6	—N/a	0	—N/a	—N/a	2	6	1	
2004	9	3	0	1	—N/a	—N/a	—N/a	0	
2008	8	4	0	0	—N/a	—N/a	—N/a	1	
2012	7	—N/a	4	1	—N/a	—N/a	—N/a	1	
2016	6	3	0	—N/a	—N/a	—N/a	—N/a	4	
2021	3	—N/a	0	—N/a	3	—N/a	—N/a	7	Fairfield Ward and Cabravale Ward merged to create Fairfield/Cabravale Ward

== Election results ==
=== 2024 ===
2024 Fairfield City Council election: Ward results
Party	Votes	%	Swing	Seats	Change
Frank Carbone	45,695	44.1	+1.6	6	Steady
Dai Le	29,455	29.5	+9.3	3	Steady
Labor	16,160	16.1	−8.8	2	▼1
Independents	10,231	10.1	+6.9	1	▲1
Family First	216	0.2		0	Steady
Formal votes	101,757	88.1			
Informal votes	13,722	11.9			
Turnout	115,479				

=== 2021 ===
2021 New South Wales local elections: Fairfield
Party	Votes	%	Swing	Seats	Change
Frank Carbone	39,445	42.5		6	
Dai Le	18,774	20.2		3	
Labor	23,081	24.9	−20.2	3	▼3
The Real Local	3,468	3.7	+3.7	0	Steady
Independent	3,007	3.2		0	
Our Local Community	2,880	3.1	+3.1	0	Steady
Independent Liberal	2,207	2.4	−16.1 (Note: Compared with the Liberal Party result at the 2016 election.)	0	▼3
Formal votes	92,862				

== Town Clerks/General Manager/City Managers ==
Name	Term	Notes
George Edward Young	28 February 1889 – 1 September 1891	
Francis Atkin Kenyon	1 September 1891 – 4 November 1892	
Edward Farr	4 November 1892 – 17 July 1900	
Richard Henry Stokes Dummett	17 July 1900 – 3 April 1916	
George Davis	3 April 1916 – 1 August 1942	
William James Witt	1 August 1942 – May 1953	
Vic Winton	May 1953 – 1976	
F. A. Elliott	1976–1986	
Terry Barnes	1986 – October 1999	
Alan Young	October 1999 – date	

== Sister cities ==
- Palmi, Italy
- Zhenjiang, China
