= Cabramatta West =

- Suburb
- Interactive map of Cabramatta West
- Country: Australia
- State: New South Wales
- City: Sydney
- LGA: City of Fairfield
- Location: 32 km (20 mi) west of Sydney CBD

Government
  - State electorate: Cabramatta
  - Federal division: Fowler

Area
  - Total: 1.8 km^{2} (0.69 sq mi)
- Elevation: 38 m (125 ft)

Population
  - Total: 7,822 (2021 census)
  - Density: 4,350/km^{2} (11,250/sq mi)
- Postcode: 2166
Suburbs around Cabramatta West
St Johns Park	Canley Heights	Canley Heights
Bonnyrigg	Cabramatta West	Cabramatta
Bonnyrigg	Mount Pritchard	Cabramatta

Cabramatta West is a suburb of Sydney, in the state of New South Wales, Australia 32 kilometres south-west of the Sydney central business district, in the local government area of the City of Fairfield. It is part of the south-western region. Cabramatta is a separate suburb, to the east.

== History ==
Cabramatta West was originally a part of the suburb Cabramatta. In the dialect of the original inhabitants, the Cabrogal, a cabra was a tasty fresh water grub. A 100-acre (0.40 km^{2}) block of land in the area, owned by the Bull family, was named Cabramatta Park and the name gradually spread to the surrounding area.

== Demographics ==
According to the 2021 census, there were 7,822 residents in Cabramatta West. 38.6% of people were born in Australia. The next most common countries of birth were Vietnam 30.4%, Cambodia 6.7%, Iraq 3.0%, Italy 1.4% and China 1.4%. 19.1% of people spoke only English at home. Other languages spoken at home included Vietnamese 40.9%, Khmer 5.8%, Cantonese 4.7%, Arabic 3.5% and Mandarin 2.6%. The most common responses for religion were Buddhism 36.3%, No Religion 19.9% and Catholic 19.2%.

== Commercial area ==
The primary shopping centre is located on what is known locally as Cooks Hill.
