= Busby, New South Wales =

Busby
- Suburb
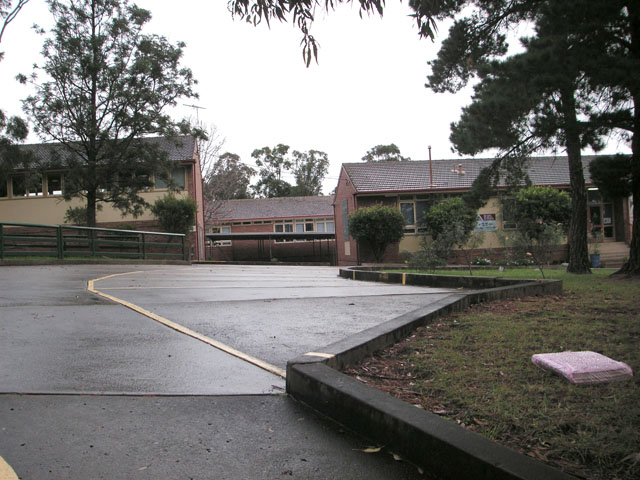
- Busby Public School

- Interactive map of Busby
- Country: Australia
- State: New South Wales
- City: Sydney
- LGA: City of Liverpool
- Location: 37 km (23 mi) south-west of Sydney CBD

Government
  - State electorate: Liverpool
  - Federal division: Werriwa

Population
  - Total: 4,446 (2021 census)
- Postcode: 2168
Suburbs around Busby
Green Valley	Bonnyrigg	Heckenberg
Green Valley	Busby	Sadleir
Hinchinbrook	Miller	Cartwright

Busby is a suburb of Sydney, in the state of New South Wales, Australia. Busby is located 37 kilometres south-west of the Sydney central business district, in the local government area of the City of Liverpool. Neighbouring suburbs include Miller, Heckenberg, Hinchinbrook, Green Valley and Bonnyrigg.

== History ==
Busby was named after James Busby (1801–1871), widely regarded as the father of the Australian wine industry. Busby, who arrived in Sydney from Scotland in 1824, was a teacher of Viticulture at the Male Orphans School at Bald Hills near Liverpool. The school closed in 1851.

Busby was part of the Green Valley housing estate, which was developed in the 1960s and 1970s.

== Demographics ==
According to the 2021 census of population, there were 4,446 residents in Busby.

- Aboriginal and Torres Strait Islander people made up 5.2% of the population.
- 54.7% of people were born in Australia. The most common other countries of birth were Vietnam 6.8%, Lebanon 5.4%, Iraq 3.2%, New Zealand 2.9% and Fiji 1.8%.
- 37.9% of people only spoke English at home. Other languages spoken at home included Arabic 22.0%, Vietnamese 9.6%, Samoan 2.8%, Khmer 2.2% and Hindi 2.0%.
- The most common responses for religion in Busby were Islam 23.3%, Catholic 16.7%, No Religion 16.1%, Not stated 11.3% and Buddhism 8.8%. In Busby, Christianity was the largest religious group reported overall (41.2%) (this figure excludes not stated responses).

== Schools ==
Busby has two Primary Schools (Busby Public School and Busby West Public School) and a High School (James Busby High School).

== Parks ==
Whitlam Park is named after former Australian Prime Minister Gough Whitlam.
