= Sadleir, New South Wales =

Sadleir
- Suburb
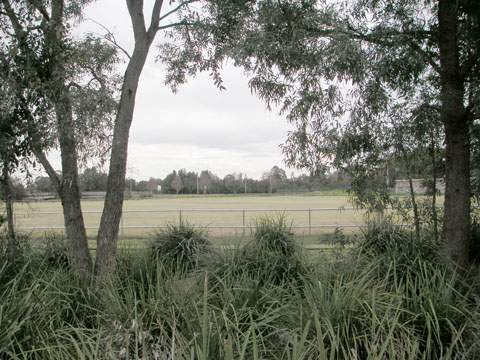
- Landa Park, Sadleir

- Interactive map of Sadleir
- Country: Australia
- State: New South Wales
- City: Sydney
- LGA: City of Liverpool
- Location: 37 km (23 mi) south-west of Sydney CBD

Government
  - State electorate: Liverpool
  - Federal division: Werriwa

Population
  - Total: 3,243 (2021 census)
- Postcode: 2168
Suburbs around Sadleir
Busby	Heckenberg	Mount Pritchard
Busby	Sadleir	Ashcroft
Miller	Cartwright	Liverpool

Sadleir is a suburb in south-western Sydney, in the state of New South Wales, Australia. Sadleir is located 37 kilometres south-west of the Sydney central business district, in the local government area of the City of Liverpool.

== History ==
Sadleir was named after Richard Sadleir, the first mayor of Liverpool in 1872. Sadleir was part of the Green Valley housing estate, which was subdivided in 1960.

== Demographics ==
According to the 2021 census, Sadleir had a population of 3,243. The average age was 33, slightly lower than the national average, with higher than expected numbers of people in the 0-14 and 65 plus age groups. There was a significant housing commission population with around a third of the suburb's dwellings belonging to the Department of Housing. The median household income of $946 per week was substantially less than the national average ($1,746). In Sadleir 54.0% of people were born in Australia, with the most common countries of birth were Vietnam 9.4%, Lebanon 6.0%, Iraq 3.2%, Fiji 1.9% and Cambodia 1.6%.

== Education ==
Sadleir Public School is the only school in the suburb. The nearest high school is in neighbouring Miller and Ashcroft, New South Wales.
