= Miller, New South Wales =

Miller
- Suburb
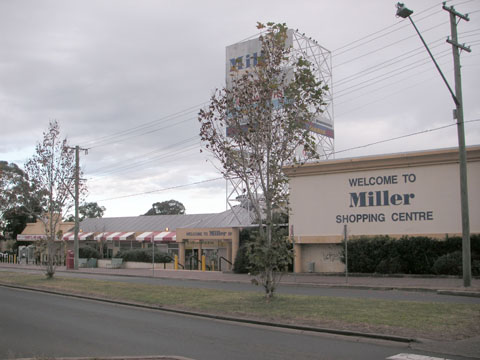
- Miller Central

- Interactive map of Miller
- Country: Australia
- State: New South Wales
- City: Sydney
- LGA: City of Liverpool
- Location: 38 km (24 mi) SW of Sydney CBD
- Established: 1965

Government
  - State electorate: Liverpool
  - Federal division: Werriwa

Population
  - Total: 3,374 (2021 census)
- Postcode: 2168
Suburbs around Miller
Hinchinbrook	Busby	Busby
Hinchinbrook	Miller	Sadleir
Hoxton Park	Prestons	Cartwright

Miller is a suburb of Sydney in the state of New South Wales, Australia 38 kilometres south-west of the Sydney central business district, in the local government area of the City of Liverpool. Neighbouring suburbs include Hoxton Park, Hinchinbrook, Cartwright, Prestons, Sadleir and Busby.

== History ==
Miller was part of the Green Valley housing estate which was developed between 1961 and 1965. It is named after Peter Miller, an early landholder in the Green Valley area. When in construction, the fertile top soil was unofficially trucked over to Beecroft, leaving just red clay exposed. Before development, it was noted how lush and fertile this area was.

== Schools ==
- Miller Technology High School (contains an English-language program for immigrant children from the entire Liverpool council area)
- Miller Public School
- Miller College
- St Therese Catholic Primary School (Also considered to be in Sadlier)

== Population ==
At the 2021 census, the suburb of Miller recorded a population of 3,374 people. The median age of people in Miller was 35 years, compared to the national median of 38 years. Children aged under 15 years made up 22.5% of the population and people aged 65 years and over made up 13.8% of the population. Aboriginal and Torres Strait Islander people made up 4.7% of the population. Just over half (54.7%) of people were born in Australia, compared to the national average of 66.9%; the next most common countries of birth were Vietnam (6.8%), Lebanon (5.5%), Iraq (2.9%), New Zealand (2.8%) and Fiji (2.0%). Just under half (42.7%) of the population spoke only English at home; the next most common languages were Arabic (18.6%), Vietnamese (10.2%), Samoan (2.7%), Khmer (1.7%) and Hindi (1.6%). The most common responses for religion were Islam 23.5%, Catholic 18.3%, No Religion 16.3%, Not stated 10.6% and Buddhism 7.5%.

The median household income was $825 per week, just under half the national median of $1,746 per week. The average household size was 2.8 people.

== Commercial area ==
Miller Central is the main shopping centre in Miller that is currently managed by Savills. It contains a Woolworths, Aldi, and approximately 32 other shops. Miller Shopping Centre was sold to new owners in early 2011 and renovations were completed to improve the suburb's appeal.
