= Hinchinbrook, New South Wales =

Hinchinbrook
- Suburb
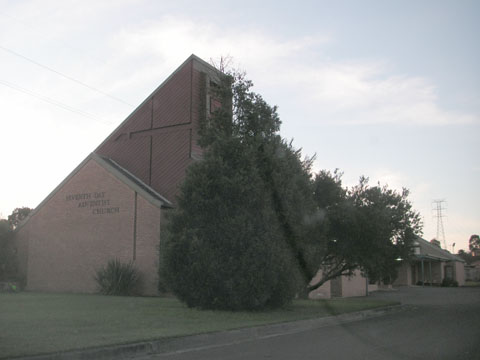
- Seventh Day Adventist Church

- Interactive map of Hinchinbrook
- Country: Australia
- State: New South Wales
- City: Sydney
- LGA: City of Liverpool
- Location: 35 km (22 mi) south-west of Sydney
- Established: 1986

Government
  - State electorates: Liverpool; Leppington
  - Federal division: Werriwa

Population
  - Total: 11,521 (2021 census)
- Postcode: 2168
Suburbs around Hinchinbrook
Cecil Park	Green Valley	Busby
Middleton Grange	Hinchinbrook	Miller
West Hoxton	Hoxton Park	Prestons

Hinchinbrook is a suburb of Sydney, in the state of New South Wales, Australia. Hinchinbrook is located 35 kilometres south-west of the Sydney central business district, in the local government area of the City of Liverpool. It is bordered by Hoxton Park and Green Valley.

The main shopping precinct features the Valley Plaza. Schools include Hoxton Park High School, Hinchinbrook Public School, Good Samaritan Catholic College and James Busby High School.

It is also homes to various clubs, such as the Uruguayan Social Sporting Club. Population has boomed as a result of new housing developments. New facilities have been developed to cater for the area, most notably the M7 Motorway.

== History ==
Hinchinbrook is quite a new suburb, having only been formed in 1986 from what was then the southern part of Green Valley and the northern part of Hoxton Park. Its name comes from Hinchinbrook Creek which runs through the suburb. The creek was named after a property in adjacent Cecil Hills which had belonged to former Supreme Court Judge Barron Field, who in turn had named the property after the English estate of John Montagu, 4th Earl of Sandwich.

A Hinchinbrook Post Office was open from 1 August 1883 until 1885.

== Population ==
At the 2021 census, there were 11,521 residents in Hinchinbrook. 47.7% of people were born in Australia. The next most common countries of birth were Iraq (10.7%), Vietnam (5.4%), Fiji (5.0%), Philippines (2.4%) and Lebanon (2.0%). 33.0% of people spoke only English at home. Other languages spoken at home included Arabic (13.2%), Vietnamese (8.1%), Assyrian Neo-Aramaic (5.3%), Hindi (5.1%) and Spanish (4.0%). The top responses for religious affiliation were Catholic (30.8%), Islam (13.4%), No Religion (10.7%), Buddhism (9.9%) and Eastern Orthodox (4.9%).

== Sport ==
Hinchinbrook is home to the Hinchinbrook Hornets Junior Rugby League Club, and compete in the Western Suburbs District Junior Rugby League competition and the Sydney combined competition.
