= Ashcroft, New South Wales =

Ashcroft
- Suburb
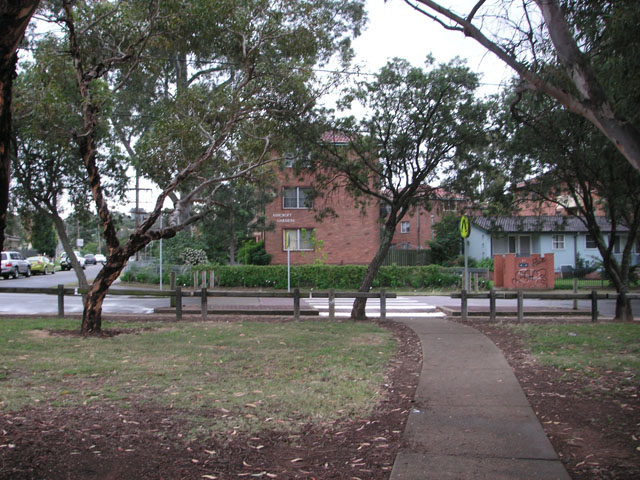

- Interactive map of Ashcroft
- Country: Australia
- State: New South Wales
- City: Sydney
- LGA: City of Liverpool
- Location: 35 km (22 mi) south-west of Sydney CBD
- Established: 1972

Government
  - State electorate: Liverpool
  - Federal division: Werriwa

Population
  - Total: 3,634 (2021 census)
- Postcode: 2168
Suburbs around Ashcroft
Heckenberg	Mount Pritchard	Liverpool
Sadleir	Ashcroft	Liverpool
Cartwright	Lurnea	Liverpool

Ashcroft is a suburb of Sydney, in the state of New South Wales, Australia 35 kilometres south-west of the Sydney central business district, in the local government area of the City of Liverpool.

== History ==
The suburb was formed as part of the Housing Commission's Green Valley development. It was named Ashcroft after the pioneering family in the district that gave the land for the site of this development. The Ashcroft family was active in establishing meat wholesaling and retailing activities at the Homebush Bay abattoir. E.J. Ashcroft was a butcher at Liverpool in the 1890s. Although named earlier, Ashcroft was officially gazetted on 7 April 1972. Ashcroft Post Office opened on 3 May 1965 and closed in 1985.

== Demographics ==
According to the 2021 Census, there were 3,634 people in Ashcroft.

- Aboriginal and Torres Strait Islander people made up 4.0% of the population.
- 51.0% of people were born in Australia. The next most common countries of birth were Vietnam 8.3%, Lebanon 4.9%, and Iraq 4.8%.
- 35.1% of people only spoke English at home. Other languages spoken at home included Arabic 21.2%, and Vietnamese 12.6%.
- The most common responses for religion were Islam 23.9% and Catholic 17.7%. The suburb of Ashcroft is somewhat unique in the fact that most of its residents are religious, bucking a trend reflected in the 2021 Census with 15.5% of residents marking themselves with No Religion compared to an average of 38.4% in the nation.

== Notable residents ==
- Mark Latham – former leader of the Australian Labor Party.
- Joseph Gatehau – finalist on the 2006 series of Australian Idol.
- X-Factor finalist Mahogany, (9th contestant eliminated) attended Ashcroft High School.
- Brad Fittler – a Rugby league great, a former Ashcroft resident and also attended Ashcroft High School.
- Jason Taylor – former professional rugby league footballer and former coach of the South Sydney Rabbitohs, a former Ashcroft resident and also attended Ashcroft High School.
- Ben Te'o – Rugby league player with South Sydney Rabbitohs attended Ashcroft High School.
- Junior Paulo – Rugby League player for Canberra Raiders attended Ashcroft High School.

== Notable events ==
Ashcroft High School were the first co-educational school to win the Amco Shield (now called the Arrive Alive Cup). They won the Amco Shield in 1977 and again in 1985. In 1976, Ashcroft became the first city school to win the University Shield for 31 years and went on to win it again in 1977, 1984 and 1985. They were also Amco Shield runner up in 1976 and University Shield runner up in 1978. Ashcroft High also won the Buckley Shield in 1982 and 1987. Ashcroft Primary School also won the Westmont Shield, year unknown. Ashcroft is the only suburb that has one all major schoolboys rugby league competitions, Amco Shield, University Shield, Buckley Shield and Westmont Shield along with numerous Parramatta and state knockouts. Also in 1977 Ashcroft High played the curtain-raiser to the Grand Final replay between Parramatta and St George. They were narrowly beaten by the NSW CHS team.

== Notable landmarks ==
The small Ashcroft side corner shop which contains a food takeaway shop, a hairdresser's and a doctors surgery also boasts a mural on the side of the building on Carpenter Lane. The mural depicts a waterfall flowing into the ocean and a forest with a tropical bird and frog in the trees.

== Sport and recreation ==
A number of well-known sporting teams represent the local area. One of them is the rugby league club All Saints Liverpool.
