= Mount Pritchard =

- Suburb
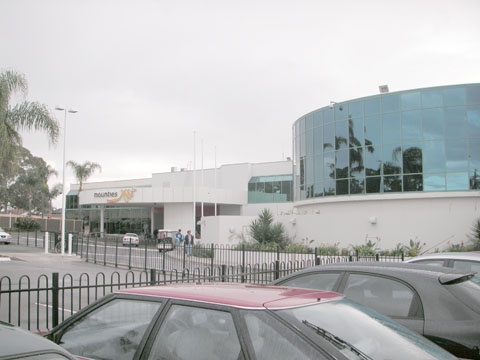
- Mounties Club

- Interactive map of Mount Pritchard
- Country: Australia
- State: New South Wales
- City: Sydney
- LGAs: City of Fairfield; City of Liverpool
- Location: 34 km (21 mi) west of Sydney CBD
- Established: 1896

Government
  - State electorates: Cabramatta; Liverpool
  - Federal divisions: Fowler; Werriwa
- Elevation: 40 m (130 ft)

Population
  - Total: 10,426 (2021 census)
- Postcode: 2170
Suburbs around Mount Pritchard
Bonnyrigg	Cabramatta West	Cabramatta
Heckenberg	Mount Pritchard	Cabramatta
Ashcroft	Liverpool	Liverpool

Mount Pritchard is a suburb of Sydney, in the state of New South Wales, Australia 34 kilometres west of the Sydney central business district, in the local government areas of the City of Fairfield and the City of Liverpool, and is part of the South-western Sydney region.

== History ==
Mount Pritchard was originally home to the Cabrogal people who occupied much of the greater Fairfield area. In the early 19th century, the land was granted to a number of ex-convicts for farming. Later it was made part of the Male Orphan School Estate. In 1913, land west of Cabramatta Creek and Orange Grove Road previously owned by the Bull family was subdivided into smaller residential lots by a real estate property salesman named Hugh Pritchard, who named it the Cabramatta Park Estate. From 1919, to honour Mr Pritchard's releasing from debt of a number of landowners whom he'd financed, the estate was renamed Mount Pritchard. The local electoral polling place followed suit in 1924. From the early settler days the general area had been known unofficially as Mount Misery, originally because of a story of one of the early settlers and his family camping there whilst travelling, losing their bullocks, and for three weeks remaining in misery until starvation compelled them to beat a retreat, minus bullocks and dray.

== Demographics ==
At the 2021 census, Mount Pritchard had a population of 10,426. 48.4% of people were born in Australia. The next most common countries of birth were Vietnam 15.9%, Iraq 3.3%, Cambodia 2.9%, New Zealand 1.9% and Lebanon 1.9%. 33.1% of people spoke only English at home. Other languages spoken at home included Vietnamese 22.8%, Arabic 8.2%, Serbian 4.7%, Khmer 3.0% and Cantonese 2.3%. The most common responses for religion were Catholic 23.3%, Buddhism 18.0% and No Religion 17.7%.

The median household income of $1,396 per week was below the national average of $1,746 while the average mortgage repayment of $1,950 per month was above the national average of $1,863 placing the suburb firmly in mortgage belt territory.

== Transport ==
Transit Systems operates three bus route servicing Mount Pritchard:

- 808 Fairfield to Liverpool.
- 815 Mount Pritchard to Cabramatta.
- 816 Greenfield Park (via Meadows Road, Mount Pritchard) to Cabramatta.

The closest railway stations are Cabramatta, Liverpool and Warwick Farm stations.

== Education ==
Mount Pritchard has two government primary schools: Mount Pritchard Public and Mount Pritchard East Public School. There is also the Les Powell School for students with severe intellectual and multiple disabilities.

== Sport and recreation ==
The Mounties Club in Meadows Road, Mount Pritchard supports a number of local teams in various sports, including the Mounties rugby league team in the NSW Cup and the Mounties Wanderers in the National Premier Leagues NSW 2.

Mount Pritchard also has an oval, Mount Pritchard Oval, for the rugby league and football team.

Lions Lookout is a scenic spot that features panoramic views of western Sydney, including the Sydney skyline.
