= Cartwright, New South Wales =

Cartwright
- Suburb
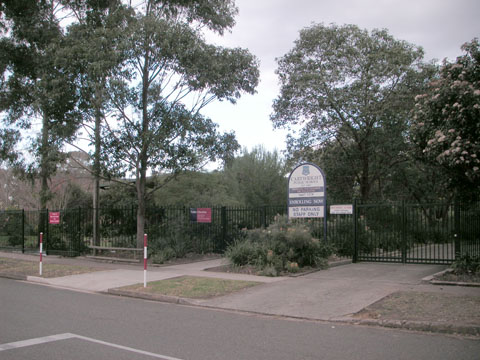
- Cartwright Public School

- Interactive map of Cartwright
- Country: Australia
- State: New South Wales
- City: Sydney
- LGA: City of Liverpool
- Location: 38 km (24 mi) south-west of Sydney
- Established: 1972

Government
  - State electorate: Liverpool
  - Federal division: Werriwa

Population
  - Total: 2,616 (2021 census)
- Postcode: 2168
Suburbs around Cartwright
Miller	Sadleir	Ashcroft
Miller	Cartwright	Liverpool
Prestons	Prestons	Lurnea

Cartwright is a suburb in south-western Sydney, in the state of New South Wales, Australia 38 kilometres south-west of the Sydney central business district, in the local government area of the City of Liverpool.

== Geography ==
It is bounded by the suburbs of Prestons, Miller, Ashcroft, Sadleir, Lurnea and Liverpool. Housing in the area is a combination of houses, newly built duplexes and flats. Cabramatta Creek forms the northern (Ashcroft/Sadleir) and west boundary (Miller), Maxwells Creek the east boundary (Liverpool), and Hoxton Park Rd the south boundary (Prestons/Lurnea). There is an extensive network of shared pathways interconnecting the many cul-de-sacs present in the area. A bridge also links it to Miller, crossing over Cabramatta Creek. Liverpool City BMX Club also has its grounds in Powell Park. There is also McGirr Park in the north-east.

== History ==
Cartwright was officially declared a suburb in 1972 and was developed as part of the Green Valley Housing Estate in the 1960s. It was named after Robert Cartwright who was the reverend of St Luke's Church in Liverpool and who received a land grant in the local area.

== Education ==
Cartwright Public School was opened in 1967. The local high school is Miller Technology High School.

== Transport ==
It is served by bus services T80, along the dedicated bus T-Way, operated by Transit Systems as are routes 802 and 803. Transit Systems operates bus routes 853 and 854.

The nearest rail station is Liverpool, on the T2 Leppington and T3 Liverpool & Inner West Lines.

The main arterial road is Hoxton Park Road, leading to the Hume Highway in the east, connecting to Cowpasture Rd in the west. Cartwright Ave also feeds into smaller streets serving the rest of the suburb.

== Demographics ==
According to the 2021 census, there were 6,741 residents in Cartwright. 67.67% of people were born in Australia. The most common other countries of birth were Iraq 9.4%, Vietnam 6.7%, Lebanon 4.0%, New Zealand 2.3% and Fiji 1.6%. In Cartwright 37.3% of people only spoke English at home. Other languages spoken at home included Arabic 22.1%, Vietnamese 9.1%, Samoan 2.6%, Spanish 1.8% and Khmer 1.3%. The most common responses for religion in Cartwright were Islam 19.7%, Catholic 16.6% and No Religion 14.6%.
