= Green Valley Creek (Sydney) =

Stream in Australia

Coordinates: 33°52′41″S 150°55′52″E

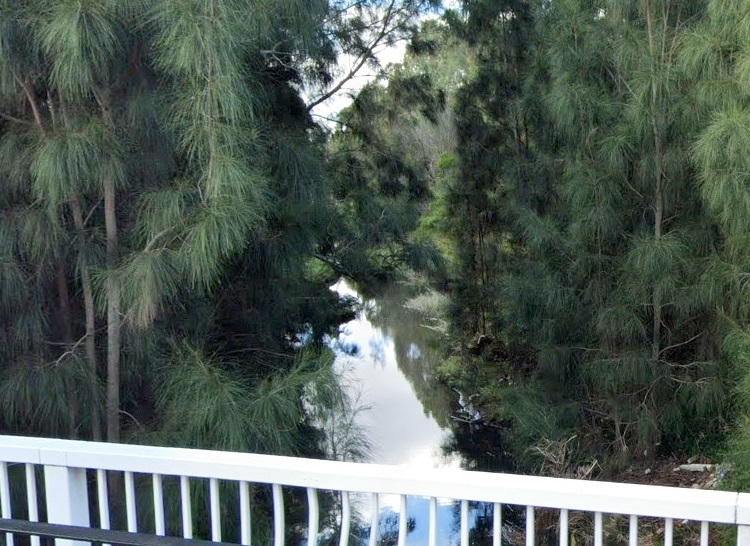
- The creek, surrounded by Casuarina glauca (she-oaks)

Location
- Country: Australia
- State: New South Wales
- Region: Sydney Basin (IBRA), Greater Western Sydney
- LGAs: Fairfield

Physical characteristics
- Source: North Liverpool Road and Horton Street
  - location: Mount Pritchard
  - elevation: 49 m (161 ft)
- Mouth: Orphan School Creek
  - location: Near Endeavor Sports Park, Canley Heights
- Length: 7 km (4.3 mi)
- Width
  - average: 4 m (13 ft)
- Depth
  - average: 1 m (3.3 ft)

Basin features
- River system: Sydney Basin catchment
- Dam / Reservoir: Prospect Reservoir

Green Valley Creek is a stream situated in Western Sydney, New South Wales, Australia. A tributary of Orphan School Creek, the creek is one of the five significant creeks that are found within the Fairfield City Council LGA.

== Course ==
Green Valley Creek is piped upstream of North Liverpool Road and is generally subterranean around this area, with reedy natural channels. Though it travels downstream within a riparian waterway for approximately 7 kilometres (4.3 mi) to its confluence with Orphan School Creek. Having a 7.4-square-kilometre (1,800-acre) catchment area, the creek traverses Bonnyrigg, St Johns Park, Cabramatta West and Canley Heights, where it meets the Orphan School Creek at Endeavor Sports Park to the east (just south of Fairfield West).

Around St Johns Road, Green Valley Creek becomes relatively narrow and shallow, giving this section of the watercourse a brook-like appearance. Farther downstream, towards Chisholm Park in Canley Heights, the creek becomes increasingly marshy and reedy, with intermittent surface flow that increases following heavy rainfall, although small streams of water may persist irregularly along its course. There is a minor level of flood interaction and backwater at the Orphan School Creek/Green Valley Creek confluence, which can affect low-laying areas, as minor flood spill had occurred in Edensor Road at Edensor Park.

Parks and reserves on its bushy strip include, from west to east: Lalich Park, Barook Reserve, Crosio Park, Homebush Park, Chisholm Park and Endeavour Sports Park (here it is where the creek meets with Orphan School Creek).

== Bush restoration ==
The original vegetation on the floodplains that bounded these creek was the River-flat eucalypt forest and Coastal Swamp Oak Forest, which were vastly cleared as Sydney's metropolitan area grew larger and is now listed as an endangered community. Within the past few decades, Fairfield Council has been restoring the riparian vegetation near the creek, with a 2019 regeneration project been conducted at Barook Park, where over 4,700 plants were planted within the Green Valley Creek corridor.

== Crime ==
In May 2022, the creek gained local notoriety after a body of an 18 year old girl, who had been missing for a month, was discovered on its streambed.

== See also ==
- Orphan School Creek (Fairfield)
- Prospect Creek
- Georges River
- Clear Paddock Creek
