= Edensor Creek =

Creek in Greater Western Sydney, Australia

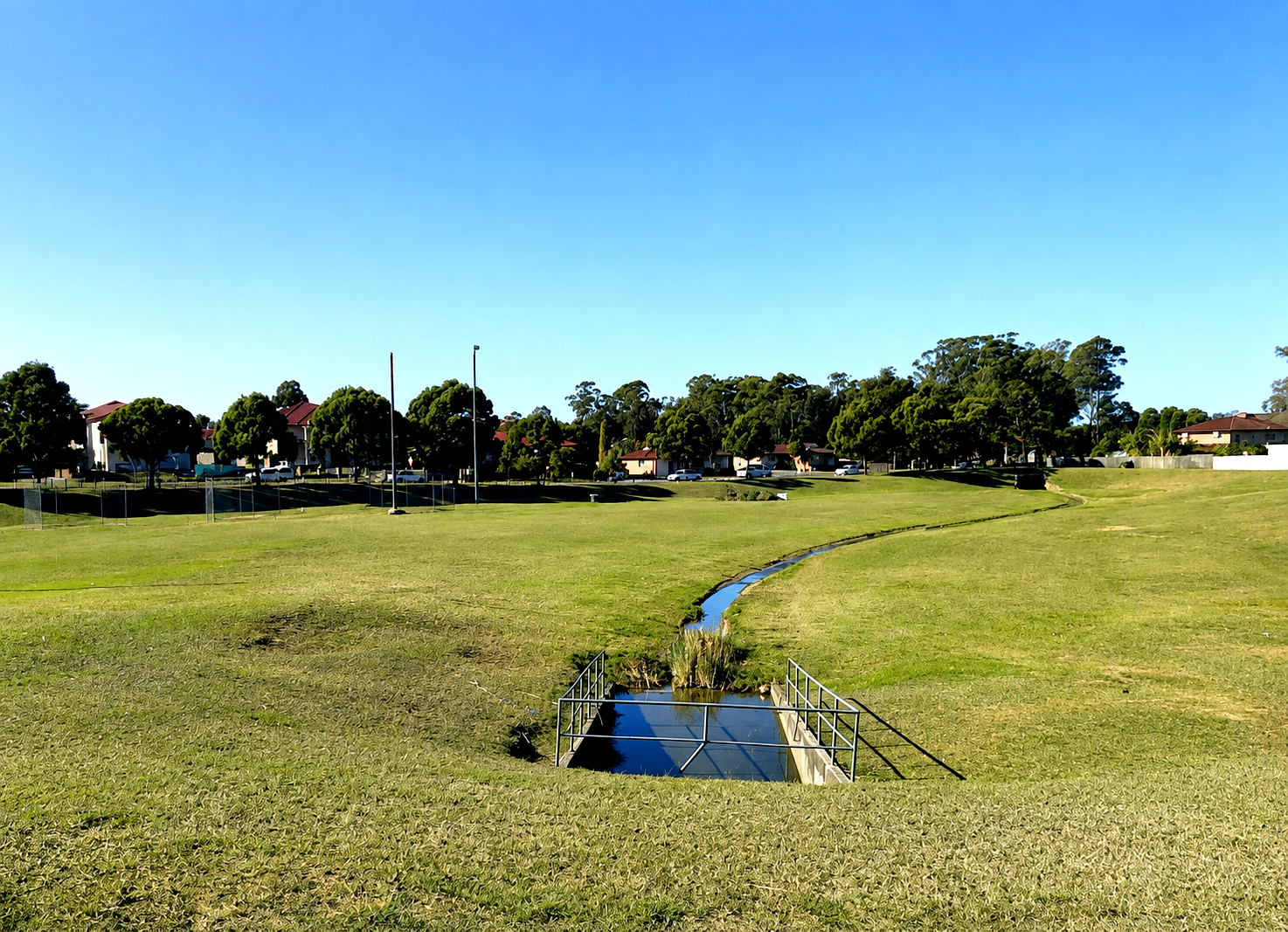
- Edensor Creek at Bosnjak Park, Edensor Park

Location
- Country: Australia
- State: New South Wales
- Region: Sydney Basin (IBRA), Greater Western Sydney
- LGA: Fairfield

Physical characteristics
- Source: near Kalang Road
  - location: Edensor Park
  - coordinates: 33°52′47″S 150°52′11″E
- Mouth: Clear Paddock Creek
  - location: south of Smithfield Road, Greenfield Park
  - coordinates: 33°52′57″S 150°53′29″E
- Length: 1.9 km (1.2 mi)

Basin features
- Progression: Clear Paddock Creek → Orphan School Creek → Prospect Creek → Georges River → Botany Bay
- River system: Georges River

Edensor Creek is a small suburban brook in Greater Western Sydney, New South Wales, Australia. Located within the City of Fairfield, the creek is 1.9 km (1.2 mi) long and is a tributary of Clear Paddock Creek, forming part of the Prospect Creek and Georges River catchment.

== Course and characteristics ==
Edensor Creek rises near Kalang Road in Edensor Park and flows generally eastwards for approximately 1.9 km (1.2 mi). Near its downstream end, Edensor Creek briefly enters Greenfield Park, where its open channel terminates near the intersection of Smithfield Road and Edensor Road. From there, the creek is conveyed underground before flowing into Clear Paddock Creek. It is one of three small, predominantly natural waterways, along with Wilson Creek and Henty Creek, that form the upper portion of the Clear Paddock Creek catchment.

Much of Edensor Creek consists of a narrow open channel surrounded by a vegetated corridor. Some sections occupy a shallow, marshy gullies that are generally dry and fill with water following periods of heavy rainfall. The creek passes through Bosnjak Park, where a small flood-retarding basin is situated along the watercourse. The Upstream Basin is a flood-control structure constructed on the watercourse. The basin is listed by the New South Wales Government as a declared dam on Edensor Creek at Edensor Park. Near Smithfield Road, part of the creek is conveyed through an underground pipe as part of the local stormwater drainage system. The creek and its surrounding drainage network have been included in flood modelling undertaken for the Clear Paddock Creek catchment.

== Environment ==
Edensor Creek forms a vegetated waterway through the otherwise highly urbanised landscape of Edensor Park. Its riparian corridor includes areas of remnant and restored native vegetation and provides a habitat connection through the local catchment. Fairfield City Council has undertaken environmental restoration along Edensor Creek, including works at Anglevale and Busby reserves. These have included the planting of indigenous trees, shrubs and groundcovers to improve the condition of the creek and its surrounding riparian vegetation. The project includes approximately 18,000 plants and is expected to establish about one hectare of additional tree canopy along 400 m (1,300 ft) of shared pathways.

The creek has also been used by Fairfield City Council for environmental education, including guided walks focusing on its biodiversity, vegetation and the historical management of creek lines within the Fairfield area.

== See also ==
- Clear Paddock Creek
- Orphan School Creek (Fairfield)
- Prospect Creek (New South Wales)
- List of rivers of New South Wales (A–K)
