= BPHS =

BPHS or bphs may refer to:

- Bṛhat Parāśara Horāśāstra, a foundational compilation of Indian astrology
- Bands per haploid set, number of bands seen in a haploid set in cytogenetics

== Schools ==
- Baldwin Park High School, Baldwin Park, California, United States
- Banksia Park International High School, Adelaide, South Australia, Australia
- Benson Polytechnic High School, Portland, Oregon, United States
- Bethel Park High School, Bethel Park, Pennsylvania, United States
- Bossley Park High School, Bossley Park, New South Wales, Australia
- Brooke Point High School, Stafford, Virginia, United States
- Buena Park High School, Orange County, California, United States
