= Clear Paddock Creek =

Creek in Fairfield, New South Wales, Australia

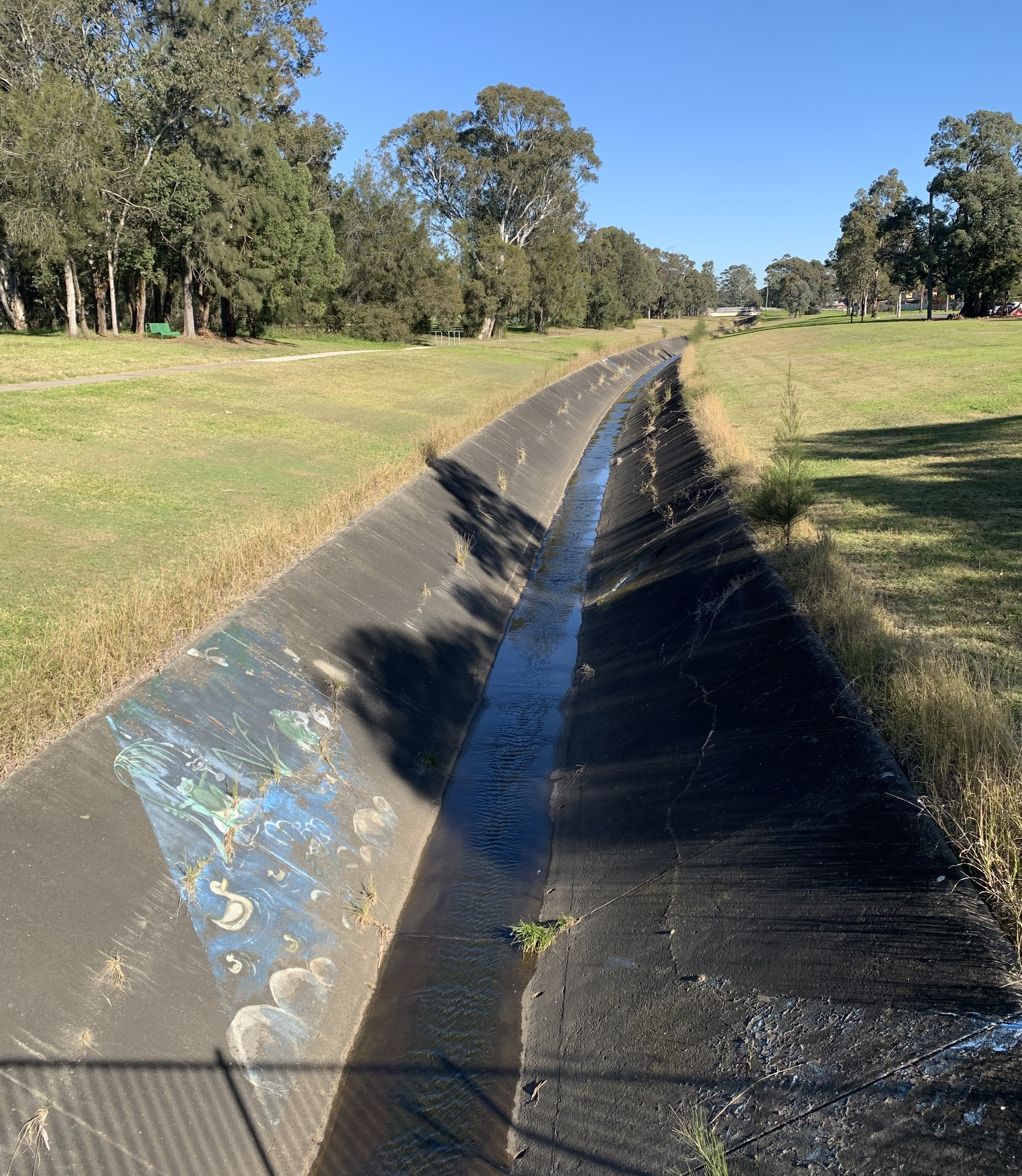
- The creek flowing near Burns Road at Burns Park

Location
- Country: Australia
- State: New South Wales
- Region: Sydney Basin (IBRA), Greater Western Sydney
- LGAs: Fairfield

Physical characteristics
- Source: North Liverpool Road, near Whitford Road
  - location: Bonnyrigg/Green Valley border
- 2nd source: Clear Paddock Basin
  - location: Bonnyrigg
- Mouth: confluence with Prospect Creek
  - location: below King Road, Wakeley
- Length: 6.5 km (4.0 mi)

Basin features
- River system: Georges River
- Tributaries
  - left: Edensor Creek
- Dam / Reservoir: Prospect Reservoir

Clear Paddock Creek is an urban watercourse in Western Sydney, New South Wales, Australia, and a tributary of Orphan School Creek within the Prospect Creek catchment. Located in the City of Fairfield, New South Wales, Australia, the creek starts from Bonnyrigg near North Liverpool Road and ends at Orphan School Creek to the east near King Road in Fairfield West.

Situated in Western Sydney on the Cumberland Plain, the creek is concrete-walled east of Brisbane Road to the convergence with Orphan School Creek at northeast, though a naturalised section of the creek called "Restoring the Waters" begins just west of Brisbane Road at Edensor Park, and southwest of that point the creek remains natural with a reedy riparian zone. For public access, the transitway bus network crosses several sections near the creek.

== History ==
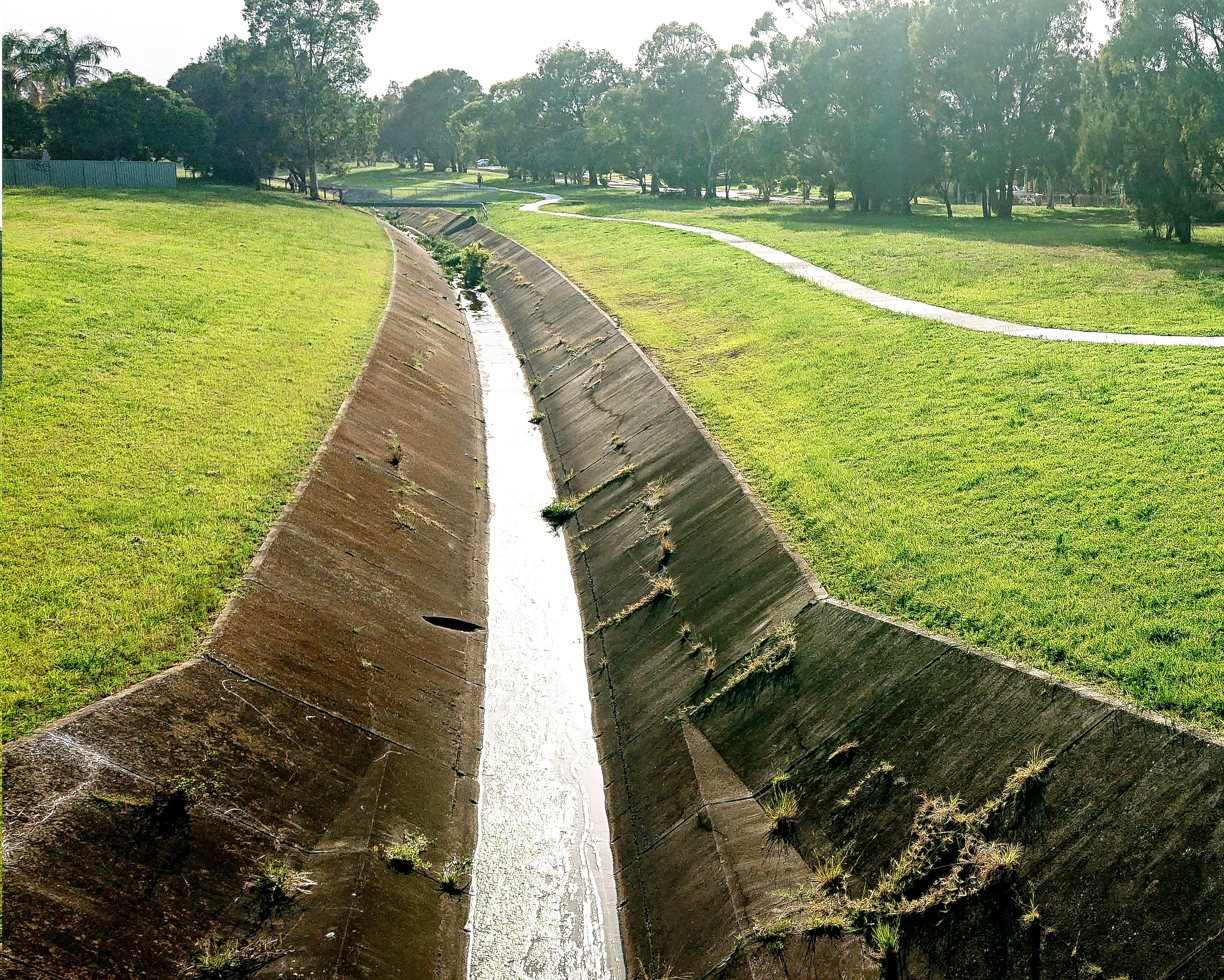
A recreational walkway meanders the creek

Stone artifacts belonging to the Darug people, who are indigenous to southwest Sydney, have been found on the creek's banks, and are thousands of years old. Today, the vegetal banks of the creek are an important place for storytelling and community arts. The creek was a source of freshwater, fish, eels and shellfish for the local Aboriginal Australians.

Like most creeks in the Georges River catchment area, Clear Paddock Creek was a series of ponds and gullies rather than a continuous stream, before the banks were disturbed by the European settlers. Wild fennel and chicory growing through the creek's banks are remnants of the early European farmers in the St Johns Park area. Its name suggests that the creek meandered through a cleared paddock of an early farm in the area.

In 1995, it was announced that the concrete-lined creek will be turned into the natural creek it once was, though only a small portion of it was reestablished as such – In 1996, the project rejuvenated the 500 metres (1,600 ft) long section of the concrete storm water drain to a natural living stream featuring a riparian buffer. This site, which is just west of Brisbane Road Bridge in Bonnyrigg, became known as "Restoring the Waters" in 2001, and earned the council an international environmental award.

== Geography ==
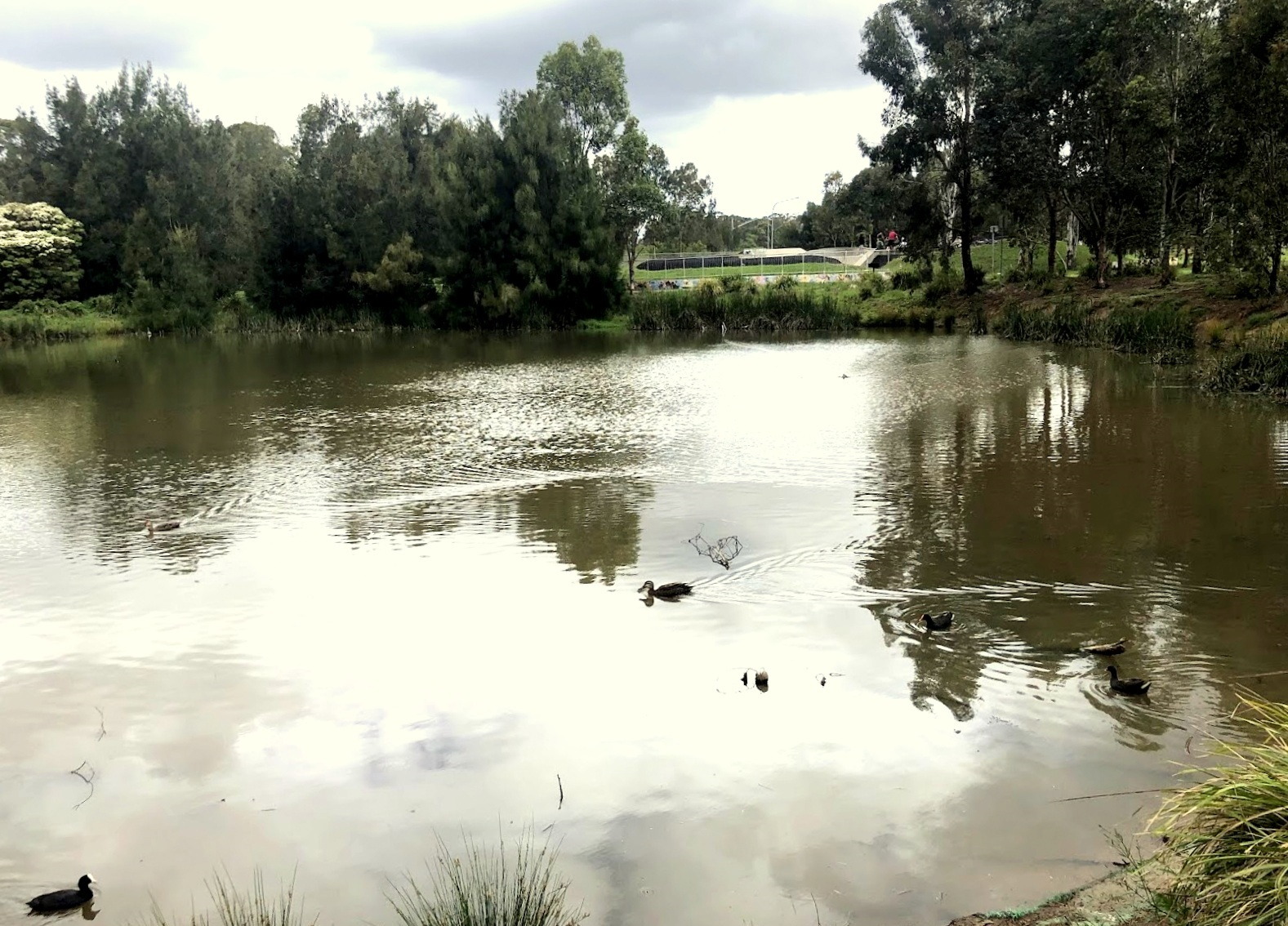
Clear Paddock Basin in Bonnyrigg, one of the creek's sources

Clear Paddock Creek is encompassed by a grassy terrain and eucalypts and has a catchment area of 8.8 square kilometres (3.4 mi^{2}). At the upstream end of the creek (in Edensor Park) three smaller natural waterways called Edensor, Wilson and Henty Creeks (which are still labeled as 'Clear Paddock Creek' on maps) flow into the main channel of the creek at a naturalised part named "Restoring the Waters", which transformed a former concrete stormwater channel into a more natural stream with riparian vegetation. Flood surges above the downstream basin fence of Kalang Road Basin, where it flows down Smithfield Road. Road crossings at Smithfield Road, Brown Road and Simpson Road can be overflowed in a 20 year ARI (Average Recurrence Interval). Parts of the Bus Transitway at the Edensor Road junction can be flood affected.

South of Brown Road in Bonnyrigg Heights, the upper reaches of Clear Paddock Creek continue as Henty Creek, which is a small brook. Henty Creek flows through a shallow, heavily vegetated and marshy channel that is largely dry during periods of low rainfall, with more substantial surface flow occurring following rain. Henty Place Reserve, Diamond Crescent Reserve, Brown Reserve, Gregorace Reserve, Bonnyrigg Town Centre Park, Nineveh Stadium (part of Eden Venues reception club), King Park, Burns Park, St Johns Park (with the adjacent bowling club) and Hampshire Reserve are contiguous recreational areas that are present on the creek's strip, all featuring a shared cycleway/walkway. They also adjoin the nature strip of Orphan School Creek to the north and east.

=== Course ===
The creek is a linear wetland that flows north from North Liverpool Road at the border of Bonnyrigg and Green Valley, parallel of the Liverpool-Parramatta Rapid Bus Transitway, which then heads to Clear Paddock Basin at the Bonnyrigg/Edensor Park boundary, just near Smithfield Road. Before reaching the Basin it is intermittent, only filling up after substantial rainfall. The creek then turns its course north-east from Edensor Road, becoming concrete-walled, before emptying into Orphan School Creek in Wakeley. To the south of Clear Paddock Basin, the creek becomes subterranean or tunnelled, where it flows underground in a southwesterly direction to the northeastern fringes of Green Valley. It is approximately 6.5 kilometres (4.0 mi) in length, although Fairfield City Council lists it as 5 kilometres (3.1 mi) long. The naturalised section of Clear Paddock Creek has a narrow, shallow and meandering channel with pools and riffles, giving it a brook-like appearance.

Clear Paddock Creek features a small tributary on its western side called Edensor Creek, which is mostly a natural waterway and gully. Edensor Creek begins at Kalang Road in the west, in Edensor Park, and ends at Smithfield Road in the east, in Greenfield Park, where it flows into Clear Paddock Creek. Edensor Creek flows through recreational areas such as Anglevale Reserve, Busby Park, Bosnjak Park, and Chickasaw Crescent Reserve. At Bosnjak Park, there is a small embankment dam that forms part of Edensor Creek.

== Restoration ==
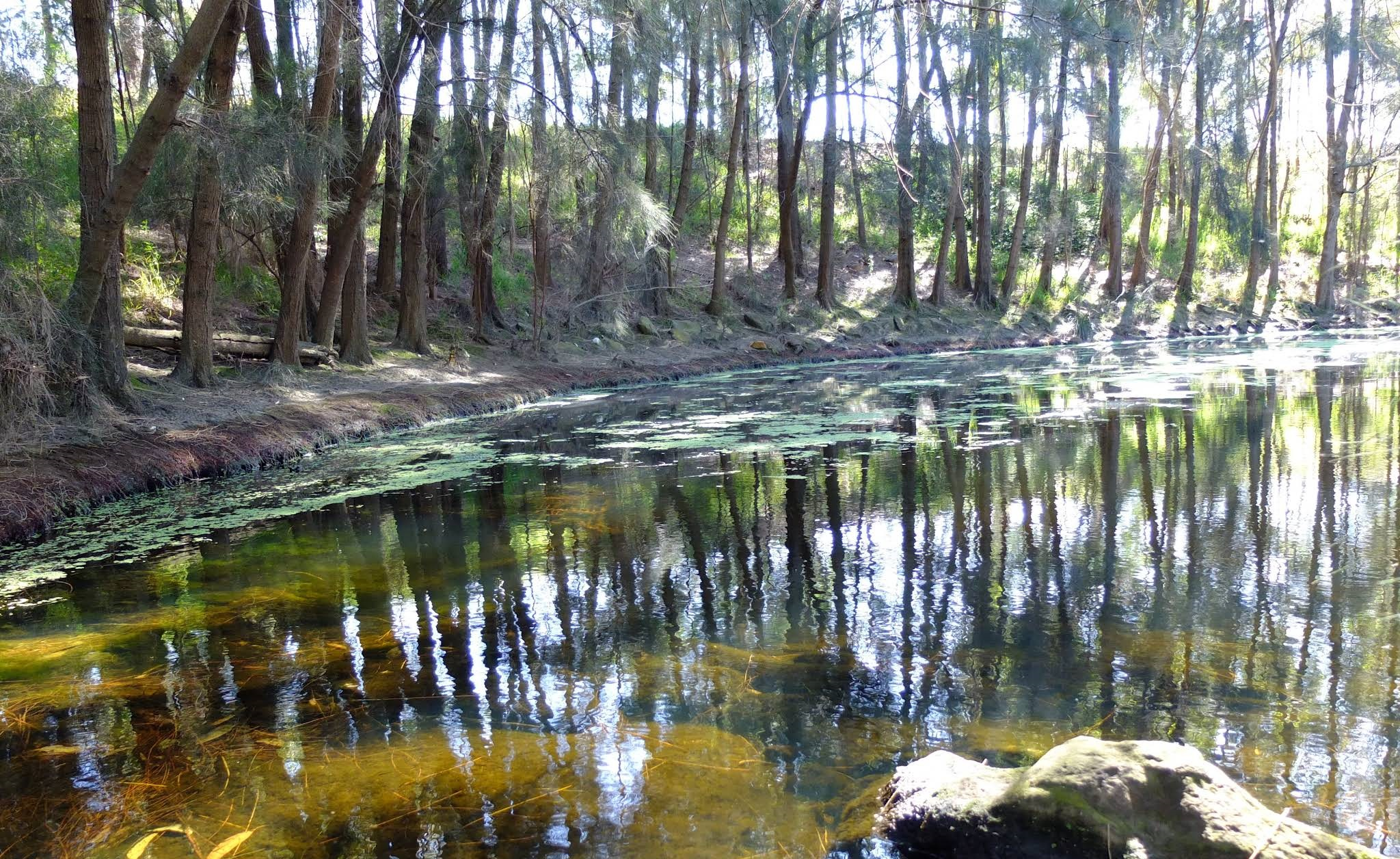
"Restoring the Waters" section with restored vegetation

The restored natural creek ecosystem ("Restoring the Waters" area), which lies west of Brisbane Road, features typical riparian vegetation and resembles the original Coastal Swamp Oak Forest that predominantly has species like Casuarina glauca. The creek's original water flows were advantageously sidetracked from an engineered structure to a natural system. Therefore, in the process a creek and urban floodplain developed the cornerstone of a restored local park that implements a complete catchment management standards.

A major detention basin was constructed in 2004 in the Bonnyrigg area. The creek has been served as a living laboratory that examines new landscape and bioengineering technologies as tenable alternatives to the establishment of concrete channels and conventional drainage infrastructure. A mixture of Gross Pollutant Traps (GPTs) were established on all stormwater pipes that join the rejuvenated section of the creek, which include a floating litter boom with a loaded skirt, stormwater traps, and litter baskets. Around 26,660 aquatic plants were planted at the bottom of the banks, thereby supplying bank stabilisation and thus decreasing potential erosion and subsequent sedimentation of the new watercourse.

The riparian zone at Brown Reserve (on Brown Road, Bonnyrigg) is densely vegetated with old arborescent weeds and vines, though it also features remnant vegetation of River-flat eucalypt forest, with the rare species such as Acacia pubescens. To prevent erosion in the riparian areas, by the help of Fairfield City Council, over 19,000 native plants will be planted from 2025 to support native plant regeneration, whilst removing invasive weeds.

== Crossings ==
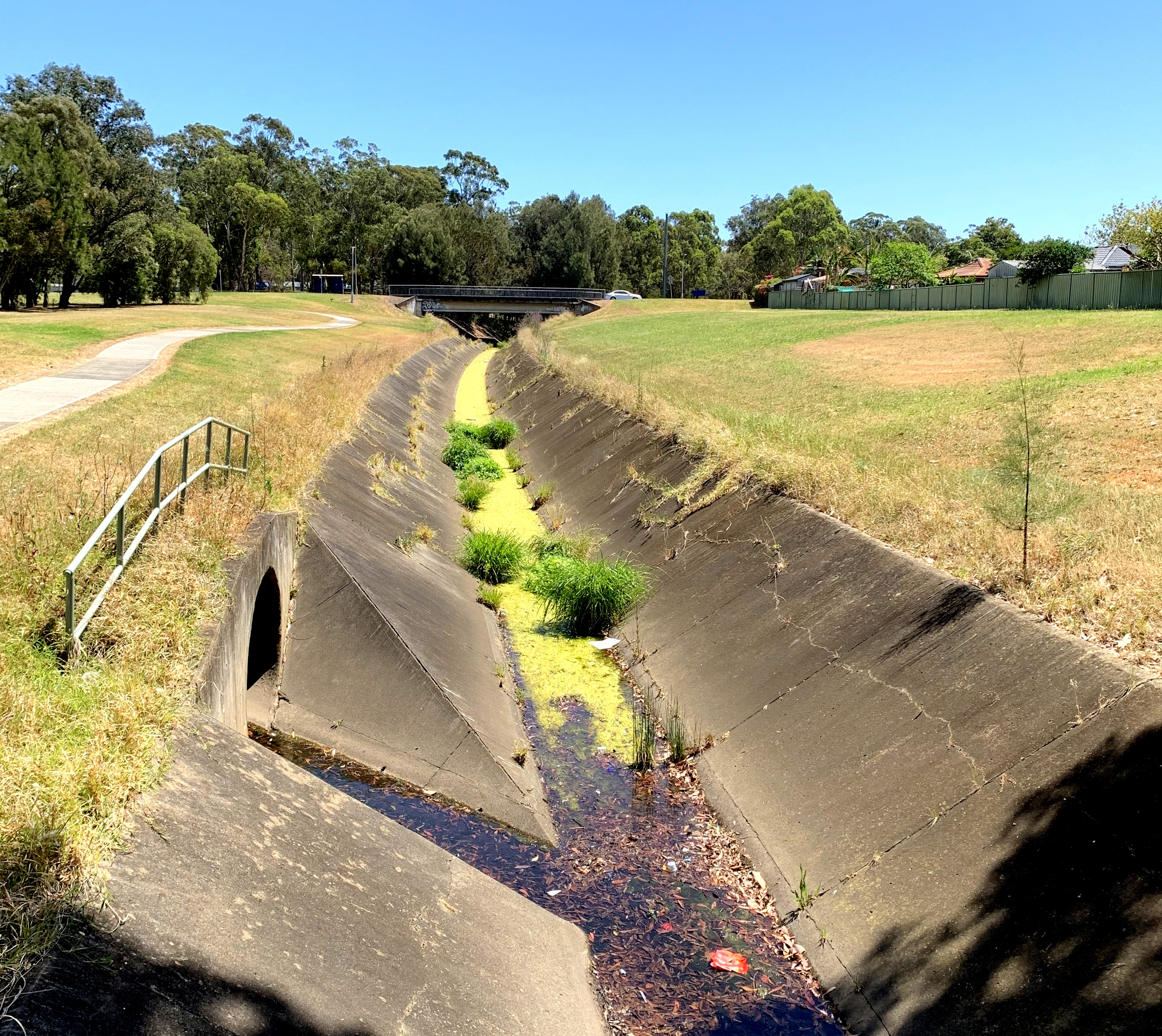
The creek in a dry period

The following roads and transit ways form crossings over Orphan School Creek. From east to west, they are:

- Kembla Street
- Canley Vale Road
- Canberra Street
- Brisbane Road
- Liverpool–Parramatta Rapid Bus Transitway
- Elizabeth Drive
- Brown Road
- North Liverpool Road
- Whitford Road

== See also ==
- Orphan School Creek (Fairfield)
- Prospect Creek
- Georges River
