= Fairfield Showground =

Multi purpose venue in Sydney, New South Wales

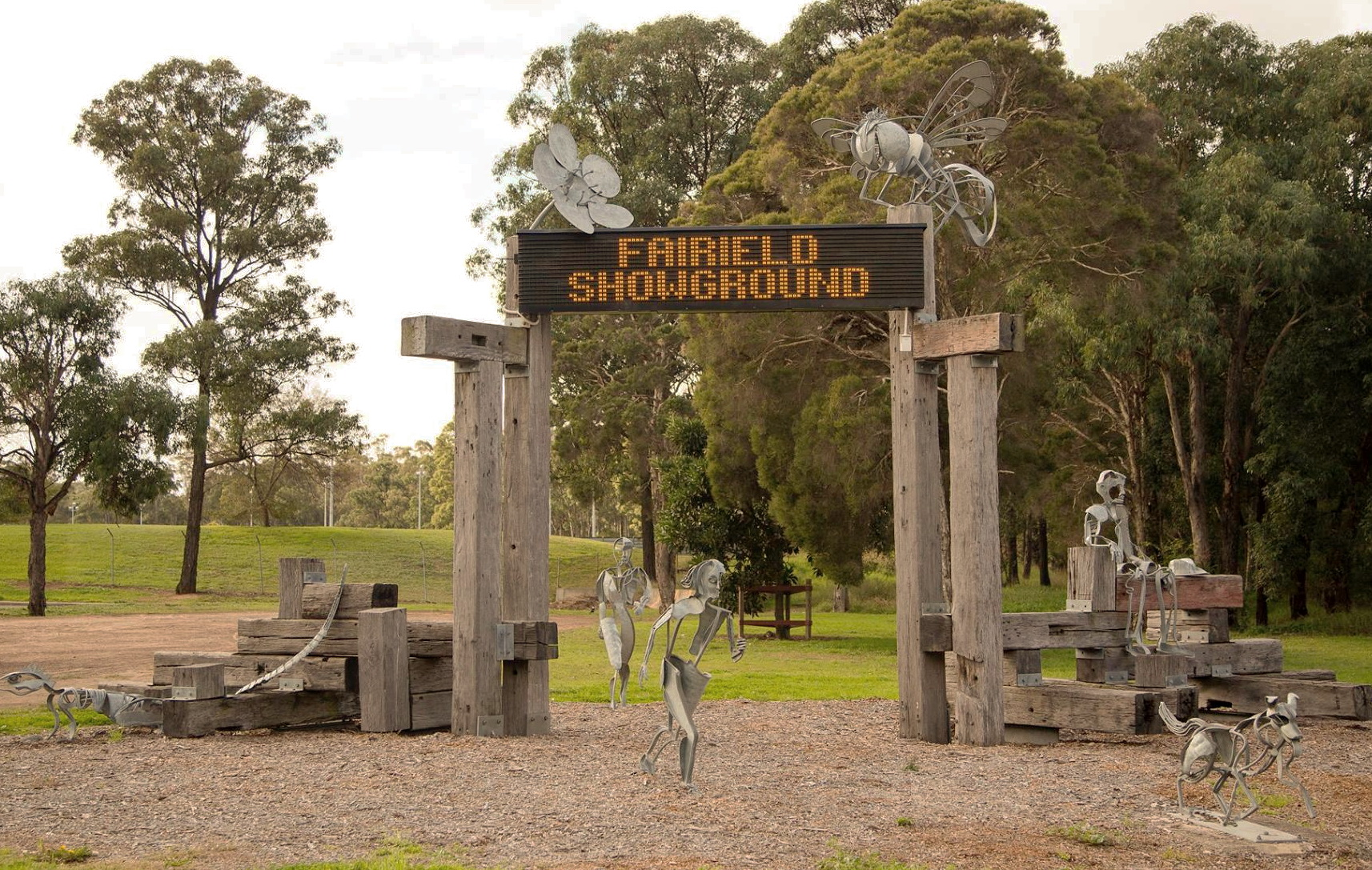
- Interactive map of Fairfield Showground
- Location: 443 Smithfield Road, Prairiewood
- Coordinates: 33°52′00″S 150°54′20″E
- Owner: Fairfield City Council
- Surface: Indoor and outdoor 2020 (Artificial turf for football venue)

Construction
- Opened: 1950s 2020 (Opening of football venue)

Tenants
- Macarthur FC (A-League) and Northbridge Bulls (NPL NSW) training facility, (2021–present)

Website
- Official Website

Fairfield Showground is a multi-purpose indoor-outdoor venue situated in Prairiewood, New South Wales, Australia. Since in the 1970s, it has been a popular venue for multicultural festivals, horse racing, carnivals, markets and club meets attracting as many as 20,000 people. Situated in western Sydney, the showground has around 10,000 sqm of undercover exhibition space and it is overall 33 hectares (79 acres) in size, with parking spaces for over 600 vehicles.

One of the largest festival precinct in Greater Western Sydney, the showground was developed in the 1950s and is surrounded by eucalyptus bushland, with Orphan School Creek meandering on the north.

== Markets ==
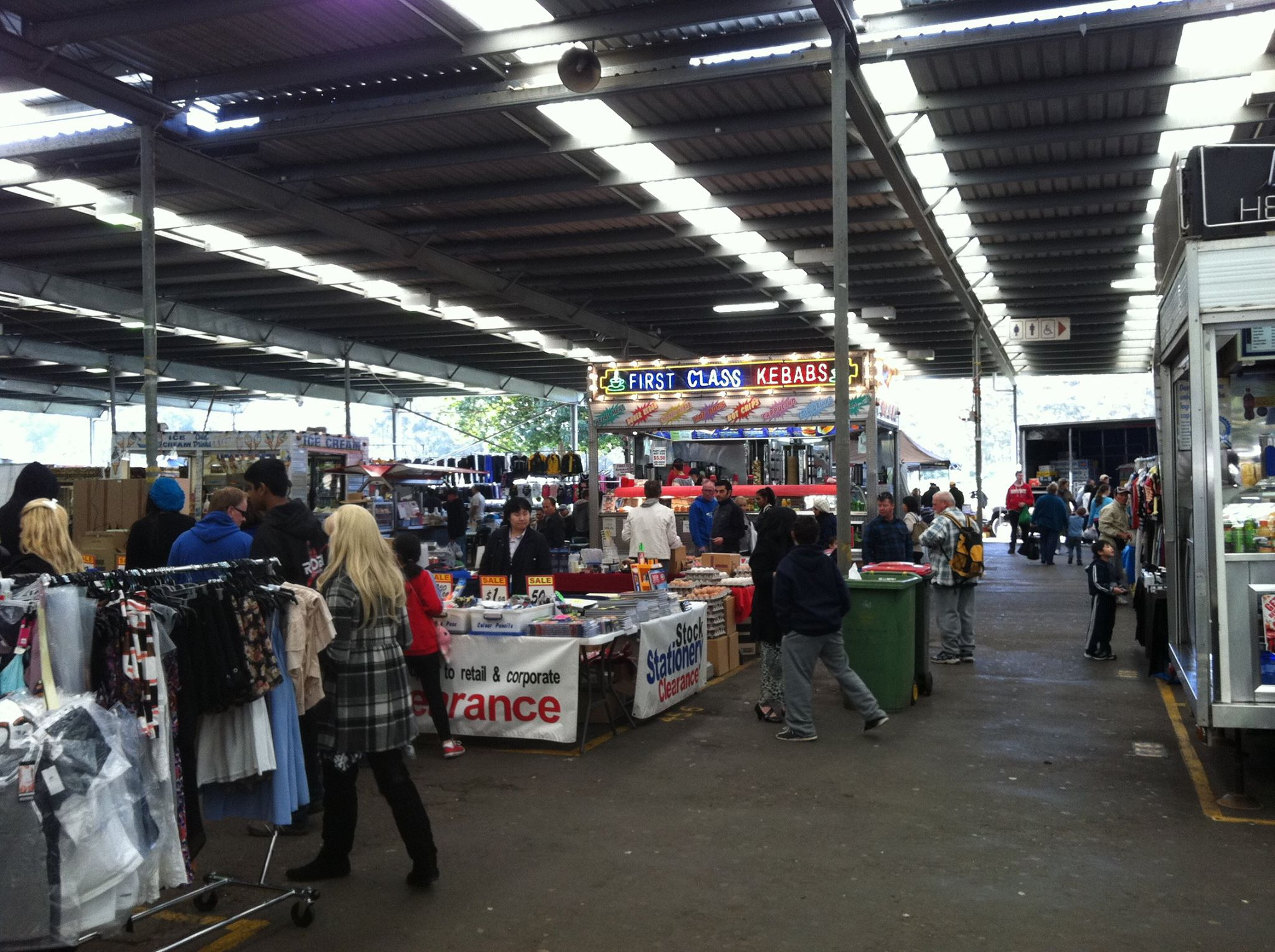
Saturday markets.

Markets are held at Fairfield Showground every Saturday from 9am to 4pm in the sheltered area behind the grandstands. The markets are a popular attraction, with space for 600+ stalls, free entry, food & drink stands and thousands of visitors every weekend. The markets include of toy stores, food booths, dollar stores, sporting gear shops, grocery, hardware, gardening, jewelry, and pet supplies. Additional market nights have been held irregularly. These have included Aussie Night Markets on Tuesday once per month, with the primary interest being the large number of international cuisine on offer, such as Turkish, Korean, Chinese and Mexican with over 40 multicultural street foods and dessert vendors, 20 craft stores, DJ performances, and also a boutique retail section. The markets were closed down periodically during the COVID-19 pandemic.

Entertainment is also provided for children on most weekends. This can include pony rides, merry-go-round, clown heads, a jumping castle, and a mini-train ride system which circulates the bushy surroundings.

== Facilities ==
The Parklands Function Centre is used for engagement parties, wedding receptions, anniversaries, school reunions and award presentation nights for up to 250 people. Adjacent to the Showground is the 18-hole Fairfield public golf course. The function centre was used as a central hub for Fairfield's 2021 Local Council elections.

A harness racing track and club was located on the grounds from late 1964 through to June 2017 when it closed & was demolished to facilitate the large redevelopment. It had ceased full time racing operations in 2004.

Deerbush Park Playground is situated adjacent to the Smithfield Rd carpark of the showgrounds. Opening in 2021 and replacing an older seated area that had a minimal playground of swing sets and slippery dips. It is built in consideration of the older eucalypt trees in the surrounding area that provide shade in the park as well as habitat for various local wildlife. The park contains an array of built in play activities including: climbing ropes and a net course, flying fox, learn-to-ride track, climbing net fort with slide, an accessible riverbed crossing, a water pump and assorted water play activities, sand digger, and voice tubes. There are also various fixed outdoor percussion play musical instruments such as babel drums and chimes. Disability consideration also comes in the form of large liberty swings that allow children in wheelchairs to swing safely, along with wheelchair-accessible carousel and a ground-level trampoline.

== Redevelopment ==
From 2017 onwards the site was significantly redeveloped. In a joint commitment by Fairfield Council, the NSW Government, and the Federal Government, the $28 million redevelopment of the Showground includes three large playing fields, two for rectangular football and one for Australian rules football. The main pitch is a FIFA-accredited synthetic field, with the training pitch a regulation turf field. A sports training facility was built in between the three fields, and with the two main football fields complete, the Showgrounds have been used as the training base for A-League club Macarthur FC and an alternate ground for the Marconi Stallions FC with Marconi Stadium being a FIFA Women's World Cup 2023 training venue.

Fairfield City Council has announced that the facilities would be available for any Sydney bid to host the Commonwealth Games. Frank Carbone has said Fairfield Showground should be included in any Games proposal saying, “We are looking at investing almost $10 million into the showground, and also seeking more funding for further upgrades”. The intent to host the 2026 or 2030 Games in Greater Western Sydney was put to Premier Gladys Berejiklian and Sports Minister Stuart Ayres.

== COVID Testing ==
The showground made national news headlines in July 2021 after a COVID-19 testing clinic and a vaccination hub were opened in its premises. The area had been a hotspot for cases as well as significant testing demand due to the NSW Government's locality based mandatory testing regime. As a drive in testing facility with limited road access, traffic was backed up for multiple kilometres with waiting times up of to 6 hours. Demand eased when an additional facility was opened at the Endeavour Sports Park, 3 kilometres east of the Showground.

== Culture ==
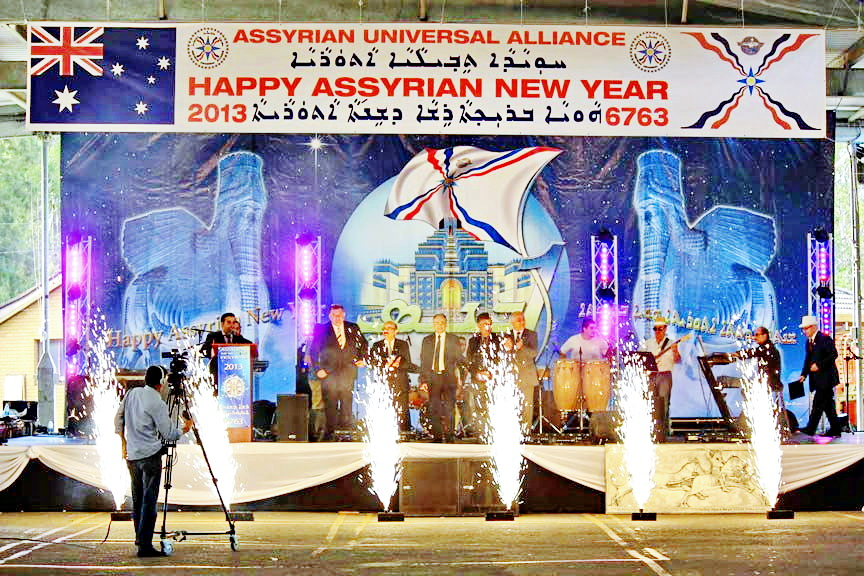
The annually held Assyrian New Year festival.

Assyrian Australians celebrate the Assyrian New Year annually on 1 April, in Fairfield Showground. Thousands attend the New Year festival and it usually features music and theatrical performances, traditional dancers, food stalls and fireworks. Former Australian prime minister Tony Abbott and other politicians such as Chris Bowen, Craig Kelly, Tanya Plibersek, Chris Hayes and former NSW premier Bob Carr have attended the festival and made a speech. The Assyrian Australian Latin pop band Azadoota regularly performs in the annual festival.

The showground is also home to the Australia's first, largest and longest-running Eid Festival, which commenced in 1987. The festival has grown to now cater for tens of thousands of Muslims and non-Muslims and has included as guests Yusuf Islam, famous Australian footballer, Hazem El Masri, the then Governor-General of Australia, Michael Jeffery and the previous Premier of New South Wales, Kristina Keneally.

The Chinese New Year is annually celebrated in the showground with over 60,000 people attending. More than 40,000 people attend the annual Vietnamese New Year, which is held for three days from Friday to Sunday. Both feature fireworks, amusement rides and cultural performances such as dragon dancing.

The Fairfield Easter Fair is held at the showground and has featured amusement rides such as Bumper cars, a blacksmith exhibition, farm animals, easter egg hunt, sheep shearing, reptile shows and fireworks. A Uruguayan festival, which has been running for nearly three decades and raised $2 million of charity, features hundreds of performers and live music acts, is held annually on August and it's one of the biggest outdoor Latin festivals in Sydney's West.

Furthermore, international artists such as AC/DC have performed in the venue in 1975, playing songs from their debut album High Voltage.

== Access ==
The Liverpool–Parramatta T-way has a station close to the showground, as well as a number of encircling bus stops that belong to Transit Systems. Although the main entry is from Smithfield Road, there is another entrance to the showground from Moonlight Road, on the head of Greenfield Road, to the west, which feature a sign indicating the showground's entry.

== See also ==
- Stockland Wetherill Park, a nearby mall
