= Ricardo Rizzo =

Australian soccer player

Personal information
- Full name: Ricardo Rizzo Trejo
- Date of birth: 29 August 2000 (age 26)
- Place of birth: Prairiewood, Sydney, Australia
- Height: 1.83 m (6 ft 0 in)
- Position: Goalkeeper

Team information
- Current team: Rockdale Ilinden
- Number: 20

Youth career
- Mounties Wanderers
- 2015: Parramatta FC
- 2015–2016: Mt Druitt Town Rangers

Senior career*
Years	Team	Apps	(Gls)
2017	SD Raiders	4	(0)
2018–2019	FCV Stamford	0	(0)
2019	→ Holbeach United (loan)	1	(0)
2020–2021	Cerro	1	(0)
2021–2022	Central Coast Mariners	0	(0)
2022	CCM Academy	5	(0)
2022	Hills United	14	(0)
2023–	Rockdale Ilinden	19	(0)
- * Club domestic league appearances and goals as of 6 December 2024

Ricardo Rizzo (born 29 August 2000) is an Australian footballer who plays as a goalkeeper for Rockdale Ilinden .
