= Canley Heights =

- Suburb
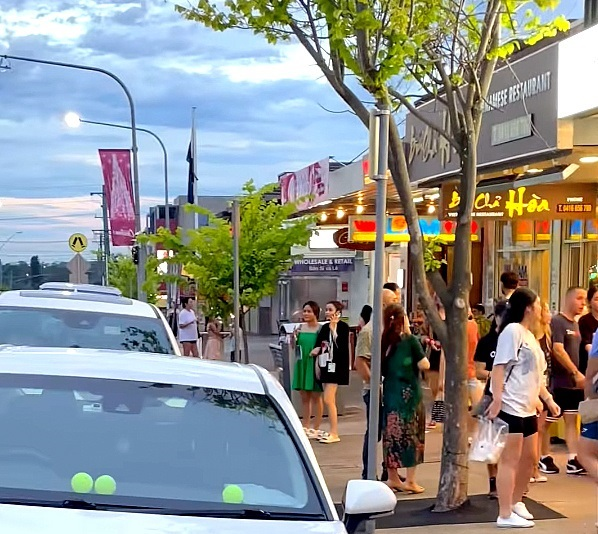
- The storefronts on Canley Vale Road, the main street

- Interactive map of Canley Heights
- Country: Australia
- State: New South Wales
- City: Sydney
- LGA: City of Fairfield
- Location: 31 km (19 mi) west of Sydney CBD

Government
  - State electorate: Fairfield
  - Federal division: Fowler

Area
  - Total: 2.6 km^{2} (1.0 sq mi)
- Elevation: 25 m (82 ft)

Population
  - Total: 12,320 (2021 census)
  - Density: 4,740/km^{2} (12,270/sq mi)
- Postcode: 2166
Suburbs around Canley Heights
| Wakeley | Fairfield West | Canley Vale |
| Wakeley | Canley Heights | Canley Vale |
| St Johns Park | Cabramatta West | Cabramatta |

Canley Heights is a suburb of Sydney, in the state of New South Wales, Australia 31 kilometres west of the Sydney central business district, in the local government area of the City of Fairfield and is part of the South-western Sydney region.

== History ==
The Cabramatta Creek system, which borders the suburb, formed an important part of the Darug landscape, providing food, water and travel routes across the Cumberland Plain. European land grants in the early 19th century initiated the area's transformation from Aboriginal Country into an agricultural landscape, which was later developed into the residential suburb that exists today. Canley Heights takes its name from its sister suburb down the hill, Canley Vale. When Sir Henry Parkes settled there in the mid-19th century, he named his home Canley Grange, after his birthplace of Canley in Coventry, England.

Throughout the 19th and early 20th centuries, the area that became Canley Heights formed part of the agricultural belt west of Parramatta, characterised by small farms and market gardens supplying fresh produce to Sydney. During the post-war housing expansion of the 1960s and 1970s, the rural landscape was progressively subdivided and developed into the residential suburb that exists today. From the late 1970s onwards, Canley Heights developed as an extension of the broader Cabramatta settlement area for Vietnamese, Chinese and Cambodian communities, with many families relocating to the suburb for larger housing while maintaining close ties to Cabramatta's commercial and cultural precinct. In 2025, Canley Heights and Canley Vale, collectively known as The Canleys, became the first 'Special Entertainment Precinct' in Western Sydney. The designation was intended to support a vibrant night-time economy by promoting live entertainment, cultural activities and extended trading hours while encouraging local economic growth.

== Commercial area ==
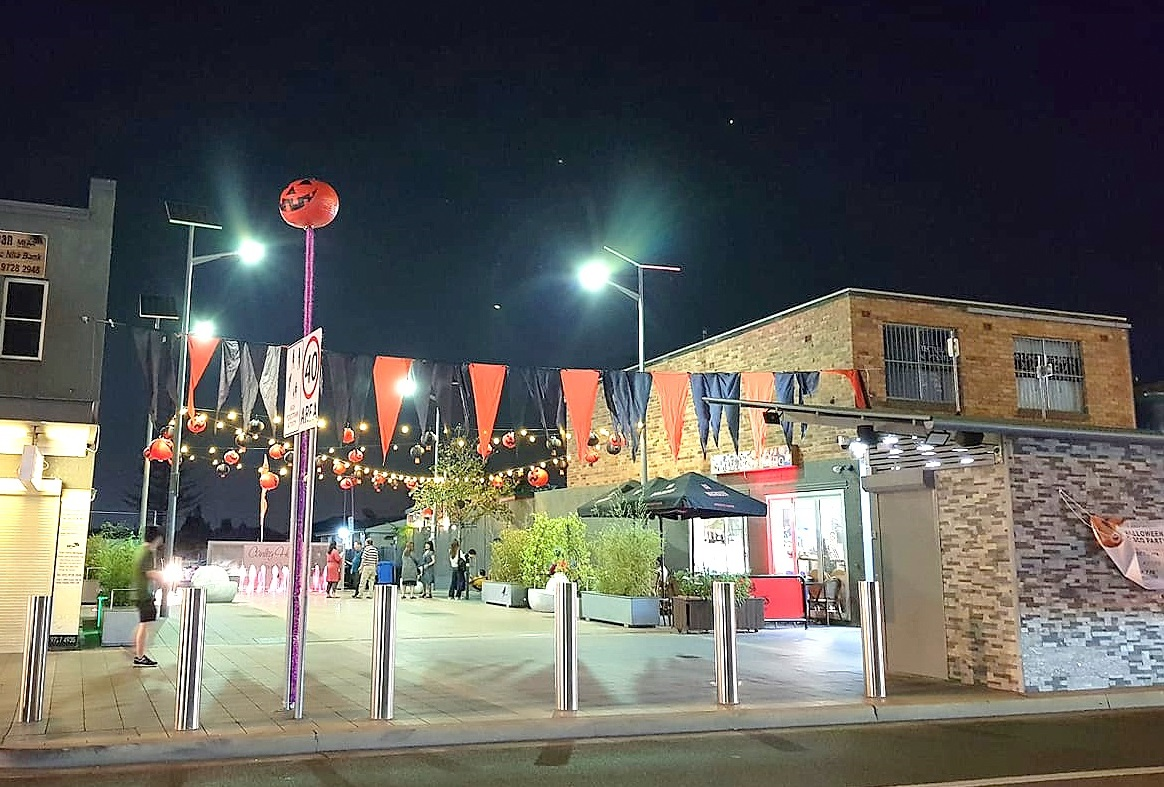
Canley Heights Town Square at night

Canley Heights mostly consists of low-density residential and commercial developments, many of which open until late on weekdays and weekends which offer a nightlife for the residents and visitors alike.

Its commercial area is centred on Canley Vale Road, the main street in the suburb, which features convenient stores, a post office, dollar stores, cafes, dentists and law firms, as well as a variety of ethnic restaurants (predominantly Vietnamese, but also Lao, Japanese, Korean, Thai and Middle Eastern). There are also bars, hotels (with a VIP lounge and bar) bistro and hookah lounge, some which open until late.

== Culture ==
There are two Christian Churches, the New Covenant Pentecostal Church, and the Global Family Church the latter primarily for the Spanish community.

== Recreational area ==
Parks in Canley Heights include Chisholm Park (the largest in the suburb that features a sport field), Peterlee Park, Derby Street Park, Ascot Park, Arbatus Park and other green spaces along the riparian strips of Green Valley Creek and Orphan School Creek. The Green Valley Creek riparian corridor, which traverses the suburb, contains several parks including Geramon Park, Halmon Park, Habbaniyah Park and Thebes Park. These parks comprise a series of passive recreation reserves with open grassed areas, scattered mature trees and remnant vegetation, providing neighbourhood open space and informal recreational opportunities along the creek corridor.

== Education ==
Canley Heights Public School is the only school in the suburb and was established in 1955 for K–6, the school has an enrolment of approximately 600 students. Since the suburb lacks a high school, students are in the Fairvale High School catchment in Fairfield West.

== Transport ==
The nearest railway station is located in the nearby suburb of Canley Vale, down the hill to the east. Cumberland Highway passes through Canley Heights.

Transit Systems NSW operate the 817 bus route (Cabramatta railway station to Canley Heights to Fairfield railway station), the 819 bus route (Canley Heights to Liverpool railway station), and the 9032 bus route (Canley Heights to Parramatta railway station), which serve the suburb.

== Demographics ==
According to the 2021 Population census, there were 12,320 residents in Canley Heights. 37.1% of people were born in Australia. The next most common countries of birth were Vietnam 30.9%, Cambodia 6.9%, Iraq 4.2%, New Zealand 1.2% and China 1.6%.

17.9% of people only spoke English at home. Other languages spoken at home included Vietnamese 42.1%, Cantonese 5.5%, Khmer 5.4%, Arabic 3.4%, and Assyrian Neo-Aramaic 2.7%.

The most common responses for religion in Canley Heights were Buddhism 37.1%, Catholic 18.8%, and no religion 18.8%.
