= St Johns Park, New South Wales =

St Johns Park
- Suburb
- Interactive map of St Johns Park
- Country: Australia
- State: New South Wales
- City: Sydney
- LGA: City of Fairfield
- Location: 35 km (22 mi) west of Sydney CBD

Government
  - State electorate: Cabramatta
  - Federal division: Fowler
- Elevation: 35 m (115 ft)

Population
  - Total: 6,302 (2021 census)
- Postcode: 2176
Suburbs around St Johns Park
Greenfield Park	Prairiewood	Wakeley
Edensor Park	St Johns Park	Canley Heights
Bonnyrigg	Cabramatta West	Cabramatta West

St Johns Park is a suburb of Sydney, in the state of New South Wales, Australia 35 kilometres west of the Sydney central business district, in the local government areas of the City of Fairfield. It is part of the Greater Western Sydney region.

== History ==
St Johns Park was originally home to the Cabrogal people who inhabited the broad Liverpool-Fairfield area. When the First Fleet arrived in Australia, the colonial administration designated this area the parish of St John. Nineteenth century maps indicate a St Johns Farm in the area and it is through this connection that the suburb gained its name.

By the 1890s there was a public school on Parkes Road (now Edensor Road), a post office (opened in 1888), and a growing community, with an unusual number of Italians, who had arrived in the 1880s after the failure of the Marquis de Rays's expedition to New Ireland. The Bellotti and Gava families established vineyards on Bulls Road.

Yugoslav migrants Theodore and Samuel Serovich arrived in 1885, also cultivating wine grapes.

Both the Italian and Yugoslav communities were renewed and expanded during the period of postwar migration in the 1940s, and St Johns Park is still a very multicultural area. Chicory and wild fennel growing along the banks of Clear Paddock Creek are relics of the early European farmers.

== Demographics ==
According to the 2021 census, St Johns Park had a population of 6,302 people with a median age of 43, which was higher than the national median age of 38. Over a third of people were born in Australia (39.0%), with the other most common countries of birth being Vietnam (18.2%), Iraq (7.1%), Cambodia (6.0%), Croatia (3.4%) and Laos (2.0%).

The majority of people spoke a language other than English at home (85.2%), with Vietnamese (23.9%), Cantonese (5.5%), Croatian (5.0%), Arabic (4.9%) and Assyrian Neo-Aramaic (4.8%) forming the top responses for languages spoken at home. About a fifth of people (20.9%) spoke only English at home.

== Housing ==
At the time of the 2016 census, St Johns Park had a total of 1,660 occupied private dwellings, of which 93.1% were separate houses, 6.4% were semi-detached dwellings and 0.4% were flats or apartments. Of these occupied private dwellings, 50.1% were owned outright, 29.6% were owned with a mortgage and 17.2% were rented.

== Environment ==
St Johns Park sits besides Clear Paddock Creek which runs along 500m. The creek's riparian corridor, which runs through the suburb, contains several parks that, from west to east, include Gawer Reserve, Bartella Park and Marganita Park. The 'Restoring the Waters' project, which was the first of its kind in Australia, consisted of the restoration of the concrete channel into a living stream. It took seven years to plan and build and was funded with the assistance of a $1.33 million grant from the NSW State Government through its Stormwater Trust.

== Schools ==
- St Johns Park Public School
- St Johns Park High School

== Places of worship ==
- St James Smithfield
- St Johns Park Baptist Church
- St Nikola Tavelić Croatian Catholic Church and Community Centre
- St Hurmizd Assyrian Church of the East Cathedral
- Vietnamese Buddhist Phap Bao Temple
- Tinh Xa Thanh Luong, a Vietnamese Buddhist temple

== Clubs ==
- St Johns Park Bowling Club
- St Johns Park Sports Club (also known as Jadran Hajduk Croatian Club).

== Services ==
- Cardinal Stepinac Village is a retirement hostel and nursing home

== Notable people ==
- Corey Payne, Australian rugby league footballer and administrator
