= Greenfield Park, New South Wales =

Greenfield Park
- Suburb
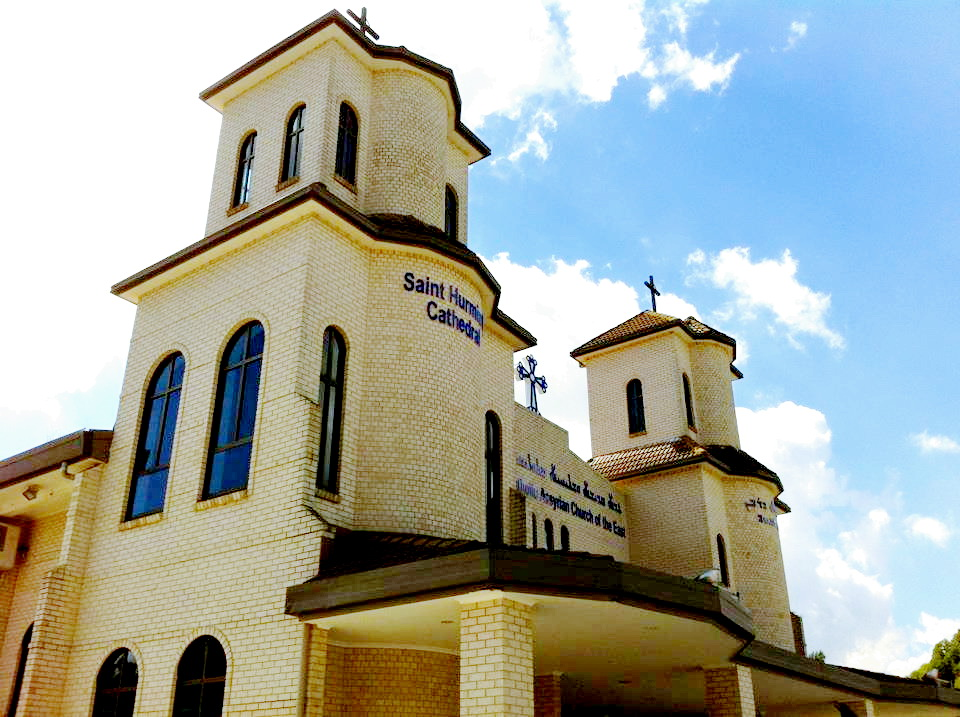
- The largest Assyrian church in Australia, St Hurmizd Cathedral.

- Interactive map of Greenfield Park
- Country: Australia
- State: New South Wales
- City: Sydney
- LGA: City of Fairfield
- Location: 36 km (22 mi) west of Sydney CBD
- Established: 1979

Government
  - State electorate: Cabramatta
  - Federal division: Fowler
- Elevation: 41 m (135 ft)

Population
  - Total: 5,394 (2021 census)
- Postcode: 2176
Suburbs around Greenfield Park
Bossley Park	Bossley Park	Prairiewood
Edensor Park	Greenfield Park	Wakeley
Edensor Park	Bonnyrigg	St Johns Park

Greenfield Park is a suburb of Sydney, in the state of New South Wales, Australia. Greenfield Park is located 36 kilometres west of the Sydney central business district in the local government area of the City of Fairfield. The suburb has one of the highest proportions of Assyrian people in the Sydney area and Australia per se.

== History ==
Aboriginal people from the Cabrogal tribe, a sub-group of the Gandangara tribe, have lived in the Fairfield area for over 30,000 years. White settlement began in the Fairfield area in the early 19th century. Greenfield Park was named after a major road that cuts through the Council Ward of St Johns. It officially became a suburb on 3 August 1979.

== Churches ==
Greenfield Park is home to St Hurmizd Cathedral, Australia's largest Assyrian church.

== Commercial area ==
Greenfield Park is home to a small local shopping village, known as the "Greenfield Park Shopping Village". The Shopping Village houses a number of SME (Small to Medium Enterprises), as well as an IGA.

== Recreational area ==
Greenfield Park contains several local parks and recreational reserves, including Hornet Park, Natchez Park, Powhatan Park, Wylde Park and Chickasaw Crescent Reserve. Powhatan Park includes a football field, while the other reserves provide areas of public open space within the predominantly residential suburb. Edensor Creek, a small tributary of Clear Paddock Creek, briefly flows through the south-western part of Greenfield Park near Smithfield Road before joining Clear Paddock Creek.

== Schools ==
Greenfield Park is home to St Johns Park High School, and St Hurmizd Assyrian Primary School.

== Population ==
At the 2021 census, there were 5,394 residents in Greenfield Park. 35.6% of people were born in Australia. The most common other countries of birth were Iraq (23.4%), Vietnam (9.8%), Syria (7.5%), Cambodia (2.8%) and the Philippines (1.5%).

The top ancestries were Assyrian (26.4%), Vietnamese (12.3%), Chinese (9.0%), Chaldean (8.2%) and Iraqi (7.8%). Noting that Chaldeans are ethnically Assyrian, the total percentage of Assyrian ancestry equals 34.6%.

The majority of people spoke a language other than English at home. Other languages spoken included Assyrian Neo-Aramaic (24.6%), Vietnamese (13.3%), Chaldean Neo-Aramaic (8.7%), Arabic (7.2%) and Spanish (2.9%). Combining Assyrian and Chaldean variations of Sureth, the total percentage of Neo-Aramaic spoken equals 33.3%.

The top religious affiliations were Catholicism 37.2%, Assyrian Church of the East (17.6%), Buddhism (13.5%), No religion (9.5%) and Christian, nfd (no further definition) (5.5%). Christianity was the largest religious group reported overall (72.3%).

== Transport ==
The T-way bus route opened in 2003 and passes through Greenfield Park. Also, a number of Transit Systems bus services pass through Greenfield Park or nearby suburbs. Notably, route 804 links residents of Greenfield Park to both the Liverpool and Parramatta commercial areas.
