= Orphan School Creek (Fairfield) =

Creek in Fairfield, New South Wales, Australia

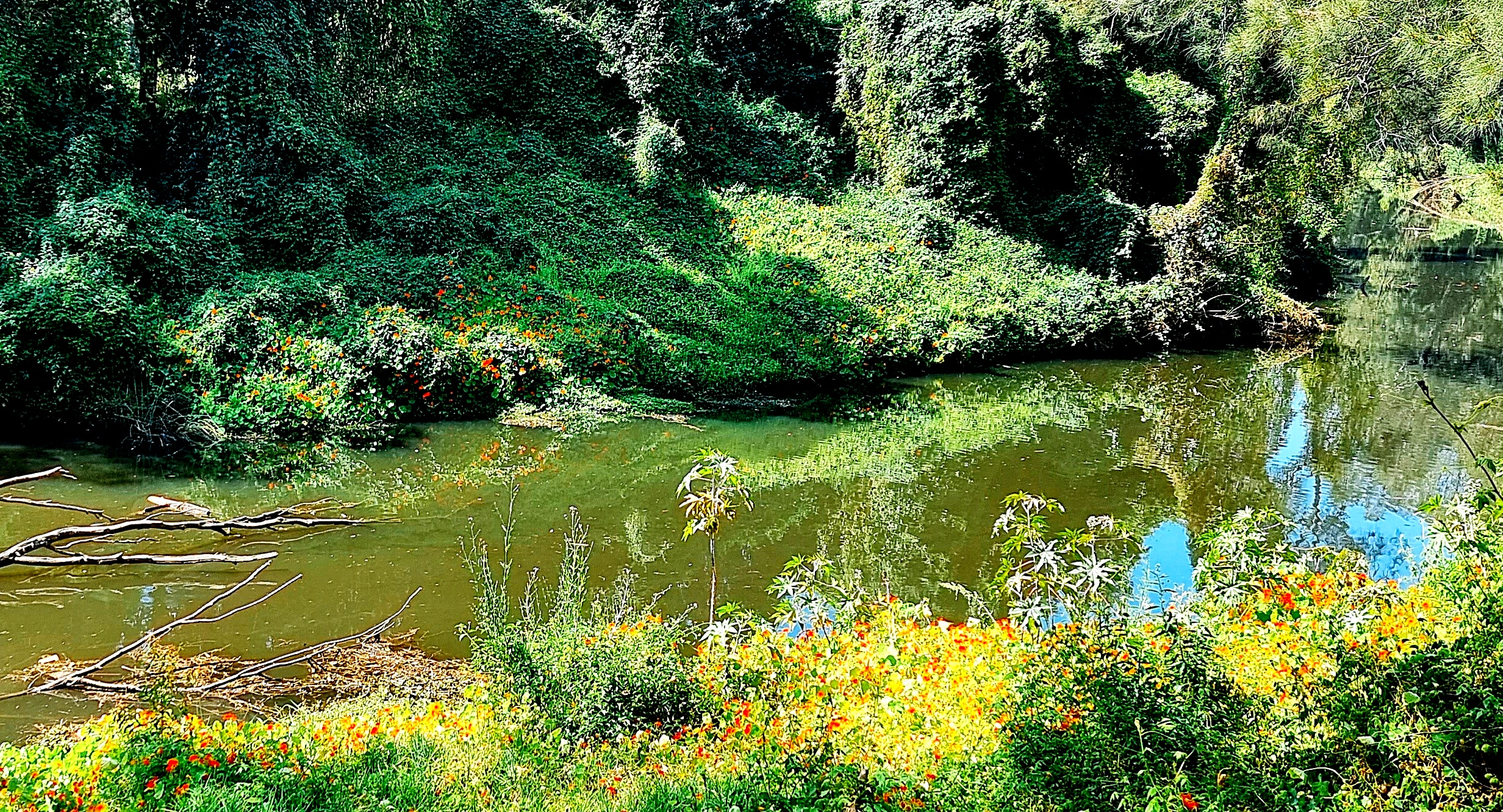
- The creek near Canley Vale

Location
- Country: Australia
- State: New South Wales
- Region: Sydney Basin (IBRA), Greater Western Sydney
- LGAs: Fairfield

Physical characteristics
- Source: near Arrawatta Close
  - location: Edensor Park
- Mouth: confluence with Prospect Creek
  - location: north of Vincent Crescent, Canley Vale
- Length: 12 km (7.5 mi)

Basin features
- River system: Georges River
- Tributaries
  - left: Clear Paddock Creek, Green Valley Creek
- Dam / Reservoir: Prospect Reservoir

Orphan School Creek is an urban watercourse located entirely within the City of Fairfield, New South Wales, Australia. Situated in Western Sydney on the Cumberland Plain, the creek is the main tributary of Prospect Creek. As the name suggests, Orphan School Creek was named after an orphan school in the area.

Part of the Georges River and Botany Bay Catchment, it is a tidal creek that flows east into Prospect Creek, rising and falling with the tide from the Georges River. It features several different fish species, native flora and fauna (including birds). Moreover, it is an "endangered ecological community" that is under ecological threat from the encircling urban development and activities.

== History ==
Historically, Orphan School Creek, like many creeks in the area, were rarely a continuous stream, but rather "a chain of ponds" (as described by the early European settlers), before the disturbance of their banks by the settlers. The creek was named after a male orphan school established in 17 March 1824, where it admitted poor boys aged between seven and ten to acquire basic education and industrial coaching, including farming skills.

By 1827, wood dormitories, a master’s residence, school rooms and other affiliated buildings were also built, and the site was called ‘New farm’. The farm appointed convicts to work as labourers, carpenters, watchmen, tradesman, etc. Very large in size, the farm that included the orphan school bordered Prospect Creek to the north and was bisected by the Orphan School Creek and Clear Paddock Creek. The farm closed down prematurely in the summer of 1827 after three-year drought. The name 'Orphan School' was a misnomer as many children there were not orphans at all.

== Geography ==
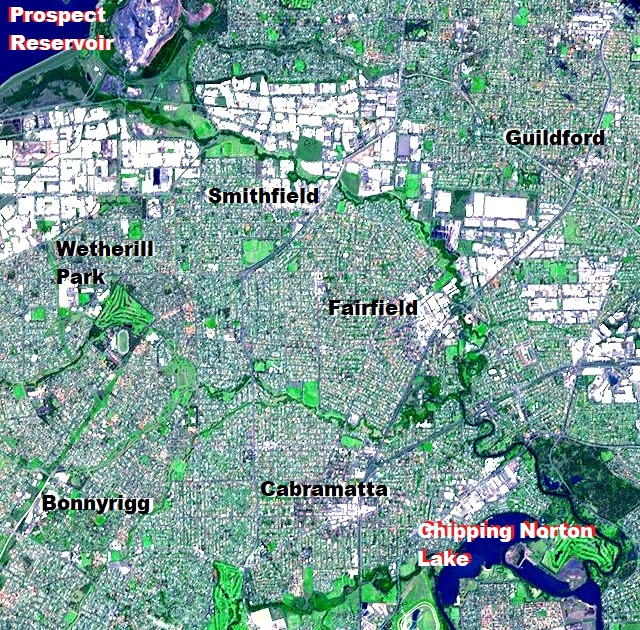
The creek's course through the green belt (centre) from its confluence with Prospect Creek in the east toward Bonnyrigg in the west

The creek starts just below Cowpasture Road, opposite Stockdale Crescent Reserve, at Bossley Park, on the border with Abbotsbury, and flows generally eastwards before emptying into Prospect Creek at Vincent Crescent Reserve, on the border between Fairfield and Canley Vale. It is approximately 12 kilometres (7.5 mi) long and has a catchment area of 38 square kilometres (15 mi^{2}). Its tributaries include Clear Paddock Creek and Green Valley Creek.

Orphan School Creek is predominantly a natural waterway bordered by Coastal Swamp Oak Forest, although sections have been modified for urban drainage. Its middle reach between Smithfield Road and King Road includes a concrete-lined channel, which in places is narrow and carries shallow flows, giving it a brook-like appearance.

St Elmos Drain forms part of the drainage network associated with the creek. It consists of approximately 500 metres (1,600 ft) of concrete-lined channel followed by 500 metres (1,600 ft) of piped drainage and approximately 1 kilometre (0.62 mi) of natural waterway and riparian zone before its confluence with Orphan School Creek.

The creek flows through several parks and nature reserves, which are a continuous strip of parkland bordering a riparian zone. From west to east they include, Allambie Park, Coolatai Park, Powhatan Park, Wylde Park, Devenish Street Reserve, Galloway Reserve, Dunleavy Street Park, O'Meally Reserve, Fairfield Indigenous Flora Park (a strict nature reserve unopened to public), Fairfield Golf Course, Dunstan Reserve, Dwyer Park, Esperance Reserve, Goodacre Park, Baragoola Reserve, Endeavour Sports Park, Avenel Park, Prince Street Park, Johnny Mac Reserve, Johnston Park, Ada Street Reserve and Vincent Crescent Reserve. During wet weather, treated flows from the Fairfield facility may occasionally be discharged into the Georges River via Orphan School Creek.

== Ecology ==
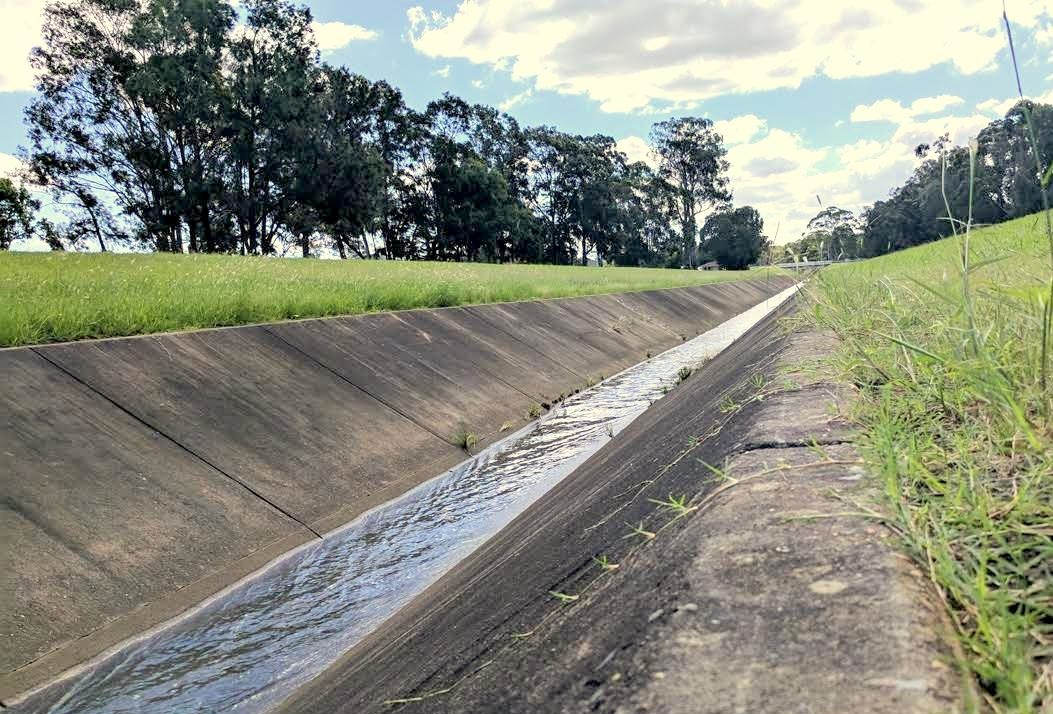
The concrete-lined course at Fairfield West

Plant life along the banks of the creek features species from the Cumberland Plain Woodland, Sydney Coastal River Flat Forest and Coastal Swamp Oak Forest (the latter two at natural waterway section). Such species found include Eucalyptus amplifolia, Eucalyptus moluccana, Acacia implexa, Bursaria spinosa, Eucalyptus tereticornis and Casuarina glauca. Destructive weeds include Cestrum parqui, Ipomoea indica, Cardiospermum halicacabum and Castor oil plant.

Native waterbirds present at the creek include the Australasian bittern, Eurasian Coot, Great cormorant, White-necked heron, White-faced heron, Australian White Ibis, Azure Kingfisher, Sacred Kingfisher, Little Pied Cormorant, Little Egret, Great Crested Grebe, Dusky Moorhen, Australasian swamphen, Kookaburra, Masked Lapwing, Yellow-billed spoonbill, Grey Teal, Australian wood duck, Chestnut Teal, and the Pacific Black Duck.

Native fish found in the creek include the Bullrout, Flat Head Gudgeon, Striped Gudgeon, Cox's Gudgeon, Australian Bass, Australian Smelt, Silver Biddy, Southern Blue Eye, Estuary Perchlet, Long-finned Eel, Yellowfin Bream, Flathead grey mullet, Jollytail Galaxias, Dwarf Flat Head Gudgeon, Freshwater mullet, Empire Fish, and the Short-finned eel.

The creek features eight different habitat zones, which include, but are not limited to: Both deep and shallow pools with a gravelly bottom (that accompany tree logs and weeds), elevated weed beds, a riffle zone, rocky shelves (which feature drop-off points), in addition to the rare and diverse intertidal zone that features marsh plants and a sandy floor with excessive mud – This zone has a drop of 1 metre (3 ft 3 in) between the high and low tides.

=== Environmental issues ===
The creek has changed dramatically in recent years, where it used to have a very biodiverse environment. Today, the stream flows faster since trees (that used to slower the flow) have been cleared. Since the ensuing urban development in the encircling areas, the form of the stream bed has been altered, in addition to land clearing and higher surface run-off that often end up with waste and toxins. Most wildlife found around the creek has been erased. Weirs and the concrete channel section of the creek have decreased native fish habitats. Since the creek bed consisted of small gravel, it provided an ideal environment for a variety off small creatures to live. Today, the gravel layers have been deposited and polluted by heavy metals and batteries, ensuing in the extermination of large abundance of aquatic life.

Aquatic creatures has been significantly lessened because the branches and leaves that used to fall in the water provided the vital food sources and nutrients. Moreover, tree logs shielded fish from rapid flowing waters and predators. The Australian Bass and Common galaxiass now live in highly reduced environments on the creek line; from the 24.8 kilometres (15.4 mi) of the creek line to only about 1.5 kilometres (0.93 mi). After heavy rain, fish are transported further down stream in the rapid waters that are loaded with debris, thereby causing injury to the fish.

== Crossings ==
The following roads and railways form crossings over Orphan School Creek. From west to east, following the course of the creek, they are:

- Belfield Road
- Sweethaven Road
- Mimosa Road
- Liverpool–Parramatta T-Way
- Moonlight Road
- Hamilton Road
- King Road
- Cumberland Highway
- Sackville Street
- Railway Parade
- Main Southern Railway

== Gallery ==
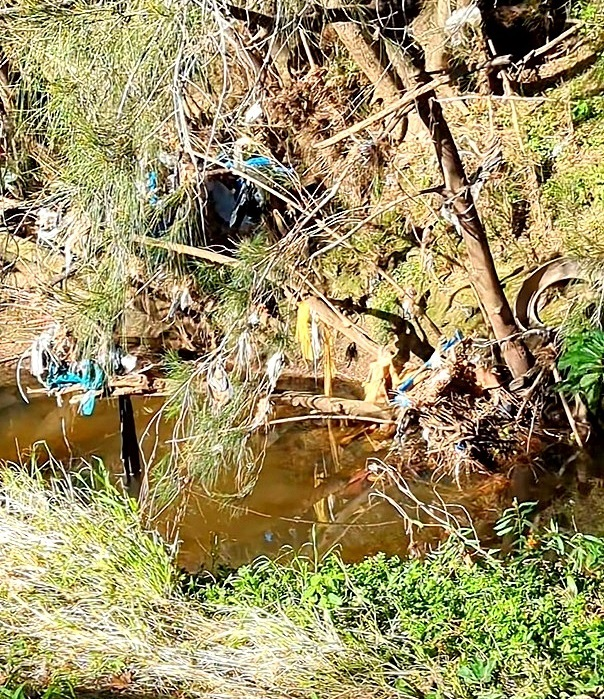
Plastic waste and other litter in Wakeley

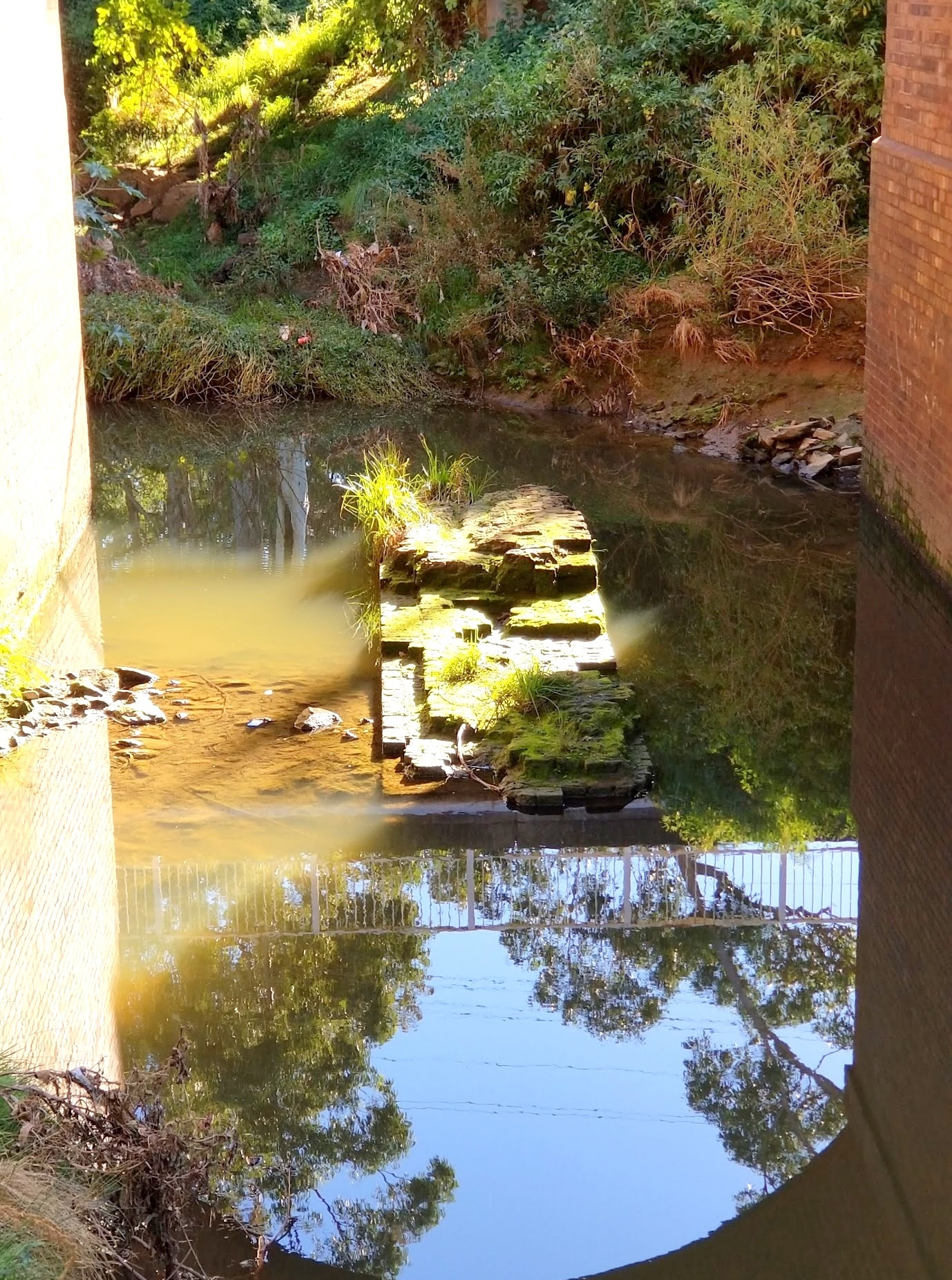
The creek flowing beneath a footbridge at Canley Vale

== See also ==
- Clear Paddock Creek
- Prospect Creek
- Burns Creek
- Georges River
- Male Orphan School land
