= Bossley Park =

- Suburb
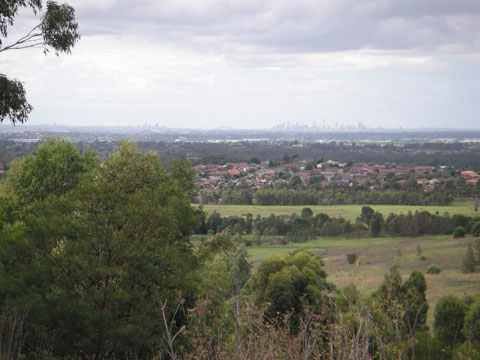
- Suburb in foreground with residential houses

- Interactive map of Bossley Park
- Coordinates: 33°51′48″S 150°53′01″E
- Country: Australia
- State: New South Wales
- City: Sydney
- LGA: City of Fairfield
- Location: 36 km (22 mi) west of Sydney CBD

Government
  - State electorate: Prospect
  - Federal division: Fowler

Area
  - Total: 4.5 km^{2} (1.7 sq mi)
- Elevation: 60 m (200 ft)

Population
  - Total: 15,492 (2021 census)
  - Density: 3,440/km^{2} (8,920/sq mi)
- Postcode: 2176
Suburbs around Bossley Park
Horsley Park	Wetherill Park	Wetherill Park
Abbotsbury	Bossley Park	Prairiewood
Abbotsbury	Edensor Park	Greenfield Park

Bossley Park is a suburb of Sydney, in the state of New South Wales, Australia. Bossley Park is located 36 kilometres west of the Sydney central business district in the local government area of the City of Fairfield. Bossley Park is part of the Greater Western Sydney region.

The suburb is most well known for being an ethnic enclave of Assyrian and other Iraqi ethnic groups living in Sydney. Furthermore, Bossley Park was Australia's most Catholic suburb in 2018, with 49.9% of residents being adherents of Catholicism.

== History ==
Bossley Park was named after John Brown Bossley (1810–72), an English chemist who purchased a large block of land on Smithfield Road. He named his property Edensor after a village in Derbyshire, England. When the area north of Edensor was subdivided in 1890, it became known as Bossley Park. The public school was built in 1890 and a post office in 1895. The area that is now Bossley Park used be called "Box Country" as it contained tall eucalypt forests with Eucalyptus moluccana being spread out in grassy savannas, and therefore early settlers found the region to be favorable land for sheep and cattle grazing.

After World War II, Bossley Park received many migrants from Italy, who have since played a large role in the local community. Bossley Park and its surrounding suburbs were rural areas until the 1970s, when they were developed into a residential settlement.

== Demographics ==
According to the 2021 census of population, there were 15,492 residents in Bossley Park.

41.4% of people were born in Australia. The most common other countries of birth were Iraq (22.4%), Italy (3.5%), Vietnam (3.8%), Syria (2.8%) and Philippines (1.8%). 29.9% of people only spoke English at home. Other languages spoken at home included Neo-Aramaic (Sureth) (23.1%), Arabic (10.5%), Italian (4.5%), and Vietnamese (4.4%).

The most common reported ancestries were Assyrian (23.1%), Italian (11.4%), Australians (9.4%), Iraqi (8.6%).

The most common responses for religion in Bossley Park were Catholic (49.3%), Assyrian Apostolic (8.0%), No religion (8.0%), Buddhism (6.4%), and not stated (5.8%). Christianity was the largest religious group reported overall (78.8%).

== Education ==
Bossley Park has a number of government schools including Bossley Park High School, Bossley Park Public School and Prairievale Public School. There is also the Catholic run Mary Immaculate Primary School.

== Places of worship ==
- Mary Immaculate Catholic Church
- St Thomas the Apostle Chaldean Catholic Church
- St Barnabas' Anglican Church

Bossley Park residents are predominantly Catholic (Latin and Eastern), Assyrian Orthodox and Anglican.

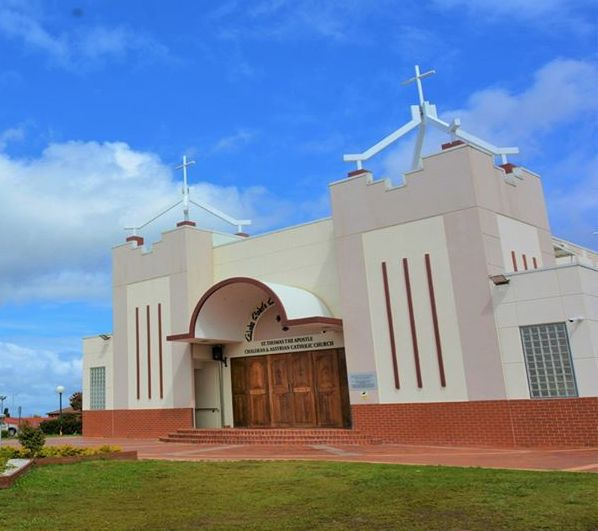
St Thomas Chaldean & Assyrian Church, built in 2006

== Parks and recreation ==
The Marconi Stallions football club was founded in the area by Italian immigrants in the 1960s with the Marconi Stadium being built there in 1972 along with ongoing development of the licensed club. The eastern boundary of the suburb is adjacent to a large recreational park Wetherill Park Nature Reserve. Orphan School Creek winds through the suburb's southern fringes in Comanche Park, and walking paths run parallel to the creek. Restwell Road and Prairie Vale Road have the greatest recorded street-tree canopy cover in Bossley Park, at approximately 7,883 m² and 5,123 m², respectively.

Nazareth Reserve is a passive bushland reserve comprising dense remnant eucalypt woodland and native understorey vegetation, remaining largely undeveloped and serving primarily as a remnant natural area with limited public accessibility. Nohadra Reserve is a passive bushland reserve comprising remnant eucalypt woodland and native understorey vegetation, remaining largely undeveloped except for a pedestrian pathway providing access between the surrounding residential area and Cowpasture Road. Hebron Reserve is another passive recreation reserve fronting The Horsley Drive, comprising an open grassed area bordered by remnant eucalypt woodland, providing neighbourhood open space for informal recreation. There is also Ishtar Park, a passive recreation park comprising an open grassed area with a soccer goal for informal recreation.

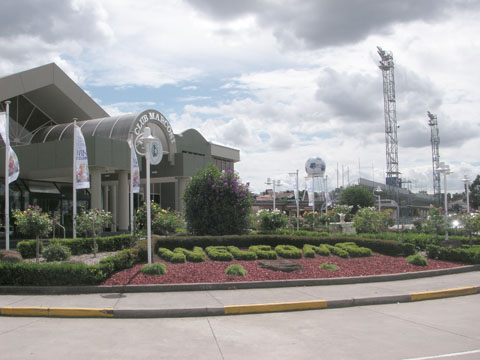
Club Marconi

== Climate ==
Like most of Sydney, Bossley Park has a humid subtropical climate (Cfa) with warm to hot summers and cool winters. Most of the precipitation falls in the first four months of the year, with fewer rainfall amount during the middle of the year.

Climate data for Horsley Park (Sydney International Equestrian Centre)
Month	Jan	Feb	Mar	Apr	May	Jun	Jul	Aug	Sep	Oct	Nov	Dec	Year
Record high °C (°F)	47.0 (116.6)	46.4 (115.5)	40.5 (104.9)	35.9 (96.6)	28.1 (82.6)	24.7 (76.5)	27.3 (81.1)	28.4 (83.1)	36.0 (96.8)	37.5 (99.5)	42.0 (107.6)	44.4 (111.9)	47.0 (116.6)
Mean daily maximum °C (°F)	29.9 (85.8)	28.7 (83.7)	26.8 (80.2)	23.8 (74.8)	20.5 (68.9)	17.6 (63.7)	17.4 (63.3)	19.1 (66.4)	22.4 (72.3)	24.7 (76.5)	26.4 (79.5)	28.4 (83.1)	23.8 (74.8)
Mean daily minimum °C (°F)	18.0 (64.4)	17.8 (64.0)	16.2 (61.2)	12.9 (55.2)	9.0 (48.2)	7.0 (44.6)	5.9 (42.6)	6.6 (43.9)	9.3 (48.7)	11.9 (53.4)	14.3 (57.7)	16.2 (61.2)	12.1 (53.8)
Record low °C (°F)	10.6 (51.1)	10.4 (50.7)	7.2 (45.0)	1.9 (35.4)	1.0 (33.8)	−1.8 (28.8)	−2.3 (27.9)	−0.5 (31.1)	0.7 (33.3)	3.6 (38.5)	6.6 (43.9)	9.0 (48.2)	−2.3 (27.9)
Average precipitation mm (inches)	75.7 (2.98)	122.3 (4.81)	90.1 (3.55)	69.0 (2.72)	43.6 (1.72)	66.5 (2.62)	51.3 (2.02)	39.1 (1.54)	37.4 (1.47)	62.7 (2.47)	77.8 (3.06)	66.2 (2.61)	804.4 (31.67)
Average precipitation days (≥ 1 mm)	8.0	7.5	8.6	6.9	5.1	6.0	5.4	4.1	5.0	6.0	7.1	7.1	76.8
Average relative humidity (%)	49	53	54	53	52	55	50	42	42	45	50	48	49
Source: Bureau of Meteorology

== Notable residents ==
- Mark Schwarzer – Socceroo goalkeeper and World Cup player.
