= St Johns Park High School =

Location
- Mimosa Road, Greenfield Park, South Western Sydney, New South Wales; Australia; 33°52′S 150°53′E

Information
- Type: Government-funded Co-educational Comprehensive Secondary High School
- Motto: Know First Yourself
- Established: 1978; 48 years ago
- Educational authority: New South Wales Department of Education
- Years: 7–12
- Enrolment: ~900 (2019)
- Colours: Sky blue, navy and yellow
- Slogan: Safe Respectful Learners
- Website: stjohnspk-h.schools.nsw.gov.au

St Johns Park High School (abbreviated as SJPHS) is a government-funded co-educational comprehensive secondary day school, located on Mimosa Road in Greenfield Park, a south-western suburb of Sydney, New South Wales, Australia.

Established in 1978, the school caters to approximately 900 students from Year 7 to Year 12, many of whom come from a language background other than English. The school is operated by the New South Wales Department of Education.

== Achievements ==
St Johns Park High School has dominated in the sport of table tennis in the NSW State for fifteen years led by their coach D Ho. Not only have they gained success in the state level but also at the National level, taking out the Australian Schools Open Boys title and also the Australia Schools Intermediate Girls title.

In 2005, 26 students achieved a score of either ninety or above out of one hundred in over forty-four subjects in the HSC. Subsequently, St Johns Park High School came second on the list of top HSC scoring schools in the area of Fairfield City, behind Sefton High School.

== Notable alumni ==
- Harry Kewell – former soccer player; now soccer coach; played with the Socceroos and Melbourne Victory, as well as internationally
- Chris Bowen – politician; served as the Member for McMahon since 2010, having previously served as the Member for Prospect from 2004 to 2010

== See also ==
- List of government schools in New South Wales
- Education in Australia
- James Ruse Agricultural High School
