= Bossley Park High School =

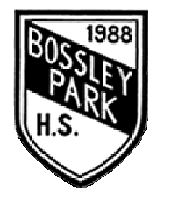

Location
- Bossley Park, New South Wales; Australia; 33°52′13″S 150°52′30″E

Information
- Type: Government-funded co-educational comprehensive secondary day school
- Motto: Focussing on Excellence and Achieving and Receiving
- Established: 1988; 38 years ago
- School district: Cowpasture
- Educational authority: New South Wales Department of Education
- Oversight: NSW Education Standards Authority
- Teaching staff: 55.4 FTE (2018)
- Years: 7–12
- Enrolment: 1,445 (2018)
- Campus type: Suburban
- Colours: White and grey
- Website: bossleypk-h.schools.nsw.gov.au

Bossley Park High School (abbreviated as BPHS) is a government-funded co-educational comprehensive secondary day school, located in Bossley Park, a western suburb of Sydney, New South Wales, Australia.

Established in 1988, the school enrolled approximately 1,500 students in 2018, from Year 7 to Year 12, of whom one percent identified as Indigenous Australians and 82 percent were from a language background other than English. The school is operated by the NSW Department of Education in accordance with a curriculum developed by the New South Wales Education Standards Authority.

The school's catchment area includes the rapidly developing suburbs of Bossley Park and Abbotsbury in western Sydney. In 1999 it was revealed by The Sunday Telegraph that Bossley Park High School was the richest state high school which had a bank balance of more A$7 million. In 2004, The Sydney Morning Herald revealed the school had more than $10 million in reserves.

== History ==
Bossley Park High School is built on land that was formerly producing fruits, vegetables, flowers and poultry products, a site of almost 7 hectares (17 acres). Planning for the new school began in 1985 and White Industries Pty Ltd, was the company in charge for the construction. The contract price for the construction was almost $8 million, but, including the costs of the land and the furnishing of the buildings the final cost came to approximately $10 million. The school was established in 1988 with a small year 7 enrolment of 125 students.

The inaugural principal was Brian Jux. His successor was Ian Parnaby who served for 12 years before retiring in 2013. Michelle Wood succeeded Parnaby as principal, with Vera Chevell as principal for 2015–2021 and the current principal is Chris Hollis.

== Facilities ==
The food labs were upgraded to industry standards to facilitate the vocational education and training course hospitality operations. A concrete court was laid so that students with physical disabilities had an area where they could play sports such as wheelchair rugby. In mid-2007, a shelter was built in order to shelter it from rain.

=== Further upgrades ===
In 2008 major renovations continued including three water tanks, holding 315,000 litres (69,000 imp gal; 83,000 US gal), buried on the school grounds to keep the oval in good condition. A shelter has been built over the basketball courts to catch the rain, which then flows into the tanks, to be used for irrigation. Project on a new performance center, to be completed by March 2010, would also be hooked up to the tanks. This is the start of the school's water and energy saving plans. The school aims to have solar power generators installed on the performance centre. It is estimated to cut down $3,000 per month on water bills.

== Multiculturalism ==
Bossley Park High, as a secondary school in a multicultural community has a high percentage of students from differing ethnicities. Approximately 80% of the student body comes from a non-English speaking background. They include: Spanish, Italian, Assyrian, Arabic, Vietnamese, Cambodian and Chinese Dialects.

== Sports ==
Bossley Park High has achieved success in sports. The school has a Talented Football Program for players interested in soccer, affiliated with the Sydney FC. Bossley Park High has won the Bill Turner Cup three times. In 1992, they won against Oxley High School. In 2002, they won against Lambton High and in 2009, the school won the 31st Bill Turner Cup against Cavendish Road State High.

== School houses ==
Students are organised into four houses based on their last names. They are:

- Edina (green)
- Gandangara (yellow)
- Sartor (red)
- Tarburton (blue)

== Notable alumni ==
- Iain Ramsay – soccer player; played with Sukhothai, Sydney FC, Melbourne City, Sydney Olympic, Adelaide United, Tractor Sazi, Ceres–Negros and Felda United; represents the Philippines internationally
- Liam Rose – soccer player; played with Central Coast Mariners, and FC Ararat-Armenia

== See also ==
- List of government schools in New South Wales
- Education in Australia
