= Prairiewood =

- Suburb
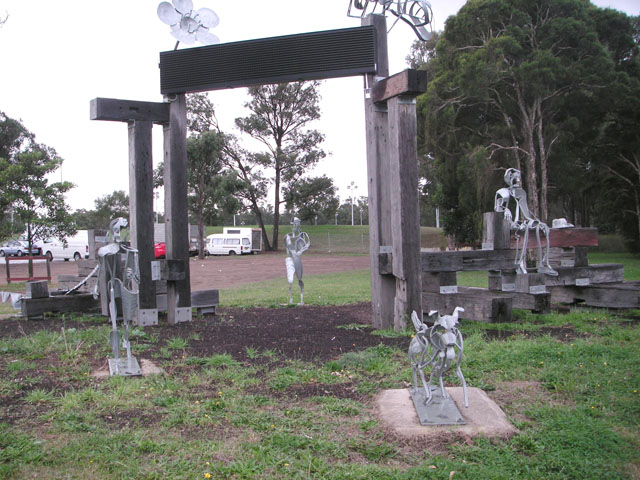
- Fairfield Showground, Prairiewood

- Interactive map of Prairiewood
- Country: Australia
- State: New South Wales
- City: Sydney
- LGA: City of Fairfield
- Location: 34 km (21 mi) west of Sydney CBD

Government
  - State electorates: Prospect; Fairfield
  - Federal divisions: McMahon; Fowler
- Elevation: 39 m (128 ft)

Population
  - Total: 3,457 (2021 census)
- Postcode: 2176
Suburbs around Prairiewood
Bossley Park	Wetherill Park	Smithfield West/Smithfield
Bossley Park	Prairiewood	Fairfield West
Greenfield Park	St Johns Park	Wakeley

Prairiewood is a suburb of Sydney, in the state of New South Wales, Australia. It is located 34 kilometres west of the Sydney central business district, in the local government area of the City of Fairfield. It is part of the Greater Western Sydney region.

Prairiewood is primarily a residential suburb that is also home to a golf course, Fairfield Showground, schools, a leisure centre and a major shopping centre.

== History ==
Prairiewood was once a part of Wetherill Park. The area was subdivided and developed in the 1970s as Prairiewood Estate. It later became a suburb and took on the name of the estate.

== Commercial areas ==
Stockland Wetherill Park is a major shopping centre that is actually located in the north-western corner of Prairiewood. Fairfield Hospital moved to Prairiewood in 1988 from its original location in Fairfield.

== Culture and recreation ==
Fairfield Golf Course is an 18-hole course. Fairfield Showground is home to many cultural celebrations and the Fairfield Markets, which are a common attraction every Saturday morning. The Parklands Function Centre is situated near the showground and provides venues for wedding and birthday parties for up to 250 people. Ashur Reserve, in the south, is a passive natural reserve characterised by open grassland resembling a meadow, with tall native grasses, scattered shrubs and remnant eucalypt woodland, remaining largely undeveloped. Giinagay Reserve contains a walking path, accessible from Moonlight Road, which extends through the reserve towards Fairfield Golf Course. The reserve also contains a fenced off-leash dog park. Immediately to its north is the Fairfield Indigenous Flora Park, a remnant of the endangered Cumberland Plain Woodland.

== Demographics ==
According to the 2021 census, Prairiewood had a population of 3,457. 43.8% of people were born in Australia. The most common countries of birth were Iraq 15.5%, Vietnam 6.7%, Italy 3.2%, Syria 3.2% and Croatia 2.3%.

The most common ancestries were Assyrian 14.9%, Italian 10.3%, Vietnamese 9.0%, Chinese 8.9% and Australian 8.8%.

28.6% of people only spoke English at home. Other languages spoken at home included Assyrian Neo-Aramaic (13.7%), Vietnamese (9.9%), Arabic (8.7%), Chaldean Neo-Aramaic (6.2%), and Spanish (4.7%). Noting that Assyrian and Chaldean Neo-Aramaic are dialects of the same language (Sureth), the total Neo-Aramaic speakers totals 19.2%.

The most common responses for religion were Catholic 41.6%, No Religion 10.3%, Buddhism 10.0%, and Assyrian Apostolic 9.7%.
