= Wakeley, New South Wales =

Suburb of Sydney, New South Wales, Australia

Wakeley
- Suburb
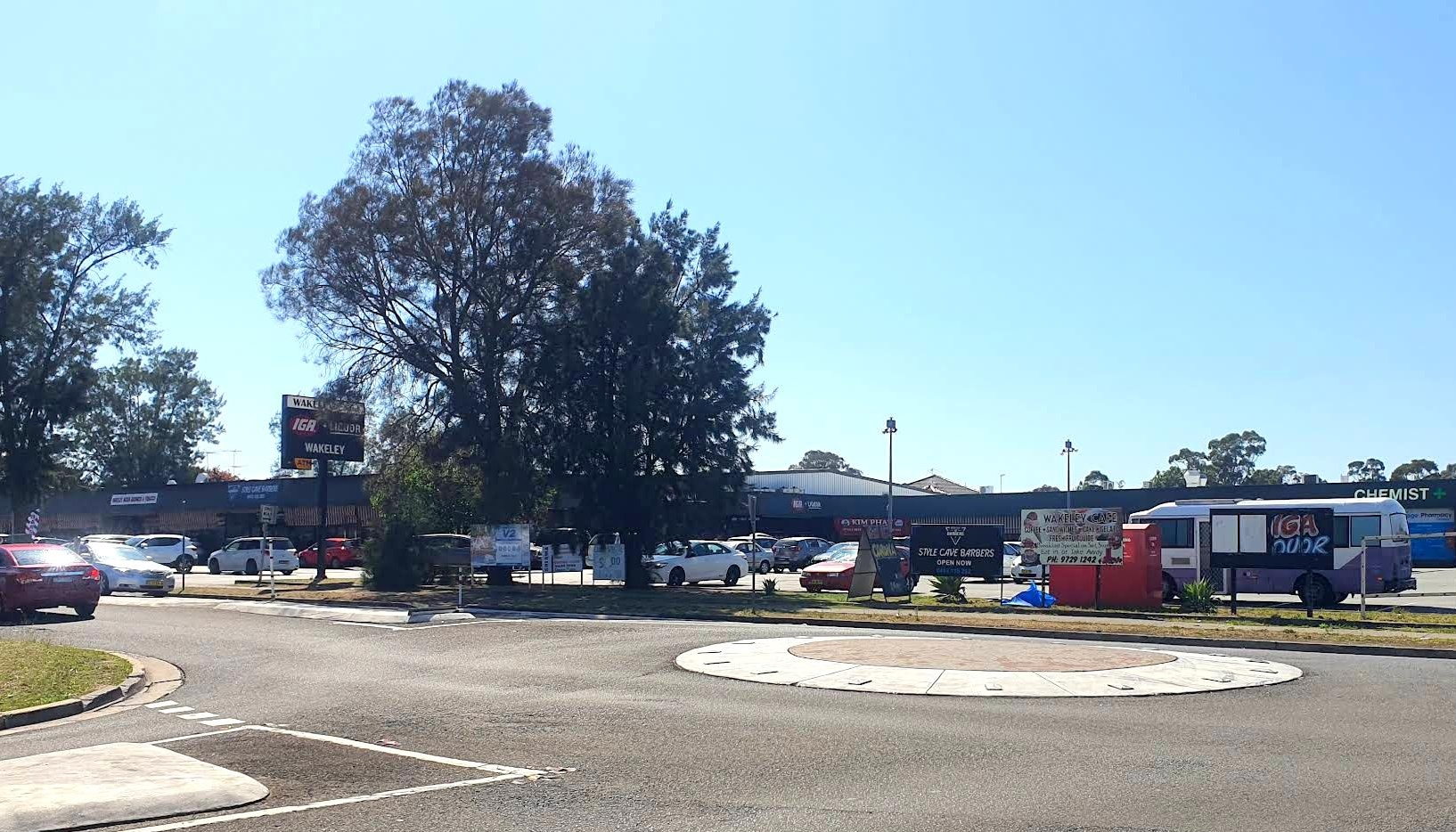
- Wakeley Shopping Centre

- Interactive map of Wakeley
- Country: Australia
- State: New South Wales
- City: Sydney
- LGA: City of Fairfield
- Location: 34 km (21 mi) west of Sydney CBD
- Established: 1980

Government
  - State electorate: Fairfield
  - Federal division: Fowler
- Elevation: 25 m (82 ft)

Population
  - Total: 4,893 (SAL 2021)
- Postcode: 2176
Suburbs around Wakeley
Greenfield Park	Prairiewood	Fairfield West
St Johns Park	Wakeley	Canley Heights
St Johns Park	St Johns Park	Canley Heights

Wakeley is a suburb of Sydney, in the state of New South Wales, Australia, 34 kilometres west of the Sydney central business district and is the council seat in the local government area of the City of Fairfield. Wakeley is part of the Greater Western Sydney region. At the 2021 census, Wakeley has a population of 4,893.

The City of Fairfield Council Chambers are located in Wakeley.

== History ==
Wakeley is named after Daniel Wakeley, an early settler in the area. It was mainly used for farming until being redeveloped as a residential suburb in 1980.

== Geology ==
In 1964, the Australian Oil and Gas Corporation drilled the Fairfield-1 exploratory well in what is now Esperance Reserve, as part of petroleum exploration of the Sydney Basin. The well was located at approximately 33.8711°S 150.9150°E, at a ground elevation of 22.3 m (73 ft), and reached a total depth of 855.3 m (2,806 ft) below ground level.

Drilling began in the Wianamatta Group, with the well entering the Hawkesbury Sandstone at a depth of 73.5 m (241 ft) and the underlying Narrabeen Group at 312.1 m (1,024 ft). The Narrabeen Group consisted of interbedded siltstone and poorly sorted sandstone, with subordinate mudstone and shale, deposited in an alluvial floodplain environment. Gas was encountered in several sandstone layers within the Narrabeen Group. Drill-stem tests at depths of 496 m (1,627 ft) and 542 m (1,778 ft) produced initial gas flows of 821 m^{3} (29,000 ft^{3}) and 1,862 m^{3} (65,800 ft^{3}) per day, respectively; in both cases, the gas consisted of approximately 96% carbon dioxide.

The well was drilled into an elongated northeast–southwest-oriented anticline. Fairfield-1 was subsequently classified as a gas discovery, although it was not commercially developed. The drilling provided subsurface information about the central Sydney Basin, including the sequence of Triassic sedimentary rocks underlying the Fairfield–Wakeley area.

== Demographics ==
The largest ancestry in the suburb is Vietnamese 17.6%, followed by Assyrian 16.2% and Chinese 13.1%. English only is used at home by 21.2% of residents compared to an average 67.6% in New South Wales. The most common languages spoken after English are Vietnamese 17.9%, Assyrian-Neo Aramaic 15.1%, and Arabic 7.1%.

37.9% of people in Wakeley were born in Australia compared to an average 65.4% in New South Wales. The most common places of birth after Australia are Iraq 16%, Vietnam 14%, and Cambodia 4.2%.

== Schools ==
- King Park Public School
- Mary MacKillop College, which is run by the Sisters of St Joseph

== Churches ==
The Christ The Good Shepherd Church, located in the suburb, was opened in 2015 by its head priest Mar Mari Emmanuel, a metropolitan bishop of Australia and New Zealand. The bishop was stabbed at the church on 15 April 2024, but survived the attack.
