= Edensor Park =

- Suburb
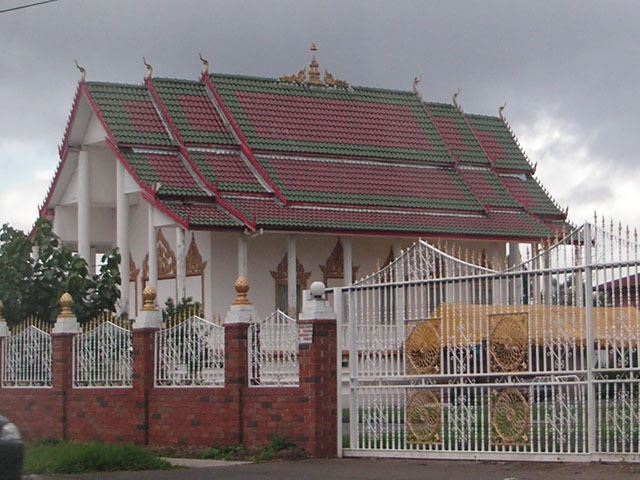
- Wat Prayortkeo Dhammayanaram Buddhist temple

- Interactive map of Edensor Park
- Country: Australia
- State: New South Wales
- City: Sydney
- LGA: City of Fairfield
- Location: 38 km (24 mi) west of Sydney CBD
- Established: 1970s

Government
  - State electorate: Cabramatta
  - Federal division: Fowler
- Elevation: 68 m (223 ft)

Population
  - Total: 10,279 (2021 census)
- Postcode: 2176
Suburbs around Edensor Park
Abbotsbury	Bossley Park	Greenfield Park
Abbotsbury	Edensor Park	Bonnyrigg
Cecil Hills	Bonnyrigg Heights	Bonnyrigg

Edensor Park is a suburb of Sydney, New South Wales, Australia. Edensor Park is located 38 kilometres west of the Sydney central business district in the local government area of the City of Fairfield. It is mainly a residential area, Edensor Park is part of the Greater Western Sydney region.

== History ==
John Brown Bossley (1810–1872) came to Australia around 1838 and practised as a chemist in Sydney. Bossley built an English styled farmhouse on his land near Clear Paddock Creek. He called the property Edensor, after a village near Chatsworth in Derbyshire, England. This established the name Edensor Park after Edensor House. Edensor Park and its surrounding suburbs was a rural area until the 1970s, when it was developed into a residential settlement. Edensor Park belonged to the Prospect County Council, before its amalgamation into Fairfield City Council.

== Commercial area ==
Edensor Park is a mainly residential suburb served by a local shopping centre, Edensor Park Plaza, which features a Coles supermarket and a number of convenient stores and delis.

== Schools ==
Edensor Park is served by two primary schools Edensor Park Public School and Governor Philip King Public School and three high schools outside the suburb.

== Sport and recreation ==
Edensor Park has a number of recreation areas including Angle Vale Reserve, Allambie Reserve and Bosnjak Park. It is also home to the Sydney United Sports Centre, home of the Croatian backed football (soccer) team, Sydney United, which was once a member of the now defunct Australian National Soccer League (NSL) and currently plays in the New South Wales Premier League.

Another local sporting team is the CVD Edensor Park Cobras Junior Rugby league Football Club, who play in the Parramatta Junior Rugby League Association and use Bosnjak Park as their home ground. Edensor Park is also home to the Nineveh Club, the first Assyrian social club to be built in Australia. The club was constructed in the early 1970s using ancient Assyrian features and is distinguished by two winged bulls at the entrance. Edensor Park contains several parks and reserves, including Bosnjak Park, Moorhouse Park, Busby Park and Allambie Park. Edensor Creek flows through these parklands, with the creek and its surrounding riparian vegetation forming a continuous green corridor through the suburb.

== Population ==
Edensor Park residents are culturally diverse, with ethnic backgrounds from the Middle East, Europe and Asia.

According to the 2021 Census 43.8% of people were born in Australia. The next most common countries of birth were Iraq 17.9%, Vietnam 7.8%, Cambodia 2.5%, Syria 2.4% and Italy 2.3%. The most common ancestries were Assyrian 12.8%, Italian 10.6%, Vietnamese 10.4%, Australian 9.2% and Chinese 8.4%. 28.1% of people spoke only English at home. Other languages spoken at home included Neo-Aramaic 18.7% (Assyrian 12.2% and Chaldean Neo-Aramaic 6.5%), Vietnamese 10.3%, Arabic 8.5% and Croatian 3.6%.

The most common responses for religion were Catholic 45.1%, Buddhism 13.1%, No Religion 9.7%, Assyrian Church of the East 7.0% and Not stated 5.1%. Christianity was the largest religious group at 70.9%.
