= Brook (stream) =

Small natural stream

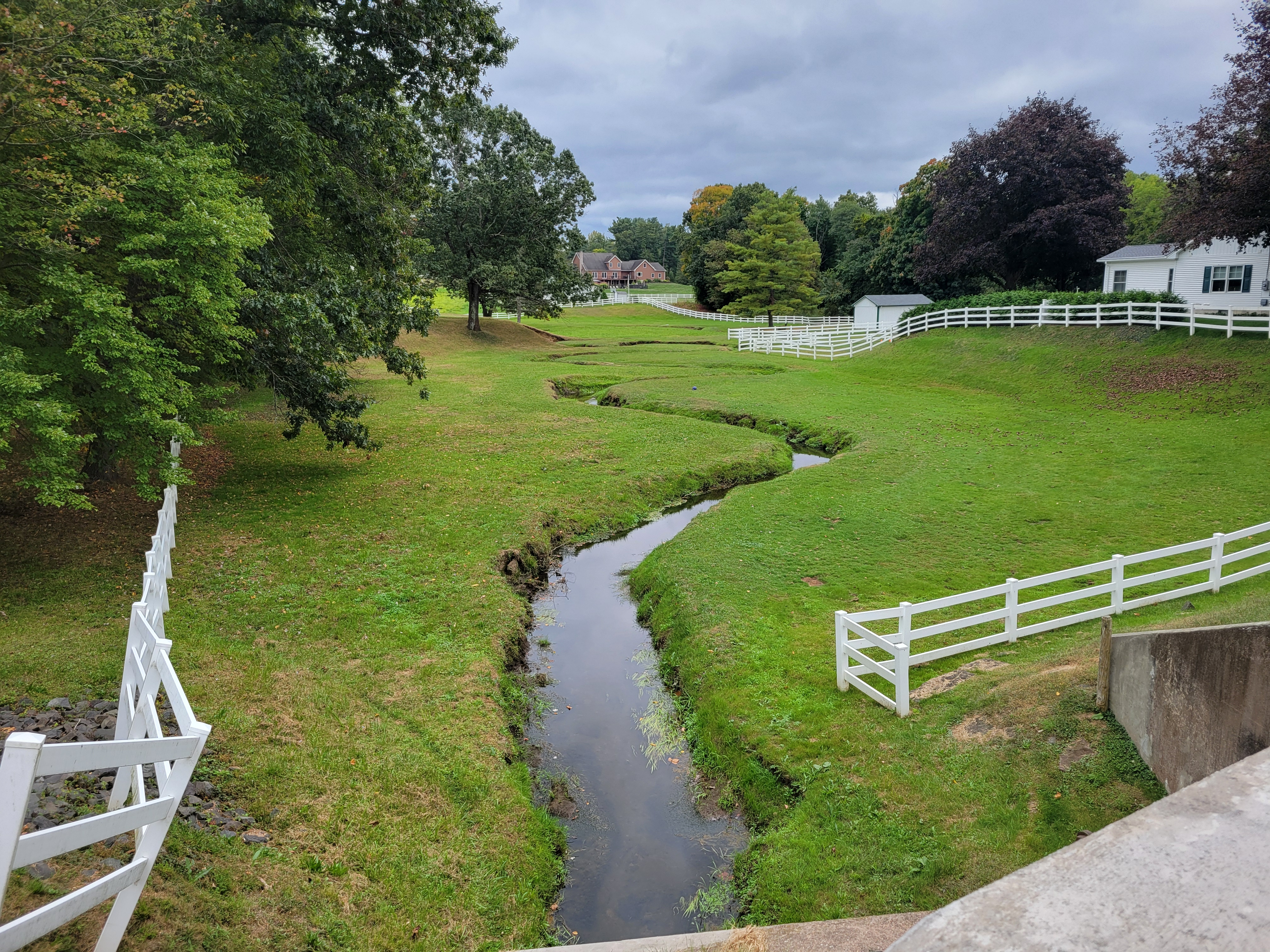
Stoughton's Brook flowing through South Windsor, Connecticut, United States.

A brook is a small natural stream or watercourse, sometimes also referred to as a rivulet. It is typically shallow and carries less water than larger streams and rivers. The term is sometimes used particularly for a stream that originates from a spring or seep. The distinction between a brook and other small watercourses, particularly a creek, is not precisely defined. The names given to flowing watercourses vary according to regional usage, historical naming conventions and local geography, and there is no universally accepted width, depth or discharge at which a brook becomes a creek or river. Particularly small brooks may also be known as rills or streamlets.

The amount of water carried by a brook can fluctuate considerably. Brooks generally consist of flowing freshwater confined within a relatively narrow natural channel. Despite their small size, brooks and other small headwater streams can form important freshwater ecosystems. Small headwater streams also influence the ecology of larger waterways. Brooks with intermittent or ephemeral flow can support communities adapted to alternating wet and dry conditions. Small streams comparable to modern brooks were used by ancient communities for water supply, drainage and other practical purposes. Small watercourses have also served as geographical landmarks and territorial boundaries.

== Terminology ==
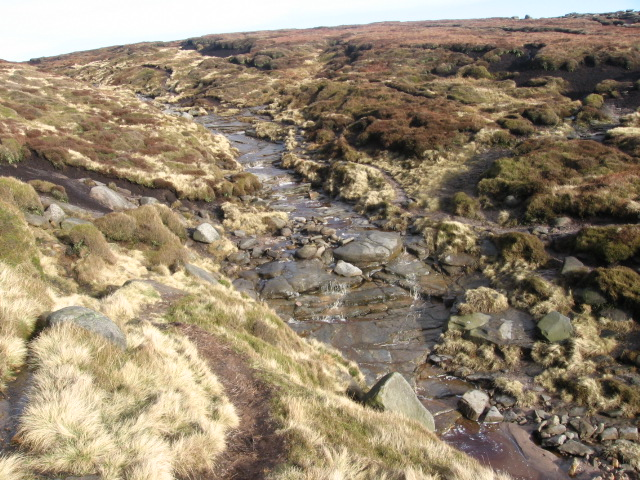
A shallow brook flowing through moorland in England.

The English noun brook derives from Old English brōc, meaning a stream or watercourse. Cognates occur in other Germanic languages. The word has been used in English for small natural watercourses since before the 12th century. The word occurs frequently in English toponymy, particularly in the names of small watercourses and settlements associated with them.

The terms brook, creek, stream and rivulet overlap considerably and their meanings differ between regions. In hydrology, stream can be used as a general term for flowing water irrespective of size. The United States Geological Survey defines a brook simply as a "small stream". In some usage, a brook is regarded as smaller than a creek and is particularly associated with a shallow stream that can be crossed easily. Brooks may also be associated with watercourses issuing from springs or seeps. These characteristics are conventions rather than universally recognised hydrological criteria.

Creek has particularly variable geographical meanings. In Australia, Canada, New Zealand and the United States, it commonly denotes a small stream or tributary, whereas in British English it commonly refers to a narrow inlet or bay, particularly of the sea, for example Wootton Creek. Consequently, terms such as brook, creek and river do not necessarily indicate the physical size of a watercourse or correspond to formal hydrological classifications. The United States Geological Survey notes that there are no official definitions distinguishing such generic geographic terms and classifies all linear flowing bodies of water as streams, regardless of whether their names contain terms such as creek, river or run.

== History and culture ==
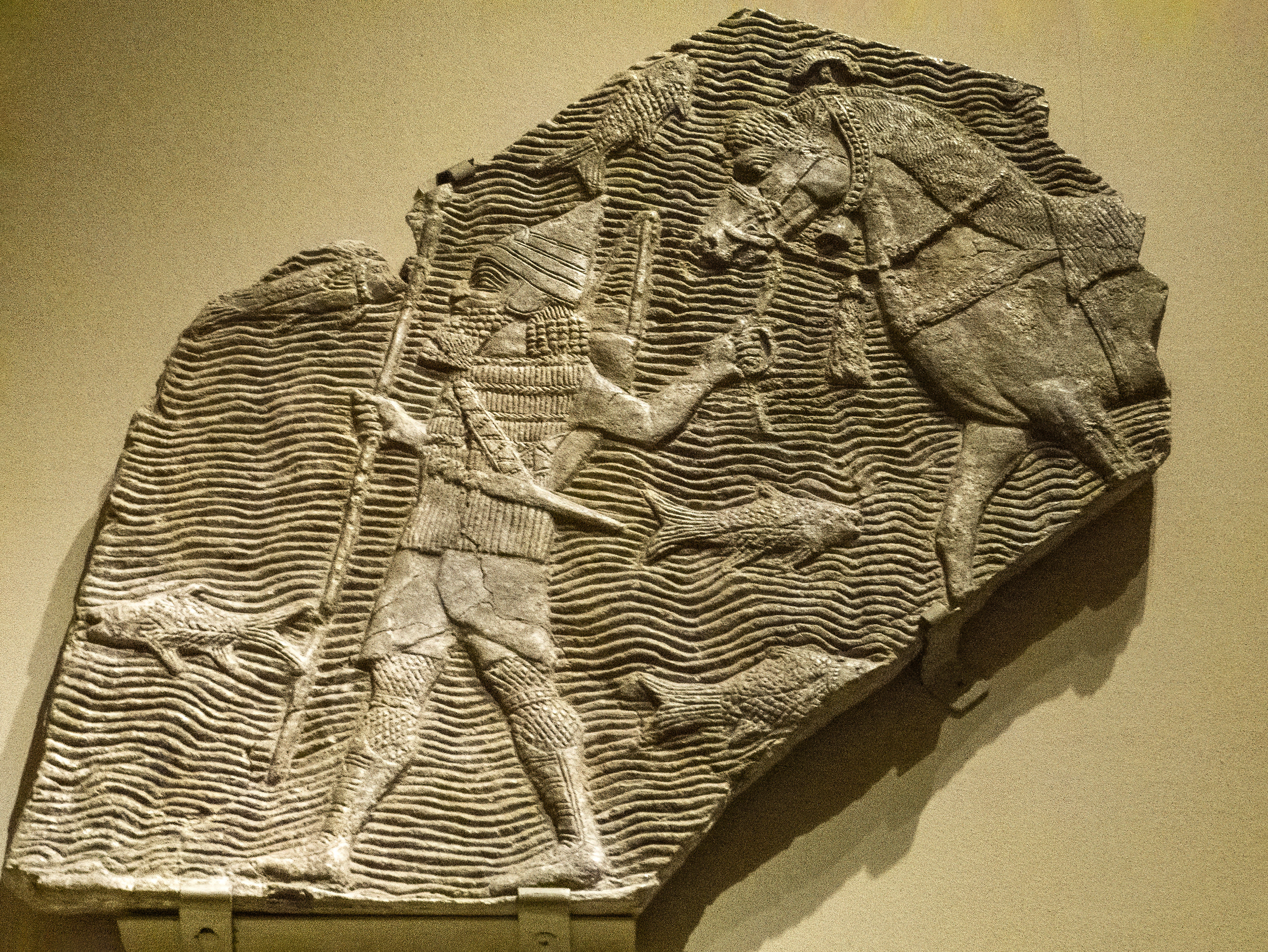
Neo-Assyrian relief depicting a cavalryman crossing a stream, from the palace of Sennacherib at Nineveh, c. 704–681 BC.

In ancient Assyria, small streams and springs formed part of the wider system of watercourses used for agriculture and settlement. Royal inscriptions of Sennacherib (reigned 705–681 BC) describe the king as one who dug canals, "opened streams" and caused watercourses to flow, supplying irrigation water to the plains and meadows of Assyria. In the 7th century BC, the Assyrian king Esarhaddon referred in his royal inscriptions to the "Brook of Egypt" (Akkadian: naḫal Muṣur) near the Egyptian frontier. One account describes the surrounding region as lacking rivers and having water that had to be drawn by bucket, illustrating the importance of even relatively small watercourses in the arid borderlands of the ancient Near East.

In the Roman Empire, streams could also be incorporated into engineered drainage systems or modified through diversion and channelisation. Archaeological excavations in the Walbrook valley of Roman London, for example, have revealed early Roman water channels with engineered gradients and timber-revetted sides, interpreted as having been used for drainage and the disposal of effluent. Some small streams also acquired cultural or religious significance. In Ancient Rome, the Amnis Petronia was a spring-fed brook that flowed from the Quirinal Hill across the Campus Martius into the Tiber. Roman magistrates ceremonially crossed the brook after taking the auspices when travelling to conduct official business on the Campus Martius, a practice associated with a form of augury known as peremne.

Small streams were also exploited for water power. At Nettleton, Wiltshire, archaeological remains of a Romano-British waterwheel installation were discovered in the banks of Broadmead Brook. The surviving wheel emplacement indicates that a waterwheel approximately 2.6 m (8.5 ft) in diameter operated at the site. In more recent history, brooks and other small streams were used as local sources of water and hydropower. Where sufficient flow and gradient were available, their water could be impounded in mill ponds and diverted to operate water wheels. Bentley Brook in Derbyshire, for example, powered a concentration of mills in the Lumsdale Valley over several centuries, including mills used for grinding animal bones and other industrial processes. Brooks could also form part of local water-supply and drainage systems. In Perth, Western Australia, land at the mouth of Claise Brook was reserved for a water mill in 1848, while water draining into the brook was later used by residents living along its banks. Historically, brook has also had regional meanings unrelated to the modern sense of a small stream. In parts of Kent and Sussex, the term was applied to low-lying marshy ground or water-meadows, which did not necessarily contain running water.

Brooks are a recurring feature of pastoral imagery and literature, where their small size and flowing water are commonly associated with rural landscapes and tranquillity; the expression babbling brook is conventionally used to describe the sound of water flowing over a shallow stream. Brooks appear frequently in English poetry. Alfred, Lord Tennyson made a brook the subject and partial narrator of his poem The Brook (1855), using its continuous movement as a contrast with the transience of human life. Brook and Brooke also developed as English surnames, generally as locative names for people who lived near a stream, water-meadow or low marshy ground, or who came from a place named for such a feature. Medieval forms include delbroc, de la Broke and Attebroc, with recorded examples dating from the 12th and 13th centuries.

== Characteristics and modification ==
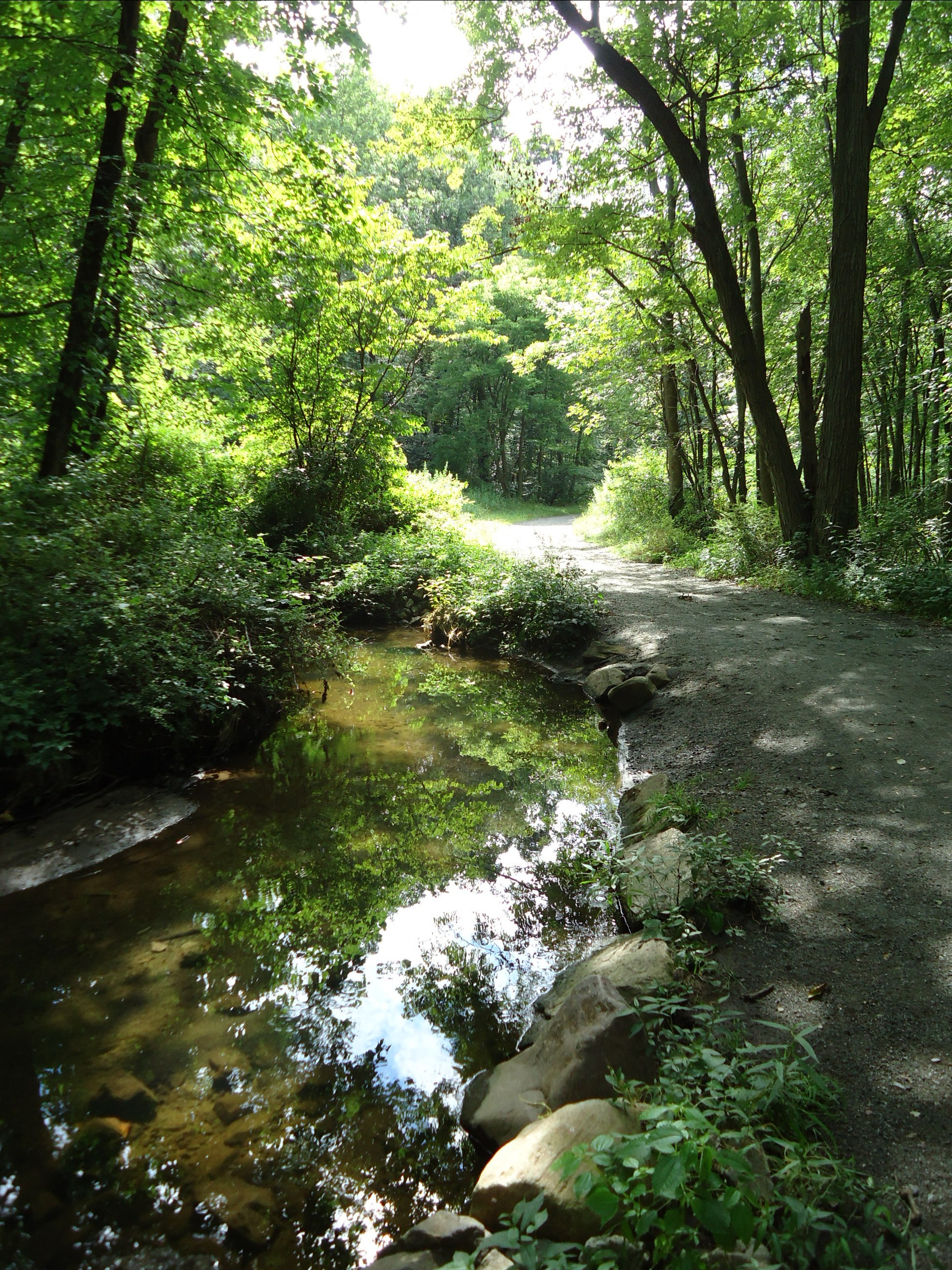
A shallow woodland brook in Loantaka Brook Reservation, Morris County, New Jersey, United States.

They may occur in forests, valleys, uplands and other landscapes and commonly form part of a larger drainage network. Water may originate from groundwater discharged through springs and seeps, surface runoff, rainfall, melting snow, or a combination of these sources. Because the term is descriptive rather than a formal hydrological classification, brooks vary considerably in their physical characteristics. Some flow throughout the year, while others are intermittent or ephemeral. Their beds may consist of bedrock, gravel, stones, sand, silt or organic material depending on local geology, gradient and water velocity. Brooks in steep terrain may have relatively fast currents despite their small size, whereas those on gentler gradients may flow slowly and form shallow pools. Small waterfalls, riffles and pools may occur along their courses.

Artificial stormwater channels may resemble brooks where they are narrow and carry a shallow flow of water, but are generally distinguished by their artificial construction and drainage function. A stormwater channel is a constructed channel designed to convey stormwater or floodwater, whereas a brook is a small natural stream. In urban areas, however, the distinction may be less visually apparent where natural streams have been modified or incorporated into stormwater systems. In Sydney, a number of natural creeks were historically channelised with concrete as part of the city's stormwater network; some have subsequently been naturalised by removing concrete and restoring more natural channel features.

=== Fords and culverts ===
Because brooks are typically small and shallow, they may be crossed at a ford, a shallow section of a watercourse where the bed can be traversed without a bridge. Natural fords commonly occur where the channel is relatively wide and shallow and the bed is sufficiently firm, such as where it consists of gravel or rock. Historically, fords across brooks and other small streams were important crossing points for footpaths, roads and livestock routes. The suitability of a brook for fording can vary with its discharge. A ford that is readily passable during normal or dry conditions may become difficult or dangerous to cross following heavy rainfall, when the depth and velocity of the water increase.

Brooks may pass through culverts where roads, paths or other infrastructure cross the watercourse. Culverts route streamflow beneath the crossing and are commonly constructed from materials such as metal, concrete or plastic. Unlike a bridge, a culvert generally confines the stream within an enclosed or partly enclosed structure for the length of the crossing. Poorly designed or positioned culverts can alter stream conditions and restrict the movement of fish and other aquatic organisms.

== Formation and hydrology ==
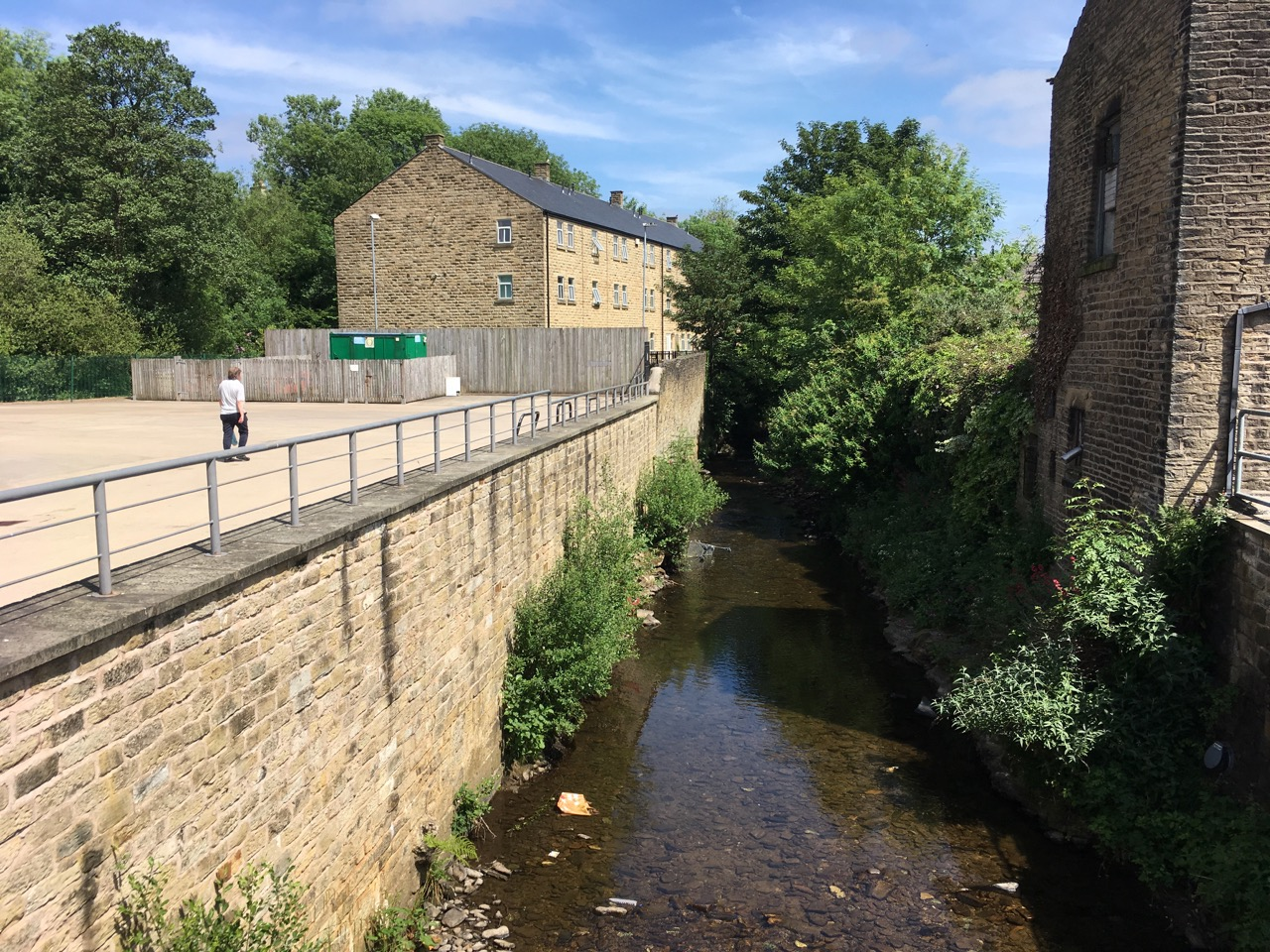
Glossop Brook, an urban brook flowing through Glossop, Derbyshire, England.

Brooks form where water becomes concentrated within a natural channel. Some begin where groundwater reaches the surface at a spring or seep. Others originate from surface runoff collecting in depressions and drainage channels, particularly following rainfall or snowmelt. A brook may constitute one of the smallest components of a larger drainage system. Multiple small channels can converge to form progressively larger streams, which may themselves become tributaries of rivers. There is, however, no universal point at which a brook is considered sufficiently large to be termed a creek or another type of stream.

Perennial brooks are maintained throughout much or all of the year, often through groundwater discharge, whereas intermittent brooks may cease flowing during dry periods. Short-lived channels produced primarily by rainfall or snowmelt may be ephemeral. Brooks may occupy or flow through gullies, which are small channels or hollows formed by the erosive action of running water. Unlike a brook, which is a small stream, a gully refers primarily to the eroded landform and commonly carries water only following rainfall or snowmelt.

Brooks have no universally recognised hydrological dimensions separating them from other types of streams, with their width and depth varying according to factors such as discharge, catchment size and local topography. They are generally associated with small or headwater streams; a review of small water bodies in Great Britain and Ireland characterised headwater streams as typically less than 3 m (9.8 ft) wide. Individual brooks may nevertheless be considerably larger: Tweedie Brook in New Brunswick had an average wetted width of 8 m (26 ft) and an average water depth of 27 cm (11 in), while surveyed sections of Murray Brook in Nova Scotia were approximately 3 to 3.5 m (9.8 to 11.5 ft) wide and averaged 15 cm (5.9 in) deep.

== Ecology ==
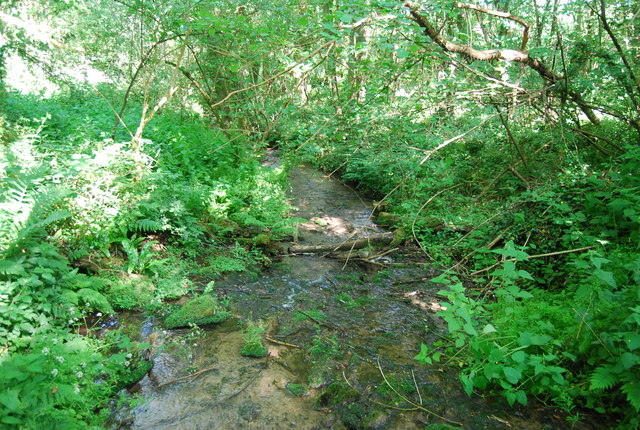
A shallow woodland brook in Plaxtol, Kent, England.

Brooks and surrounding riparian zones provide habitat for aquatic and terrestrial organisms, including fish, amphibians, crustaceans and aquatic insects. Although individual headwater streams occupy relatively small areas, collectively they can constitute a large proportion of the total length of a river network and contribute substantially to its biological diversity. Shaded woodland brooks may remain relatively cool because surrounding riparian vegetation reduces direct solar radiation. Trees and other vegetation along stream banks also contribute leaf litter and woody debris to the water, providing food resources, cover and habitat for aquatic organisms. In heavily shaded headwaters, limited sunlight can restrict primary production, making terrestrial organic matter such as fallen leaves an especially important source of energy. Leaves are colonised and decomposed by microorganisms and consumed by aquatic invertebrates, allowing terrestrial carbon and nutrients to enter the stream food web.

The relative isolation and environmental conditions of headwaters can produce biological communities that differ from those of larger downstream streams. Some species are permanent residents, while others enter headwaters only during particular seasons or stages of their life cycle. Small headwaters may also provide refuges from predators or competitors occurring in larger streams, particularly where waterfalls, steep gradients or other barriers restrict the movement of larger fish. Such isolation can contribute to the persistence of specialised or geographically restricted species. Amphibians can be particularly important inhabitants of small woodland streams. Some salamanders and frogs spend their entire lives in or near headwaters, while others use them primarily for breeding or during their aquatic larval stages. In fishless streams, amphibians may become important vertebrate predators, feeding on aquatic invertebrates and influencing their abundance and community composition.

As surface flow contracts, remaining pools and moist sediments may provide temporary refuges for aquatic organisms until flow resumes, while some species survive dry periods through resistant life stages or by retreating into the streambed. Despite periods without continuous surface water, intermittent streams can continue to provide wildlife habitat, transport nutrients and sediment, and connect terrestrial and aquatic environments. Organic matter, woody material and invertebrates entering small streams can be transported downstream, where they provide resources for downstream aquatic communities. Conversely, aquatic insects emerging from streams can transfer energy and nutrients into surrounding terrestrial habitats and provide prey for animals such as birds, bats and spiders. Headwaters also affect downstream water chemistry by processing, retaining and transporting dissolved nutrients and other substances within the drainage network. Because of their small channels and close connection with the surrounding landscape, brooks and headwater streams can be particularly sensitive to environmental disturbance. Removal of riparian vegetation can increase sunlight and water temperature and reduce inputs of organic material, while urbanisation, channelisation, burial in pipes, sedimentation and changes to catchment hydrology can substantially alter or eliminate headwater habitat.

== See also ==
- Beck (stream)
- Riffle
- Spring (hydrology)
- Tributary
