= Sydney Freshwater Wetlands =

Ecoregion in New South Wales, Australia

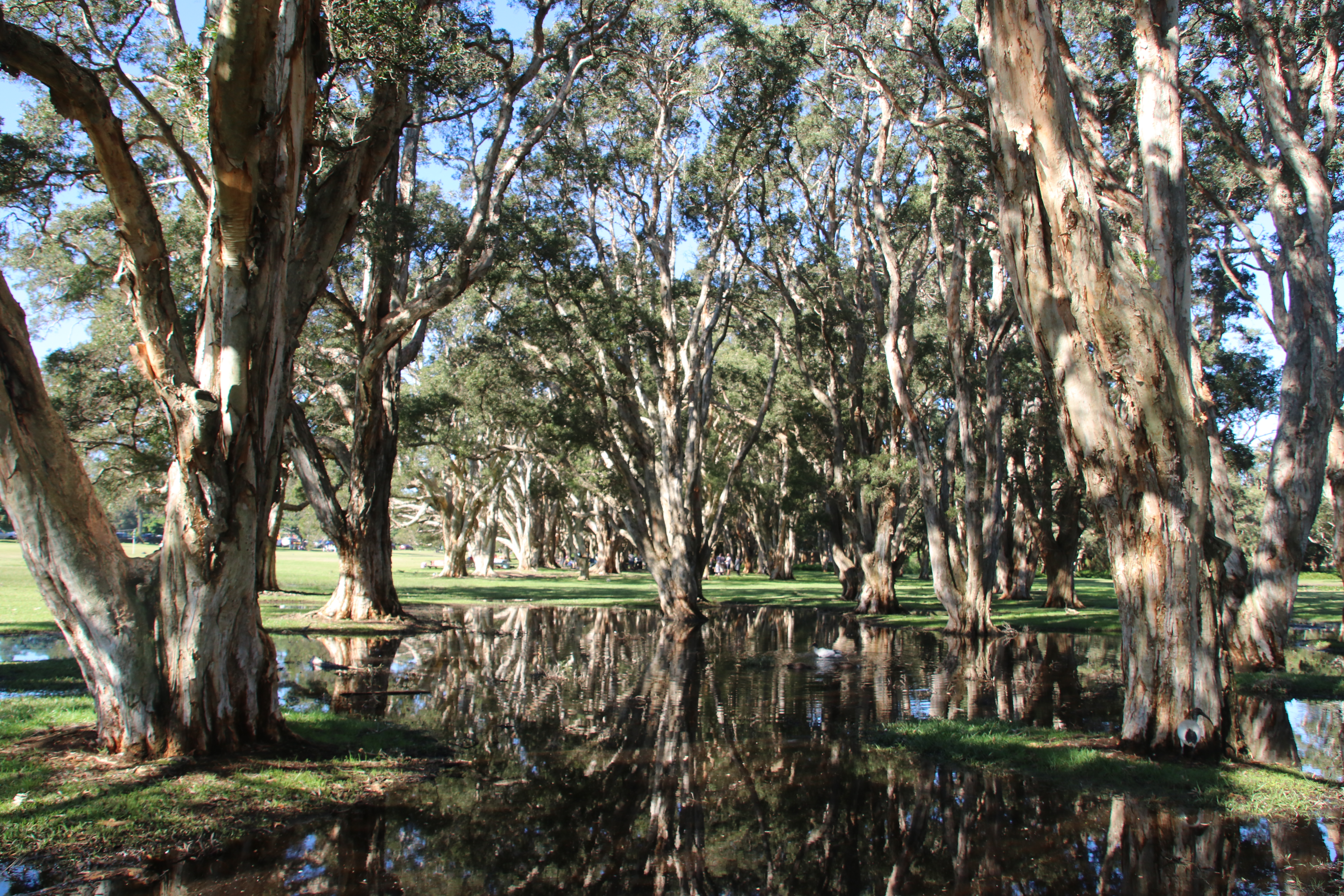
- Lachlan Swamp at Centennial Park, Sydney

Ecology
- Realm: Australasia
- Biome: Flooded grasslands and savannas
- Borders: Cumberland Plain Woodland; Sydney Turpentine-Ironbark Forest

Geography
- Country: Australia
- Elevation: 10–30 metres (33–98 ft)
- Coordinates: 33.9355°S 151.2122°E
- Climate type: Humid subtropical climate (Cfa); Oceanic climate (Cfb)
- Soil types: Sandy loam, peat

Sydney Freshwater Wetlands are an endangered wetland community found within the Sydney Basin. They typically consist of freshwater swamps found in sunken marshes and sunken landforms on dunes and poor nutrient sandplain locations on the coast, which may vary significantly due to erratic water levels and seasonal conditions. Sydney Freshwater Wetlands are part of the Freshwater wetlands on coastal floodplains of the NSW North Coast, Sydney Basin and South East Corner bioregion.

== History ==
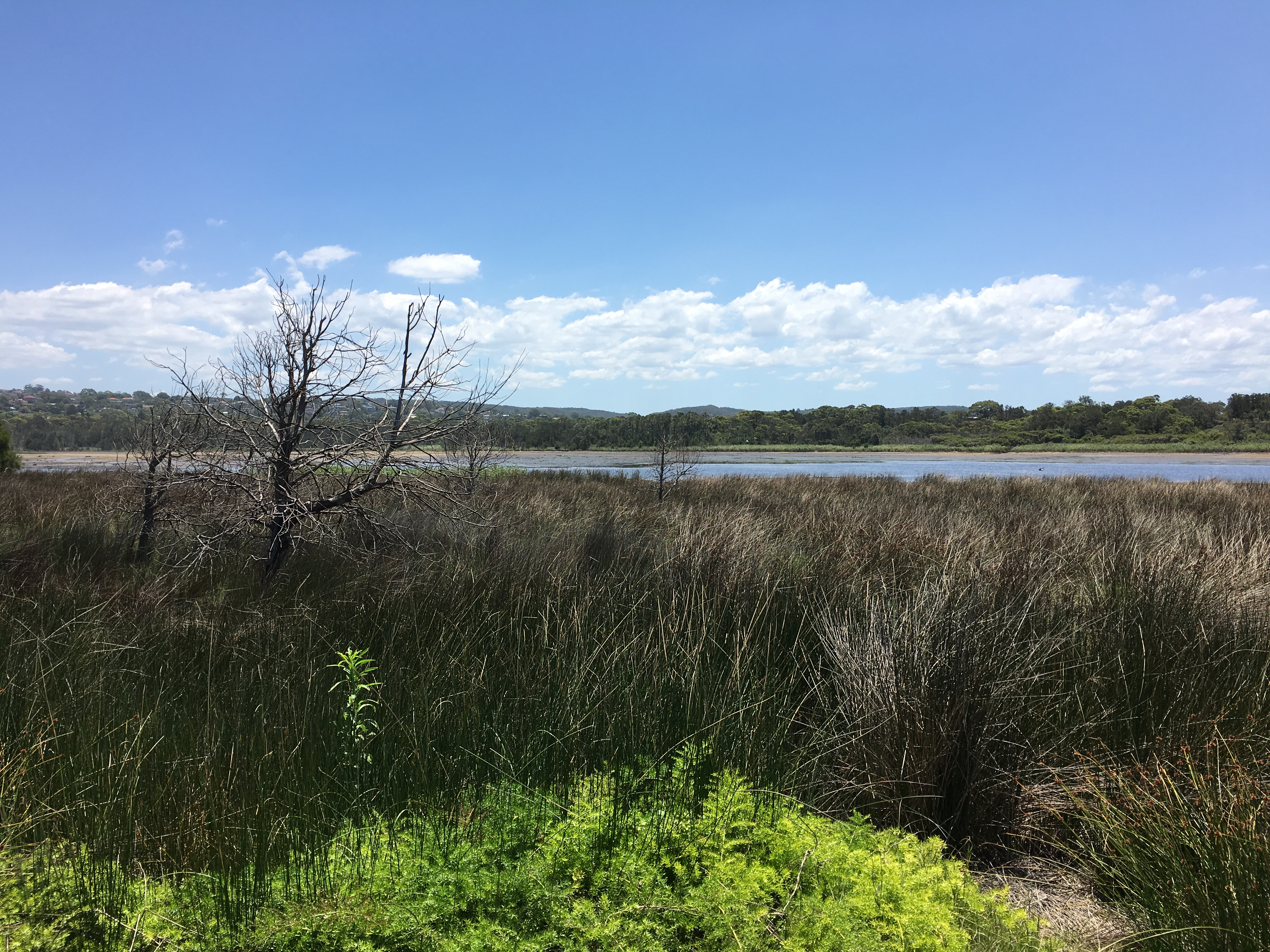
Dee Why lagoon

Historically, Sydney Freshwater Wetlands used to drain south from Sydney CBD to Botany Bay in a succession of ponds and channels before becoming reduced during the 19th century. Early British colonial period exhibited a map of southern Sydney that showed wetland boundaries. Recollections from 1833 and 1834 of aquatic plants growing in the Botany Wetlands and Waterloo Swamps have provided insight on the wetlands in the early 19th century. Desolate sandy hills and slopes dispersed in the early 19th century wetlands are continuously described "scrub", "brushwood" and "stunted timber", which suggests that the prevalent existence of a low, woody plant community in the wetlands. Today, Lachlan Swamp (at Centennial Parklands) and the Botany Water Reserves are the only two protected zones of the wetlands.

== Distribution ==
Present on the sands of the Warriewood and Tuggerah Soil Landscapes, the wetlands are found within the regions of City of Botany Bay, Gosford City Council, Lake Macquarie, Wyong, Northern Beaches Council, Warringah Council, Municipality of Woollahra, Bayside Council, City of Randwick, Sutherland, City of Wollongong and Waverley Council. They were once uniquely widespread in the Sydney's eastern suburbs and the Kurnell area.

More specifically, they occur in areas such as Jewells Swamp, De Freitas Wetland, Wallarah wetland, Budgewoi wetlands, Botany Swamps at Eastlakes, La Perouse, Porters Creek, Deep Creek Warringah, Kurnell lagoons, Bundeena, Marley Lagoons at Marley Beach, Wyong Golf Course, Tuggerah Oxbow, Bateau Bay, Iluka Lagoon, Everglades Lagoon, Wyrrabalong National Park, Dee Why Lagoon, Lachlan Swamps, Centennial Park, and Coomaditchy Lagoon.

== Ecology ==
Vegetation include sedges and aquatic plants such as, Eleocharis sphacelata, Baumea juncea, Baumea rubiginosa, Baumea articulata, Gahnia sieberiana, Ludwigia peploides and Persicaria sp. There are some areas of open water specifically where drainage circumstances have been modified, and as well as spots of emerging tree species such as Melaleuca quinquenervia.

Non-aquatic plant species include:

- Banksia robur
- Callistemon citrinus
- Casuarina glauca
- Cladium procerum
- Cycnogeton procerum
- Eleocharis sphacelata
- Empodisma minus
- Gahnia clarkei
- Gleichenia dicarpa
- Goodenia paniculata
- Hakea teretifolia
- Hypolepis muelleri
- Lepironia articulata
- Leptocarpus tenax
- Leptospermum juniperinum
- Lomandra longifolia
- Melaleuca linariifolia
- Melaleuca nodosa
- Melaleuca styphelioides
- Persicaria decipiens
- Philydrum lanuginosum
- Phragmites australis
- Pteridium esculentum
- Restio tetraphyllus
- Schoenus brevifolius
- Typha orientalis
- Villarsia exaltata
- Viminaria juncea
- Xanthorrhoea resinifera

Faunal species include the Australasian bittern, wallum froglet, green and golden bell frog, Myotis macropus and Myotis adversus.

== Threats ==
The wetlands have been widely cleared for recreational objectives. Moreover, remnants of the wetlands are endangered with illegal dumping that include industrial and residential waste, stolen vehicle dumping, sand extraction and clearing for urban development. Oher threats are urban runoffs connected with vicinity to urban and agricultural areas, and weed invasion of plants like Cortaderia selloana, Ludwigia peruviana, Salvinia molesta and Eichhornia crassipes, including animals like the introduction of deer. The Scientific Committee has opined that the wetlands are likely to become extinct.

== See also ==
- Coastal Upland Swamps, swamps on elevated sandstone areas
