= De Freitas Wetland =

Wetland in Western Sydney, Australia

- de Freitas Wetland
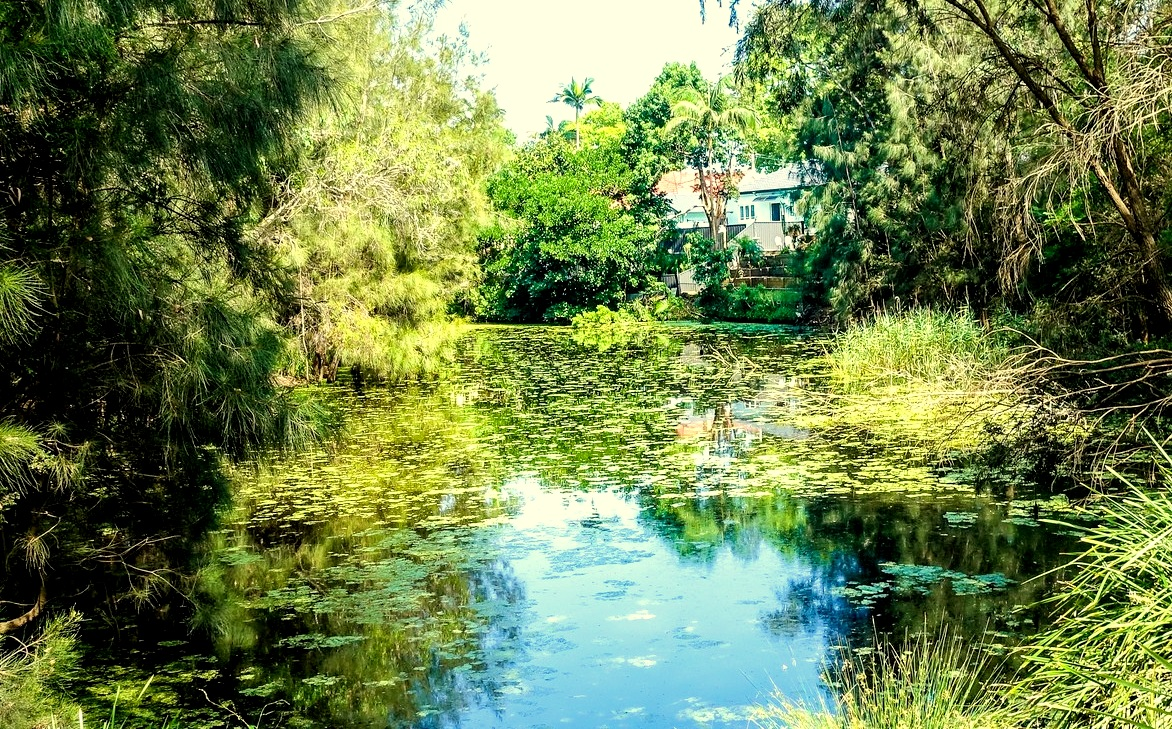

- Location in New South Wales
- Interactive map of De Freitas Wetland
- Location: Fairfield, Western Sydney, Australia
- Coordinates: 33°52′24″S 150°57′37″E
- Type: Freshwater wetland and swamp
- Primary inflows: local surface runoff
- Primary outflows: overflows into Prospect Creek
- Catchment area: Georges River
- Basin countries: Australia
- Max. length: 185 m (607 ft)
- Max. width: 15 m (49 ft)
- Surface area: 0.43 km^{2} (0.17 sq mi)
- Average depth: 1 m (3 ft 3 in)
- Surface elevation: 10 m (33 ft)

De Freitas Wetland is a wetland situated in Fairfield, New South Wales, Australia. Located in Western Sydney and associated with Prospect Creek, it is a freshwater swamp that has an ecological significance and a moderate conservation value. The swampland provides to the area's biodiversity but faces problems such as invasive vegetation and erosion.

== History ==
The wetland plays a significant role in Fairfield's history and was most likely formed by being cut off from Prospect Creek as it meandered. From the 1920s, the wetland was owned by Joseph De Freitas and his family, who established a nursery garden and orchard in the area, until Fairfield City Council purchased it in 1995. After its opening to the public, extensive rehabilitation, habitat creation and revegetation became ongoing on the swamp, although remnants of De Freitas' garden still remain on the site. Fairfield City's original wetlands were widely drained for farming purposes after European settlement in the area. However, much recently, the value of these wetlands were acknowledged for flood mitigation and their biodiversity.

In 2013, the wetland was classified under Zone C2 (Environmental Conservation) by the DCCEEW, a category applied to an area with high conservation value and protection level, which is just below national parks.

== Geography ==
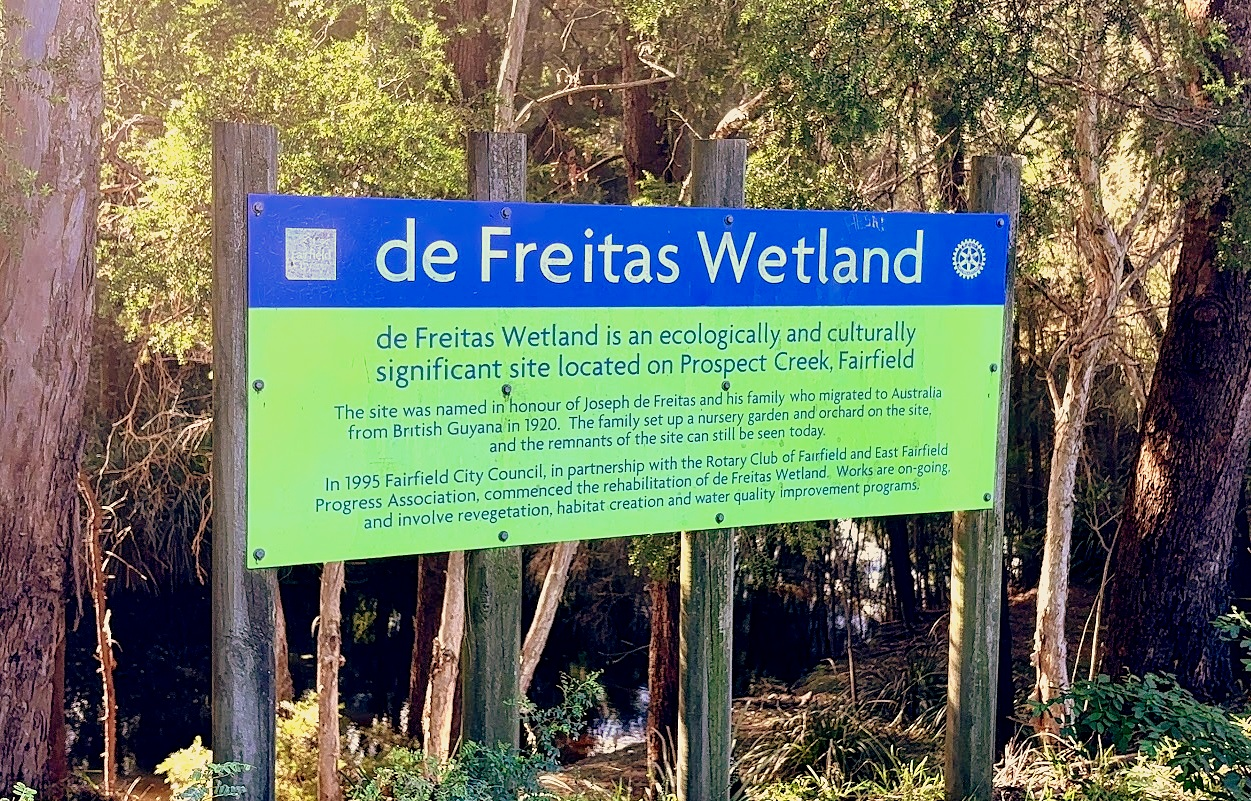
The wetland's signboard

Located in Vine Street, between Fairfield Precinct Park and Patrician Brothers' College, De Freitas Wetland has been reconstructed, although it is a natural and historical billabong, as it has been present in 1943 aerial images, unlike many others in the area. The swamp is situated west of Prospect Creek and is adjacent to Makepeace Oval to the southeast, in addition to residential buildings to its north. The Horsley Drive is the major road proximate to the swamp on the east. Moreover, it is the only remaining natural wetland on Prospect Creek south of Prospect Reservoir. In the Fairfield area, wetlands are beginning to increase with the establishment of stormwater retention basins.

=== Ecology ===
The wetland is part of the Freshwater Wetlands on Coastal Floodplains ecoregion, specifically Sydney Freshwater Wetlands, which belong to the NSW North Coast, Sydney Basin and the South East Corner bioregions, which are listed as endangered ecological communities under the Threatened Species Conservation Act 1995 of New South Wales.

No listed threatened flora species are found in this ecosystem, though various locally important species may be present, such as, Cladium procerum, Carex fascicularis and Brasenia schreberi. Since it is part of a creek system (Prospect Creek), the swamp predominantly features Casuarina glauca and is within the Coastal Swamp Oak Forest and River-flat eucalypt forest biomes. Red-eared slider turtles are an invasive species found at the swamp, and visitors are advised to report their presence.

== Restoration ==
In 2011, the council began restoring De Freitas Wetland, which included removal of aquatic weeds and decades of amassed sediments (around 2300 m^{3}). Gross pollutant traps were placed on stormwater pipes that entered the wetland, in addition to over 10,000 native wetland plants (particularly from the River-flat eucalypt forest community) that were planted to increase water quality and offer habitat for the native wildlife therein. In December 2011, volunteers planted around 5,500 plant tube stock, with the rest being planted by bush regeneration contractors in February and March 2012. The council spent $1.2 million for the restoration, which was funded by the Council's Stormwater Levy Program. The council also installed tree logs and rock spalls on the banks.

In September 2013, Patrician Brothers College students raised awareness of the environmental significance of Prospect Creek by planting over 200 plants on the wetland's downstream areas. Though even after the rejuvenation, negligible regrowth of weeds still does occur. In April 2018, the Council reported the presence of Limnobium laevigatum in the swamp, before it was treated in the following weeks, and was finally absent by June that year.
