= University of Melbourne, Burnley campus =

College in Melbourne, Australia

- Established: 1891; 135 years ago
- Academic affiliations: University of Melbourne

Burnley College, Melbourne, Australia, is one of the oldest Colleges in the country and it specialises in horticulture. Its campus is located within the public Burnley Gardens.

== Establishment ==
The site of Burnley College began as the Richmond Survey Paddock, established in 1936 for grazing Survey Department animals. The Horticultural Society of Victoria was granted 25 acres for gardens in 1860. The gardens opened on 1 January 1863, the official opening being marked by the planting of a Californian Redwood (Sequoia sempervirens), which is now a magnificent tree. After the Horticultural Society of Victoria went bankrupt, the site was transferred to the Victorian Department of Agriculture in 1891, and Australia's first School of Horticulture was established. The initial enrolment was 14 male students. In 1898, the College began teaching part-time classes for women, with 25 women enrolling initially, with full-time enrolment for women began in 1903.

=== Early 20th century ===
In the early 20th century, the college taught not only production and ornamental horticulture but also many areas of agriculture. A Plant Research Laboratory was established in 1929. During World War Two, the Gardens hosted a vegetable growing campaign and temporarily grew opium poppies for use in morphine. Post-war, soldiers were able to undertake horticultural courses as part of the Australian Government's Commonwealth Reconstruction Training Scheme, aiming to reintegrate them into society.

In 1947, a new building was commissioned with funding from the Public Works Department and designed by Percy Everett. It returned to a focus on horticulture, rather than farming, in the 1950s.

== Transfer to the University of Melbourne ==
In 1983, the college was amalgamated with the Department of Agriculture's four other colleges to form the Victorian College of Agriculture and Horticulture (VCAH). An archive of Burnley College's history was established in 1991 as part of the 100th anniversary of the college.

As a result of the 1988 white paper on Higher Education, the VCAH was amalgamated with the University of Melbourne, formally legislated under the University of Melbourne (VCAH) Act 1997. The act granted all (formerly state owned) property and assets of the VCAH to the University of Melbourne, and also transferred all obligations of the VCAH to the university.

In the mid-1990s, there were over 2000 students enrolled at the college. In 1994, 224 students graduated, 75 of whom were from the longest-running course, the Advanced Diploma in Horticulture. At the time the university took control, courses ranged from introductory short courses in horticulture, through Apprentice training, TAFE courses, the Advanced Diploma, and a Bachelor of Applied Science in Horticulture. There was also a Graduate Certificate and postgraduate research at Master's and PhD levels. There were 35 academic staff, and approximately 40 technical, administrative and ancillary staff.

=== 21st century ===
The university phased out the TAFE courses, in line with the "Melbourne Model". Current courses run at the campus include; Doctor of Philosophy (by research), Master of Philosophy (by research), the Master of Urban Horticulture (course work), the Graduate Certificate in Arboriculture, the Graduate Certificate in Garden Design, the Specialist Certificate in Green Roofs and Walls and the associate degree in Urban Horticulture.

Burnley College is now much more focused on postgraduate research than in the past, specialising in areas such as green infrastructure, forest science, waterways ecology and management, environmental horticulture and has a significant soil science research group on campus. Facilities include a specialist library, plant nursery, field research and demonstration area, graphics studio, horticultural engineering facilities and plant tissue culture and genetics laboratories.

In 2007, the Burnley Horticultural College Collection was donated to the University of Melbourne archives, containing approximately 7,000 plant specimens.

== Burnley Gardens ==
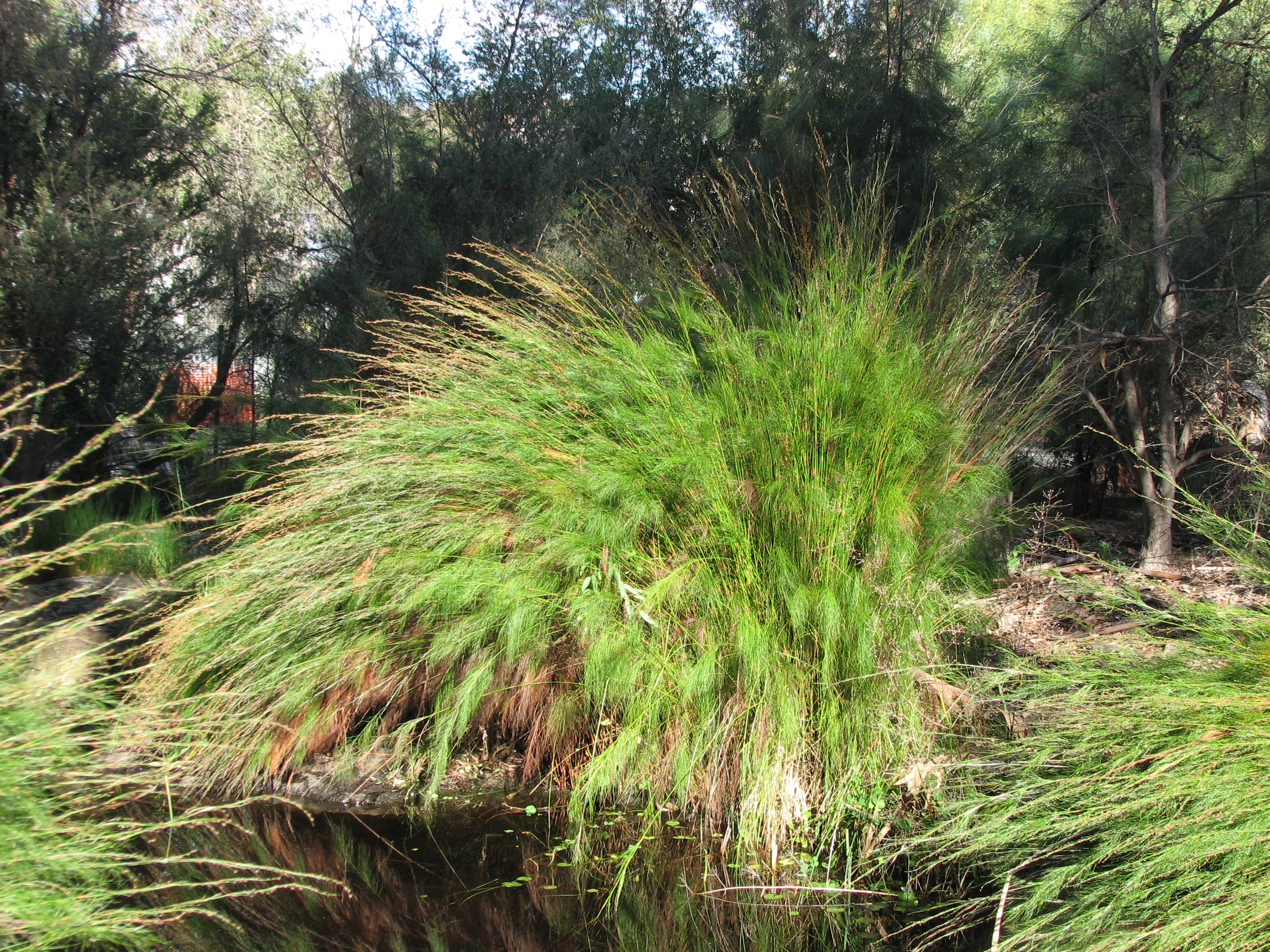
Baloskion tetraphyllum (cultivated), Burnley Gardens, Victoria, Australia.

The Gardens are open to students and visitors alike. The open lawns, curved paths, secluded areas and large conifers providing architectural form combine to make a classic Victorian Garden. Recent developments, such as the Native Grasslands Garden and the Rainforest Garden, have provided new design themes for the gardens.

The Friends of Burnley Gardens were formed in 1998 to support the Gardens. They hold regular meetings and lectures, working bees, workshops and produce a newsletter for members.

In 1995, a large part of the Gardens that contained orchards, fields, and some buildings was sold to the pharmaceutical company AMRAD. The importance of the Burnley Gardens to the State of Victoria was recognised when the gardens were added to the Victorian Heritage Register on 5 December 2003.
