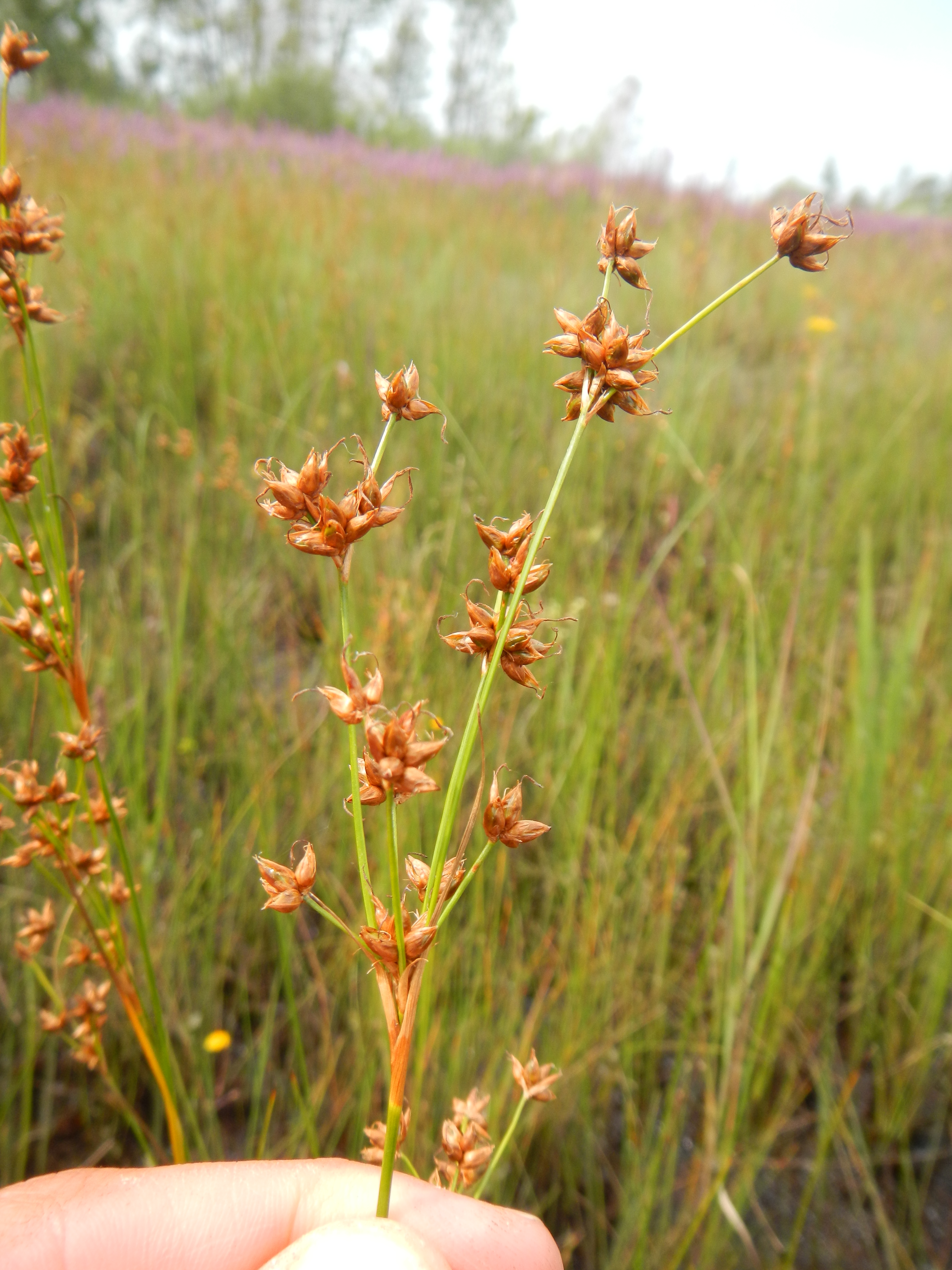

Scientific classification
- Kingdom: Plantae
- Clade: Embryophytes
- Clade: Tracheophytes
- Clade: Angiosperms
- Clade: Monocots
- Clade: Commelinids
- Order: Poales
- Family: Cyperaceae
- Genus: Cladium
- Species: C. mariscoides

Binomial name
- Cladium mariscoides (Muhl.) Torr.

Synonyms
- Cladium mariscoides f. congestum Fernald; Mariscus mariscoides (Muhl.) Kuntze; Mariscus mariscoides f. congestus (Fernald) Fernald; Schoenus mariscoides Muhl.

= Cladium mariscoides =

Smooth sawgrass

Species of grass-like plant

Cladium mariscoides, called smooth sawgrass, is a plant species native to eastern North America. It has been reported from every US state along the Gulf and Atlantic seashores except Louisiana, as well as every Great Lakes state, plus Vermont, Kentucky and Tennessee. It also occurs in every Canadian province except Alberta and British Columbia. The species generally occurs along the shores of wetlands, including coastal salt marshes.

Cladium mariscoides is a perennial herb spreading by means of underground rhizomes. Culms are up to 100 centimetres (39 in) tall. Leaves are very narrow, less than 3 mm across. Spikelets are chestnut brown, born in a panicle with 1st and 2nd order branching but not 3rd order.
