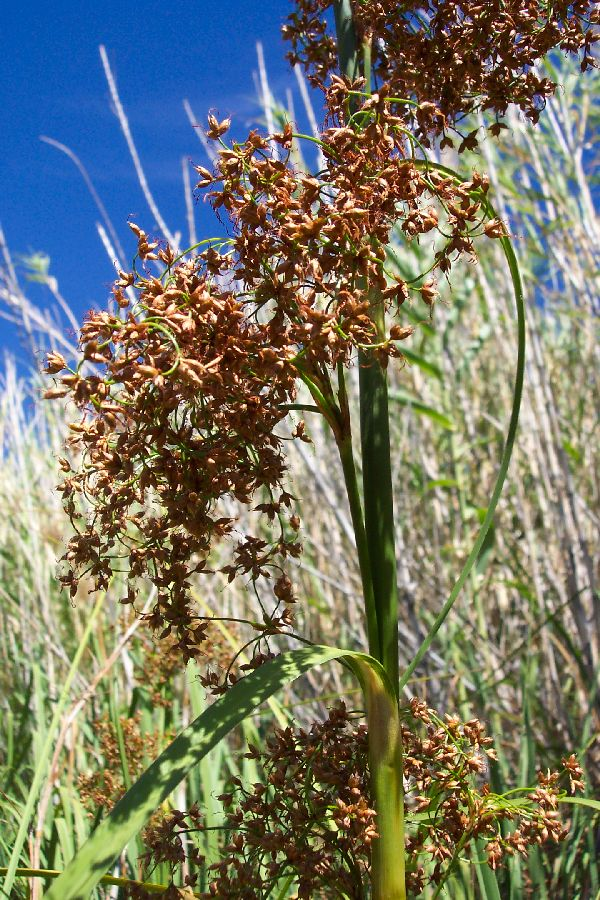

Scientific classification
- Kingdom: Plantae
- Clade: Tracheophytes
- Clade: Angiosperms
- Clade: Monocots
- Clade: Commelinids
- Order: Poales
- Family: Cyperaceae
- Genus: Cladium
- Species: C. californicum

Binomial name
- Cladium californicum (S.Wats.) O'Neill

Synonyms
- C. marsicus var. californicum S.Wats.; C. mariscus subsp. californicum (S. Watson) Govaerts

= Cladium californicum =

Species of grass-like plant

Cladium californicum is a species of flowering plant in the sedge family known as California sawgrass. It is native to the southwestern United States and northern Mexico where it grows in moist areas in a number of habitat types, often in alkaline soils. Cladium californicum is a perennial herb with a hollow, erect, rounded stem 1–2 m (3 ft 3 in – 6 ft 7 in) tall. It grows from rhizomes in dense clumps. The narrow leaves are flat and edged with small, sharp teeth. The inflorescence is a large panicle of spikelets yielding oval-shaped, purplish-brown fruits.
