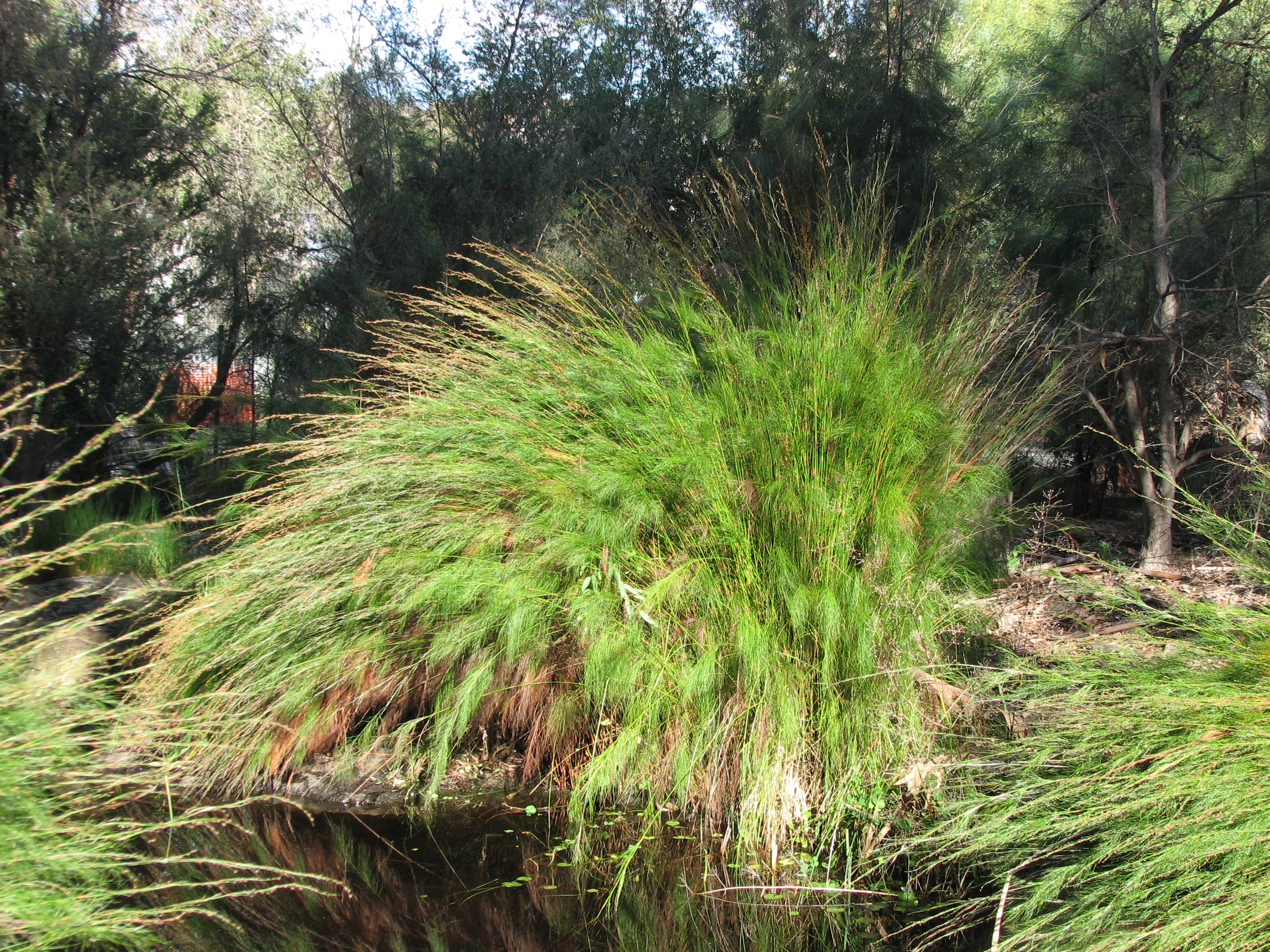
- Baloskion tetraphyllum

Scientific classification
- Kingdom: Plantae
- Clade: Tracheophytes
- Clade: Angiosperms
- Clade: Monocots
- Clade: Commelinids
- Order: Poales
- Family: Restionaceae
- Genus: Baloskion; Raf.

= Baloskion =

Genus of flowering plants

Baloskion is a genus of rush-like plants from Australia.

The genus was first formally described in 1838 by botanist Constantine Samuel Rafinesque. Species include:

- Baloskion australe (R.Br.) B.G.Briggs & L.A.S.Johnson
- Baloskion fimbriatum (L.A.S.Johnson & O.D.Evans) B.G.Briggs & L.A.S.Johnson
- Baloskion gracile (R.Br.) B.G.Briggs & L.A.S.Johnson
- Baloskion longipes (L.A.S.Johnson & O.D.Evans) B.G.Briggs & L.A.S.Johnson
- Baloskion pallens (R.Br.) B.G.Briggs & L.A.S.Johnson
- Baloskion stenocoleum (L.A.S.Johnson & O.D.Evans) B.G.Briggs & L.A.S.Johnson
- Baloskion tenuiculme (S.T.Blake) B.G.Briggs & L.A.S.Johnson
- Baloskion tetraphyllum (Labill.) B.G.Briggs & L.A.S.Johnson
