= Baloskion longipes =

Conservation status
- Vulnerable (EPBC Act)

Scientific classification
- Kingdom: Plantae
- Clade: Embryophytes
- Clade: Tracheophytes
- Clade: Spermatophytes
- Clade: Angiosperms
- Clade: Monocots
- Clade: Commelinids
- Order: Poales
- Family: Restionaceae
- Genus: Baloskion
- Species: B. longipes

Binomial name
- Baloskion longipes (R.Br.) L.A.S.Johnson & B.G.Briggs

Synonyms
- Restio longipes L.A.S.Johnson & O.D.Evans

Species of flowering plant

Baloskion longipes, common name dense cordrush, is a dioecious perennial herb in the Restionaceae family, found in southeastern New South Wales.

It has cauline sheaths which usually have a few very short hairs on the margins. The culms are erect and about 90–150 cm high and 2–2.5 mm in diameter.

The spikelets on the lower part of the flower head are not crowded, but borne on fine branches, which may be several centimetres long. The flowering glumes are 4–6 mm long. The male spikelets are ovate and 4–8 mm long, with six tepals, three stamens and a minute pistillode. The female spikelets are ovate to elliptic and 8.5–9.3 mm long, with four tepals and two staminodes.

It is found on alluvium in swamps and depressions.

It was first described as Restio longipes in 1963 by Lawrie Johnson and Obed David Evans and reassigned to the genus Baloskion in 1998 by Lawrie Johnson and Barbara Briggs.

The specific epithet, longipes, derives from the Latin words longus meaning "long" and pes meaning "foot" or "stalk", giving an adjective which describes the plant as having a long stalk.

It is listed as "vulnerable" under the EPBC Act.
