= Coastal Upland Swamps =

Ecoregion in New South Wales, Australia

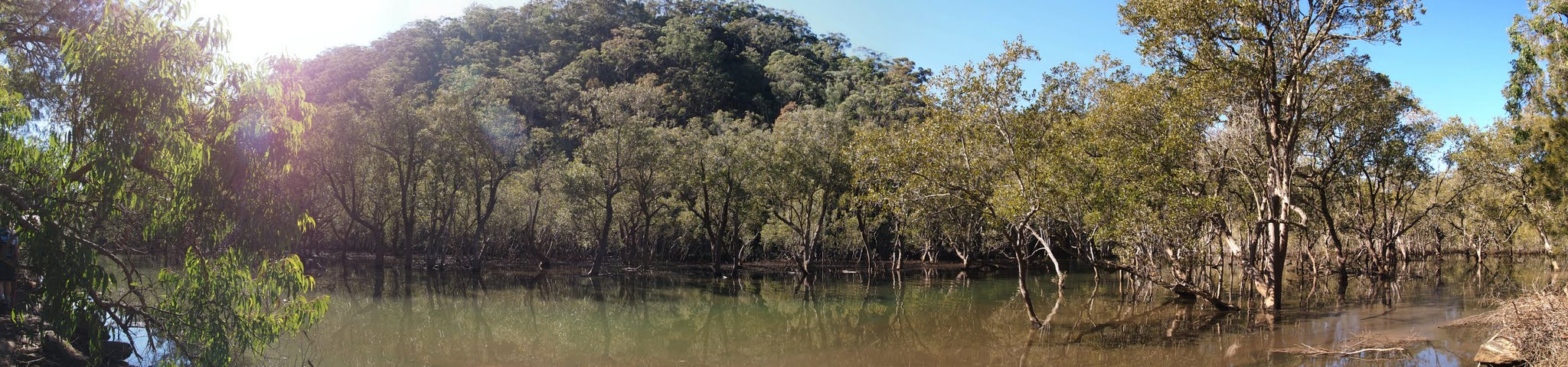
- Peats Bight in Cowan

Ecology
- Realm: Australasia
- Biome: Flooded grasslands and savannas
- Borders: Cumberland Plain Woodland; Sydney Turpentine-Ironbark Forest

Geography
- Country: Australia
- Elevation: 20–600 metres (66–1,969 ft)
- Coordinates: 34°02′02″S 151°01′34″E
- Climate type: Humid subtropical climate (Cfa)
- Soil types: Sandy loam, peat

The Coastal Upland Swamps are critically endangered swamp areas scattered in the Sydney area and the Illawarra Escarpment which feature flora and fauna associated with sporadically marshy soils on the Hawkesbury sandstone plateaus. It occurs in the eastern Sydney area from the Somersby district in the north to Robertson in the south.

== Geography ==
In the south, the community is present on the Woronora Plateau with shallow groundwater aquifers and in the north it is found on the Somersby-Hornsby Plateaus, where it occurs on impervious sandstone plateaus and acidic soils in the headwater valleys of watercourses, and on sandstone plateaus with plentiful flowing moisture and are related to weathered shale lenses and ironstone. They occur in damp areas, such as in the Illawarra escarpment, as the slope creates orographic rainfall, fog and increased cloud cover, which successively decreases evaporation.

The southern part of its spacing is detached from the north by an area of non-sandstone substrates, lower rainfall and lower elevation, and by the urban development of Sydney. They are found in elevations from 20 metres (66 ft) to approximately 600 metres (2,000 ft) above sea level, although the majority of them occur between 200 and 450 metres (660 and 1,480 ft). The largest swamp is just above 14 hectares (35 acres) while 42% of the mapped swamps are less than one hectare (2.5 acres).

== Ecology ==
Vegetation variety include open graminoid heath, sedge, closed scrubs, closed heaths, ferns, and tall scrub, in addition to microorganisms, fungi, and cryptogamic plants.

=== Animals ===
The Australian crayfish, hairy crayfish and Sydney crayfish are plenteous in the community, and as well as the Green and golden bell frog, Red-crowned toadlet, giant dragonfly and the giant burrowing frog. Other tetrapods include Wallabia bicolor, Varanus rosenbergi, Antechinus stuartii and Rattus lutreolus. Birds include Phylidonyris novaehollandiae, Stipiturus malachurus, Stagonopleura bella and Pezoporus wallicus.

== See also ==
- Sydney Freshwater Wetlands, lowland freshwater swamps and marshes
