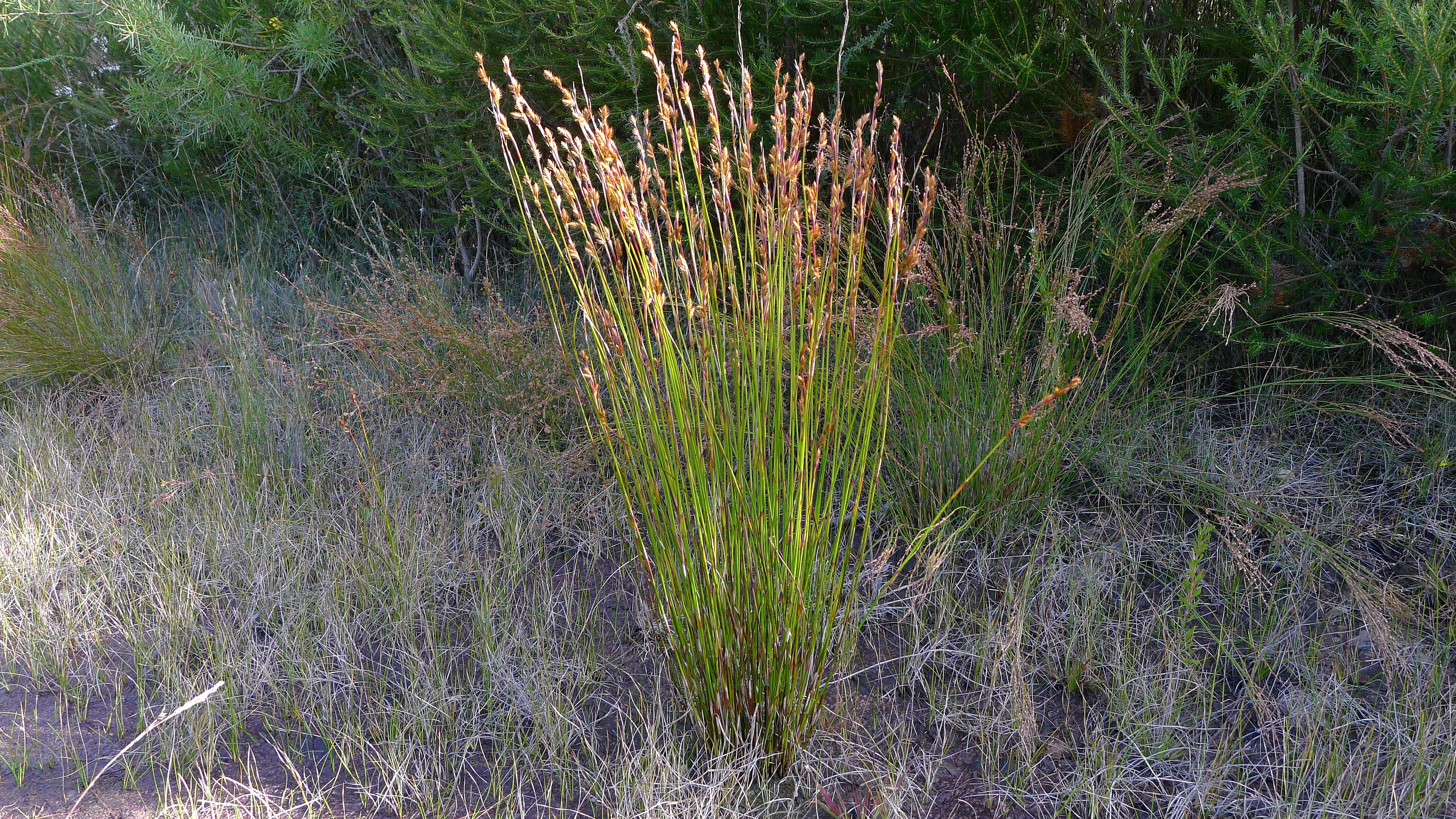
- Royal National Park

Scientific classification
- Kingdom: Plantae
- Clade: Tracheophytes
- Clade: Angiosperms
- Clade: Monocots
- Clade: Commelinids
- Order: Poales
- Family: Restionaceae
- Genus: Baloskion
- Species: B. gracile

Binomial name
- Baloskion gracile (R.Br.) L.A.S.Johnson & B.G.Briggs

Synonyms
- Restio australis R.Br.

= Baloskion gracile =

Perennial herb found near Sydney in Australia

Baloskion gracile is a species of perennial herb found near Sydney in Australia. A rush with stems from 30 to 100 cm tall. The preferred habitat is wet, sandy soil. This is one of the many plants first published by Robert Brown with the type known as "(J. D.) v.v." appearing in his Prodromus Florae Novae Hollandiae et Insulae Van Diemen in 1810. The specific epithet gracile meaning slender, refers to the thin stems.
