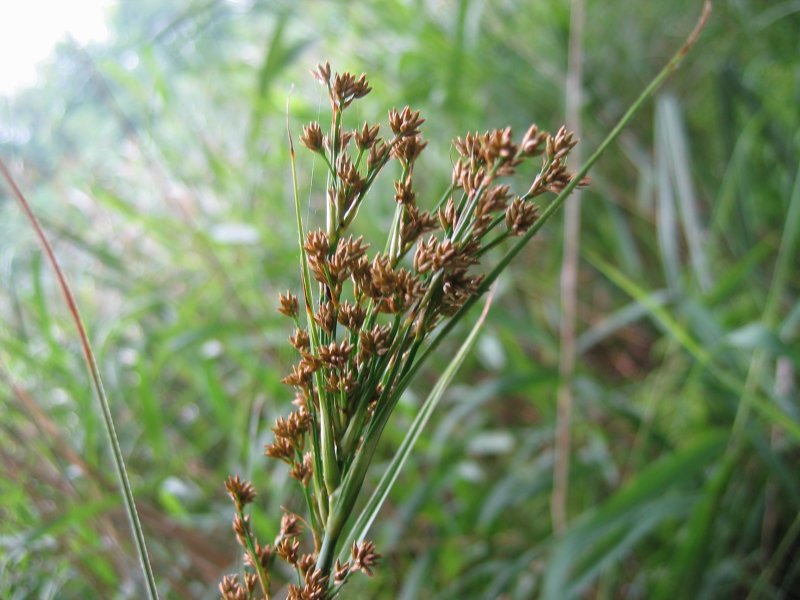
- Cladium mariscus

Scientific classification
- Kingdom: Plantae
- Clade: Embryophytes
- Clade: Tracheophytes
- Clade: Spermatophytes
- Clade: Angiosperms
- Clade: Monocots
- Clade: Commelinids
- Order: Poales
- Family: Cyperaceae
- Genus: Cladium; P.Browne

Synonyms
- Mariscus Scop.; Trasis P.Beauv. in T.G.Lestiboudois

= Cladium =

Genus of grass-like plants

Cladium (fen-sedge, sawgrass or twig-sedge) is a genus of large sedges, with a nearly worldwide distribution in tropical and temperate regions. These are plants characterized by long, narrow (grass-like) leaves having sharp, often serrated (sawtooth-like) margins, and flowering stems 1–3 m tall bearing a much-branched inflorescence. Like many plants found in wet habitats, it has deeply buried rhizomes that can produce tall shoots with dense canopies.

Cladium mariscus subsp. jamaicense, or saw-grass, is common in marshes and savannas throughout the tropical Americas. One typical and well-known area of extensive saw-grass growth is the Florida Everglades; sawgrass is the plant referred to by the descriptor, "River of Grass". Like many species of the Everglades, C. jamaicense grows in extremely infertile conditions, particularly wet sites that are low in phosphorus. Dense sawgrass beds are intermingled with other vegetation types. Together they produce a rich array of habitats that support the biological diversity of the Everglades. American alligators also use sawgrass to build nests. Phosphorus from agricultural runoff favoured dense cattail over rich sawgrass habitats, choking off water access for animals and birds. Eighty plant and animal species in the Everglades are threatened or endangered.

Cladium mariscoides, or twig-rush, is also a wetland plant, but is found further north, and in other kinds of wetlands including fens, wet meadows and pond shores. Owing to such specific habitat requirements, it is quite rare in the northern states such as Minnesota. "Finding a self-sustaining population of C. mariscoides on a lake shore is indeed a very rare event in Minnesota".

Cladium mariscus is frequently encountered in English fens. Its ability to form dense stands can lead to reduced plant diversity. Hence, it is sometimes mowed to reduce dominance.

Sawgrass may be useful as a source for developing biofuel (ethanol), possibly replacing corn as the cellulose (the basis for developing ethanol) source of choice. On Gotland, a limestone island in the Baltic Sea, Cladium mariscus is used for thatching.

== Fossil record ==
Several fossil endocarps of †Cladium bicorne and †Cladium reidiorum have been described from middle Miocene strata of the Fasterholt area near Silkeborg in Central Jutland, Denmark.

== Species ==
The number of species contained in the genus is disputed, with different authors accepting between two and 60 species as distinct. At present, three species are accepted by Kew Royal Botanic Gardens, one having four subspecies.

- Cladium costatum Steyerm. – known only from Venezuela and Guyana
- Cladium mariscoides (Muhl.) Torr. – smooth sawgrass (eastern North America from Labrador to Manitoba, south to Florida and Texas)
- Cladium mariscus (L.) Pohl – great fen-sedge, saw-sedge
  - Cladium mariscus subsp. californicum (S.Watson) Govaerts – California, Arizona, New Mexico, Nevada, Utah, Texas, Sonora, Coahuila
  - Cladium mariscus subsp. intermedium Kük. – Australia, New Caledonia
  - Cladium mariscus subsp. jamaicense (Crantz) Kük. – Latin America from Mexico to Argentina; West Indies; southeastern United States from Texas to Delaware; naturalized in tropical Africa and on many oceanic islands including Canary Islands, Madagascar, New Guinea, Hawaii
  - Cladium mariscus subsp. mariscus – Europe, northern Asia and North Africa from Ireland and Morocco to Japan, including Germany, Italy, France, Scandinavia, Poland, Balkans, Ukraine, Russia, Siberia, Saudi Arabia, Iran, Himalayas, Kazakhstan, China, Korea
