= Coastal swamp oak forest =

Riparian forests in Australia

Coastal swamp oak forest of south-east Queensland and New South Wales
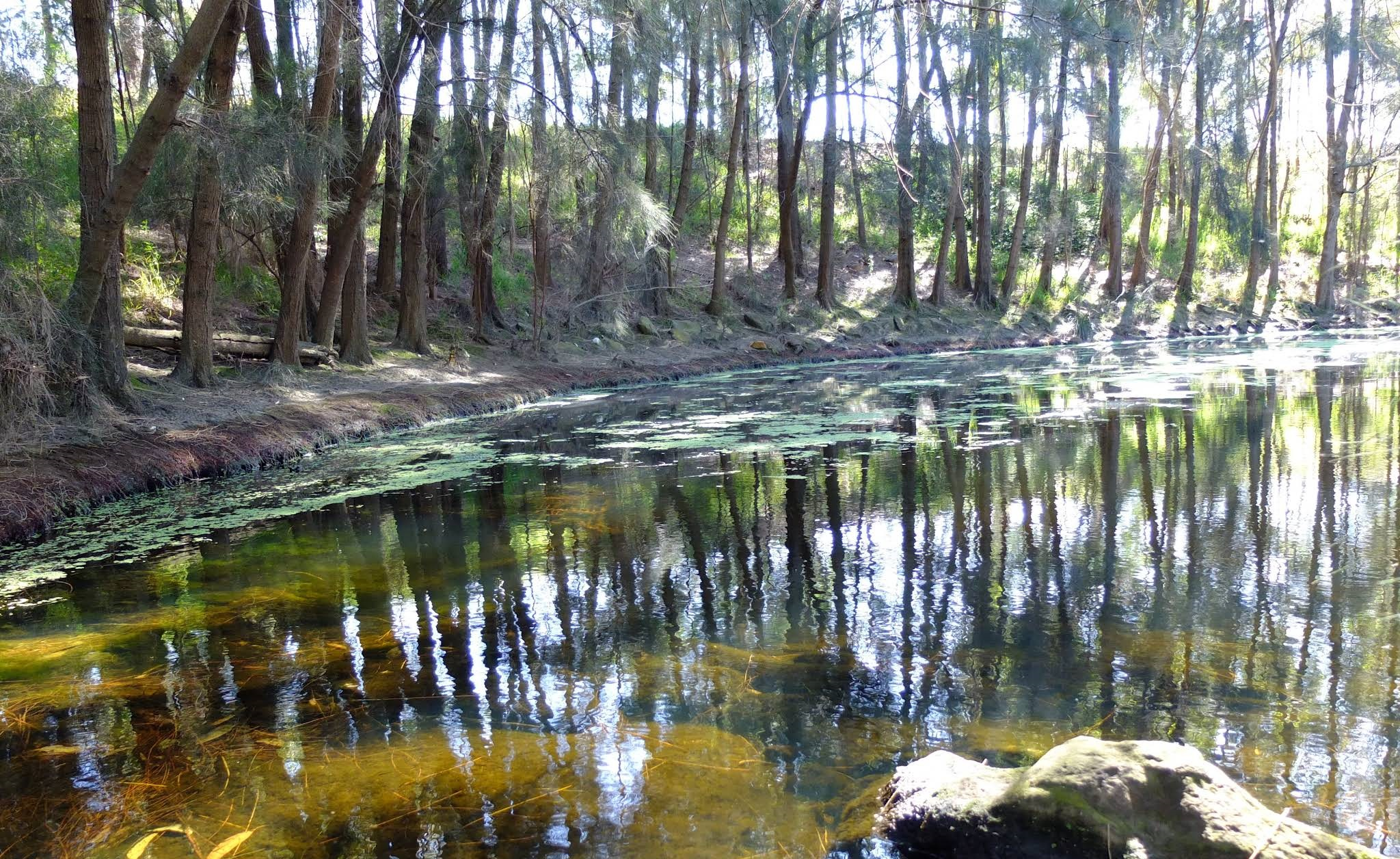
- Swamp oak forest at Orphan School Creek, St Johns Park, New South Wales

Ecology
- Realm: Australasia
- Biome: Riparian forests

Geography
- Country: Australia
- Elevation: 20–50 m (66–164 ft)
- Climate type: Humid subtropical climate (Cfa); Oceanic climate (Cfb)
- Soil types: Alluvium, clay loam, sandy loam, peat

Coastal swamp oak forest, also known as swamp oak floodplain forests and estuarine swamp oak forests, are scattered riparian forests found in southeastern Queensland to southeastern New South Wales, Australia that would predominantly feature Casuarina glauca (swamp oaks). They occur within the South Eastern Queensland, NSW North Coast, Sydney Basin, or South East Corner bioregions.

Both this ecological zone and the river-flat eucalypt forest community used to fall under the Sydney Coastal River Flat Forest biome, before they were separated as two distinct ecological areas in 2019 (since the latter predominantly features eucalyptus trees, whereas this zone is more Casuarina-dominant).

== Geography ==
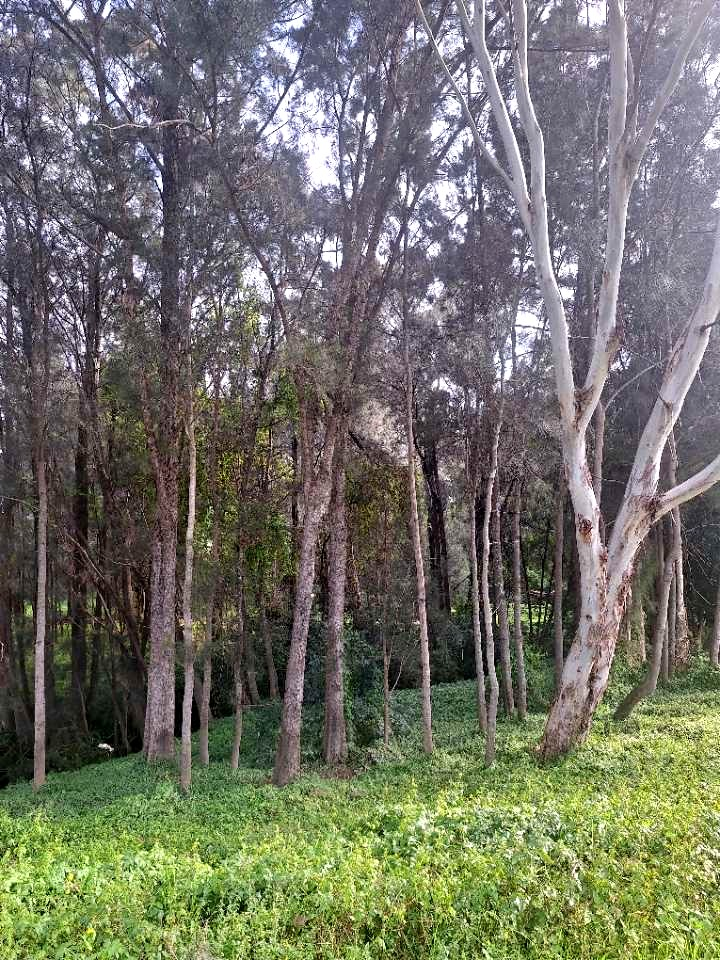
The ecozone at Smithfield, near Prospect Creek

Only about 26% of their original extent remaining, coastal swamp oak forests generally occur on light or alluvial soil on coastal flats, floodplains, drainage lines, lake margins, wetlands and estuarine fringes where soils are at least at times saturated, marshy or overflowed. Some may occur on coastal dune swales or flats.

Having a dense to sparse tree layer, the community is mostly found as disjointed residue patches along the coast between Curtis Island (south-east Queensland), north of Gladstone, and Bermagui (southern New South Wales), up to 50 m (160 ft) above sea level (ASL) but usually less than 20 m (66 ft) ASL and they are usually within 30 km (19 mi) of the coast, but in several areas, such as along tidal river catchments, the community can be present more than 100 km (62 mi) inland.

=== Extent ===
Major presence include: around 350 ha (860 acres) on the Tweed lowlands; to a lesser degree than 650 ha (1,600 acres) on the lower Clarence floodplain; less than 400 ha (990 acres) on the lower Macleay floodplain; less than 3,200 ha (7,900 acres) in the Hunter Valley; less than 5,200 ha (13,000 acres) in the Sydney and South Coast region; and less than 1,000 ha (2,500 acres) in the Eden region. The community's composition may alter from open forests to low woodlands, scrubs or reed lands with scattered trees.

== Ecology ==
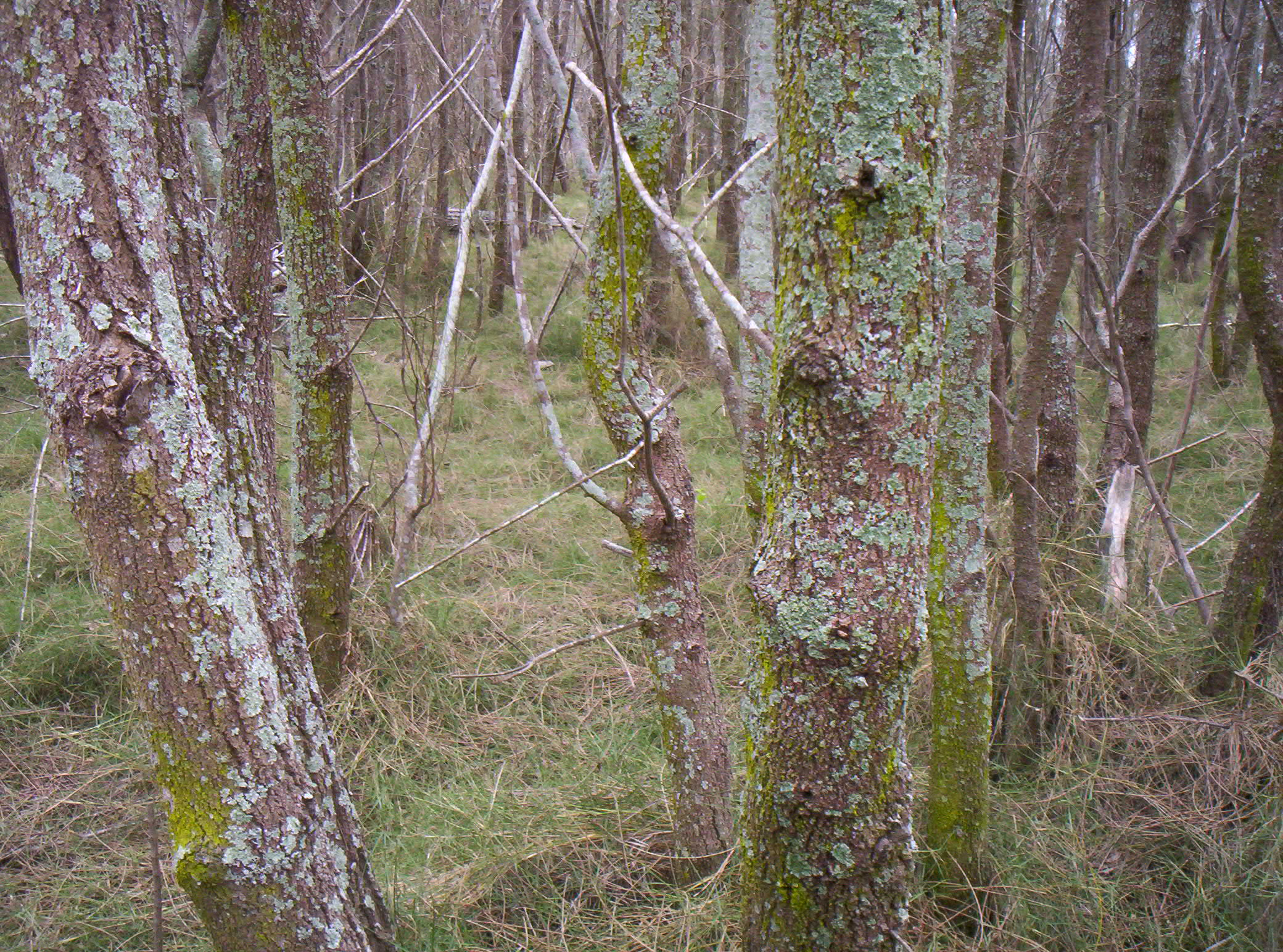
Lichen and algae on Casuarina glauca trunks in Boondall Wetlands, southeastern Queensland

Although swamp oaks are the principal trees that occur in the canopy, there also exist many other species such as Acmena smithii, Alphitonia excelsa, Melaleuca salicina, Cupaniopsis anacardioides, Glochidion ferdinandi, Parsonsia straminea and at times Melaleuca spp., where they shape a sub-canopy layer.

The saline understorey consists of Baumea juncea, Alexfloydia repens, Baumea juncea, Juncus kraussii, Phragmites australis, Selliera radicans, Cynodon dactylon, Phragmites australis, Parsonsia straminea, Geitonoplesium cymosum, Stephania japonica and Suaeda australis, with freshwater species being Blechnum indicum, Carex appressa, Gahnia clarkei, Centella asiatica, Oplismenus imbecillis, Commelina cyanea, Hypolepis muelleri, Persicaria decipiens, Lomandra longifolia, Microlaena stipoides and Viola banksii. The total canopy cover is least 10%.

== Biodiversity ==
The animals that occupy the community also dwell in conterminous wetlands, grasslands, woodlands and forests. The animals include bats, possums, bandicoots, birds, frogs, turtles and other reptiles. Mammals include Cercartetus nanus, Myotis macropus, Phascogale tapoatafa, Pteropus poliocephalus, Syconycteris australis, Phascolarctos cinereus, Antechinus stuartii, Perameles nasuta, Potorous tridactylus, Pseudomys novaehollandiae and Rattus lutreolus.

Reptiles present are Cyclodomorphus michaeli, Egernia mcpheei, Boiga irregularis, Hemiaspis signata, Hoplocephalus bitorquatus, Pseudechis porphyriacus, Tropidechis carinatus, Chelodina longicollis, Emydura macquarii, Elseya albagula, Elusor macrurus and Wollumbinia georgesi.

== Plant communities ==
Various state vegetation mapping units contain the Coastal Swamp Oak Forest, and patches of it are likely to correspond with the Plant Community Types (PCT) listed in the table below:

Common name	NRM Regions
Swamp oak swamp forest of the coastal lowlands NSW North Coast Bioregion	Northern Rivers
Swamp Oak forested wetland of saline areas of coastal estuaries	North Coast
Milky mangrove woodland of tidal estuaries	North Coast
Swamp oak – broad-leaved paperbark, willow bottlebrush floodplain forested wetland	North Coast
Broad-leaved paperbark, swamp oak, tall sedge swamp forest on alluvial soils	North Coast
Swamp oak open forest on riverflats of the Cumberland Plain and Hunter Valley	Sydney Metro/Hawkesbury-Nepean
Swamp-oak, sea rush swamp forest	Hunter Valley and Central Rivers
Swamp oak-prickly paperbark tall sedge forest Central Coast and Lower North Coast	Hunter/Central Rivers
Coastal freshwater swamp forest	Sydney Metro
Swamp oak swamp forest fringing estuaries of the Sydney Basin and South East Corner Bioregion	Hunter/Central Rivers; Hawksbury Nepean; Sydney Metro; Southern Rivers
Swamp paperbark-swamp oak	Sydney Metro and Southern Rivers
Coastal freshwater lagoons of the Sydney Basin Bioregion and South East Corner Bioregion	Sydney Metro and Southern Rivers

== See also ==
- River-flat eucalypt forest
