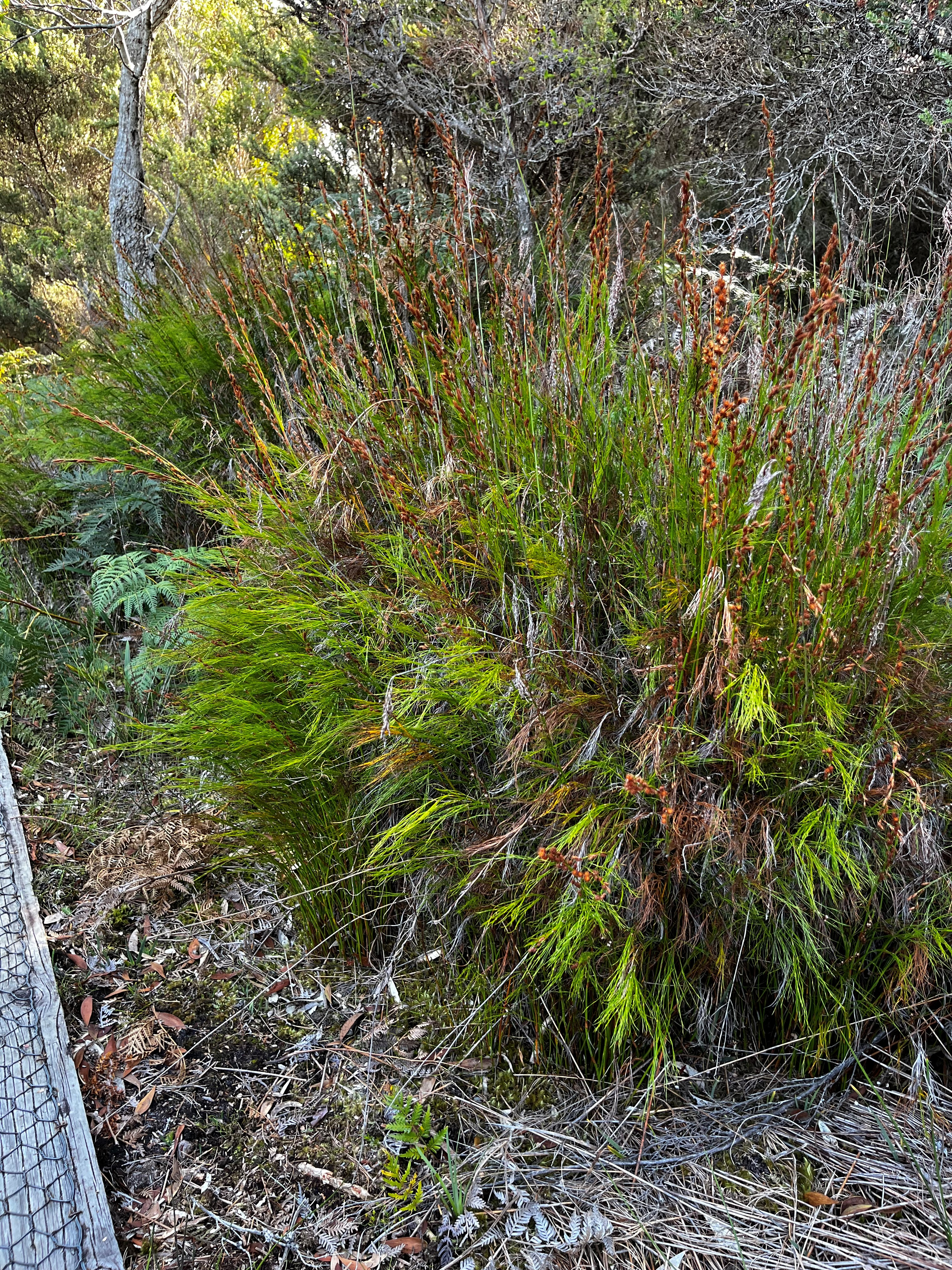

Scientific classification
- Kingdom: Plantae
- Clade: Tracheophytes
- Clade: Angiosperms
- Clade: Monocots
- Clade: Commelinids
- Order: Poales
- Family: Restionaceae
- Genus: Baloskion
- Species: B. tetraphyllum

Binomial name
- Baloskion tetraphyllum (Labill.) B.G.Briggs & L.A.S.Johnson

Synonyms
- Restio tetraphyllus Labill. Baloskion dichotomum Raf. nom. illeg.

= Baloskion tetraphyllum =

Species of flowering plant

Baloskion tetraphyllum, commonly known as tassel rope-rush, is a species of grass native to Australia. It is a large and somewhat common species of restionaceae which can be easily identified by its bright green colour and its tasseled branches with soft, hairlike texture.

== Description ==
Baloskion tetraphyllum is an understory species which grows between 0.5-2m tall. It is a semi-erect perennial herb with rigid emergent stems (or culms) which, through repeated branching, reduces in internal rigidity causing the plant to droop along the end of its stem. These stems are hollow towards the base and have an initial diameter of 3-5mm before they branch.

B. tetraphyllum appears in clusters which are typically greater than 1m wide; these vary from being very tightly packed, to occurring in more spread-out bunches. B. tetraphyllum has smooth, beautifully bright green culms which repeatedly branch into whorls out of tan coloured sheaths.

The reproductive structure of this plant occurs as a bunch of narrow spikelets at the end of the branches, these are its flowers which are tan colour and can be found from 15-450 times per branch.

There are two plants which can look very similar to B. tetraphyllum, and telling the difference between these and B. tetraphyllum can be very easy if you know what to look for. Baloskion australe is very closely related, however its completely erect stems do not branch into feathery tassels like the B. tetraphyllum and it is much smaller, only reaching 0.35-1m tall. Even more closely related is the subspecies of B. tetraphyllum, Meiostachyum, which is smaller and found in warmer climates, typically between south-east Queensland and north-east New South Wales, and it has a greater number of spikelets, between 200 and 450.

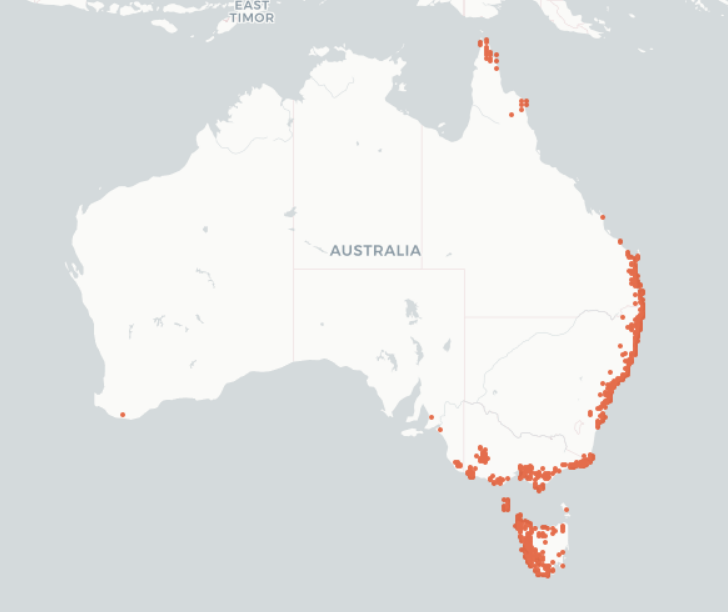
Range map of Baloskion tetraphyllum from Atlas of Living Australia

== Habitat & Distribution ==
B. tetraphyllum can be found growing in swampy places, such as stream banks and wetlands. It grows well in disturbed areas, often seen growing at the edge of carparks and beside walking trails. B. tetraphyllum will grow well in both sand and peat soils.

B. tetraphyllum has a very widespread range and can be found continually along the east of Australia from Queensland to Tasmania. In Tasmania the range of this plant is typically restrained to the western side of Tyler’s Line.

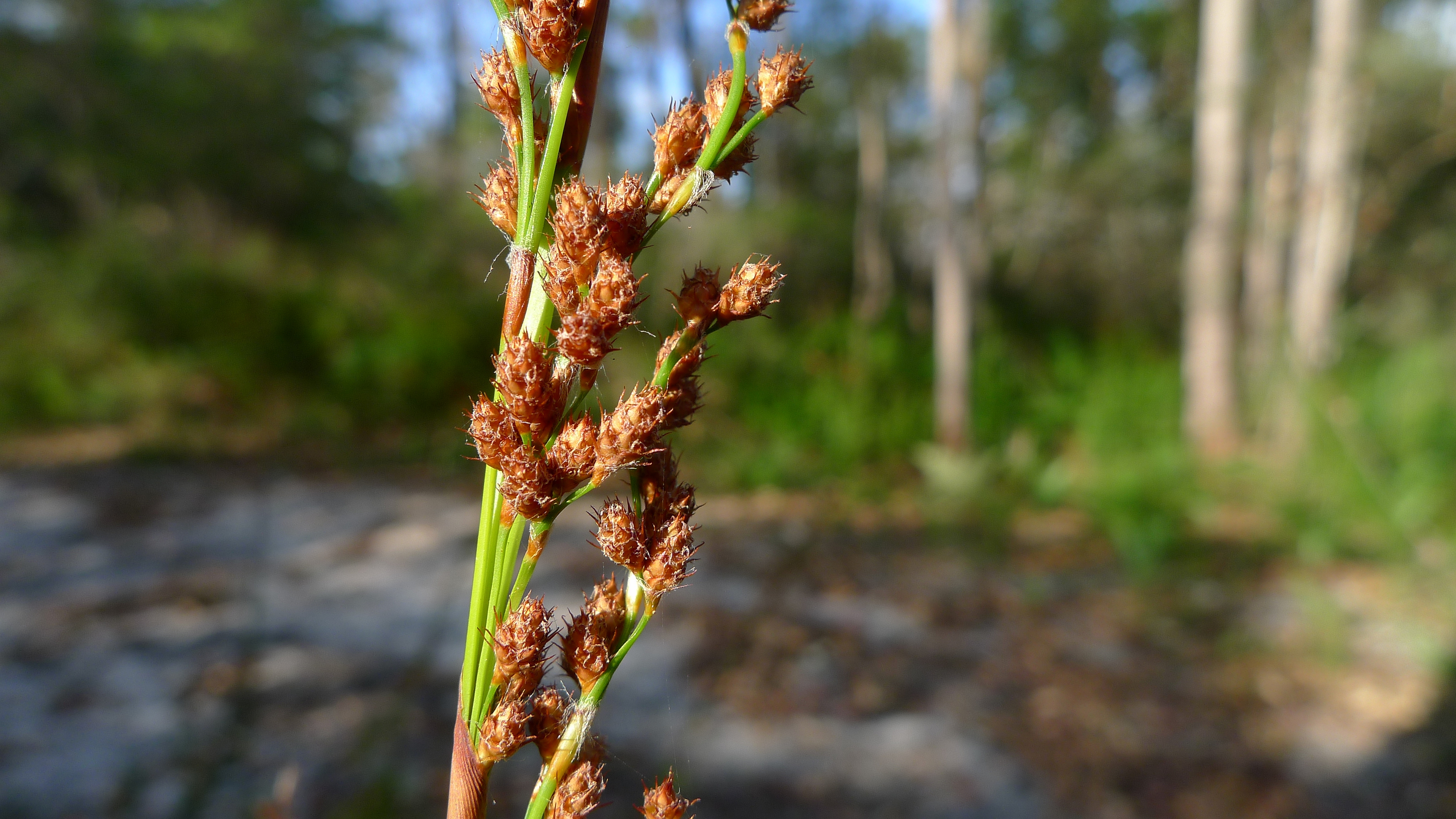
Reproductive structure of Baloskion tetraphyllum showing spikelet arrangement

== Ecology ==
B. tetraphyllum uses wind dispersal to reproduce, the seeds detach with the flower which act as wings to help the seed put distance between itself and the parent plant. B. tetraphyllum is an obligate seeder and typically needs fire to germinate, meaning reproduction has far better luck when a fire passes through an area. B. tetraphyllum is not able to resprout following a fire and completely relies on its seeds to regenerate, this becomes an issue if there is a short interval between fires and the seedbank cannot be replenished between instances of fire.

== Uses ==
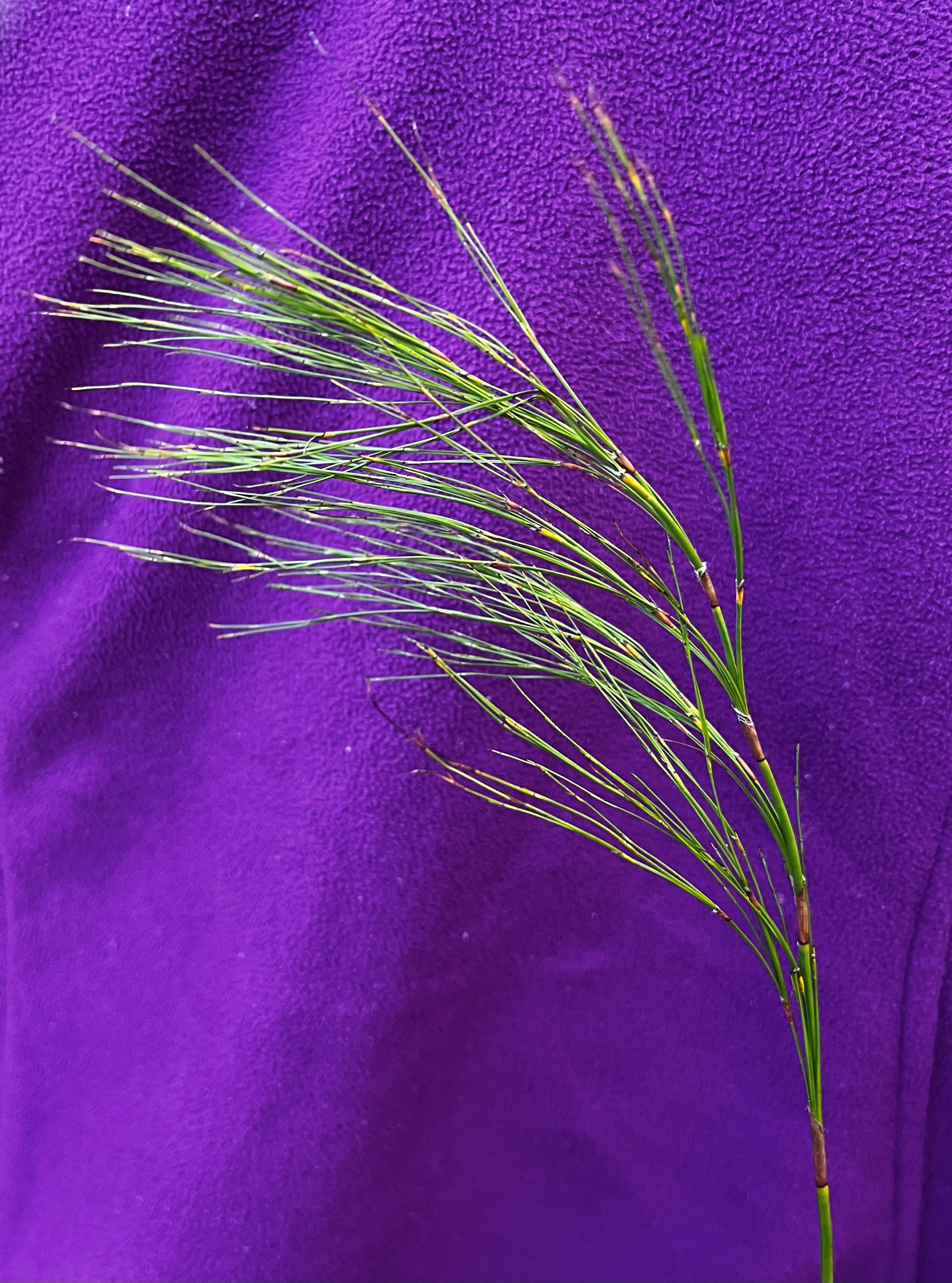
Single stem of Baloskion tetraphyllum

B. tetraphyllum is a beautiful grass which is often used as a decorative garden species and sold for its cut flowers; it is also a plant which has been used for wetland and mine site rehabilitation. B. tetraphyllum’s close relationship with fire, as well as its fussy nature during propagation, has led to research into increasing propagation success through a variety of methods, this has yielded results which make the production of the species a lot easier.

== Taxonomy & Naming ==
B. tetraphyllum was initially described by Jacques Labillardière in 1806 in his series Novae Hollandiae Plantarum Specimen where it was placed in the genus Restio, it was known as Restio tetraphyllum until 1998 when it was moved into the Baloskion genus.

As it has such a wide range across Australia B. tetraphyllum has been blessed quite a few common names, these include: Australian reed, Dingo fern, Feather-plant, Feathertop, Hair-plant, Koala fern and Plume rush.
