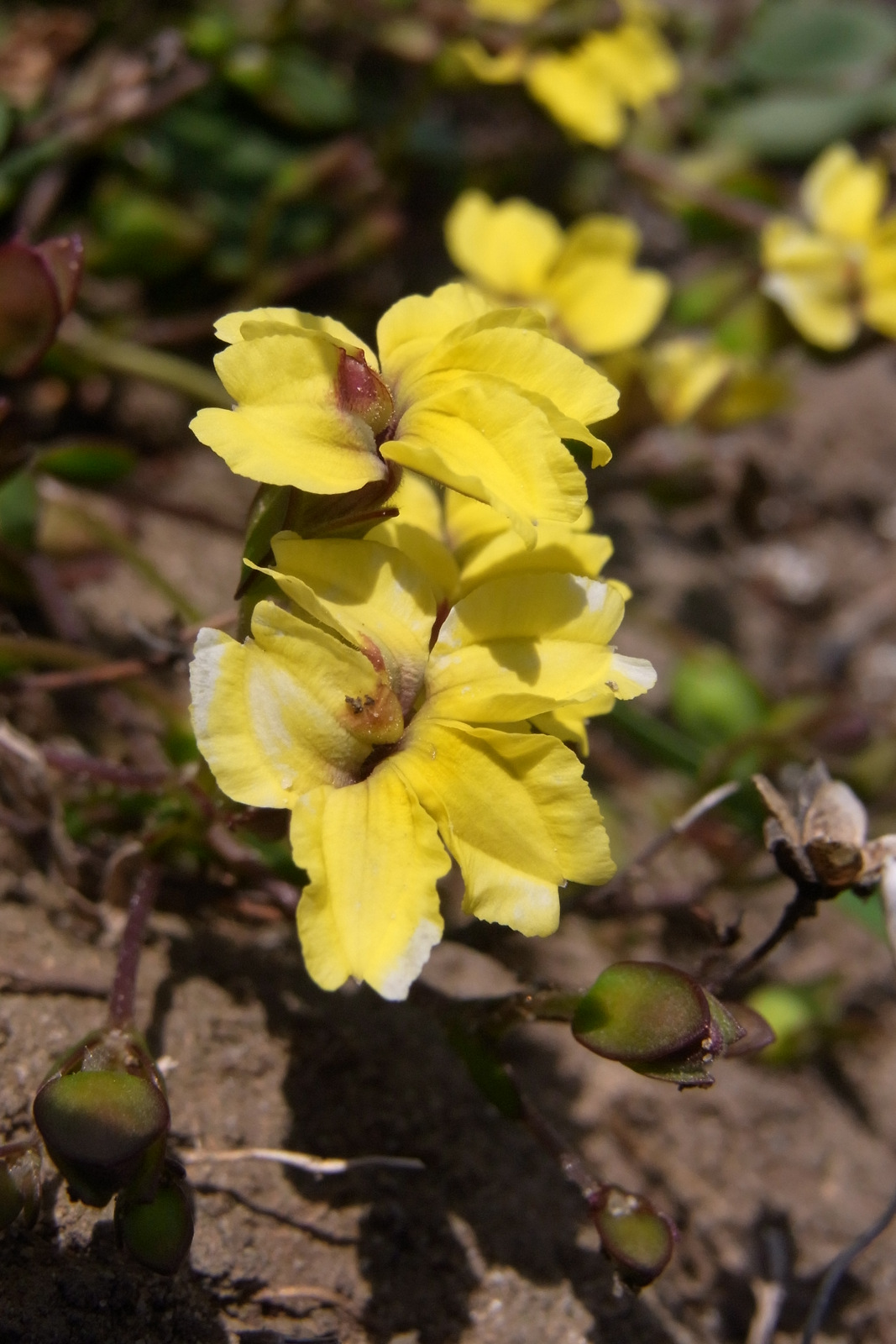
- Cape Byron, Australia

Scientific classification
- Kingdom: Plantae
- Clade: Tracheophytes
- Clade: Angiosperms
- Clade: Eudicots
- Clade: Asterids
- Order: Asterales
- Family: Goodeniaceae
- Genus: Goodenia
- Species: G. paniculata

Binomial name
- Goodenia paniculata Sm.

Synonyms
- Boutonia pomifera Steud. nom. inval.; Goodenia lanceolata Steud. nom. inval.; Goodenia flexuosa de Vriese

= Goodenia paniculata =

Branched goodenia

Species of flowering plant

Goodenia paniculata, commonly known as branched goodenia, is a species of plant in the family Goodeniaceae and is endemic to eastern Australia. It is a short-lived herb with egg-shaped to lance-shaped leaves with toothed edges and racemes of yellow flowers.

== Description ==
Goodenia paniculata is a short-lived herb that typically grows to a height of 50 cm (20 in) with many adventitious roots. The leaves are mostly at the base of the plant, egg-shaped to lance-shaped with the narrower end towards the base, 14–100 mm (0.55–3.94 in) long and 6–10 mm (0.24–0.39 in) wide, with toothed edges. The flowers are arranged in racemes or thyrses up to 250 mm (9.8 in) long on a peduncle 7–80 mm (0.28–3.15 in) long with linear to narrow elliptic bracts 4–40 mm (0.16–1.57 in) long and bracteoles 1.5–2 mm (0.059–0.079 in) long. Each flower is on a pedicel 6–16 mm (0.24–0.63 in) long with triangular to lance-shaped sepals 1–2 mm (0.039–0.079 in) long. The corolla is 10–14 mm (0.39–0.55 in) long, the lower lobes 5–6 mm (0.20–0.24 in) long with wings about 1.5 mm (0.059 in) wide. Flowering mainly occurs from October to April and the fruit is a spherical to oval capsule 5–6 mm (0.20–0.24 in) long.

== Taxonomy ==
The name Goodenia paniculata first appeared in scientific literature in the Transactions of the Linnean Society of London in 1794, published by the English botanist, James Edward Smith from specimens collected by David Burton in Port Jackson.

Karel Domin described Goodenia rosulata from Queensland in 1929, but this name is now regarded as a synonym of G. paniculata by the Australian Plant Census.

The specific epithet paniculata refers to flower panicles. However, the flowers form on racemes not panicles.

== Distribution and habitat ==
Branched goodenia grows in freshwater wetland or swampy habitat on clay, silty or sandy soils, often on the coast, and it has been known to grow in soils with pH as low as 2.5. It is found from Queensland through eastern New South Wales to south-eastern Victoria to as far west as Rosedale. In New South Wales in mainly occurs in coastal areas but also as far west as the Blue Mountains and Nerriga. The plant community it grows in is heath or woodland, dominated by such trees as thin-leaved stringybark (Eucalyptus eugenioides), broad-leaved red ironbark (E. fibrosa), forest red gum (E. tereticornis), woollybutt (E. longifolia) and white feather honeymyrtle (Melaleuca decora), and shrubs such as prickly-leaved paperbark (M. nodosa), Deane's paperbark (M. deanei), and tantoon (Leptospermum polygalifolium).
