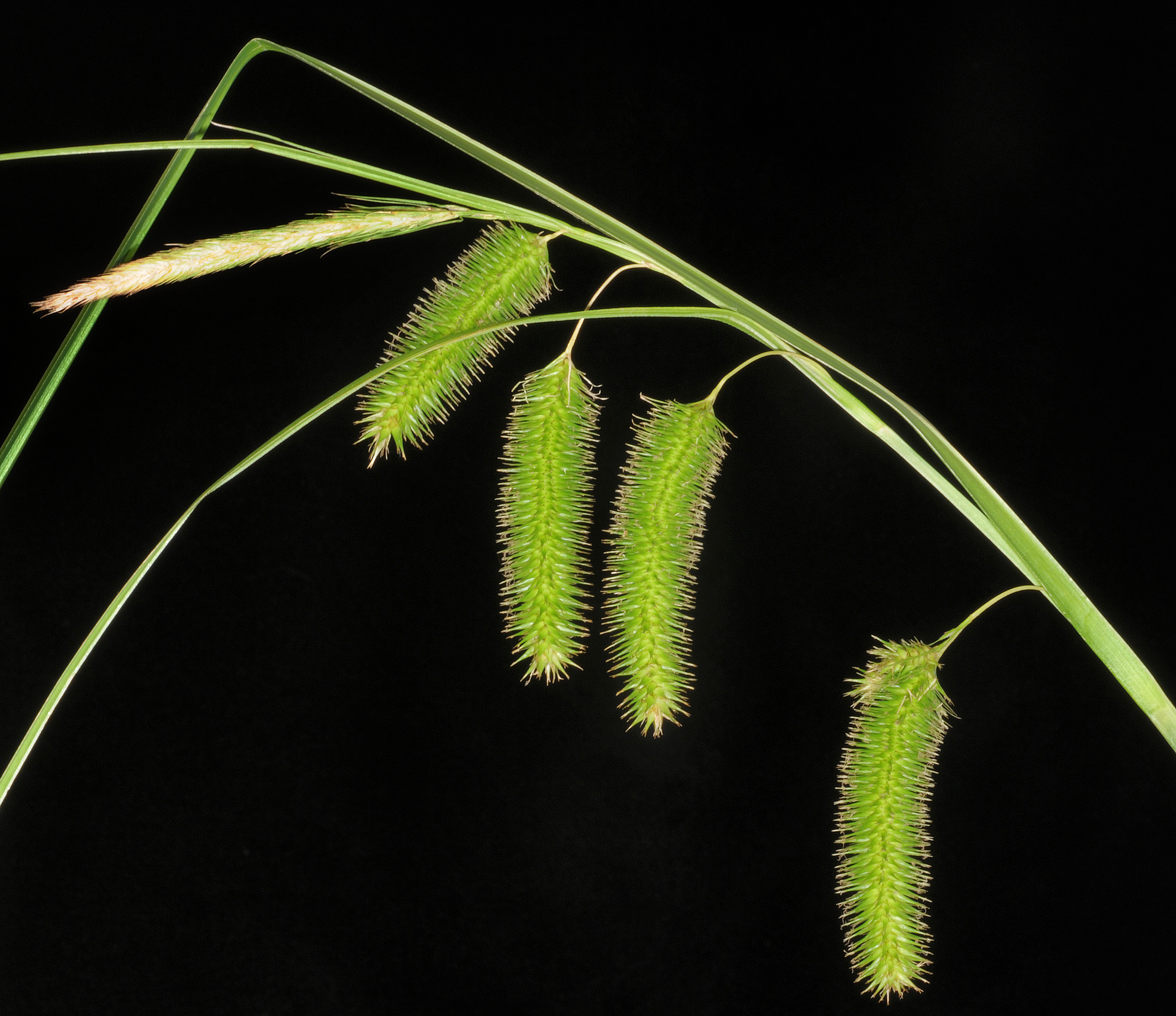

Scientific classification
- Kingdom: Plantae
- Clade: Tracheophytes
- Clade: Angiosperms
- Clade: Monocots
- Clade: Commelinids
- Order: Poales
- Family: Cyperaceae
- Genus: Carex
- Species: C. fascicularis

Binomial name
- Carex fascicularis Boott, 1853

= Carex fascicularis =

Tassel sedge

Species of grass-like plant

Carex fascicularis, commonly known as tassel sedge, is a species of sedge of the family Cyperaceae that is native to Australia, New Zealand and New Guinea.

== Description ==
The monoecious and rhizomatous perennial grass-like sedge has a tufted habit and typically grows to a height of 0.6 to 1.5 metres (2 to 5 ft). and a width of 0.5 to 0.75 m (1 ft 8 in to 2 ft 6 in). The leaves are bright green with a length up to 1 m (3 ft 3 in) with a width of 6 to 11 mm (0.24 to 0.43 in) and are swollen at the inner partitions and has yellow-brown coloured sheaths. The sedge is densely tufted and is able to spread using short underground stems. It has erect flowering stems that have a triangular cross-section are rough toward the top and have a height of about 1 m (3 ft 3 in). It blooms between Spring to early Summer from September to November in Western Australia producing green flowers. In Victoria it flowers from November to April.

== Taxonomy ==
The species was described by Francis Boott in 1853 as a part of Joseph Dalton Hooker's work Flora Novae-Zelandiae. It has three synonyms; Carex fascicularis var. minor, Carex novae-selandiae and Carex pseudocyperus var. fascicularis.

== Distribution ==
In Western Australia is found in swamps and along creek and rivers throughout a large area of the Peel, South West and Great Southern regions where it grows in black peaty-sandy soils. It is commonly found elsewhere in an aquatic to semi-aquatic environment growing in damp to wet soils in part or dappled shade. In South Australia it is found south of Adelaide, South Australia extended eastwards into southern Victoria and then north into New South Wales and Queensland where it is found in coastal areas.

== See also ==
- List of Carex species
