= River-flat eucalypt forest =

Ecological community in Australia

River-flat eucalypt forest on coastal floodplains
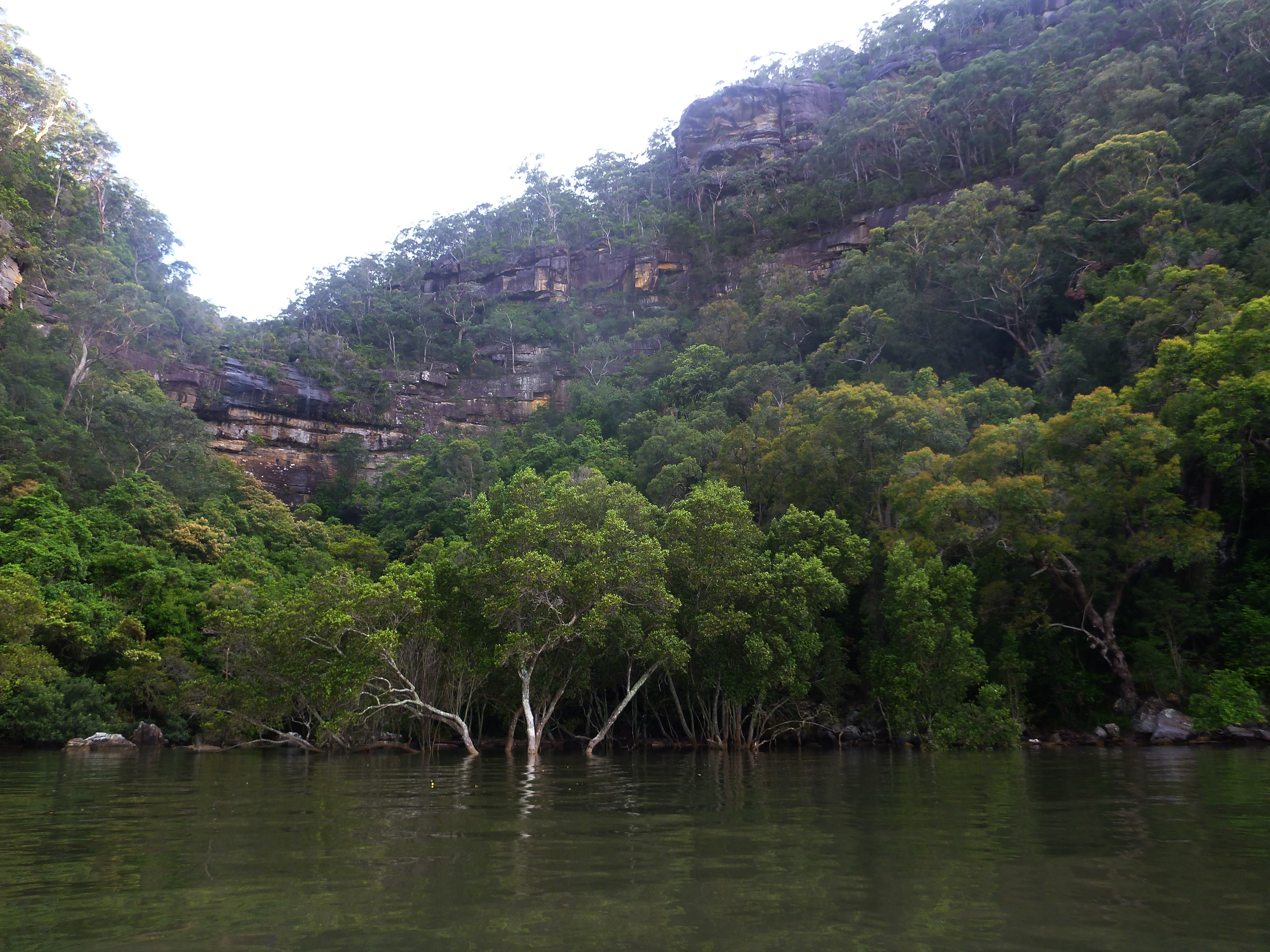
- A river-flat eucalyptus forest towards Hawkesbury River

Ecology
- Realm: Australasia
- Biome: Riparian forests

Geography
- Country: Australia
- Elevation: 50–100 metres (160–330 ft)
- Climate type: Humid subtropical climate (Cfa); Oceanic climate (Cfb)
- Soil types: Alluvium, clay loam, sandy loam, silt

The River-flat eucalypt forest or Coastal floodplain eucalypt forest is a critically endangered threatened ecological community that is primarily found in southeastern Australia, from southeastern Queensland, through New South Wales, to eastern Victoria, on alluvial soils of the coastal floodplains.

== Nomenclature ==
The name chiefly refers to its riparian and floodplain landscape location and the predominant tree canopy being Eucalyptus, Angophora and/or Corymbia, which may exceed 40 m in height.

Both the River-flat eucalypt forest and Coastal Swamp Oak Forest communities used to fall under the Sydney Coastal River Flat Forest biome, before they were separated as two distinct ecological zones in 2019. This is because the former community has more widespread eucalyptus vegetation, whereas the latter is Casuarina-dominant.

== Geography ==
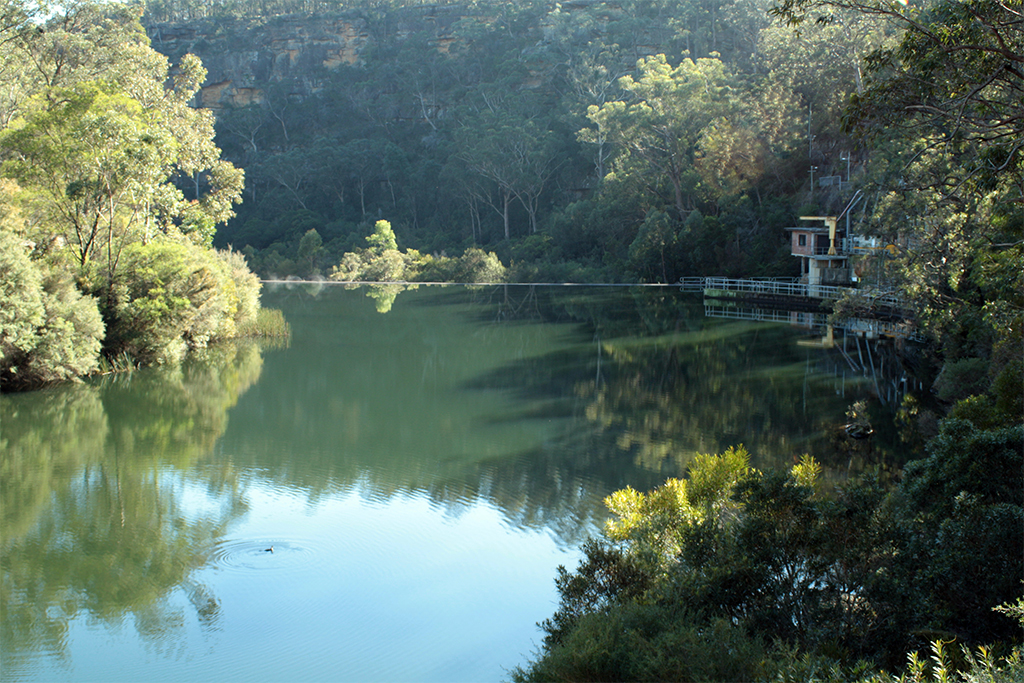
River-flat forest on Cataract River, near Appin

Less than 30% of its original range remaining, the community is found within the following bioregions: South East Corner (SEC), Sydney Basin (SYB), NSW North Coast (NNC), and South East Queensland (SEQ). It may also occur in warm temperate areas from east of Sale, Victoria, north to the Great Lakes on the New South Wales Mid North Coast to the south of Gladstone on the eastern coast of Australia. The community is on Quaternary alluvial soils, which may be soaked, waterlogged or overflowed, which include the riparian zones close to rivers and creeks, floodplain and associated depressions.

== Flora ==
Varying from tall open forests to woodlands, the community is dominated by Angophora floribunda, Angophora subvelutina, Eucalyptus amplifolia and Eucalyptus tereticornis. In the south, more temperate species are present such as, Eucalyptus baueriana, Eucalyptus bosistoana, Eucalyptus botryoides, Eucalyptus elata, Eucalyptus longifolia, Eucalyptus ovata and Eucalyptus viminalis.

Non-eucalypts include Melaleuca spp, Allocasuarina littoralis, Elaeocarpus reticulatus, Casuarina cunninghamiana, Casuarina glauca, Glochidion ferdinandi, Lophostemon suaveolens, Alphitonia excelsa and Allocasuarina torulosa. Shrubs include Acacia floribunda, Prostanthera lasianthos, Breynia oblongifolia, Bursaria spinosa, Goodenia ovata, Pittosporum revolutum and Plectranthus parviflorus, in addition to scramblers, forbs and vines.

== Fauna ==
Mammals include Pseudocheirus peregrinus, Pteropus poliocephalus, Phascogale tapoatafa, Trichosurus vulpecula, Acrobates pygmaeus, Petaurus australis, Petaurus breviceps, Petaurus norfolcensis, Petauroides volans and Cercartetus nanus. Birds include Haliastur sphenurus, Haliastur indus, Haliaeetus leucogaster, Pandion haliaetus and Erythrotriorchis radiatus.

== See also ==
- Coastal Swamp Oak Forest
