= Baloskion australe =

Southern cordrush
- Baloskion Australe in Tasmania, Australia (2012)

Scientific classification
- Kingdom: Plantae
- Clade: Tracheophytes
- Clade: Angiosperms
- Clade: Monocots
- Clade: Commelinids
- Order: Poales
- Family: Restionaceae
- Genus: Baloskion
- Species: B. australe

Binomial name
- Baloskion australe (R.Br.) L.A.S.Johnson & B.G.Briggs

Synonyms
- Restio australis R.Br.

Species of flowering plant

Baloskion australe, commonly known as the southern or mountain cordrush, is a species of perennial herb found in southeastern Australia.
