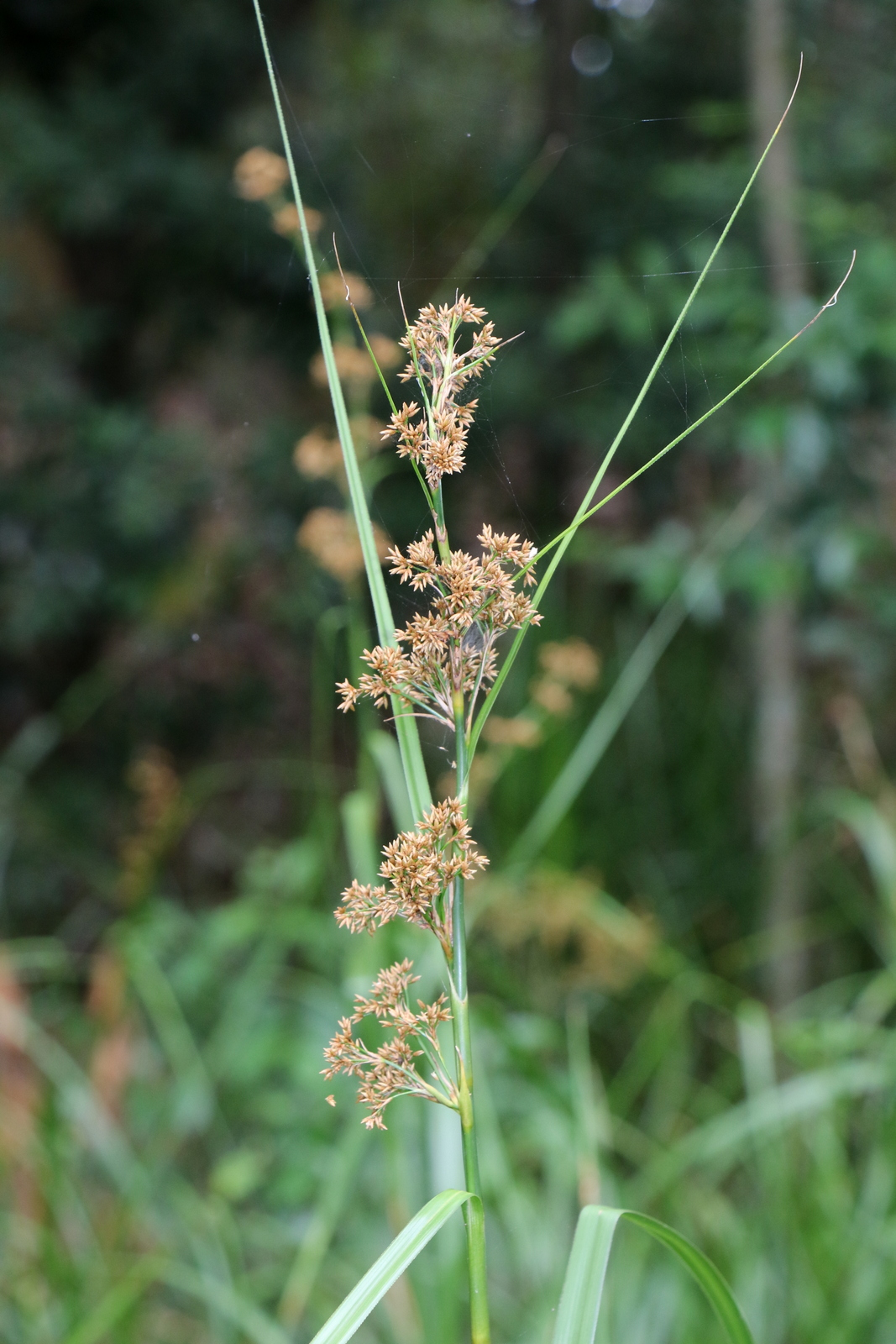
- in a swamp near Botany Bay, Australia

Scientific classification
- Kingdom: Plantae
- Clade: Tracheophytes
- Clade: Angiosperms
- Clade: Monocots
- Clade: Commelinids
- Order: Poales
- Family: Cyperaceae
- Genus: Cladium
- Species: C. procerum

Binomial name
- Cladium procerum S.T.Blake

Synonyms
- Cladium procerum S.T.Blake; Machaerina procera (S.T.Blake) T.Koyama

= Cladium procerum =

Species of grass-like plant

Cladium procerum, known commonly as the leafy twigrush, is a species of flowering plant in the sedge family. It is found mostly in swampland and on the margins of lakes. It grows up to 2.5 m (8 ft 2 in) tall. It was described by Stanley Thatcher Blake in 1943.
