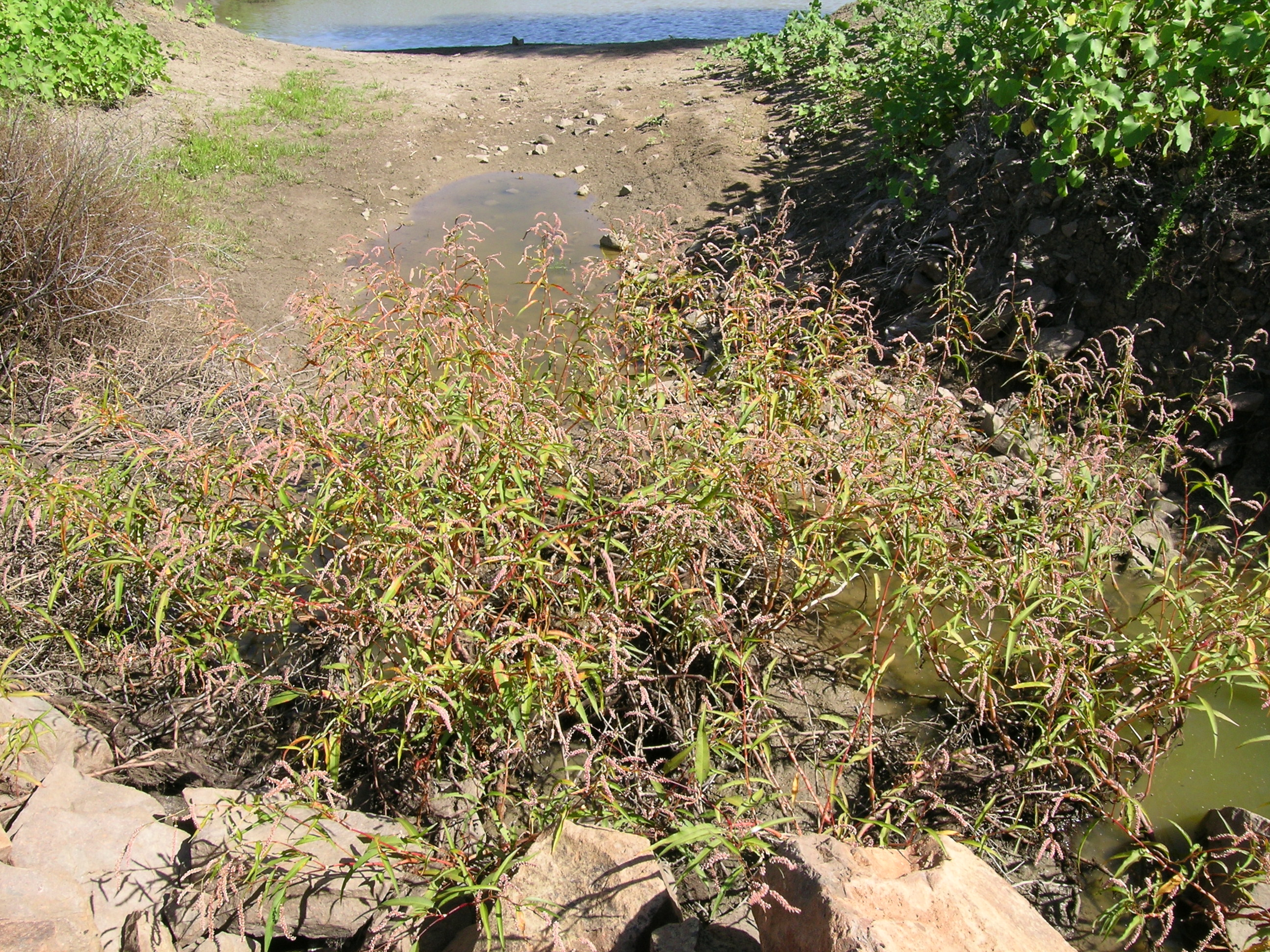

Scientific classification
- Kingdom: Plantae
- Clade: Tracheophytes
- Clade: Angiosperms
- Clade: Eudicots
- Order: Caryophyllales
- Family: Polygonaceae
- Genus: Persicaria
- Species: P. decipiens

Binomial name
- Persicaria decipiens (R.Br.) K.L.Wilson

Synonyms
- List: Persicaria minor subsp. decipiens (R.Br.) Soják; Persicaria salicifolia (Brouss. ex Willd.) Assenov; Persicaria salicifolia subsp. mambillensis Ayodele; Persicaria serrulata (Lag.) Webb & Moq.; Persicaria serrulata var. asiatica Nakai; Polygonum abyssinicum A.Rich.; Polygonum acre Meisn.; Polygonum adoense Gand.; Polygonum azoricum H.C.Watson ex Meisn.; Polygonum decipiens R.Br.; Polygonum divaricatum Poir.; Polygonum erythropus Dammer; Polygonum flaccidum Roxb.; Polygonum glabrum Roxb.; Polygonum glabrum Roxb. ex D.Don; Polygonum leuconeuron Peter; Polygonum macrochaetum Miq.; Polygonum minus Ten.; Polygonum minus subsp. decipiens (R.Br.) Danser; Polygonum rapte Ham. ex Hook.f.; Polygonum rubicundum Sol. ex Meisn.; Polygonum salicifolium Brouss. ex Willd.; Polygonum scabrum Poir.; Polygonum serrulatoides H.Lindb.; Polygonum serrulatum Lag.; Polygonum sinuatum R.Br.; Polygonum strictum Meisn.

= Persicaria decipiens =

Species of plant

Persicaria decipiens, commonly known as slender knotweed, is a species of flowering plant native to Australia and Asia.

Persicaria decipiens is a trailing plant whose stems grow horizontally at first but become more vertical with time, reaching 30 cm (1 ft) high. Its narrow elliptic to lanceolate (spear-shaped) leaves are 5–12 cm (2–4.5 in) long and 0.5–1.3 cm (0.20–0.51 in) across. The slender pink flower spikes appear from November to June, with a peak in February. Cylindrical in shape, they are not stiff and tend to bend over. The plant tends to die back in winter and regenerate after rain.

Persicaria decipiens was among the plants collected by Joseph Banks and Daniel Solander on 5 May 1770 at Botany Bay during the first voyage of Captain James Cook. Prolific Scottish botanist Robert Brown described the species as Polygonum decipiens in his 1810 work Prodromus Florae Novae Hollandiae et Insulae Van Diemen. It was given its current name by Karen Wilson in 1988 as the broadly defined genus Polygonum was split into smaller genera. Common names include slender knotweed, willow weed and snake root.

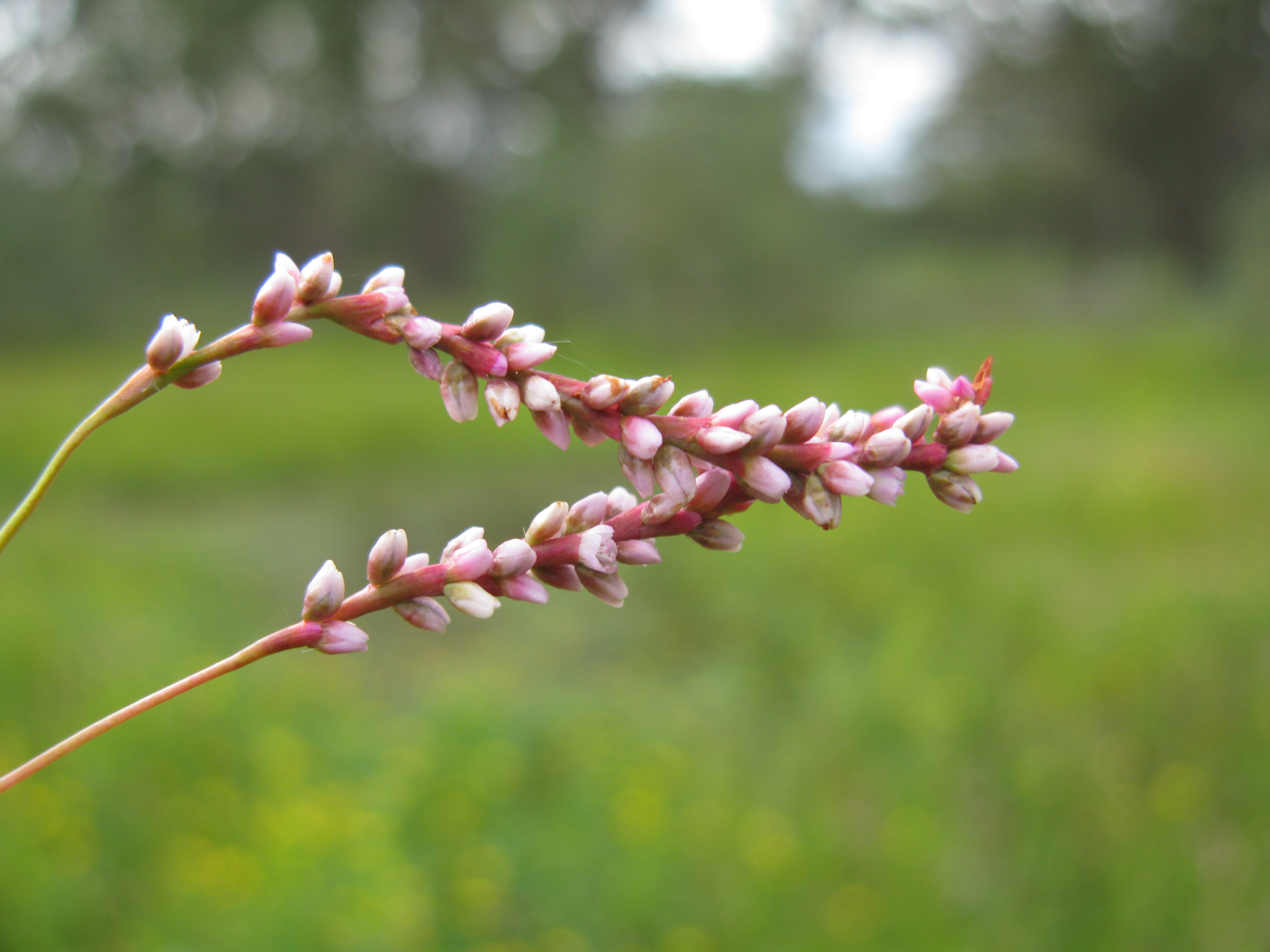
Flowerhead

P. decipiens is found in water and wet soil. It is found across Africa and the Mediterranean, through southwestern Asia, Malesia and all states of Australia, as well as Norfolk Island, New Zealand and New Caledonia. It has become naturalised in Madagascar.

Likely pollinators of its flowers are insects, including honeybees, native bees, flies, wasps and small butterflies.

Persicaria decipiens is not cultivated but is eaten locally in times of famine in Africa.
