= Vietnamese Australians =

Ethnic group

Người Úc gốc Việt

Total population
- 334,767 by ancestry (2021 census) (1.3% of the Australian population); 268,170 born in Vietnam (2021 census)

Regions with significant populations
- Sydney, Melbourne, Brisbane, Perth, Adelaide, and other urban areas

Languages
- Vietnamese, Australian English, languages of Australia, etc.

Religion
- Vietnamese folk religion, Mahayana Buddhism, Roman Catholic

Vietnamese Australians (Vietnamese: Người Úc gốc Việt) are Australians of Vietnamese descent. Vietnamese Australians are one of the largest groups within the global Vietnamese diaspora.

At the 2021 census, 334,781 people stated that they had Vietnamese ancestry (whether alone or in combination with another ancestry), representing 1.3% of the Australian population. In 2021, the Australian Bureau of Statistics estimated that there were 268,170 Australian residents who were born in Vietnam.

== History ==
Up until 1974 there were fewer than 1,998 Vietnam-born people in Australia. Following the takeover of South Vietnam by the North Vietnamese communist government in April 1975, Australia, being a signatory to the Convention Relating to the Status of Refugees, agreed to resettle its share of Vietnam-born refugees under a refugee resettlement plan between 1975 and 1985. After the initial intake of refugees in the late 1970s, there was a second immigration peak in 1983–84, most likely a result of the 1982 agreement between the Australian and Vietnamese governments (the Orderly Departure Program) which allowed relatives of Vietnamese Australians to leave Vietnam and migrate to Australia. A third immigration peak in the late 1980s seems to have been mainly due to Australia's family reunion scheme.

== Demographics ==

At the 2021 census, 334,793 people stated that they had Vietnamese ancestry (whether alone or in combination with another ancestry), representing 1.3% of the Australian population. 257,997 people also were born in Vietnam at the time of the census, and 320,760 spoke Vietnamese at home. In 2021, Vietnamese Australians were the fourth largest Asian Australian ancestry after Chinese Australians, Indian Australians and Filipino Australians. In 2021, Vietnam was the sixth most common foreign country of birth.

In the 2001 census, first generation Australians of Vietnamese ancestry outnumbered second generation Australians with Vietnamese ancestry (74% to 26%) Relatively few people of Vietnamese ancestry stated another ancestry (6%). Among the leading ancestries, the proportion of people who spoke a language other than English at home was highest for those of Vietnamese (96%).

In Sydney they are concentrated in Cabramatta, Cabramatta West, Canley Vale, Canley Heights, Bankstown, St Johns Park and Fairfield. In Brisbane they are concentrated in Darra and Inala. There are also significant Vietnamese Australian communities in Adelaide, Canberra and Perth.

In Melbourne, the 2021 census recorded 90,552 individuals born in Vietnam, and 117,501 with Vietnamese ancestry, and this number is on the increase. The community is mainly concentrated in the West of the City, in suburbs such as St Albans, Sunshine North, Braybrook, Footscray, and Sunshine West. There is also a very large community in the Southeast, primarily in the suburbs of Springvale, Noble Park, Springvale South, and Keysborough. The suburbs with the largest Vietnamese population according to the 2021 census in Melbourne are listed below:

By birthplace:

| Location | Total population | Born in Vietnam |
| St Albans | 38,042 | 8,176 (21.5%) |
| Springvale | 22,248 | 4,655 (20.9%) |
| Noble Park | 32,257 | 3,397 (10.5%) |
| Sunshine North | 12,047 | 3,341 (27.7%) |
| Keysborough | 30,018 | 2,575 (8.6%) |
| Springvale South | 12,766 | 2,557 (20.0%) |
| Sunshine West | 18,552 | 2,562 (13.8% |
| Braybrook | 9,682 | 2,187 (22.6%) |

By ancestry:

| Location | Total population | Vietnamese ancestry |
| St Albans | 38,042 | 9,789 (25.7%) |
| Springvale | 22,248 | 5,127 (23.0%) |
| Noble Park | 32,257 | 4,132 (12.8%) |
| Sunshine North | 12,047 | 4,111 (34.1%) |
| Sunshine West | 18,552 | 3,601 (19.4%) |
| Keysborough | 30,018 | 3,477 (11.6%) |
| Cairnlea | 10,038 | 3,009 (30.0%) |
| Springvale South | 12,766 | 2,978 (23.3%) |

By language:

| Location | Total population | Vietnamese speakers |
| St Albans | 38,042 | 11,102 (29.2%) |
| Springvale | 22,248 | 5,602 (25.2%) |
| Sunshine North | 12,047 | 4,696 (39.0%) |
| Noble Park | 32,257 | 4,473 (13.9%) |
| Sunshine West | 18,552 | 3,771 (20.3%) |
| Keysborough | 30,018 | 3,449 (11.5%) |
| Springvale South | 12,766 | 3,243 (25.4%) |
| Cairnlea | 10,038 | 3,145 (31.3%) |

Number of permanent migrants arriving from Vietnam to Australia monthly between 1991 and 2017.

=== Socioeconomics ===
Vietnamese Australians used to vary in income and social class levels. Australian born Vietnamese Australians are highly represented in Australian universities and many professions (particularly as information technology workers, optometrists, engineers, doctors and pharmacists), whilst in the past, some members in the community were subjected to poverty and crime.

=== Religions ===
According to the 2016 census, 40.46% of Vietnamese Australians are Buddhist, 28.77% are Christian, and 26.46% follow secular or no religious beliefs.

As of the 2021 census, 44.7% of Vietnamese Australians are Buddhist, 29.2% are unaffiliated, 23.5% are Christian (with 19.8% Catholic), 0.7% are other religion and 2.5% are not stated.

=== Language ===
In the 2001 census, the Vietnamese language was spoken at home by 174,2367 people in Australia, making it the sixth most widely spoken language after English, Italian, Greek, Cantonese, and Arabic.

According to the 2021 census, the Vietnamese language was spoken at home by 320,670 people in Australia, making it the fourth most widely spoken language after English, Mandarin and Arabic.

== Vietnamese-Australian to Vietnam relationship ==
=== Media ===
During October 2003, government owned SBS TV began airing a Vietnamese news program called Thoi Su ('News'). The stated purpose was to provide a news service to cater for Australia's Vietnamese population. This was received poorly by the significant portion of the older generations of the Vietnamese community had previously fled after the fall of South Vietnam and still harboured resentment to the ruling government and its institutions, including the state-controlled media, such as Thoi Su. The program was also claimed to lack reports that include political arrests or religious oppression in Vietnam. A large protest was convened outside SBS's offices. SBS decided to drop Thoi Su (which was being provided at no cost to SBS through a satellite connection). SBS subsequently began broadcasting disclaimers before each foreign news program stating it does not endorse their contents.

== Culture ==
Besides local Vietnamese news from SBS Australia, variety shows such as Paris by Night, a mostly overseas Vietnamese production, has become well-renowned amongst Vietnamese-Australians and well as Vietnamese content from Vietnam. Figures from the show such as Nguyen Ngoc Ngan and Nguyen Cao Ky Duyen are beloved personalities by Vietnamese at large as well as many other figures such as the late Chi Tai and Hoai Linh.

== Notable Australians of Vietnamese ancestry ==
- Anh Do – Comedian, actor, author of The Happiest Refugee and brother of Khoa Do
- Khoa Do – Young Australian of the Year in 2005, writer, director and brother of Anh Do
- Kim-Anh Do – Mathematician
- Alexandra Huynh – Soccer player, member of the Australia national women's football team
- Tien Kieu – ALP politician, member of the Legislative Council of Victoria, physicist
- Charles Tran Van Lam – Former Foreign Minister of South Vietnam (1969–1972), first Vietnamese Ambassador to Australia (late 1950s), President of the Senate of South Vietnam (1973), one of signatories of the Paris Peace Accord (1973)
- Hieu Van Le, AO – 35th governor of South Australia and Chairman of the South Australian Multicultural and Ethnic Affairs Commission (SAMEAC)
- Dai Le – Liberal Party-turned independent politician, first refugee and Vietnamese Australian to be elected to federal parliament.
- Nam Le – author of The Boat, winner of the 2008 Dylan Thomas Prize for The Boat
- Tan Le – 1998 Young Australian of the Year
- Giang Le-Huy – Actor
- Tony Le-Nguyen – Actor, writer, director and producer
- Martin Lo – Soccer player
- Trung Ly – Martial artist/action director
- Phuong Ngo – ALP politician (member of Fairfield Council, NSW), Catholic community leader convicted for the homicide of John Paul Newman, and suspected drug lord
- Thang Ngo – Fairfield councillor (1999–2008), cast member of Once Upon a Time in Cabramatta documentary, food writer and publisher of Noodlies food blog
- Tung Ngo – ALP politician, member of the Legislative Council of South Australia
- Giang Nguyen – Mathematician and chess player
- Jillian Nguyen – actress
- Jordan Nguyen – engineer
- Luke Nguyen – chef and owner of Red Lantern in Surry Hills, Sydney and host of Luke Nguyen's Vietnam on SBS
- Nam-Trung Nguyen – Scientist
- Peter Nguyen Van Hung – Catholic priest and human rights activist on Taiwan
- Martin Nguyen – MMA Featherweight World Champion
- Rob Nguyen – Formula 3000 driver
- Sang Nguyen – Victorian ALP Upper House politician
- Tach Duc Thanh Nguyen – Convicted drug smuggler and member of the Bali Nine
- Tai Nguyen – Actor
- Van Tuong Nguyen – Executed drug trafficker
- Vincent Long Van Nguyen – Roman Catholic bishop of Parramatta
- Ngan Phan-Koshnitsky – chess player
- Anathan 'Ana' Pham – professional video game player
- Batong Pham – ALP Upper House politician in Western Australia
- Hanni Pham – member of South Korean group NewJeans
- Hoa Pham – Writer
- Helen Quach – Music conductor
- Hoan Ton-That – Computer programmer and start-up entrepreneur
- Caroline Tran – Triple J announcer
- Maria Tran – actress and filmmaker
- Natalie Tran – YouTuber, actress, comedian, television presenter and writer
- Andy Trieu – Actor and martial artist
- Huong Truong – Australian Greens former politician, MLC in Victoria
- Van Thanh Rudd – Political artist, nephew of Australian Prime Minister Kevin Rudd
- Vico Thai – Television and Film Actor
- San Hoa Thang, AC – Polymer chemist
- Tran My Van – Academic
- Catherine Van-Davies – Actress
- Tracy Vo – Journalist and newsreader
- Tri Vo – Lawyer and politician
- Quan Yeomans – Lead singer and guitarist of Regurgitator
- Jayden Nguyen – Essendon AFL player
- Vu Phan – Professional Golfer (PGA)

== See also ==
- Asian Australians
- Australia–Vietnam relations
- Immigration to Australia
- Vietnamese diaspora
- Vietnamese New Zealanders
