= Canley Vale High School =

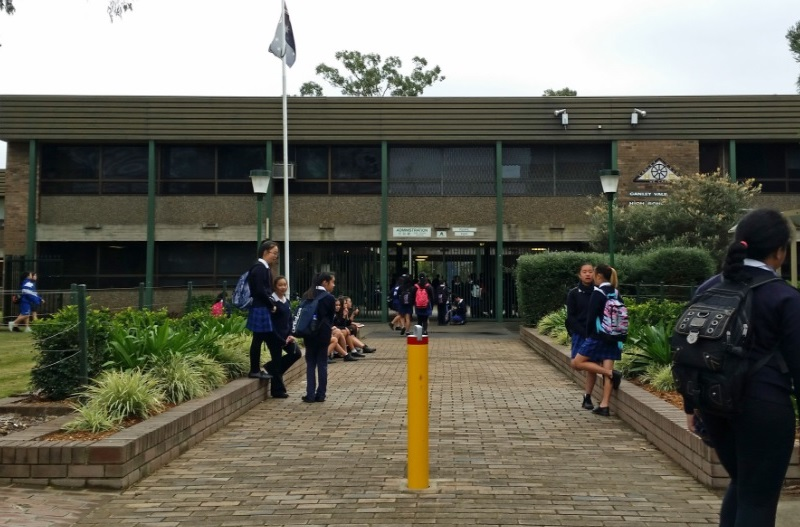
- The school's main entrance (2015)

Location
- Canley Vale, South-Western Sydney, New South Wales; Australia; 33°53′6″S 150°57′5″E

Information
- Type: Government-funded co-educational comprehensive secondary day school
- Motto: We Care
- Established: 1965; 61 years ago
- Educational authority: New South Wales Department of Education
- Principal: Effie Niarchos
- Years: 7–12
- Enrolment: ~1,400 (2012)
- Campus type: Suburban
- Colours: Navy blue and white
- Website: canleyvale-h.schools.nsw.gov.au
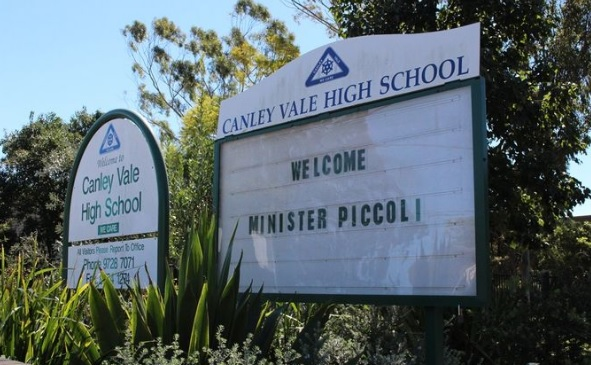
- School signs at the main gate of the campus, c. 2016

Canley Vale High School (abbreviated as CVHS) is a government-funded co-educational comprehensive secondary day school, located in Canley Vale, a south-western suburb of Sydney, New South Wales, Australia.

Established in 1965 in an area that once comprised orchards, the school now caters for approximately 1,500 students from Year 7 to Year 12. The school is operated by the New South Wales Department of Education.

== Campus ==
The school is situated in Canley Vale, a suburb in south-western Sydney (adjacent to Cabramatta).

The campus is built around the main quadrangle, next to the Historic bell tower. As of 2015, the school's foundation bell (originally housed in an actual tower) was restored and positioned on a metal frame over the base remnants of the bell tower, below where it would've been positioned had the tower remained.

The bell was restored in time for school's 50th Anniversary, but for some bizarre reason was then stolen a few weeks later. Fortunately enough the bell was eventually recovered by police a few weeks after the incident, having been left discarded by presumably thieves in a creek.

Other facilities includes a renovated multi-purpose school hall on the western end of the school, a double-storey library, an administrative facility, a canteen, computer labs, a lecture theatre (a single hall amphitheatre) at the school's eastern end, a Timber Trades Centre (TTC), a newly built 'Learning Hub' centre, and a school gym (located in the place of the school's table tennis complex) near the quadrangle at the heart of the school. To the front and south of the school's 'Bell Tower' Quadrangle is the school's assembly area which is approx. the size of 2 basketball courts (As of 2022, the assembly area has relocated to the smaller COLA located west of the school). Opposite to this and north of the quadrangle is a sail-covered turf area for students with 3 basketball courts located in its north-eastern direction. In 2024, the school received a larger COLA (Covered Outdoor Learning Area) which replaced the existing structure located above the quadrangle. Included as part of the 2024 remodeling, the 'Bell Tower' received a refurbishment which added new cladding and an updated paint job.

Orphan School Creek which flows behind the school, and Ada Street Reserve (a federally protected nature reserve to the school's northeast) marks the school's natural boundaries. The school runs relatively adjacent Prospect Road, Canley Vale, with its Eastern boundaries marked by Ada Street. Further north of Ada Street Reserve is Sherwin Park, which is utilised by the school during school hours (in addition to the nearby Parkes Reserve) for sports.

The school is located about 10–15 minutes away from both Canley Vale railway station and Carramar railway station.

== Student life ==
Canley Vale High attracts many students from outside the local area and overseas due to its multicultural environment and student welfare program. A high proportion of the school's student population comes from a non-English speaking background, which includes predominately those of Cambodian, Chinese and Vietnamese heritage as well as students with Polynesian backgrounds.

== Academic results ==
Canley Vale High School has close ties with the local community and has a reputation for high academic achievement and expectations of student excellence; and is one of the best academically non-selective co-educational public high schools in the Liverpool–Fairfield area. In 2016, the school was the highest ranked in Higher School Certificate results for New South Wales schools with the lowest levels of socio-educational advantage.

== Houses ==
As with most Australian schools, CVHS utilises a house system. Students are allocated to a house when they enter the school according to the first letter of their surname. The four school houses are further represented through their individual 'house banners' which (in addition to the school banner) is kept in permanent overhanging display in the school's hall. There are four different houses under which students compete for the swimming, athletics and cross country carnivals:

House name	Colour	Naming	Notes
Bonham	Red	Hard to pinpoint as the origins aren't definite. A likely contender is Bonham Street, Canley Vale, which is located East of the school, branching off Ada St and allows direct access to Parkes Reserve.	
Horsley	Yellow	The Horsley Drive, itself drawn from the Horsley complex in Surrey, England	
Lennox	Green	David Lennox, a convict-era architect who designed and oversaw the construction of the nearby Lansdowne Bridge. Lennox also designed and oversaw the creation of the Lennox Bridge, Glenbrook and Lennox Bridge, Parramatta.	
Parkes	Blue	Parkes Reserve, located near the school; likely to be drawn from Henry Parkes (Australia's 'Father of Federation' & named the suburb of Canley Vale after his birthplace of Canley, UK)	

== Notable alumni ==
- Jason Clare – politician and served as the Member for Blaxland
- Maria Tran – actress and filmmaker
- Trung Ly – martial arts choreographer

== Campus Photos ==
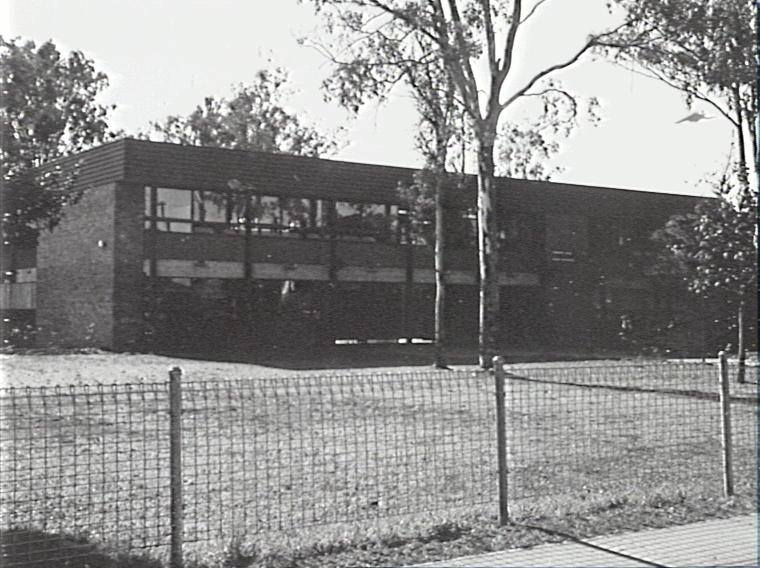
View of the Front of the School (A-Block). Pre-2000s, true date unknown

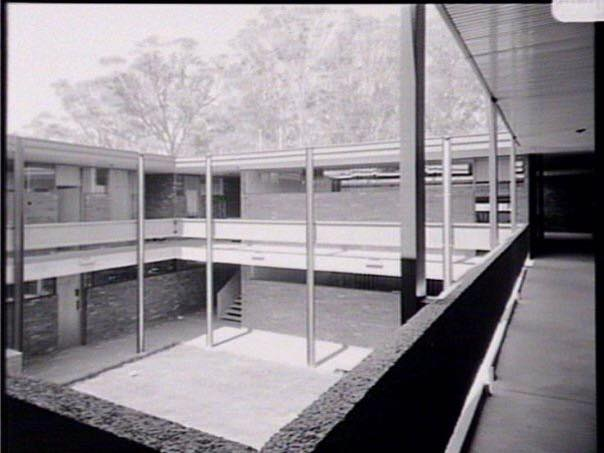
Inside-view of C-Block (Now changed to D-Block) from upstairs. Photo was taken from what is now the front of the social-science staffroom. Pre-2000s, true date unknown

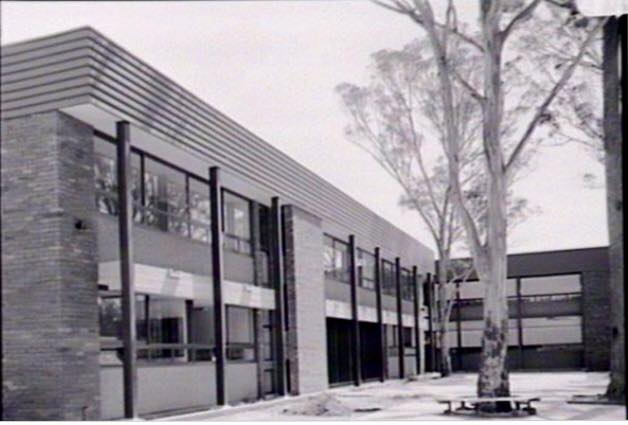
Rear outside view (North & East Face) of A-Block, from what is the Bell Tower. Pre-2000s, true date unknown

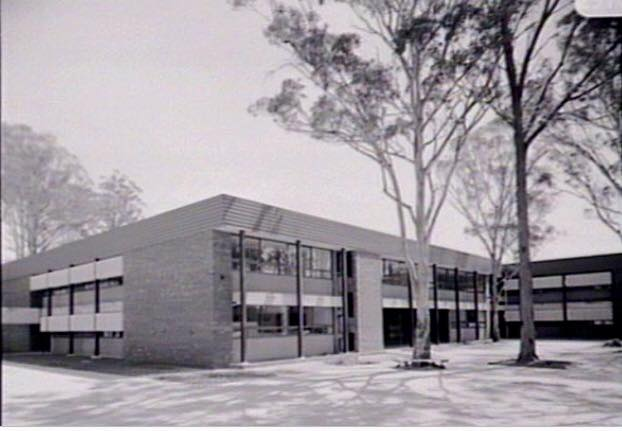
Zoomed out rear outside view (North & East Face) of A-Block, from what is the Bell Tower. Pre-2000s, true date unknown

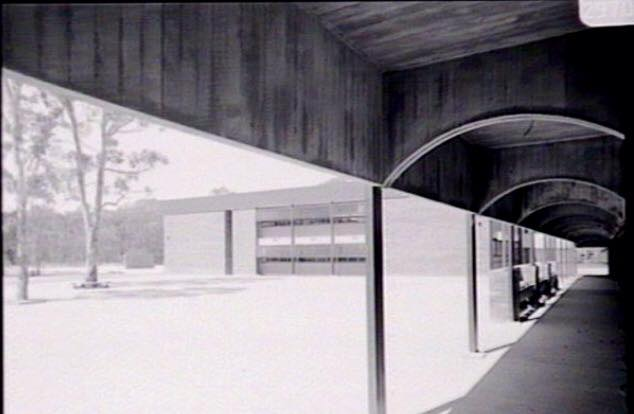
Outside view (West Face) of B-Block, from A-Block's Eastern Corridor. Pre-2000s, true date unknown

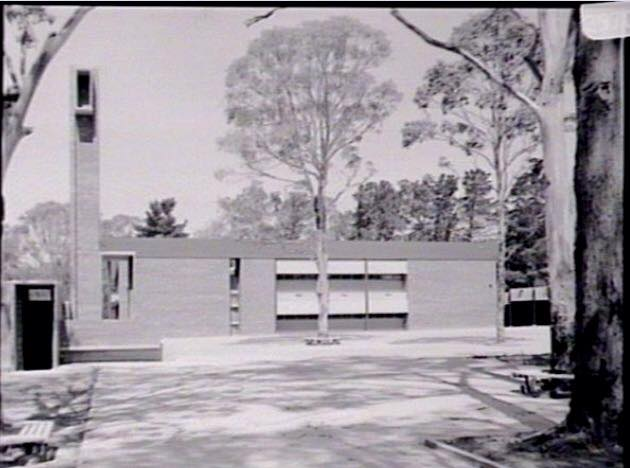
View of the Bell Tower's Western Face, with B-Block in the background. Pre-2000s, true date unknown

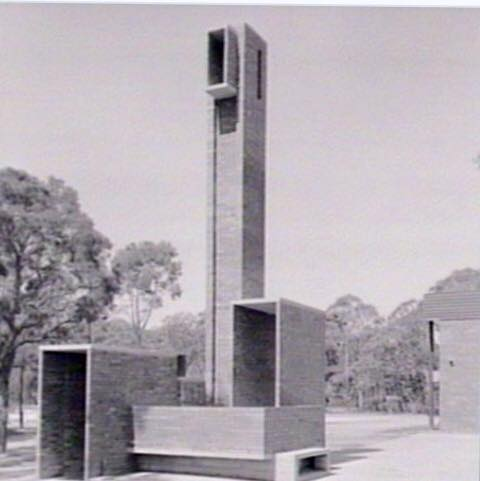
CVHS's Original Bell Tower. Pre-2000s, true date unknown

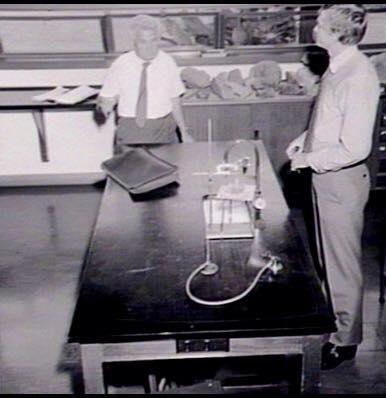
Inside of a CVHS Science Lab. Pre-2000s, true date unknown

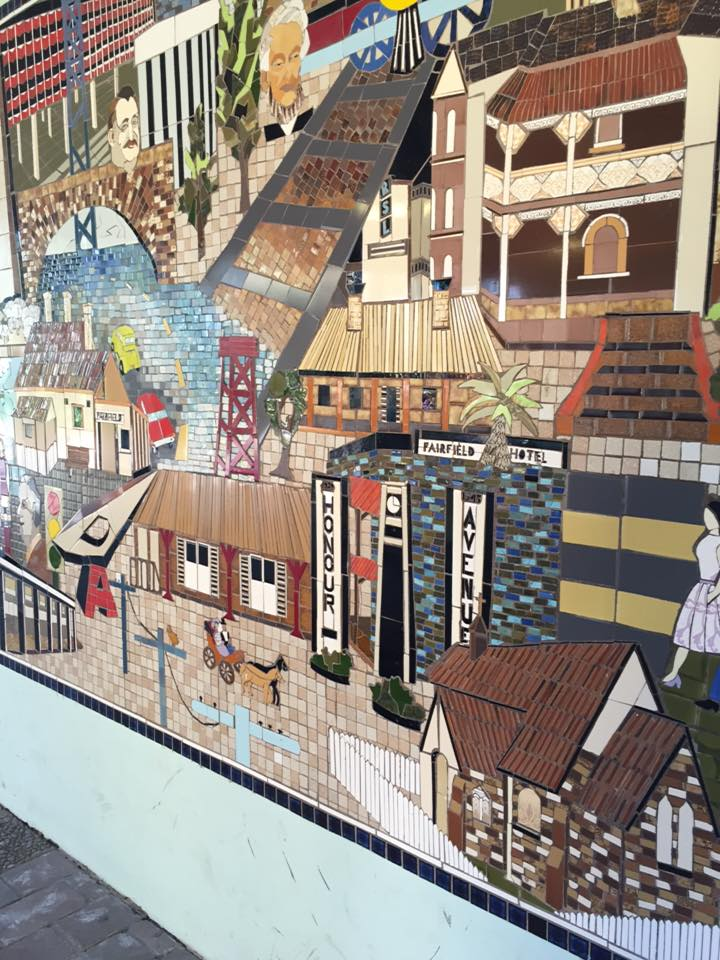
A-Block Mosaics Pre-2019 Renovations.

== See also ==
- List of government schools in New South Wales
- Education in Australia
