= List of Vietnamese actors =

This list includes actors of Vietnamese descent or nationality that have appeared in a full-length feature film or a television series broadcast on a national network. Although it includes some actors that have performed in films produced in Vietnam, it is not a comprehensive list of all Vietnamese actors who have performed in Vietnamese movies.

== Notable actors ==
Name	Notable Appearances
Kieu Chinh	The Joy Luck Club
Hồ Vĩnh Khoa	Lost in Paradise
James Duval	Totally Fucked Up, The Doom Generation, Nowhere, Donnie Darko, May, Independence Day, Go
Do Thi Hai Yen	The Quiet American
Trà Giang	17th Parallel, Days and Nights (1973)
Thuy Thu Le	Casualties of War
Tony Le-Nguyen	Romper Stomper
Giang Le-Huy	(Swing, 2007) (Peaches, 2003) (Spank, 1998)
Linh Nga Nguyen	(Xuoi nguoc duong tran, 2002) (Manh hơn cong ly, 2006) (Quynh, 2006)
Kathleen Luong	First Morning
Veronica Ngo	Saigon Love Story, The Rebel
Dustin Nguyen	V.I.P. (American TV series), 21 Jump Street, Saigon Eclipse
France Nuyen	South Pacific, Diamond Head, The Joy Luck Club
Maggie Q	Live Free or Die Hard, Balls of Fury, Mission: Impossible III, Naked Weapon
Ke Huy Quan	Everything Everywhere All At Once, The Goonies, Indiana Jones and the Temple of Doom
Thuy Trang	Trini Kwan from Mighty Morphin Power Rangers
Cung Le	Dragon Eyes
Tran Nu Yen Khe	The Scent of Green Papaya
Maria Tran	Fist of the Dragon, Tracer/ Truy Sat, Hit Girls, Love Child: Season 3 (TV series)
Trieu Tran	Altered Carbon, The Newsroom, Tropic Thunder
Chantal Thuy	Black Lightning
Dianne Doan	Warrior, Disney's Descendants
Kelly Marie Tran	Star Wars: The Last Jedi
