= Tracer (film) =

Truy Sat/Tracer
- Directed by: Cuong Ngo
- Written by: Nguyen Thi Nhu Khanh
- Produced by: Truong Ngoc Anh
- Starring: Truong Ngoc Anh, Thien Nguyen, Lamou Vissay, Cuong Seven, Maria Tran, Marcus Guilhem, Hieu Nguyen, Thinh Vinh, Hong Que, Quang Huan
- Cinematography: Ross Clarkson
- Music by: Steve Cupani
- Production company: TNA Entertainments
- Distributed by: CJ Entertainment
- Release date: April 22, 2016
- Running time: 90 minutes
- Country: Vietnam
- Language: Vietnamese

Tracer (Vietnamese: Truy Sát) is a 2016 Vietnamese martial arts action film directed by Cuong Ngo, with action directed by Trung Ly. It stars Truong Ngoc Anh, Thien Nguyen, Lamou Vissay, Cuong Seven, Maria Tran, Marcus Guilhem, Hieu Nguyen, Thinh Vinh, Hong Que, and Quang Huan. It is an original screenplay written by Nguyen Thi Nhu Khanh and was released in Vietnam on April 22nd, 2016 and on May 5th, 2016 in Australia and New Zealand.

== Plot summary ==
A woman named Ngoc An An arrives at a place where criminals are. She defeats the criminals, but her superior arrives, and berates her on being too impulsive and facing problems without the team. Later, she is seen training other recruits to be in the special force when her superior gives her another task, which is to sneak into an auction. There, two members of Wolf Gang name Tai Parker and Phuong are there. The auction is held to see who would buy a 200 year old Buddha statue. Phoung sneaks out and defeats the people who are monitoring the auction, and calls Tai Parker that the coasts is clear. Tai Parker defeats the bodyguards who are in guard of another treasure, and takes the treasure. Ngoc An An notices this, and fights Tai Parker. Tai Parker gains the upper hand, but Ngoc An An uses a vase to smash against Tai Parker, winding him, and kicks him out of the window to his death. Phuong sees this happening, and she cries, when the leader of Wolf Gang name Loc arrives and takes her to safety.

Ngoc An An's superior reveals that Tai Parker was Phuong's fiancée, and Loc is Phuong's brother. Phuong and Loc swear vengeance on Ngoc An An. In a meeting, it is revealed that the reason Tai Parker stole the different statue than the one that was auctioned was because that statue contained diamonds. Ngoc An An insists that this case must be kept secret, and she wants to find the Wolf Gang herself. Meanwhile, Loc's henchmen reveal Ngoc An An's identity, and Loc sends an assassin to kill her. It is revealed that Ngoc An An has her brother name Binh in her home who has some mental disability. After putting him to sleep, Ngoc An An is attacked by the assassin, but she defeats him. Her superior tells her to get some rest after arresting him.

Loc meets Kien Lang Tu, who gives him the drugs and diamonds he snuck away. Loc wants Kien to take care of Ngoc An An, and Phong arrives and wants to help. Loc slaps her in front of everyone, and tells her not to screw the big picture because of her personal vendetta. Phuong leaves angrily, and Loc tells Kien to take care of Hoang Skull gang. A truck with drugs carried by the Hoang Skull gang members stop when they see a body on the road. It is revealed that Kien tricked them, and defeats the members before taking the drugs.

In a meeting between Kien and Loc, Kien expresses regret of not being at the auction and protecting Tai Parker. Loc tells Kien to make sure Phuong is safe. Meanwhile, Ngoc An An meets her superior and says that there was a truck that was stranded in the middle of the road, and had 1.5 million dollars in it. Her superior says they have no authority in the case, but Ngoc An An says that it was in a road known for drug trafficking, and thinks it is related to the Wolf Gang. Her superior tells her no, that she doesn't know when to stop. It is also known that her superior name is Minh. Minh then tells her that she can investigate though, and he would take care of Binh.

She goes into a luxury house for her hideout, and Minh tells her that the Wolf Gang actually organized the auction, and tells her to be careful. Minh interviews a person who works in the auction, and the person says that she didn't know there was diamonds in the statue. Minh says that they will continue this interview later. While in a restaurant, Ngoc An An takes a picture of two members of Wolf Gang who unsuccessfully try to threaten a girl to give them money. She sends it to Minh, and follows them to their hideout, and is nearly spotted. The next day, Loc throws a party. Ngoc An An sneaks in, and takes out a girl named Melody who was about to have intercourse with a Wolf Gang member. She notices three men name Shark, Sheng and Cruise, who is wanted by CIA, MI6 and the Interpol. Ngoc An An sneaks in the house, where she is found by Phuong, who she defeats by throwing her off the house and into the pool. Phuong grabs a sniper rifle, and shoots Ngoc An An, but she escapes.

It is revealed that Ngoc An An stole a laptop that had all the people involved in Drug trafficking, and sends it to Minh. Kien tracks down Ngoc An An, and defeats her and handcuffs her to the bed. Kien gives the laptop back to Loc, but tells Loc that the evidence has been leaked. Loc tells Kien to find Sheng. Meanwhile, Ngoc An An finds Minh, and wants to get incriminating evidence against Wolf Gang, but he can't do that because only people higher than he is can do that, and she can't do it independently. Minh then starts capturing people who are in drug trafficking. Minh finds out that Shark has been killed. Loc meets with Kien, and tells him that there is a mole, because even though he keeps on changing information, the police are still able to find them. Mr Shark arrives to make a deal with Loc.

Ngoc An An and Minh and the special forces followed Shark to find Loc. After the deal is made, the police attacks, and Shark is captured while Phuong commits suicide after Ngoc An An defeats her. Loc wants to kill her, but Kien convinces not to, to just torture her. After torturing her, Loc is about to execute her, but Kien saves her, revealing himself as the mole. Loc shoots Kien, and is about to kill him when Ngoc An An saves him. After a few days of resting, Kien reveals to Ngoc An An that he is on her side, and tells her that there are men who are higher than Loc.

Minh interviews the secretary and Ong Trum who was also in the auction. It is revealed that Ong Trum is involved with Mr. Cruise. Ong Trum then has sex with his secretary. Ong Trum talks with Loc, and berates him on his failures. Ngoc An An calls Minh, and wants him to do a background check on Kien because she doesn't trust him. Minh says that he will, but it is shown Loc and his henchmen are in the room. Loc blackmails Minh to give out an arrest warrant for Ngoc An An and Kien. Ngoc An An has a nightmare of Binh being tortured. The next day, Loc then shoots down Kien's safehouse, and shows the footage. While Kien and Ngoc An An escapes, Ngoc An An overhears Minh telling the police that they must catch Ngoc An An as soon as possible. Loc and Minh meet, and Minh wants to know where Binh is. Loc refuses to give Binh up, and tells Minh that he is now a wolf.

Ngoc An An confronts Minh, and leaves after fighting him. Kien takes Ngoc An An to his old sparring partner/brother name Hai San Quyen. Kien asks Hai to help him. After overhearing a conversation between Loc and Mr. Cruise via electronically, they now know that Loc wants to order a shipment from South Africa. this could provide a chance to find out who is behind Loc. Ngoc An An finds out that the next plan will be at Loc's hideout, where Binh is being kept. She asks Minh to help her, knowing that Loc is controlling him.

Kien, Hai and Ngoc An An and the police ambush the hideout, and Ngoc An An finally saves Binh. Minh takes out Loc and arrests him. Ngoc An An puts Binh in a safe place, then confronts Ong Trum. Hai and Kien arrive, and Ngoc An An realizes that Ong Trum is the boss. Hai fights off Ong Trum's bodyguard, but it is a draw, and they are both injured. Ong Trum injures Kien, but it allows Ngoc An An an opening to shoot him down with an arrow, and Ong Trum is defeated. The police arrest Ong Trum, and Ngoc An An gives the evidence to the police. The police commander praises Kien, Ngoc An An, and Minh for their bravery, and Ngoc An An says to Minh that for punishment for making Binh be in harm's way, he will have to buy Binh toys. The trio all laugh.

== Cast ==
- Truong Ngoc Anh, as Nguyen An An
- Thien Nguyen as Kien Lang Tu
- Lamou Vissay as Loc Soi
- Vinh Thuy as Truong Phong Minh
- Cuong Seven as Ong Trum
- Maria Tran as Phuong Lua
- Hieu Nguyen as Dau Bac
- Marcus Guilhem as Hai San Quyen
- Mike Leeder as Mr Cruise

== Production ==
Shooting was over 60 days and various locations including Ho Chi Minh City, Ho Tram, Da Lat and Nha Trang. Hong Kong occasional actor; Mike Leeder flew in for several days in Ho Tram to play the character "Mr Cruise".

== Preview screenings ==
Two preview screenings were held at VivoCity in Ho Chi Minh city and CGV in Hanoi.
