= Cabramatta =

- Suburb
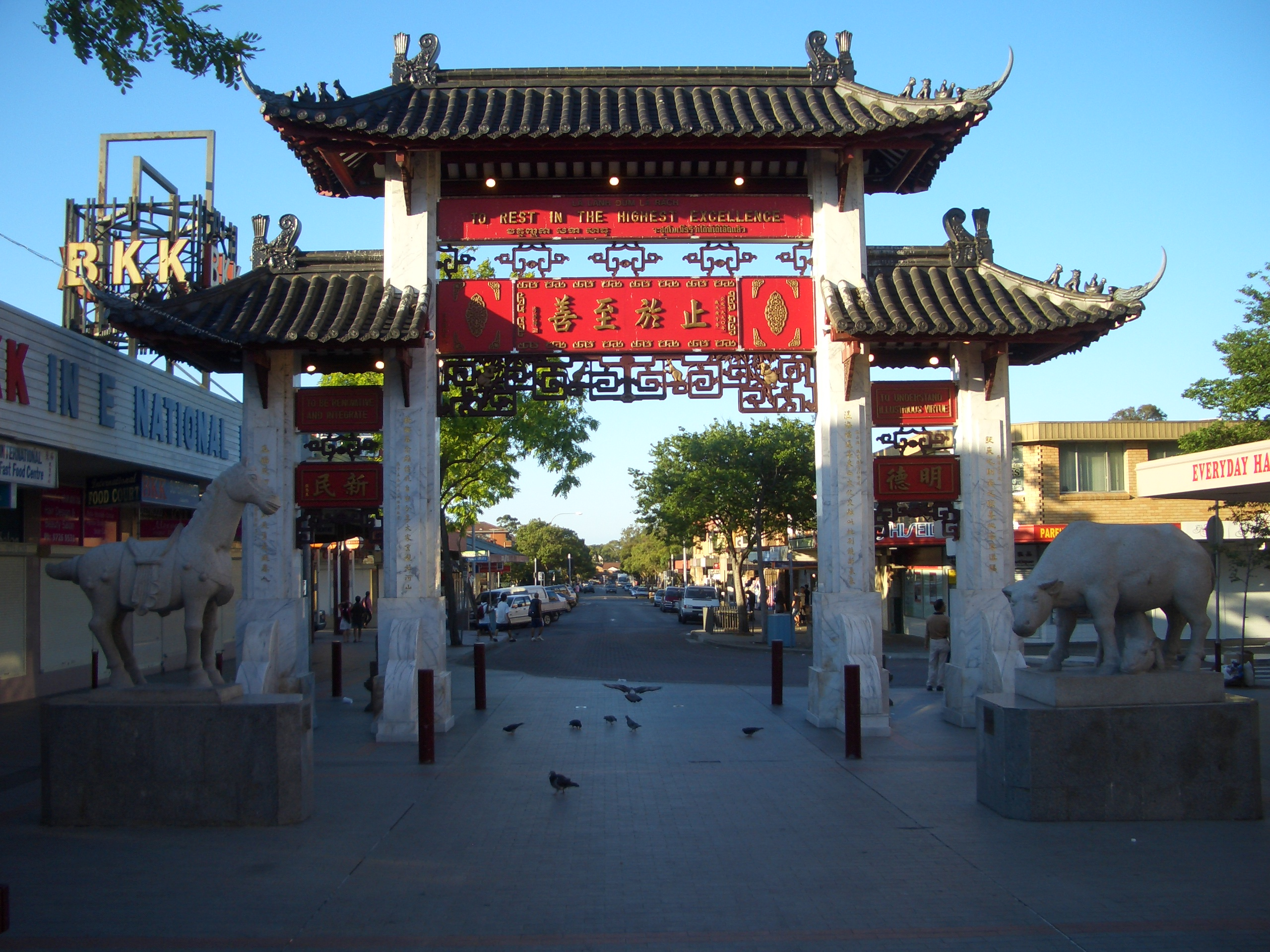
- The Friendship Arch, built in a Chinese architectural style, at Freedom Plaza

- Interactive map of Cabramatta
- Country: Australia
- State: New South Wales
- City: Sydney
- LGA: City of Fairfield
- Location: 30 km (19 mi) south-west of Sydney CBD
- Established: 1850s

Government
  - State electorate: Cabramatta
  - Federal division: Fowler

Area
  - Total: 4.5 km^{2} (1.7 sq mi)
- Elevation: 22 m (72 ft)

Population
  - Total: 21,142 (2021 census)
  - Density: 4,700/km^{2} (12,170/sq mi)
- Postcode: 2166
Suburbs around Cabramatta
Canley Heights	Canley Vale	Carramar
Cabramatta West	Cabramatta	Lansvale
Liverpool	Warwick Farm	Chipping Norton

Cabramatta, also abbreviated as Cabra, is a suburb in South Western Sydney, in the state of New South Wales, Australia. Cabramatta is located 30 kilometres (19 mi) south-west of the Sydney central business district, in the local government area of the City of Fairfield.

== History ==
=== Indigenous ===
Before British colonisation, Cabramatta was the country of the Cabrogal people of the Dharug nation. The term "cabro" (also pronounced "cobra" or "cabra") refers to the edible insect larvae found in timber around the region. The country of the Cabrogal clan extended from the areas of what is now Cabramatta and Liverpool, east to the mouth of the Georges River. The name "Cabramatta" (or more correctly "Cobramoora") means place of cabro (edible insect larvae).

=== British colonisation ===
In 1795, an early settler named Hatfield called the area 'Moonshine Run' because it was so heavily timbered that moonshine could not penetrate and offered no encouragement for settlers to explore the area. The dense woods was the marshy, flood-prone lower Cabramatta Creek area that featured a closed riparian forest, with its woodland reaching what is now Cabramatta Road. Though the origins of the name ‘Moonshine run’ may have been linked to Hatfield's 'American rum' rather than the dense timber.

The name Cabramatta first came into use in the area in the early 19th century when the Bull family named a property they had purchased 'Cabramatta Park'. When a small village formed nearby in 1814, it took its name from that property. A township grew from this village, and a railway was built through Cabramatta in the 1850s. It was used for loading and unloading freight and livestock. The railway station was not open for public transport until 1856; a school was established in 1882, and a post office in 1886. Cabramatta remained a predominantly agricultural township.

It developed a close community relationship with neighbouring Canley Vale, and until 1899, they shared a common municipality.

=== Post WW2 immigration ===
In 1948, Cabramatta's local government merged with the neighbouring City of Fairfield, and today remains governed by the Fairfield City Council. It evolved into a Sydney suburb in the mid 20th century, partly as the result of a major state housing project in the nearby Liverpool area in the 1960s that in turn swallowed Cabramatta. The presence of a migrant hostel alongside Cabramatta High School was decisive in shaping the community in the post-war period. In the first phase, large numbers of post-war immigrants from Europe passed through the hostel and settled in the surrounding area during the 1950s and 1960s. They satisfied labour demand for surrounding manufacturing and construction activities, and eventually gave birth to a rapidly growing population in the late 1960s and early 1970s. The entrepreneurs were developing local enterprises.

In the 1980s, Cabramatta and the surrounding Fairfield area was characterised by a diversity of Australian-born children having migrant parents. Cabramatta High School was statistically the most diverse and multicultural school in Sydney, and a study showed that only 10% of children had both parents born in Australia. While many other parts of Sydney had their particular ethnic flavour, Cabramatta was something of a melting pot.

During the 1980s, many of these migrant parents and their children – now young adults – were to settle and populate new housing developments in surrounding areas such as Smithfield and Bonnyrigg that were, until that time, market gardens or semi-rural areas owned by the previous generation. In the 1960s and 1970s, the migrant hostel – along with its peer in Villawood – hosted a second wave of migration: this time from south-east Asia as a result of the Vietnam War. During the 1980s, Cabramatta was transformed into a thriving Asian community, displacing many of the previous migrant generation. The students of local Cabramatta High School represented all manner of people with Asian or European descent. By the early 1980s migration to Cabramatta declined, and as a result the migrant hostel and its many hundreds of small empty apartments lay prey to vandalism. Only the language school remained: it continued to teach English as a Second Language, until the entire hostel site was demolished and redeveloped into residential housing. A walk through the hostel before its demolition would have revealed closed and boarded-up corrugated iron buildings once home to kitchens, washing facilities, administration and so forth.

== Central business district (CBD) ==
Freedom Plaza is located within the Cabramatta CBD and forms the pedestrian mall between John Street and Arthur Street. The Pai Lau or gateway forms the main ornamental feature of Freedom Plaza and symbolises harmony and multiculturalism. It was opened in 1991 by Nick Greiner, the Premier of New South Wales at the time, as part of Lunar New Year celebrations.

Dutton Plaza, a three-storey building located centrally within the Cabramatta CBD, was opened in June 2016. The Fairfield City Council funded and owned retail development replaced an existing Council owned at-grade car park and amenities building, with all income from the new development to be invested in community projects. The development comprises 31 retail premises and amenities on the ground floor, four offices on the first floor, and 275 car spaces on the first and second floors. The public open space fronting the main entrance on the eastern side of the plaza was named Gough Whitlam Place, in honour of Gough Whitlam who represented Cabramatta as the Member for Werriwa from 1952 to 1978.

In addition to plazas, the suburb features a number of arcades and lanes that contain retail stores, eateries and cafes. Such passageways include Belvedere Arcade, Dutton Lane, Ingal Way and Viet Hoa Arcade, among others.

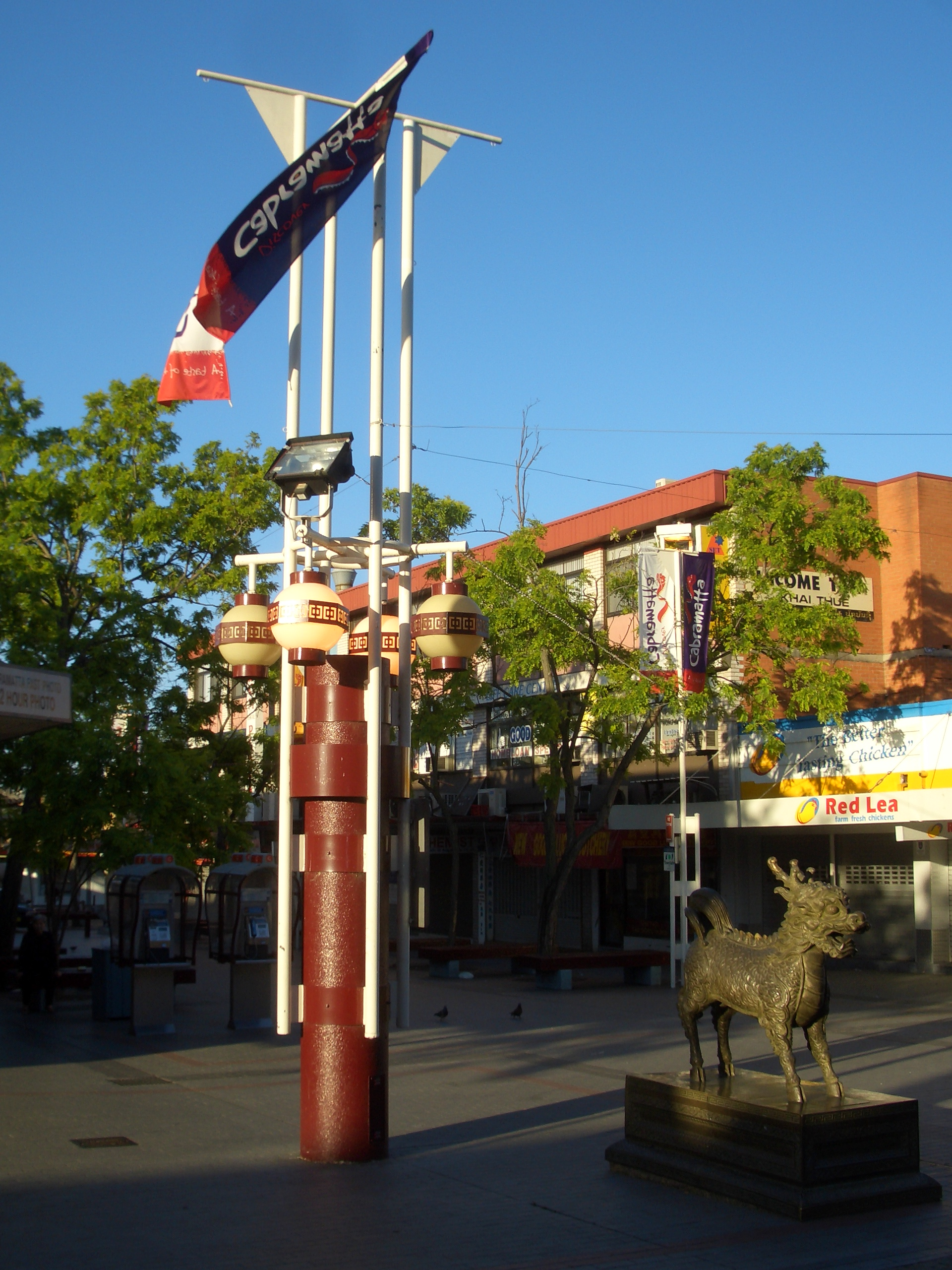
Entrance to Freedom Plaza

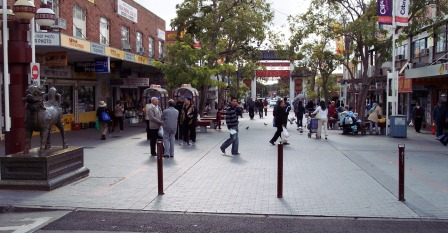
Freedom Plaza, view from John Street

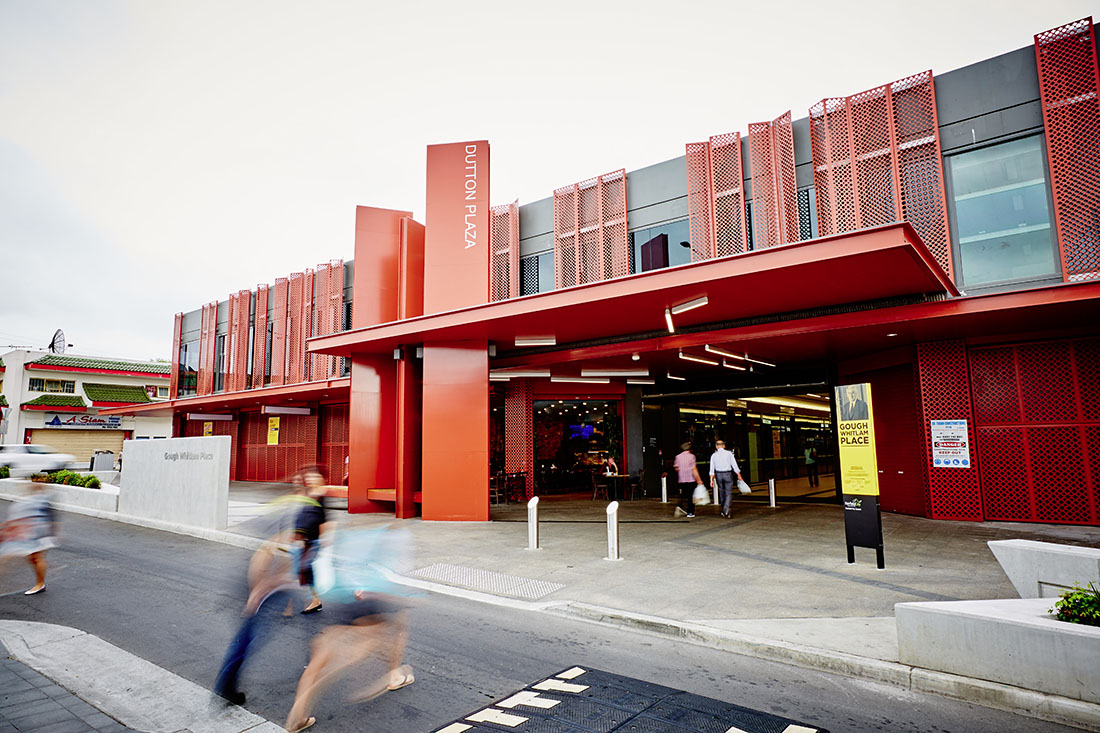
Dutton Lane Plaza - side entrance

== Schools ==
=== Current ===
Local schools in the area including public, Catholic and private schools include:

- Cabramatta Public School
- Cabramatta West Public School
- Cabramatta High School
- Sacred Heart Primary School
- Harrington Street Public School

=== Previous ===
Schools previously located in Cabramatta include:

- Pal College

== Community facilities ==
There are five Vietnamese Buddhist temples in the suburb:

- Minh Giac Monastery
- Tinh Xa Minh Dang Quang
- Long Quang Temple
- Hung Long Temple
- Bao An Temple

== Geography and parks ==
Cabramatta faces the broad demands placed on urban centres with a combination of low canopy cover, higher social vulnerability, high density apartment living with poor cross ventilation, and higher surface temperatures leading to a higher planting priority.

The main public park in Cabramatta is Cabravale Park, which mainly fronts Railway Parade, but is also bordered by Park and McBurney Roads and Bartley Street. Cabravale Park contains children's play equipment, fitness equipment, a basketball court and seating. The park underwent a major upgrade in 2009 as part of Fairfield City Council's Parks Improvement Program. The park also serves as a war memorial. A heritage-listed bandstand, built in 1922 to honour the soldiers who lost their lives fighting in the First World War, is located near the centre of the park. The Vietnam War Comradeship Memorial, a monument containing a fountain and pond centred upon a bronze statue of two soldiers, is located near the main entrance of the park on Railway Pde. The monument was built to commemorate the comradeship between Australian and Vietnamese soldiers during the Vietnam War.

Other parks located in Cabramatta include Heather King Park (located on Vale St), Hughes Street Park, Longfield Street Park, Bolivia Street Park, Antonietta Street Park, Bowden Street Reserve and Panorama Street Reserve.

== Transport ==
Cabramatta railway station is a junction station on the Main Southern railway line. A taxi station can also be found on Arthur Street in front of Cabramatta Post Office with frequent services and many taxis.

For details of bus services see Cabramatta station.

== Demographics ==
According to the 2021 census, there were 21,142 residents in Cabramatta, with 28.6% of people born in Australia. The most common other countries of birth were Vietnam, comprising 37.6%, Cambodia – 8.0%, China (excludes SARs and Taiwan) – 4.0%, Thailand – 2.1%, and Laos – 1.3%. The most common ancestries were Vietnamese 37.8%, Chinese 27.9%, Khmer (Cambodian) 8.8%, Australian 5.2% and English 5.4%. 12.7% of people only spoke English at home. Other languages spoken at home included Vietnamese 43.3%, Cantonese 9.8%, Khmer 7.2%, Mandarin 4.9% and Min Nan 2.1%. The most common responses for religion in Cabramatta (State Suburbs) were Buddhism 42.2%, No Religion 24.0%, Catholic 13.5%, Not stated 8.1% and Christianity (Not Further Definition) 2.2%.

== Notable people ==
- Khoa Do (born 1979), filmmaker
- Michael Dwyer (1772–1825), convict
- Steve Ella (born 1960), 1980s Australian Kangaroo rugby league player
- Jon English (1949–2016), musician and actor
- Jarryd Hayne (born 1988), rugby league player
- Sue Hines (born 1959), award-winning children's author
- Rudolph Hoenger (1878–1952), rugby league player
- Paul Langmack (born 1965), rugby league player
- Gertrude Melville (1884–1959), politician
- Trey Mooney (born 2002), rugby league player
- John Newman (1946–1994), politician
- Brendan Oake (born 1985), rugby league player
- Gough Whitlam (1916–2014), 21st Prime Minister of Australia
- Margaret Whitlam (1919–2012), social worker and champion swimmer
- Nicholas Whitlam (born 1945), businessman and corporate director
- Tony Whitlam (born 1944), politician and judge
- Darren Yap (born 1967), actor and director
- Youngn Lipz (born 1998), Australian musician

== Films or literature set in the suburb ==
Taking Charge of Cabramatta, a documentary by Markus Lambert and Dai Le, was filmed in 1998. The documentary featured assassinated Cabramatta MP John Newman and former Fairfield Councillor Phuong Ngo, who was convicted of his murder, and was funded by SBS and screened by ABC TV.

Little Fish (2005) was filmed in the Cabramatta area. It starred Cate Blanchett, Sam Neill, Hugo Weaving and Martin Henderson. Little Fish is about Tracy Heart, a former heroin addict who is desperately trying to escape her past and achieve her goals and dreams. Tracy lives with her mother and brother Ray in the suburb of Cabramatta, where heroin is readily available.

The Finished People by Khoa Do, drama about three youths living on the streets of Cabramatta.

Ra Choi is the story of four street kids down on their luck and trying to make a life for themselves in Cabramatta.

Once Upon a Time in Cabramatta, a three-part documentary aired on SBS in 2012.

Change of Our Lives (2013) is a film by Maria Tran about the Vietnamese community and hepatitis B, set in Cabramatta. The movie was commissioned by the Cancer Council and Information and Cultural Exchange (ICE).

The Coconut Children by Vivian Pham is a gritty coming of age romance novel published in 2020 set in Cabramatta's 1990s, among Vietnamese diaspora. The blurb reads, ‘Life in the troubled neighborhood of Cabramatta demands too much too young. But Sonny wouldn't really know. Watching the world from her bedroom window, she exists only in second-hand romance novels and falls for any fast-food employee who happens to spare her a glance. Everything changes with the return of Vince, a boy who became a legend after he was hauled away in handcuffs. Sonny and Vince used to be childhood friends. But with all that happened in-between, childhood seems so long ago. It will take two years of juvie, an inebriated grandmother and an unexpected discovery for them to meet again.'

All Thats Left Unsaid a book released in 2022 by Tracey Lien, ‘a young Vietnamese-Australian woman who returns home to her family in 90s Cabramatta in the wake of her brother’s shocking murder, determined to discover what happened a dramatic exploration of the intricate bonds and obligations of friendship, family, and community.’

== See also ==
- Vietnamese Australians
