= Thuy Trang =

Vietnamese actress (1973–2001)

- Trang in 1999
- Born: December 14, 1973; Saigon, South Vietnam
- Died: September 3, 2001 (aged 27); Bakersfield, California, U.S.
- Resting place: Rose Hills Memorial Park
- Occupation: Actress
- Years active: 1992–2001

Thuy Trang (December 14, 1973 – September 3, 2001) was a Vietnamese actress based in the United States. She was known for portraying Trini Kwan, the first Yellow Ranger, on the original cast of the television series Mighty Morphin Power Rangers. She appeared in 80 episodes from 1993 to 1994, which included the entire first season, and the first twenty episodes of the second.

Trang's father was a South Vietnamese army officer who fled the country in 1975 after the fall of Saigon, leaving his family behind. When Trang was six, she and her mother and brothers boarded a cargo ship bound for Hong Kong, a difficult journey during which Trang became very ill. They reunited with Trang's father in the United States in 1980 and settled in California. She enrolled at the University of California, Irvine to study civil engineering, but switched her focus to acting after a talent scout spotted her. Trang was chosen for Mighty Morphin Power Rangers, her first major role, after participating in an audition process that included about 500 actresses. Like the other cast members, Trang mostly portrayed her character in scenes when she was out of her Power Rangers uniform; the in-costume fight scenes were footage adapted from the long-running Japanese television series Super Sentai, with Trang's voice dubbed over the action. She performed many of her own stunts, and was repeatedly hurt on the set.

Trang left Mighty Morphin Power Rangers in the middle of the second season, along with fellow cast members Austin St. John and Walter Emanuel Jones, due to contractual and payment disputes and was replaced by Karan Ashley as a new Yellow Ranger named Aisha Campbell. She had a brief appearance in the film Spy Hard and played a lead villain in the film The Crow: City of Angels, both in 1996. Trang had planned to appear in several films along with St. John and Jones, but none were ultimately made, as Trang died in a car crash at the age of 27.

== Early life ==
Trang Thùy was born in Saigon, South Vietnam (now Ho Chi Minh City, Vietnam), on December 14, 1973, to father Ky Trang and mother Be Trang. Her ethnic background consisted of Vietnamese, Chinese and French nationalities. She had two brothers and one sister. Her father, a South Vietnamese army (ARVN) officer, was tasked with protecting Saigon from the North Vietnamese army. After the fall of Saigon in 1975, he was forced to leave his family behind and fled the country, immigrating to the United States. Trang and her family lived in a detention camp as her father petitioned the U.S. government for political asylum for his family. They fled Saigon when Trang was two years old.

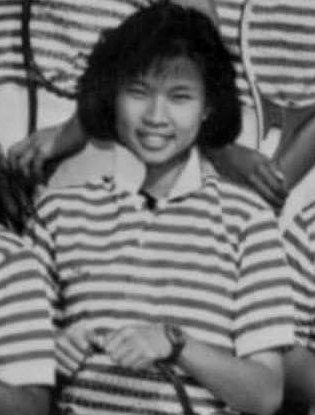
Trang at Phineas Banning High School in 1986 when she was thirteen years old

In 1979, when Trang was five, she and her family secretly boarded a cargo ship bound for Hong Kong. It was a very difficult journey, with people packed tightly due to limited space, lacking in food and water. The trip lasted about eight or nine months, and at least four people died. Trang went long periods of time without eating and fell ill, with her mother having to force food down her throat while she was unconscious to keep her alive. At one point, the other passengers wrongly believed Trang to be dead and wanted to throw her body overboard to make more room for the other refugees, but her mother prevented them from doing so. Trang's family and her father were eventually reunited in the United States in 1980, and settled in the city of Fountain Valley, California.

Trang did not speak English upon first arriving in the United States and had to learn it. Trang began studying Shaolin kung fu, and eventually received a black belt. Trang said of studying kung fu:

It's really good because it builds a lot of character and it makes me stronger as a person, especially going through all the stuff I went through, coming over here to America. It just teaches me a lot about who I am and what I am, and about respect, discipline, patience, and perseverance, and endurance.

Trang's father died in 1991 when she was 18. She graduated from Banning High School in the Wilmington neighborhood of Los Angeles, and enrolled at the University of California, Irvine to study civil engineering, planning to follow her father and siblings into the field. Trang's hobbies included playing tennis, jogging, and reading romance novels. She also had a dog named Nia. Trang switched her focus to acting after a chance run in with a talent scout while hanging out with friends. This led to an introductory acting class at UCI in 1992 where she was spotted for a commercial for the Church of Scientology, even though she herself was a Buddhist. Trang, the first person in her family to study acting, said she intended to later finish her education despite undertaking an acting career.

== Career ==
=== Power Rangers ===
Trang earned her first major role in 1993, as Trini Kwan, the Yellow Ranger in the original cast of the TV series Mighty Morphin Power Rangers. Her agent arranged for her to participate in an audition process that included about 500 actresses of various races. Casting director Katy Wallin said the day of Trang's screen test, "Thuy was so nervous that she almost couldn't complete her final callback." She was paired with Jason David Frank, the martial arts instructor and actor who went on to portray the Green Ranger Tommy Oliver, during the audition. It took place before a room of about 20 executives and required each actor to read the part and present their physical skills. Wallin told Trang to run into the room screaming, jump onto the audition table, and perform a karate move. Trang did so, then quietly stepped off the table, did her reading, and walked out of the room. Wallin said of her screen test: "I loved her and was very proud of her fearless approach to becoming the Yellow Ranger." The pool of finalists for the part was narrowed down to 10 actresses, then five, then three, before Trang was finally selected.

The role was originated by actress Audri DuBois in the pilot episode before Trang took over the part. After securing the role, Trang moved from Fountain Valley to Los Angeles to be closer to the set of the show, which she found to be a major adjustment. Trang described her character as having "quick hands and a peaceful soul", and felt the character was inspiring for viewers who have long desired an Asian superhero: "Asians are not portrayed in the media very well, and there are not many roles for Asian people except for the stereotypes – gangsters, hookers, things like that. A lot of older Asian people come up to me and say that I'm doing a service to the Asian community."

While Trang and the other cast members appeared in scenes with the characters out of the Power Rangers costumes, the in-costume fight scenes were footage adapted from the long-running Japanese television series Super Sentai. In that series, the Yellow Ranger was a male character, but the American show producers wanted more female characters in their cast, so they changed the character to a female during out-of-costume scenes and dubbed Trang's voice over the male actor's performance in the Japanese scenes. This is why the Yellow Ranger costume does not have a skirt like the Pink Ranger, who was female in both the Japanese and American versions of the show. The decision to put Trang, an Asian American actress, into the role of Yellow Ranger has received criticism and been the subject of jokes due to the connotation of yellow as an ethnic slur. Producers have said that race had nothing to do with colors of the costumes.

Trang appeared in 80 episodes in the series, which included the entire first season and a portion of the second season. Trang performed many of her own stunts. She jogged and exercised regularly during her time on the show to stay in shape, and received training from martial arts experts on the set, including Jason David Frank. New to the acting profession, Trang said she learned a great deal during her time on the show: "I'm finding that acting is all about being honest and truthful in every moment. The camera is so close that it sees everything, so if you're truthful and honest, the audience will know." She believed the show conveyed positive messages to children, particularly about teamwork and having self-confidence. Trang became close friends with co-star Amy Jo Johnson, and the two would often have slumber parties at each other's houses. They were together when the 1994 Northridge earthquake struck, which badly frightened both women, but they were forced to go to the studio for filming that day anyway; no scenes were ultimately shot because the crew did not arrive. Trang was repeatedly hurt on the set of the show, and often had to be physically carried by others during shooting because of injuries. Jason David Frank said of her injuries: "She put her all into the scenes, so sometimes things happen."

Trang left Power Rangers in the middle of the second season, along with fellow cast members Austin St. John and Walter Emanuel Jones, due to contractual and payment disputes. The actors were receiving non-union pay, in the amount of about $60,000 per year without any compensation for merchandising for the show, which was estimated to be worth about $1 billion. Trang, St. John, and Jones were all represented by agent Ingrid Wang, and they requested more compensation and union recognition. Amy Jo Johnson later expressed regret that she and the other cast members did not join the three departing cast members in calling for union wages and recognition, wondering if all of them standing together may have led to a different result. Within the show, the actors' departure was explained by their characters being chosen as representatives in an international "Peace Conference" in Switzerland. Trang, St. John, and Jones released a joint statement about their departure:

After two seasons as the Power Rangers, we would now like to move forward to the many new opportunities that have been presented to us. Our Power Rangers experience will always remain an exciting and important part of our lives and careers, and it is gratifying that through our participation in the show, we were able to touch the lives of so many young people.

"Opposites Attract", the 20th episode of season two, was the final Power Rangers episode in which Trang personally appeared; her character appears in episodes 21 through 28, but only in costumed form and not portrayed by Trang. Trang's character's departure was explained in the two-part episode "The Power Transfer", in which the powers of the Red, Black, and Yellow Rangers are transferred to new characters using an ancient magical artifact called the Sword of Light. Archival and deleted footage of St. John, Jones, and Trang were used in these episodes. Trang was replaced as the Yellow Ranger by Karan Ashley, who was chosen from an audition process that included 4,000 actors in five cities seeking the three vacated roles. Jackie Marchand, a writer and producer with the series, said the departure of the three actors was "a difficult shift, and it was pretty intense at the office". Margaret Loesch, president of Fox Children's Network, released a statement about Trang and the other departing actors: "We will always consider them part of the Power Rangers family." Trang said of her departure: "The show was great, it gave me a lot of experience; but it's time to move on, and I'm focusing on doing feature films and becoming more serious of an actress."

=== Post-Power Rangers ===
On January 4, 1995, Trang and her Power Rangers co-stars St. John and Jones hosted an informational session about martial arts at the United States Capitol building in Washington, D.C., where they taught basic techniques to Newt Gingrich and other members of the United States House of Representatives from the 104th United States Congress. Trang and St. John were interviewed on The Encyclopedia of Martial Arts, a 1995 documentary that explored the history of Asian martial arts and the role they have played in the Hollywood film industry. Trang made cameo appearances in martial arts videos made by St. John and Jones. Trang, St. John, and Jones also planned to unite for a live touring stage and arena show. She made a guest appearance at the Little Saigon Tet Festival, an event honoring Vietnamese culture, in Westminster, California, on February 4, 1995. During the festival, she spoke about her time on Power Rangers, other aspects of her career, and her experiences trying to break into film and television as an Asian-American actress.

Trang's first film role was a manicurist in the 1996 movie Spy Hard. Trang was mistakenly credited as playing a masseuse in the film; her screen credit was accidentally switched with Tara Leon, who played a masseuse in the same short but was credited as a manicurist. Trang later played a lead villain, Kali, in the feature film The Crow: City of Angels, also released in 1996. She was not cast until very late in the pre-production process, right before filming began. Trang played Kali, a member of a gang led by notorious drug kingpin Judah Earl, who killed the protagonist, mechanic Ashe Corven, and his eight-year-old son after they witnessed Judah's henchmen murdering a fellow drug dealer. Trang's character was killed by a resurrected Corven after a fight scene. Dougal Macdonald, a writer with The Canberra Times who was otherwise critical of the film, described Trang as "deliciously evil". Other reviewers were more negative about Trang's performance: The Advocate writer John Wirt called her "a flop", and Jon Bowman of The Santa Fe New Mexican said her "sneer is her most pronounced feature".

A cameo appearance by the Trini Kwan character was written in an early draft of Turbo: A Power Rangers Movie (1997), but Kwan's scene was never filmed. Trang had planned to appear in several films in the mid-1990s along with her Power Rangers co-stars St. John and Jones, including Cyberstrike, Act of Courage, and Children of Merlin, the latter of which was to be developed by Landmark Entertainment Group. None of the three films were ultimately made. Additionally, Trang was expected to appear in a TV show called The Adventures of Tracie Z, which also never came to fruition, though a pilot was apparently filmed.

== Death ==
I was so shocked. I remember calling Thuy's voicemail a few times after I found out just to hear her voice and leave her a message saying I'll miss her. Learning about her early childhood and everything she and her family went through leaving Vietnam, becoming refugees and immigrating to the United States, I admired her and her family's strength to rebuild their lives here. I'll always remember her great laugh and infectious smile.

— David Yost

On September 3, 2001, Trang was traveling with her friend, actress and model Angela Rockwood. Angela was engaged to Dustin Nguyen, and Trang was set to be one of her bridesmaids. They were passengers in a car traveling on Interstate 5 between San Jose and Los Angeles. The driver, another bridesmaid named Steffiana de la Cruz, struck loose gravel in a groove along the side of the road and lost control of the vehicle. The car swerved violently across the road, hit the roadside rock face, flipped several times before hitting the safety rail and plunging over the bank and into a second rock face. Rockwood was thrown 35 feet out of the car and survived, but her spinal cord was severed and she was rendered paraplegic. De La Cruz also survived the crash. Trang suffered internal injuries and died while in a helicopter which was transporting her to the hospital.

Trang's body was cremated a week later on September 10, which was when her death was first reported, and her ashes were either scattered or interred at Rose Hills Memorial Park in Whittier, California, though there is no headstone for her. Her Power Rangers co-stars Amy Jo Johnson and David Yost attended the funeral and memorial service. Fellow co-stars Walter Emanuel Jones and Austin St. John also sent condolences. Jones said of Trang: "It hurt my heart to lose her. She was way too young and had so much more to share with the world. ... Her energy drew you in, and her smile made your heart feel safe." Johnson said: "I'll always remember her spunky, strong personality. She was such a bright light. It's hard to believe she's gone." The episode "Circuit Unsure" of Power Rangers Time Force, the first Power Rangers episode to air after her death, was dedicated to Trang's memory, as was the 2023 special Mighty Morphin Power Rangers: Once & Always, which was also dedicated to Jason David Frank, who had died by suicide in November 2022.

== Legacy ==
In the 2017 film adaptation of the original series, the Trini Kwan character, portrayed by singer Becky G, has a scene wearing a T-shirt with "1973" on it, the year of Trang's birth, as an homage to the original actress. Austin St. John, Trang's co-star from the original series, said of the new film: "One of the hardest roles for me to accept was Trini's role because Thuy is gone now. It would be tough for me to see anybody in that role." Some fans were offended by marketing posters for the film that they considered disrespectful to Trang's memory. The promo showed an image of the Becky G's Yellow Ranger standing on her Zord, along with the text "Driver's Ed not required." Several fans responded on the social media platforms Facebook and Twitter that the message was offensive because Trang died in a car crash, with some users replying with the hashtag "#JusticeforThuy". The official Twitter account of the Power Rangers franchise removed the posts in response to the criticism, although international distributor eOne Films, which had also released the same tweets, did not remove them.

The film Mighty Morphin Power Rangers: Once & Always, which was produced to celebrate the franchise's 30th anniversary, is dedicated to the memory of Trang and Jason David Frank. The special was written and filmed with Trang's legacy in mind and focuses on the aftermath of the 1993 series' in-universe death of Trini Kwan. Frank died while the film was in production, leading to the use of additional stock footage and a joint dedication.

== Filmography ==
Year	Title	Role	Notes
1993–1994	Mighty Morphin Power Rangers	Trini Kwan	Main role; 80 episodes
1994	Mighty Morphin Power Rangers	Trini Kwan	Video game; Voice
1994	Mighty Morphin Power Rangers: Alpha's Magical Christmas	Trini Kwan	Video short (archival footage)
1994	Walter Jones Hip Hop Dance Video	Herself	
1995	Austin St John's Martial Art's Video	Herself	
1995	Encyclopedia of Martial Arts: Hollywood Stars	Herself	
1996	Spy Hard	Manicurist	
1996	The Crow: City of Angels	Kali	(final film role)
2023	Mighty Morphin Power Rangers: Once & Always	Trini Kwan	(posthumous role; archival audio)

== See also ==
- List of Vietnamese actors
- List of Vietnamese Americans
