= Pal College =

Location
- Park Road; Cabramatta, New South Wales; Australia; 33°53′38″S 150°56′15″E

Information
- Type: Private day school
- Motto: Empower the Mind
- Established: 2005
- Founder: Seth Pal
- Status: Closed
- Closed: 2011
- Grades: 7-12
- Colours: Navy blue, sky blue and red

Pal College was an independent school located in Cabramatta, a south-western suburb of Sydney, New South Wales, Australia. Established in 2005 by Seth Pal, Pal College had at one time an enrolment of an estimated 200+ students from Years 7 to 12.

Pal College was ranked 97th in the 2008 "Top 200" HSC Schools in New South Wales.

The school was closed in 2011.

== See also ==
- List of non-government schools in New South Wales
