= Change of Our Lives =

- Thay Đổi Cuộc Sống
- Thay Đổi Cuộc Sống
- Directed by: Maria Tran
- Written by: Janet Ngo, Anh Kieu, Tuan Lydang, Bill Tran, Peter Yu, Angela Tran, Rudge Hollis, Teagan Huynh, Elizabeth Vu
- Produced by: Maria Tran, Debbie Nguyen, Mamta Porwal, Amin Palangi
- Starring: Thien Nguyen, Yen Le, Ian Tran, Maria Tran, Joe Le, Vico Thai. Kim Ly, Son Nguyen, Khiem Le, Thu Nguyen, Jason Mc Goldrick
- Cinematography: Justin Gong, Rudge Hollis
- Edited by: Maria Tran, Adrian Castro
- Music by: Vincent Doan, Blanka Vrebac
- Production companies: Cancer Council, Information and Cultural Exchange (ICE)
- Release dates: 27 July 2013 (Hoyts Cinema, Wetherill Park)
- Running time: 60 min
- Country: Australia
- Language: English/ Vietnamese

Change of Our Lives is a 2013 Australian feature film using comedy and drama to demystify Hepatitis B, its myths and misconceptions and set in the backdrops of the suburb of Cabramatta. It was produced and directed by Vietnamese-Australian director Maria Tran. It was commissioned by Cancer Council of NSW and Information and Cultural Exchange (ICE).

== Screenings ==
- It was first premiered at Hoyts cinema in Wetherill Park, a suburb in Sydney to a reception of 600 audiences.
- It had another screening on 29 July 2015 in Melbourne at the Horse Bazaar.
- Selected to be screened at the 2014 Vietnamese International Film Festival.

== Cast ==
- Thien Nguyen as Hung
- Yen Le as Mai
- Ian Tran as Long
- Maria Tran as Bich
- Joe Le as Kai Le
- Vico Thai as Dr Minh

== Production ==
Maria Tran facilitated workshops with project participants and developed the script with them in two weeks. The film was made in 7 days of production shooting. Post-Production was one month at Dong Tam Association.

The movie was shot in Cabramatta, New South Wales, with more than 100 locals making up the cast and crew, and took four months to film. Director Maria Tran said "one in eight Vietnamese people have hepatitis B" and "there's a lot of stigma about having it in the Vietnamese community".

== Reception ==
The film was praised for helping to put a new spin on the efforts to combat the high rates of hepatitis B in the Australian-Vietnamese community.
