= Rudolph Hoenger =

Australian rugby league footballer

Personal information
- Full name: Rudolph Kurt Hoenger
- Born: 14 April 1878 Adelaide, South Australia, Australia
- Died: 8 August 1952 (aged 74) Cabramatta, New South Wales, Australia

Playing information
- Position: Prop
Club
Years	Team	Pld	T	G	FG	P
1908	Newtown	4	0	0	0	0
- Source: As of 8 August 2019

Rudolph Hoenger (1878–1952) was a pioneer Australian rugby league footballer who played in the 1900s.

Hoegner (known as Kurt Henger) played in the first ever Newtown team, the first game was played against Eastern Suburbs on 20 April 1908 at Wentworth Park. Hoenger had a background in Rugby Union, and played only one season before retiring.

Hoenger died at Cabramatta, New South Wales on 8 August 1952, age 74.
