= Canley Vale =

- Suburb
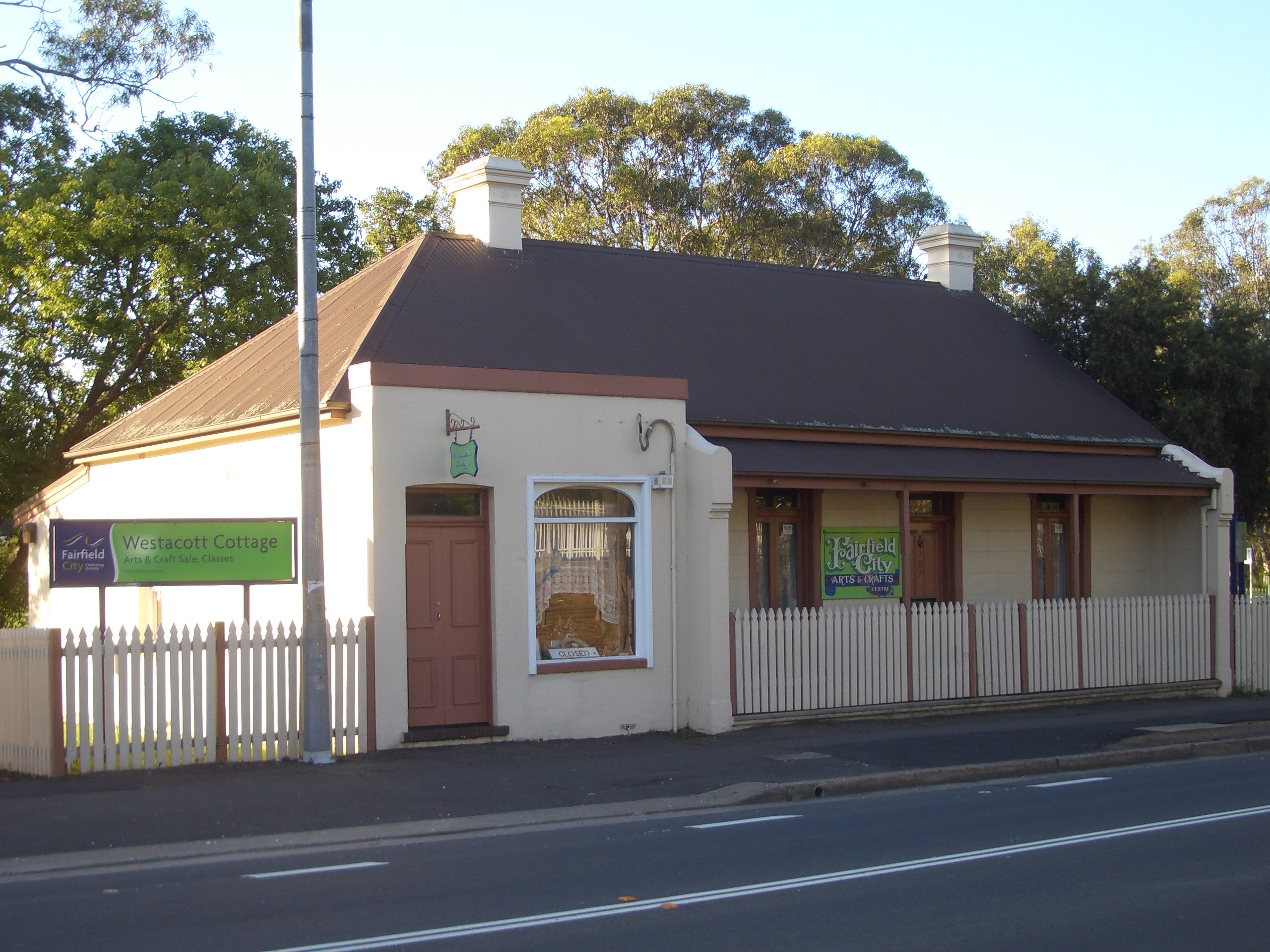
- Westacott Cottage, Railway Parade

- Interactive map of Canley Vale
- Coordinates: 33°53′11″S 150°56′46″E
- Country: Australia
- State: New South Wales
- City: Sydney
- LGA: City of Fairfield
- Location: 30 km (19 mi) west of Sydney CBD
- Established: 1900

Government
  - State electorates: Cabramatta; Fairfield
  - Federal divisions: Fowler; Blaxland

Area
  - Total: 3 km^{2} (1.2 sq mi)
- Elevation: 13 m (43 ft)

Population
  - Total: 10,300 (2021 census)
  - Density: 3,400/km^{2} (8,900/sq mi)
- Postcode: 2166
Suburbs around Canley Vale
Canley Heights	Fairfield	Fairfield
Canley Heights	Canley Vale	Carramar
Cabramatta	Cabramatta	Lansvale

Canley Vale is a suburb of Sydney, in the state of New South Wales, Australia. Canley Vale is located 30 kilometres west of the Sydney central business district, in the local government area of the City of Fairfield and is part of the South Western Sydney region.

== History ==
Aboriginal people from the Cabragal clan, a sub-group of the Darug nation, have lived in the Fairfield area for over 30,000 years. Canley Vale was once a woodland area and was originally part of the Male Orphan School Estate.

In the 1800s, Sir Henry Parkes (1815–96) settled in the district in a mansion which he built near the railway line between Fairfield and Cabramatta. He named it Canley Grange after his birthplace of Canley, in Coventry England. He named the railway station Canley Moat House and had his own private landing beside the line.

"Vale" means valley or dale. Cabramatta and Canley Vale were regarded as a single community and from the 1920s it was known as Cabravale, a name which some organisations still use, such as the Cabravale Diggers rugby league club. In 1899, the municipality of Cabramatta and Canley Vale, which had been established in 1892, was redivided, and the two separate wards were gazetted on 8 January 1900. In 1948, they became part of the Fairfield local government area. Canley Vale's first public school opened in 1884. Whereby the school has remained in operation to the present day as a primary/elementary school.

== Demographics ==
According to the 2021 census of Population, there were 10,300 residents in Canley Vale. 34.1% of people were born in Australia. The most common countries of birth were Vietnam 31.3%, Cambodia 6.0%, China (excludes the special administrative regions (SARs) and Taiwan) 4.5%, Iraq 3.7% and Philippines 1.4%. 16.0% of people spoke only English at home. Other languages spoken at home included Vietnamese 38.3%, Cantonese 9.0%, Mandarin 4.7%, Khmer 4.6% and Arabic 3.8%. The most common responses for religion were Buddhism 35.4%, No Religion 23.2% and Catholic 17.7%. The most common ancestries were Vietnamese 35.0%, Chinese 26.1%, Australian 7.0%, English 5.9% and Khmer (Cambodian) 5.8%.

== Transport ==
Canley Vale railway station is on the Old Main South.

== Culture ==
Westacott Cottage on Railway Parade is the site of the Fairfield City Arts and Crafts Centre.

Thien An Temple, a Vietnamese Buddhist Temple is located on Sackville St. A Di Da Temple is located on Bareena St, and Minh Quang Temple on Chadderton St are in the eastern part of the suburb.

== Schools ==
Private schools in Canley Vale include Pal Buddhist School, a co-educational private Buddhist school for primary and secondary school students. Public schools in Canley Vale includes Canley Vale Public School and Lansvale Public School, both schools for primary students (Kindergarten to Year 6) with an added on-campus preschool, and Canley Vale High School, a government-funded secondary school (Year 7 to 12).

== Sport and recreation ==
The Cabravale Leisure Centre is located close to the railway station in Broomfield Street, but is technically in the adjacent suburb of Cabramatta. It features a fitness centre including a 25-metre indoor pool and gymnasium and meeting rooms for various clubs and community groups, including a Vietnamese martial arts class. Parks in the suburb include Sherwin Park, Parkes Reserve, Avenel Park, Johnston Park and Cook Park, which feature native vegetation and are proximate to Prospect and Orphan School Creeks.

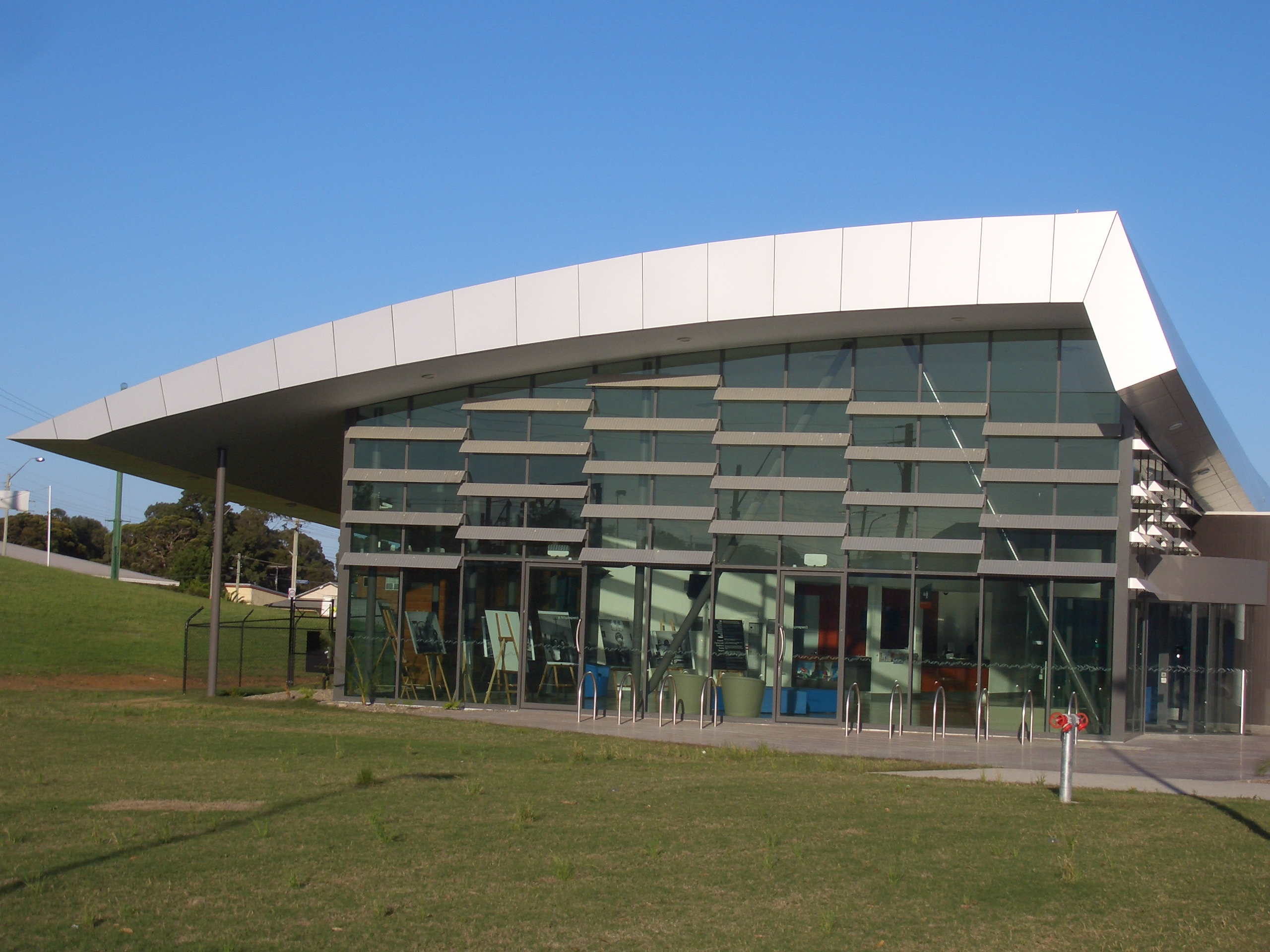
Cabravale Leisure Centre

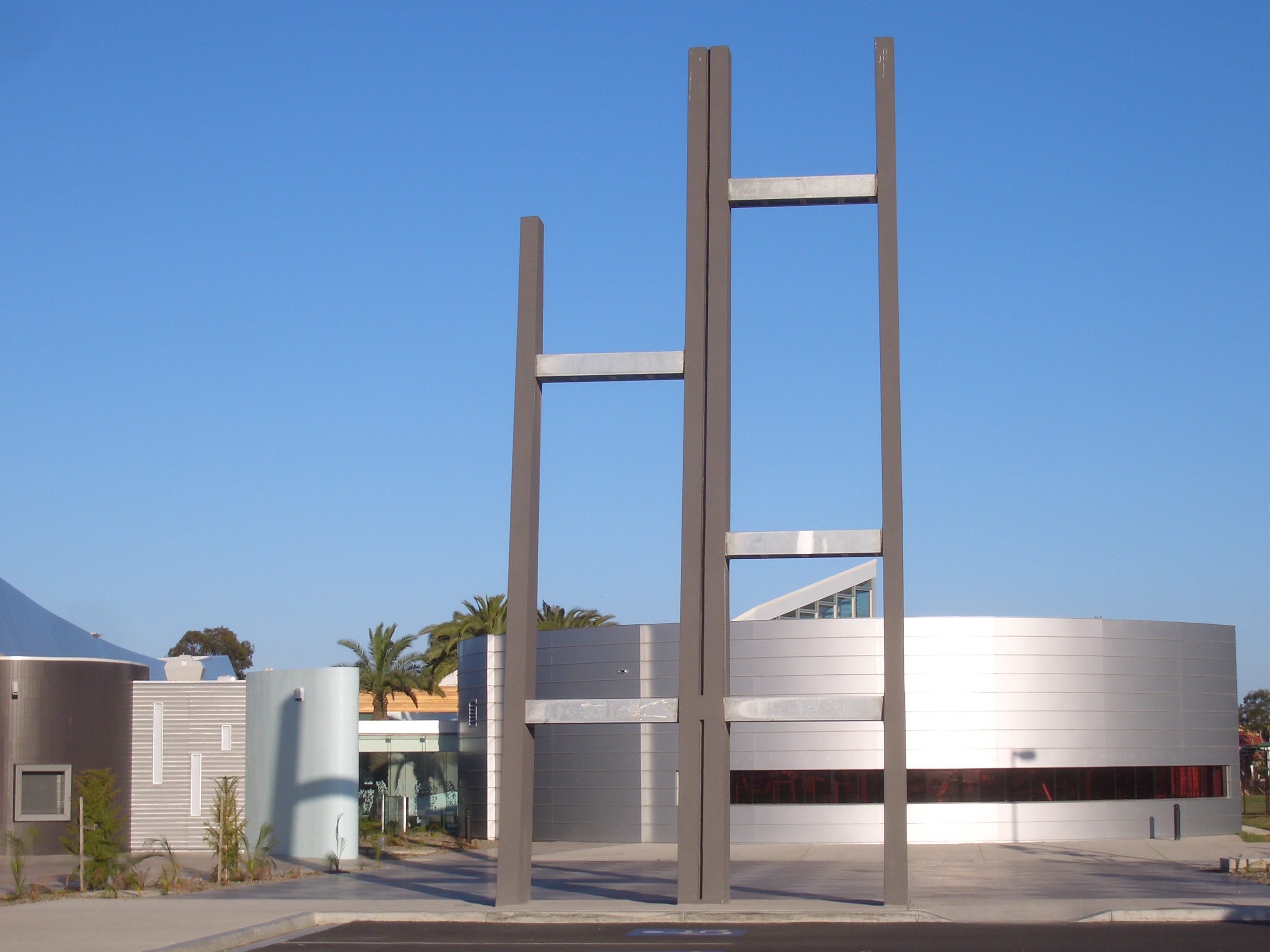
Cabravale Leisure Centre

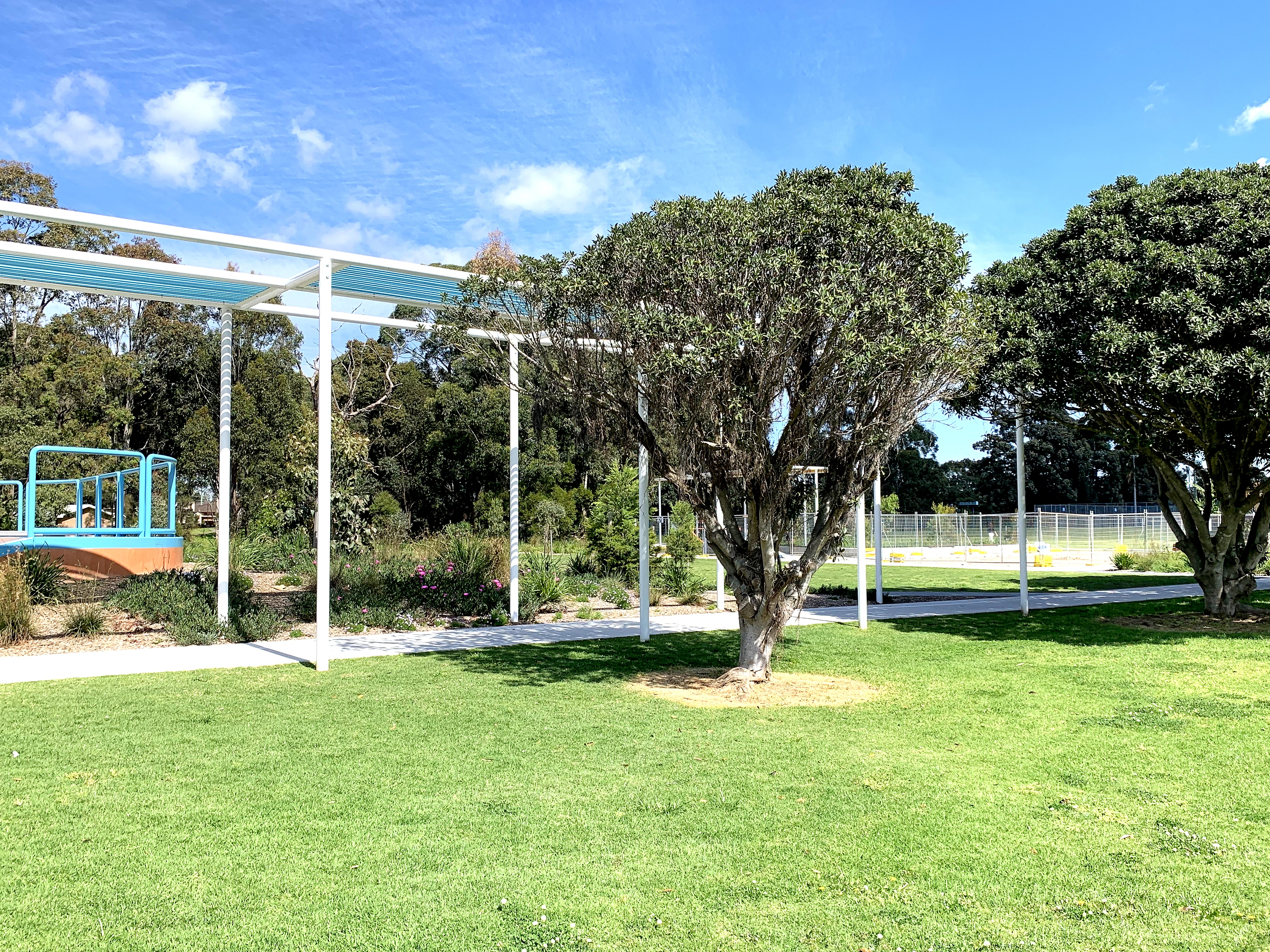
Avenel Park
