= Ra Choi =

2006 Australian film by Michael Frank

- Directed by: Michael Frank
- Written by: Michael Frank
- Produced by: Milli Howson
- Starring: Paul He, Nammi Le Benson, Charles Nguyen, Nina Karen Fernandez
- Cinematography: Rodney Bolton
- Release date: 10 March 2006 (London Australian Film Festival)
- Running time: 117 minutes
- Country: Australia
- Language: English

Ra Choi is a 2006 independent Australian feature film written and directed by Michael Frank for Makovision Films.

== Cast ==
- Paul He as Dac Kien
- Nammi Le Benson as Trinh
- Charles Nguyen as Lanh
- Nina Karen Fernandez as Lucy

== Awards ==
- Won Best Feature at the 2005 Australian Writers Guild AWGIE awards.
- Winner of Gold Remi at Worldfest Houston 2006.
- Screened at Sydney Film Festival, London Australian Film Festival, Rome Independent Film Festival, Berlin Asia Pacific Film Festival, Cinemasia Amsterdam.
