= Giang Le-Huy =

Giang Le-Huy (Vietnamese: Lê-Huy Giang) was born in Saigon, South Vietnam. Giang left her homeland in 1975 and then lived in various countries before settling in Australia. She has been living in South Australia since 1985.

== Acting career ==
Giang first entered the Australian film industry in 1998 as an actor in a film entitled "Spank" and then in "Peaches" (2002) and "Swing" (2007). In "Swing", Giang acted as well as played zither in the background for a small part of the film.

Besides acting, Giang does voice work on the radio. In 2007, together with other casts, Giang's voice sounded in the "Songs in the Blood" produced by the Radio Adelaide. The "Songs in the Blood" won a silver medal in the New York Festival.

== Community work ==
As registered with the Migration Agents Registration Authority, Giang provided advice to refugees and migrants on the Australian Migration law from 1992 until she retired from this industry at the end of 2006. Giang still advocates for women, practises as a qualified couple therapist and helps the community in her capacity as a Justice of the Peace, for South Australia.

Between 1990 and 2008, Giang was employed as a multicultural services program co-ordinator for a community welfare agency. In addition to that, in 1998, Giang created an annual multicultural festival, for refugees and migrants to showcase and maintain their cultures in Australia; and speed up their settlement.

In 2013 Giang Le-Huy was appointed as a Visiting Inspector for the Department of Correctional Services in South Australia serving Yatala Prison, Adelaide Women's Prison, and the Adelaide Remand Centre until 2022.

She volunteers as Justice of the Peace at Norwood, Payneham, and St Peters Council, as well as at Prospect Council

== Awards ==
In 2003, Giang was awarded a Centenary Medal by the Governor-General of Australia for her services, particularly in the social and welfare service to refugee communities. In 2006, Giang received a Rotary International Outstanding Employee Award.

In Vietnamese literature, Giang appears under the pen name of Hoàng Huy Giang. Some of her popular stories are "Tà Áo Bay Bên Trời Quê Đất Khách" (re the history of the Vietnamese costume "Ao Dai") and "Trăng Vỡ Trên Đỉnh Hoàng Liên Sơn" (The moon broken on the summit of Mt Fansipan). Giang has published two Vietnamese poems and novels books entitled "Khi Người Ta Đang Yêu" (1997 – ISBN 0-646-30790-8) and "Màu Tím Pensée" (2004 – ISBN 0-646-43251-6).
