= Maria Tran =

Vietnamese-Australian actress (born 1985)

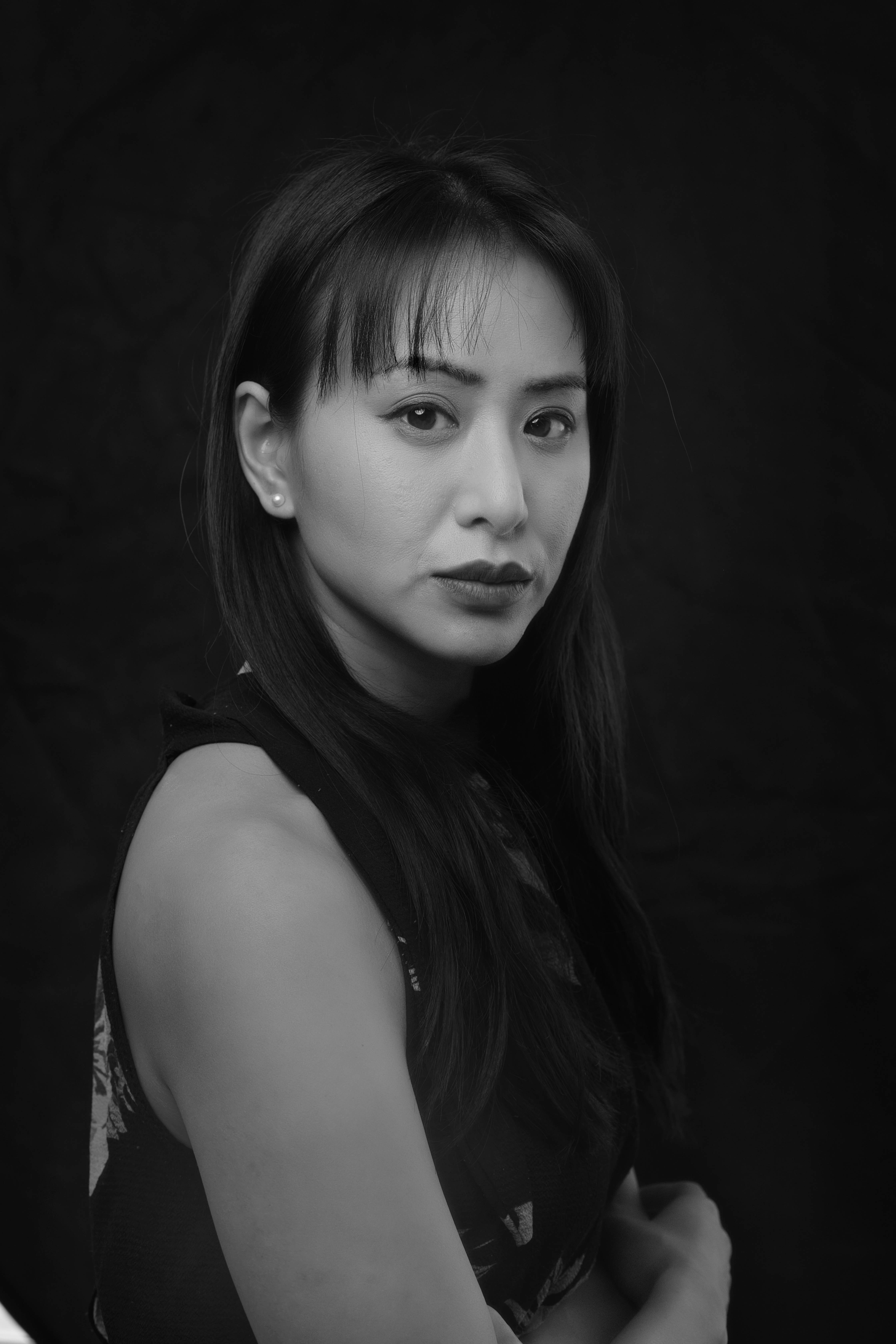
- Tran in 2022
- Born: Trần Vũ Hồng Phương; January 30, 1985 (age 41); Brisbane, Australia
- Education: Western Sydney University, Bachelor of Psychology
- Occupations: Actress, director, producer
- Spouse: Takashi Hara
- Website: mariatran.co

Maria Tran (Vietnamese: Maria Trần, born January 30, 1985) is a Vietnamese-Australian actress, martial artist, producer, and director. She has appeared in the Australian comedy series Fat Pizza: Back in Business, Street Smart, as well as international productions like Fist of the Dragon (produced by Roger Corman), Death Mist and Tracer.

Tran has directed and starred in several independent action short films, including Hit Girls, Gaffe, Enter the Dojo, and Operation Kung Flu. In 2023, she portrayed "Madame Tien" in the Paramount+ television series Last King of the Cross. She also served as producer, director, and lead actor in Echo 8, a microbudget community-led action film.

She has won awards such as the Breakout Female Performer award at the International Action on Film Festival and the 2016 Female Action Performer of the Year at MartialCon.

== Early life and education ==
Born in Brisbane, Australia, Tran's parents were refugees, who fled Vietnam in the 1980s. Her father was a former soldier in the South Vietnamese Army, and her mother worked in publicity. Her family moved to Sydney before settling in Brisbane, where they opened a fish-and-chip shop.

Tran attended Dinmore State School and Camira State School before moving to Sydney and attending Villawood Public School, Fairfield West Public School, Westfields Sports High School, Sunnybank State High School, and Canley Vale High School. She left home at 16 and moved back to Brisbane. She returned to Sydney a year later to finish school, where she graduated in 2002 from Canley Vale High School. She later attended the University of Western Sydney, where she graduated with a Bachelor of Psychology in 2007.

== Career ==
=== Community arts & advocacy ===
Tran first became involved in filmmaking in 2007 through a community filmmaking workshop, and later became a coordinator and educator working with culturally diverse and at-risk youth. She went on to serve as a community arts trainer for several local councils in Western Sydney and was a guest lecturer in filmmaking and digital media at the Australian National University.

In 2013, Tran directed her first theatre production, Press Play, and from 2013 to 2015, she held the role of Vice-President (External Affairs) for the Vietnamese Community of Australia in New South Wales. In 2019, she was selected as an Australian representative for the Australia–Vietnam Leadership Dialogue.

=== Filmmaking ===
Tran began her career with the award-winning short Happy Dent (2008), followed by a series of action and comedy projects including Hit Girls (2012). She was recognized with the Screen NSW Emerging Producer Placement and commissioned to direct community films such as Change of Our Lives (2013), later selected for the Viet Film Fest.

Through ICE’s Produce Perfect program, she developed two original screenplays — the historical epic The Drums of Me Linh and the action-comedy Fury of the Far East — the latter evolving into Tiger Cops under ABC’s Fresh Blood scheme.

In 2009, she received the Metroscreen Multicultural Mentorship Scheme for her short film A Little Dream, which she directed under the mentorship of Khoa Do. She later produced and starred in the self-documentary Quest for Jackie Chan! (2011), chronicling her filmmaking journey and her meeting with action star Jackie Chan.

In 2017, Tran established her production company Phoenix Eye and directed the mockumentary The Subtractor, examining challenges faced by Asian leads in Hollywood. She has also taught stage combat and fight choreography at AFTRS and led filmmaking workshops across regional New South Wales.

Tran made her feature debut with Echo 8 (2023), co-written with her sister Elizabeth H. Vu and co-starring Takashi Hara. Produced on a modest $10,000 budget, the film won Best Film at the Tokyo Film Awards and Best Feature Film – Women’s Film at the World Carnival–Singapore, and was later distributed on Amazon Prime, Tubi, and Apple TV+.

Building on its success, Tran launched The Echo 8 Trilogy, a female-driven martial arts action series produced by Phoenix Eye, with sequels Five by Five and Echo 8 Beyond scheduled for international release in 2026.

=== Acting career ===
Tran's first acting role was in Australia's first kung fu comedy, Downtown Rumble, in 2008, followed by her first TV role on the ABC Logie TV series My Place, Channel 7's Australia: The Story of US, and Channel 9's Love Child.

Tran self-produced, directed, and acted in the action comedy Hit Girls, co-starring Juju Chan. She received the 2016 Breakout Female Action Performer of the Year at the Action On Film International Film Festival. After Hit Girls, she worked on Roger Corman's movie Fist of the Dragon, directed by Antony Szeto, starring Josh Thomson, and filmed in Guangzhou, China.

In 2015, Tran played the female antagonist "Phuong Lua" in the Vietnamese blockbuster Truy Sat

In 2018, Tran was cast as the comedic Tiger wife "Trans Phat" in Streets Smart, and the following year she was cast as nun-chuck wielding "Susie" in Fat Pizza: Back In Business.

During the COVID pandemic, Tran was commissioned by Diversity Arts Australia through their program "I am Not A Virus" to produce 1 in response to the anti-Asian sentiment during that period.

In March 2022 it was reported that Tran joined the cast of the show Last King of the Cross. The same year she acted in the film Suka and The Gift that Gives.

== Personal life ==
Tran is married to Japanese actor Takashi Hara. She lives in Sydney, Australia and Las Vegas, Nevada.

== Filmography ==
=== Film ===
Year	Title	Alternative title	Role	Notes
2012	Enter The Dojo		Fighter	also producer
2012	Hit Girls	《职业女杀手》	Charlie Vu (Lead role)	also co-director
2013	Change of our Lives		Bich	also director and producer
2015	Fist of the Dragon	《猛龍追擊8小時》	Zhen	
2015	The Challenge Letter	《挑戰書》	Jennifer	
2016	Tracer	Truy Sát	Phuong Lua	
2021	Operation Kung Flu		Phoenix	also director and producer
2023	Suka		Lyn	
2023	Knot		Karen Pang	
2023	The Gift That Gives		Erin Huynh	
2023	Echo 8		Echo 8	also director and producer

=== Television ===
Year	Title	Role	Notes
2008	Downtown Rumble	Apprentice	Main cast
2009	My Place	Thi Mai	1 episode
2015	Australia: The Story of Us	Vietnamese Mother	1 episode
2015	How Not to Behave	Beach Girl	2 episodes
2015	Love Child	Hoang	Supporting cast (season 3)
2017	Tiger Cops	Tiger	Main cast
2018	Street Smart	Trans Phat	8 episodes, Supporting cast
2019–21	Fat Pizza: Back In Business	Suzie	4 episodes, Supporting cast
2019	Deadly Women	Thi	1 episode
2019	Nightwalkers	Flashback Vamp	1 episode
2023	Local Council	Kara	2 episodes, Supporting cast
2023	Last King of the Cross	Tran Cat Tien	Main cast

== Awards ==
- Selected as 40 Under 40 Most Influential Asian-Australians 2021.
- Tran was the recipient of the Create NSW 2018 Western Sydney Fellowship. She was awarded $50,000 for her year-long career development and project "Femme Fatales: Seen and Heard".
- Short film Happy Dent, which Tran directed, won Best Film and Achievement in Directing at the 2008 Shortcuts Film Festival.
- She was the People's Choice and a runner-up for the "Dreamgirls" multicultural pageant in 2014.
