= Trung Ly =

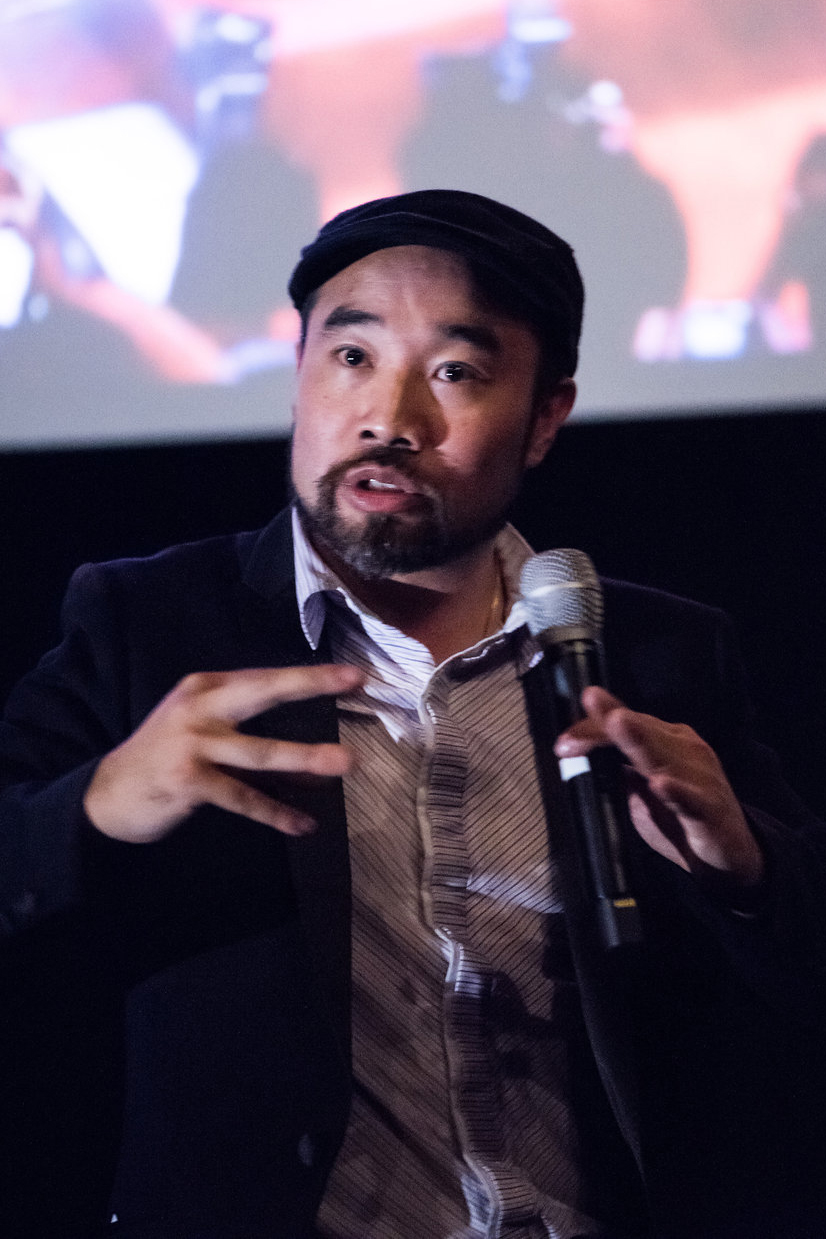
- At the Australian screening of "Truy Sat/Tracer" in Sydney
- Born: Lý Quang Trung; 2 September 1975 (age 50); Saigon, Vietnam
- Known for: Martial artist, fight choreographer, action director

Trung Ly is a Vietnamese martial artist, fight choreographer, and action director. He has gained recognition as the fight choreographer for several notable productions, including Roger Corman's martial arts film Fist of the Dragon, the ABC TV series Maximum Choppage, and Truong Ngoc Anh's Vietnamese police movie Tracer.

== Early life ==
Trung Ly was born in Saigon, Vietnam, in 1975, and his family migrated to Sydney, Australia, when he was five years old. He started learning martial arts at the age of nine and trained in Vovinam and Shaolin Kung Fu before transitioning to Hapkido in 1997. He attended Belmore Public School and Canley Vale High School before studying engineering at the University of Western Sydney. In addition to his martial arts and engineering background, he is also a licensed aircraft maintenance engineer with a focus on mechanical and avionics.

== Career ==
Trung Ly is a martial arts practitioner who spent over 20 years teaching young Vietnamese Australians about their cultural heritage and the values embodied in martial arts. He also worked as a fight choreographer and action camera operator for several films, including Enter the Dojo, Gaffa, Hit Girls, Fist of the Dragon, Death Mist, and Vietnam's blockbuster Tracer.
