= Lennox House, Parramatta =

Lennox House
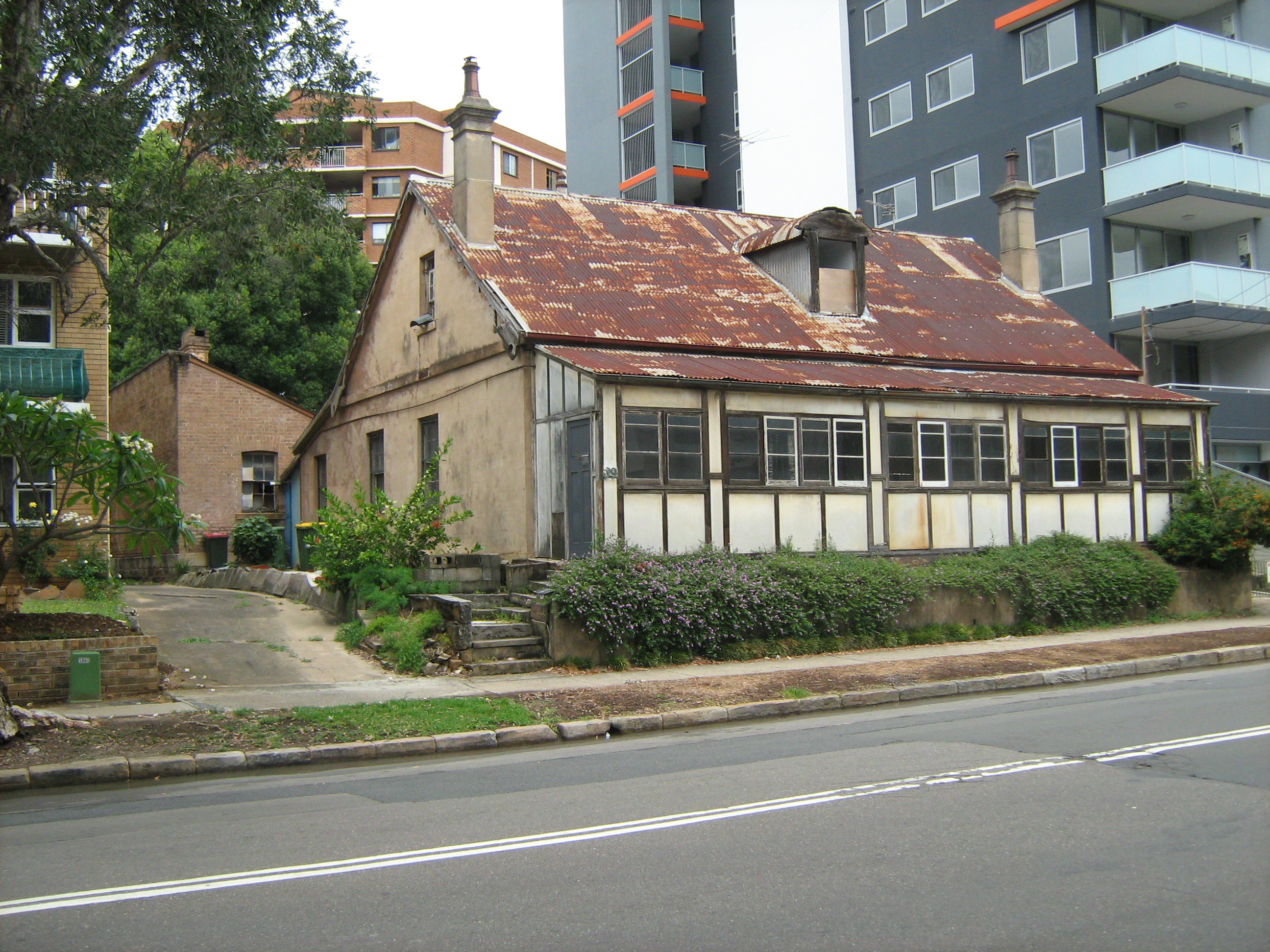
- Lennox House in 2014

- Location within Sydney Location within Australia
- 33.8190°S 151.0027°E
- Location: 39 Campbell Street, Parramatta, Sydney, New South Wales, Australia

Site notes
- Architect: David Lennox

New South Wales Heritage Register
- Official name: Lennox House; David Lennox's House
- Type: state heritage (complex / group)
- Designated: 2 April 1999
- Reference no.: 751
- Type: House
- Category: Residential buildings (private)
- Builders: possibly James Houison

Lennox House is a heritage-listed residence built around 1855 and located at 39 Campbell Street, Parramatta, Sydney, New South Wales, Australia. It was designed by David Lennox.

== History ==
David Lennox bought the land for 200 pounds from William Goodin in 1854 and the house was constructed the following year, being shown on the 1855 plan of Parramatta street alignments.

David Lennox (1788-1873), bridge-builder, was born at Ayr, Scotland. His wife having died in 1828, he took passage to Australia on the Florentia, arriving in Sydney in August 1832.

He was a master mason and had already occupied responsible positions in Britain for more than twenty years, working on many bridges, including Thomas Telford's Menai Suspension Bridge and a 150-foot (46 m) span stone-arch bridge over the River Severn at Gloucester.

When he had sailed for Australia in 1832 he left behind two young daughters in the care of his sister, who afterwards married James Dalziel. In 1836 the Dalziels, with their own family and Lennox's two daughters, migrated to Australia, arriving in Sydney in January 1837. The elder daughter Mary married George Urquhart, but died in 1841. Jane Lennox married Charles William Rowling; a widow when her father retired, she shared his home in Parramatta.

In Sydney he was at first employed cutting the coping stone for the hospital wall in Macquarie Street. His workmanship so impressed Surveyor-General (Sir) Thomas Mitchell that he recommended Lennox to Governor Bourke as a person experienced in the construction of arches of the greatest magnitude in England, and thus secured his appointment on 1 October 1832 to the roads department (as Sub-Inspector of Bridges) at a salary of "£120 per annum". When Lennox was appointed Superintendent of bridges in June 1833 Mitchell set him to work on a series of stone bridges, some of which are still standing. Mitchell by his own account, "discovered" Lennox and signed him up to help construct his (Mitchell's) "great roads". Lennox agreed "to plan the stone bridges...make the centring arches, and carry on such works by directing and instructing the common labourers then at the disposal of the Government".

Lennox's first bridge was on the main western road at Lapstone Hill. By direction of the governor it was named Lennox Bridge and the keystones bear the name of its builder and the date 1833. It is the oldest bridge still standing on the mainland of Australia, and for ninety-three years it carried all the traffic from Sydney to the west; until 1963 it was still used by vehicles travelling up Mitchell's Pass on the initial climb over the Blue Mountains, although the main road was moved in 1926 to a better gradient by way of Knapsack Gully.

In January 1834 he fixed the site for a bridge over the Medway Rivulet on the main southern road three miles (4.8 km) south of Berrima, now known as Three Legs o' Man Bridge; this was a timber structure supported on three masonry piers twenty feet (6.1 m) apart. It was completed early in 1835 but destroyed by flood about 1860 and later replaced. Lennox began the Queen's Wharf at Parramatta in 1834 and finished it in 1835; this quay served as terminal for vessels between Sydney and Parramatta. In the latter part of 1834 and through 1835 Lennox was engaged on the Lansdowne Bridge over Prospect Creek on the main southern road near Liverpool, named by the governor in honour of the Marquis of Lansdowne. Lennox received a special bonus of £200 for this work and his salary was raised from £120 without allowances to £250 plus 2s. 6d. a day allowance. Lansdowne Bridge still carries traffic on the Hume Highway.

Lennox's 50-foot (15 m) masonry-arch bridge over the Wingecarribee River at Berrima was opened in 1836 but destroyed by flood in 1860; Black Bob's Bridge, nine miles (14 km) south of Berrima, was a single 30-foot (9.1 m) span timber-beam bridge completed early in 1837, and replaced by the public works department in 1896 with a masonry arch; Duck Creek Bridge on the Parramatta Road thirteen miles (21 km) from Sydney, originally designed by Lennox as a timber structure on stone piers, was built about 1837 as a semicircular brick arch of 30-foot (9.1 m) span; and he produced a design for Bentley's Bridge at Rushcutters Bay, Sydney. At the same time, he constructed a dam across George's River at Liverpool, completed in 1836; and in 1839 erected the town boundary stones of Parramatta. As with all his structures, these works were carried out with convict labour.

The last bridge which Lennox designed and built in NSW was over the Parramatta River in Church Street, Parramatta. Originally designed in 1835 as an elliptical arch of 90-foot (27 m) span, it was built, after much controversy, as a simple stone arch spanning 80 feet (24 m) and having a width of 39 feet (12 m). Construction began in November 1836, using the centring from the Lansdowne Bridge, adjusted to the new span, and the work was finished in 1839; it was named Lennox Bridge by the Parramatta council in 1867.

Lennox also fashioned the Queen's Wharf, Parramatta.

Lennox was a man of many talents. He was appointed District Surveyor to the Parramatta Council in November 1843, but in October 1844 Governor Sir George Gipps appointed him to the Port Phillip District as Superintendent of Bridges, and he sailed from Sydney in November. For nine years he had charge of all roads, bridges, wharves and ferries, and acted as advisory engineer to various government departments. In this period he built fifty-three bridges, the most notable being the first Prince's Bridge over the Yarra River in Melbourne, a stone arch of 150-foot (46 m) span, and the largest bridge built by Lennox; it was completed in 1850 and lasted until replaced some thirty-five years later because of the necessity to provide for more traffic.

In November 1853 Lennox retired from the public service of Victoria at the age of 66; his salary had been raised to £300 in 1852 and £600 in 1853, and on his retirement parliament voted him a gratuity of £3000 - a belated acknowledgement of the skills which had earned him such modest remuneration during his working life. He remained in Melbourne for nearly two years, returned to New South Wales in June 1855 and finally settled at 4 Campbell Street, Parramatta, in a house of his own design. Essentially a practical man, he amused himself in a small backyard workshop in his old age.

Lennox House was built on Lennox's return to Parramatta, in association with sheds and outbuildings, that are reputed to have been used as workshops. He resided first in Macquarie Street while the house in Campbell Street was constructed.

The site originally ran between Campbell Street and the Great Western Highway to its south.

Tradition has it that Lennox built the house himself. That he designed it has been proved by comparison with Rose Vale near Little Hartley, an identical cottage he planned for his sister. Architect Morton Herman described the design as "harkening back to an earlier period" with "more of the excellence of 1830 than the decadence of 1855". Behind were numerous outbuildings, one a workshop where Lennox created objects from timber as well as stone.

The house is shown on the 1855 Street Alignment plan. The wooden columns at the front are a feature of houses built by James Houison, who is possibly the builder. It is very similar in form to another house built for the family at Little Hartley at the same time.

By the late 1850s the Main Suburban railway line had come to Parramatta Junction (now Granville) and on to Parramatta (and later beyond it to the west), the tracks running roughly parallel to Campbell Street and below (north of) Lennox House, clearly in view. Parramatta Station was developed from the late 1850s as part of the railway system originally intended to connect with country areas and ease the transport of agriculture to the city and the ports. Brickworks were established on the north side of Campbell Street by Harper in the mid 1850s and Muston a decade later, their kilns somewhat screened by trees at the edge of the road. These "excavations" as they were noted on the 1895 Parramatta Detail Series remained until the 1890s and were later replaced with tennis courts.

Lennox lived in his Campbell Street house with his younger daughter Jane, the widow of Charles William Rowling, and her children. In a definitive study of his life and career written in 1920, Henry Selkirk stated "In all that pertained to masonry, he was a master craftsman, from the quarry to the finished structure, a splendid manager of men, and one of whom those associated with him always spoke well...Essentially a practical man, he amused himself during his old age in a little workshop in his back yard, turning out specimens of his handiwork". A member of the congregation of St.Andrew's Presbyterian Church, Parramatta, from whose communicants Selkirk gained some of his insights, Lennox is reputed to have been its architect. Described as "a person of peculiarly retiring disposition" he remained active at his home until his death on 12 November 1873 at the age of 85.

Lennox was buried in old St John's Anglican Cemetery, Parramatta; by some oversight no inscription was placed upon his gravestone so doubt exists as to the actual spot where his body lies. As a kindly taskmaster he sought mitigation of the sentences of convicts who gave good service and seldom had trouble with any of the hundreds of prisoners employed on his projects. Although retiring by temperament he showed quiet determination when his plans were opposed by others: for example, when Governor Bourke in 1835 advocated a more elaborate design for Lennox Bridge. There is no doubt that, just as his arrival in New South Wales opened a new chapter in the bridge-building history of the colony, so did his departure close it. He was a pioneer of great skill and a master craftsman whose solution to the many technical problems brought him well-deserved and lasting fame.

After Lennox's death, his daughter sold the house to another Parramatta widow, Henrietta Lyons on 27 March 1875. In 1880 when she died it was sold by her trustee, George Moore Rouse, to Jonathan Laurie Hassall on 9 March 1881. Initially Hassall lived there with his family but later rented the property to various tenants. In 1885 council rate books list that the property was owned by Hassall and occupied by a C. C. Lamb but from c. 1898 to 1903 surveyor Edwin I. Brown lived there.

The site was presumably subdivided between 1881 and 1895 by the Hassall family.

The two surviving trustees of Hassall's estate, Sydney architect Ernest Essington Hassall and Charles Jonathan Hassall, a bank clerk of Maitland, sold the property on 16 September 1903 for 425 pounds to George Edward Morris, of Parramatta, a drill instructor to the newly created Australian Military Forces. This was very low compared with the 1100 pounds paid by Hassall twenty years earlier, the difference possibly reflecting subdivision of the original larger grant in the interim, with Morris buying a smaller allotment. Property values rose in the area near the new Parramatta railway station, which increase combined with the late 19th century boom to motivate many subdivisions. Although these inflated prices evaporated during the 1890s depression, the fall indicated here seems too great to blame on the depression alone.

The Parramatta Detail Series of 1895 shows a large gentleman's residence "Abbotsleigh" on the south-eastern corner of Marsden and Campbell Street intersection immediately to the west of Lennox House. Over the road the brickwork sites are unidentified excavations. On the property to the east, routinely identified as the remainder of William Goodwin's land, is a large empty allotment. Lennox's house is credited on this plan with only one outbuilding but the boundaries and allotment size are very similar to the current ones, indicating that any subdivision occurred before 1895.

By 1905 the property is listed as part of the G. A. Morris estate. Morris lived in the house until his death on 9 August 1914 and his widow continued to live there until a month before its sale on 27 September 1917 to John McAuslan Ritchie, gentleman and elder of St. Andrew's Presbyterian Church, for 825 pounds. Shortly before the sale the property was surveyed, despite two versions of the boundaries/dimensions of the property, the owner declared that the fences had been in their current position for the past 14 years and they were left undisturbed. Eliza Jane Morris continued her interest in the property, carrying 625 pounds of the purchase price in a mortgage due on 22 September 1922 but Ritchie paid it out two years earlier.

The 1917 plan shows the cottage as it was when Ritchie bought it. It was very close to both side boundaries with five outbuildings, one of brick with its own verandah being hard against the eastern fence, the weatherboard building next door almost colliding with it from the other side. The surveyor noted the overhanging eaves and described the cottage as "an old brick house with an iron roof, with a long wing, part brick and part wood, extruding to the rear". Three years later Henry Selkirk reported to the Royal Australian Historical Society that "the old cottage", which was occupied by John Ritchie, remained "in good preservation".

In 1937 John McAuslan Ritchie applied to have the property put under the Real Property Act. Because the surrounding properties were still under Old System Titles and the boundaries of his property had been disputed, he regularised the situation with a new Deposited Plan. Uncharacteristically this comprised only one lot. He declared its improved capital value on 15 August 1938 to be 900 pounds.

Ritchie sold the house on 21 December 1939 to Laura Dorothy Eileen Keeble, wife of sales manager George Keeble of Parramatta. It was mortgaged between 1954 and 1964. Laura continued to occupy the house until the mid-1990s, and, though no longer living there, in 1997 she remained the registered owner. In the early 1990s, due largely to the research and interest of Shylie Brown and the Parramatta Branch of the National Trust of Australia (NSW), Lennox's house was made subject to a Permanent Conservation Order. The Commission of Inquiry in 1993, resulting from an objection to the making of that order, was the last occasion that any outsiders were permitted to inspect the property. Visitors from the previous decade recall that the ground floor was still in good condition with its very early, possibly original, wallpapers and friezes still extant. In the drawing room was a built-in Georgian style cabinet said to have been made by Lennox himself. The workshop seemed much as Lennox had left it.

Mrs Keeble died in 2001.

== Description ==
Lennox House is a large stuccoed mid-Victorian brick house of one storey with a three-roomed attic and enclosed verandahs at the front and back. The house has a corrugated iron hipped roof with stuccoed chimneys, surmounted by terracotta pots. An attic window is clad and roofed in corrugated iron. Spindly fretted barge board to gable end. It contains original internal fixtures and fabric such as the wallpapers, some of which have been improved by the previous owner Mrs Keeble.

The date of the workshop on the eastern boundary of the site is likely to be just a few years later (than 1854–5).

The house is situated on 33.25 purches of land. At the rear is a series of outbuildings and a garage in very poor structural condition.

The site today stands between a number of high rise residential unit buildings and addresses (opposite) a major vehicular access route to a car parking facility serving the large Westfields Shopping Town complex (north of Campbell Street).

The topography of the site is generally level with the driveway ramping down to Campbell Street. This arrangement, including the sandstone kerb, is original - as seen in a c.1900 photograph.

In 1997, it was reported that the external condition of the facade and side elevations appeared to be extremely poor and unsound through neglect. The state of the internal spaces of the house, as observed in 1983, was reportedly in a similar, dilapidated condition.

=== Modifications and dates ===
1881-95: The site originally ran between Campbell Street and the Great Western Highway to its south and was presumably subdivided between 1881 and 1895 by the Hassell family.

A c. 1900 photograph shows open verandah to Campbell Street with a timber valance and double timber columns along the verandah, with timber louvre screen closing off the western end to the driveway. Also shown in this photograph are a brick-based low timber picket fence running along the Campbell Street frontage of the property and a small garden area before the house.

1917 plan shows the cottage very close to both side boundaries with five outbuildings, one of brick with its own verandah being hard against the eastern fence, the weatherboard building next door almost colliding with it from the other side. The surveyor noted the overhanging eaves and described the cottage as "an old brick house with an iron roof, with a long wing, part brick and part wood, extruding to the rear".

At some date the verandahs have been enclosed.

The rear of the house was modernised in the 1940s.

== Heritage listing ==
The house is significant for its association with engineer David Lennox, Lennox having built and occupied the property.

The house is historically and aesthetically significant and is representative.

Lennox House was listed on the New South Wales State Heritage Register on 2 April 1999.
