= Bernie Banton Foundation =

Former Australian nonprofit

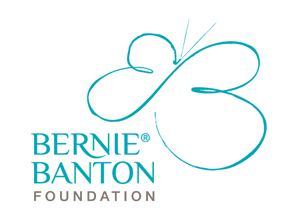
- Formation: 19 June 2009
- Type: Not-for-profit organisation
- Legal status: Voluntarily wound up as of 30 June 2020
- Purpose: Asbestos awareness and education, support and patient advocacy on behalf of asbestos related disease sufferers, their carers and loved ones
- Location: Australia
- Official language: English
- Key people: Karen Banton - CEO and Rod Smith - Awareness & Support Co-ordinator
- Website: http://www.berniebanton.com.au/bernie-banton-foundation/

The Bernie Banton Foundation was an Australian not-for-profit organisation founded in June 2009 by its CEO, Karen Banton, the widow of Bernie Banton AM. It was an Australian national (New South Wales based and registered) mesothelioma cancer, and other asbestos related diseases victim support and patient related advocacy organisation, offering and providing support in all Australian states and territories.

The Foundation was established to uphold what Bernie Banton believed in; to assist people to navigate the difficult journey an asbestos related disease diagnosis presents; to enable people to have informed choice about specialist asbestos dust litigators, medical professionals and care providers; to prevent people being exposed to asbestos dust/fibres by creating awareness of mesothelioma asbestos cancer and other asbestos related diseases; and to advocate for, and to be: ‘The voice of reason for Australian asbestos related disease sufferers, their carers and loved ones, allied health and care providers, and to the wider community.’ The Foundation was launched by the Prime Minister, The Hon Kevin Rudd, on September 9, 2009, at the Bernie Banton Centre located at Sydney's Concord Hospital.

A decision to wind up the Bernie Banton Foundation and finish operating COB 30 June 2020 was announced via a media release on 28 January 2020, attracting extensive media coverage. Winding up the Foundation was not a decision that was taken lightly, and was reached after two years of work on succession planning by Karen Banton, Rod Smith and the Bernie Banton Foundation Board.

== Foundation's Namesake ==
The foundation was named after Bernard Douglas (Bernie) Banton AM, an Australian social justice campaigner. Bernie rose to national prominence through being the face of the legal and political campaign to secure compensation for the many victims of asbestos-related conditions, which they contracted after either working for the company James Hardie or being exposed to James Hardie Industries' products.

Bernie himself suffered from asbestosis, Asbestos Related Pleural Disease (ARPD) and then finally peritoneal mesothelioma. These conditions required him to carry an oxygen tank wherever he went. Both the 2009 book Killer Company by Matt Peacock and the 2012 docu-drama mini-series, Devil's Dust screened by the Australian Broadcasting Corporation portray Banton's fight against James Hardie.

== See also ==
- Killer Company
- Devil's Dust
