= Matt Peacock =

Australian journalist and author (1952–2024)

Matt Peacock AM
- Born: Matthew James Peacock; 12 July 1952
- Died: 30 October 2024 (aged 72); Sydney, New South Wales, Australia
- Occupations: Television and radio journalist; correspondent; author
- Years active: 1973–2024
- Employer: ABC Australia
- Notable work: Killer Company

Matthew James Peacock AM (12 July 1952 – 30 October 2024) was an Australian television and radio journalist, correspondent and author who worked for the Australian Broadcasting Corporation in their News and Current Affairs Department specialising in politics, environment and science. He later also served as a director on the ABC Board. He authored Killer Company, a critically lauded 2009 book on the asbestos industry during that time.

== Career ==
Born on 12 July 1952, Peacock began his career with the ABC in 1973 as a trainee cadet with the TV current affairs program This Day Tonight. In 1979, he wrote a prize-winning radio program on the New South Wales town of Baryulgil, where the health of the local Aboriginal population had been affected by the local asbestos-manufacturing industry. Peacock became the chief political correspondent for current affairs radio in Canberra, and worked as a foreign correspondent in the United States in the early 1990s (in Washington, D.C., from 1990 to 1992 and New York City in 1993), and in London from 2001 to 2003. Over the course of his career, he "played a pivotal role in uncovering the corruption and spin of the asbestos industry over three decades, and his story was told in the mini series Devil's Dust which screened on ABC TV in 2012".

In 2013, Peacock became the first staff-elected director of ABC following reinstatement of that position by the new Australian government. As a board member, he participated in deciding where $254 million should be cut from ABC's budget; in 2014, he learned that he was facing termination as a redundant employee, under the same budget cuts. In 2015, after ABC News faced criticism for allowing Zaky Mallah to ask a question on the ABC program Q&A, Peacock wrote an email urging ABC News staff to "maintain our statutory commitment to fearless, impartial and independent coverage", while asking "my colleagues at News Corporation to resist pressure to mount unfair and provocative attacks on their fellow journalists".

Peacock also worked on ABC Radio programs AM, PM and The World Today, and for the television current affairs program 7.30, and was also an adjunct professor of journalism at the University of Technology Sydney.

=== Killer Company and Devil's Dust ===
Beginning in 1977, Peacock engaged in a lengthy investigation of the use of harmful asbestos fibre in building materials produced by James Hardie Industries, culminating in his 2009 book, Killer Company: James Hardie Exposed. In the book, Peacock documents how Hardie's practices "led to the deaths of thousands of workers and customers, who were never informed of the dangers", resulting in medical abnormalities, such as asbestosis. According to Peacock, James Hardie Industries circumvented the rules and regulations designed to protect the community from serious health hazards. Peacock states that "Hardie embarked on a cold, calculated strategy to maximise profits, minimise compensation and conceal the culprits".

Killer Company was a finalist for the Walkley non-fiction book of the year in 2009. In 2012, Devil's Dust, a docudrama based on Killer Company, was released, with Ewen Leslie portraying Peacock.

== Death ==
Peacock died from pancreatic cancer at the Royal North Shore Hospital in Sydney, on 30 October 2024, at the age of 72.

In the 2025 King's Birthday Honours, Peacock was posthumously appointed a Member of the Order of Australia, for significant service to the broadcast media as a journalist.

== Bibliography ==
- Asbestos: Work as a Health Hazard (1978) (ISBN 978-0642975317)
- The Forgotten People — a History of Australia's South Sea Islanders (1979) (ISBN 0642972605)
- Killer Company (2009) (ISBN 978-0733325809)
