= Lennox Bridge =

Lennox Bridge may refer to:

- Lennox Bridge, Glenbrook, New South Wales, Australia
- Lennox Bridge, Parramatta, New South Wales, Australia
