= Baryulgil, New South Wales =

Baryulgil
- Suburb
- Coordinates: 29°13′S 152°35′E
- Country: Australia
- State: New South Wales
- LGA: Clarence Valley Council
- Location: 695 km (432 mi) NE of Sydney; 256 km (159 mi) S of Brisbane; 76 km (47 mi) NW of Grafton

Government
  - State electorate: Clarence
  - Federal division: Page, Cowper
- Elevation: 666 m (2,185 ft)

Population
  - Total: 90 (2016 census)
- Postcode: 2460
- County: Drake

Baryulgil is a rural locality in north-eastern New South Wales, Australia. The locality is on the Clarence River in the Clarence Valley Council local government area.

It is on the lands of the Bundjalung (Wehlabul) people, who are its traditional owners.

== History ==
According to the Geographical Names Board, the name is derived from an Aboriginal language, meaning a certain species of large lizard, although it is also "apparently a corruption of 'Yulgilbar' the name of Edwards Ogelvie's run". (Note: A number of other sources spell the name Edward Ogilvie.)

Baryulgil Post Office opened on 1 January 1896 and closed in 1991.

=== Asbestos mining ===
Historically, other than agriculture, asbestos mining had been the most important industry in the Baryulgil area, with the Baryulgil asbestos mine operating from 1953 to 1979. It has since shown that the mine and its related operations, as well as its remains, have had a major adverse impact on the health of the inhabitants, in particular the Aboriginal community.

The impacts of asbestos on health to the Baryulgil community were documented by Australian Broadcasting Corporation journalist Matt Peacock in his book Killer Company and telemovie Devil's Dust.

== Location and facilities ==
The village of Baryulgil, sometimes locally referred to as "The Square", is situated on The Clarence Way, a scenic road between Tabulam and Copmanhurst. The village is situated a short distance from the Clarence River.

Baryulgil is in Yulgilbar parish of Drake County, and within the Clarence Valley Council local government area.

The village has a small public primary and infants school that serves the local area.

== Notable people ==
Baryulgil is the birthplace of Australian cricketer Jack Marsh and former boxer Tony Mundine.
