= Bernie Banton Bridge =

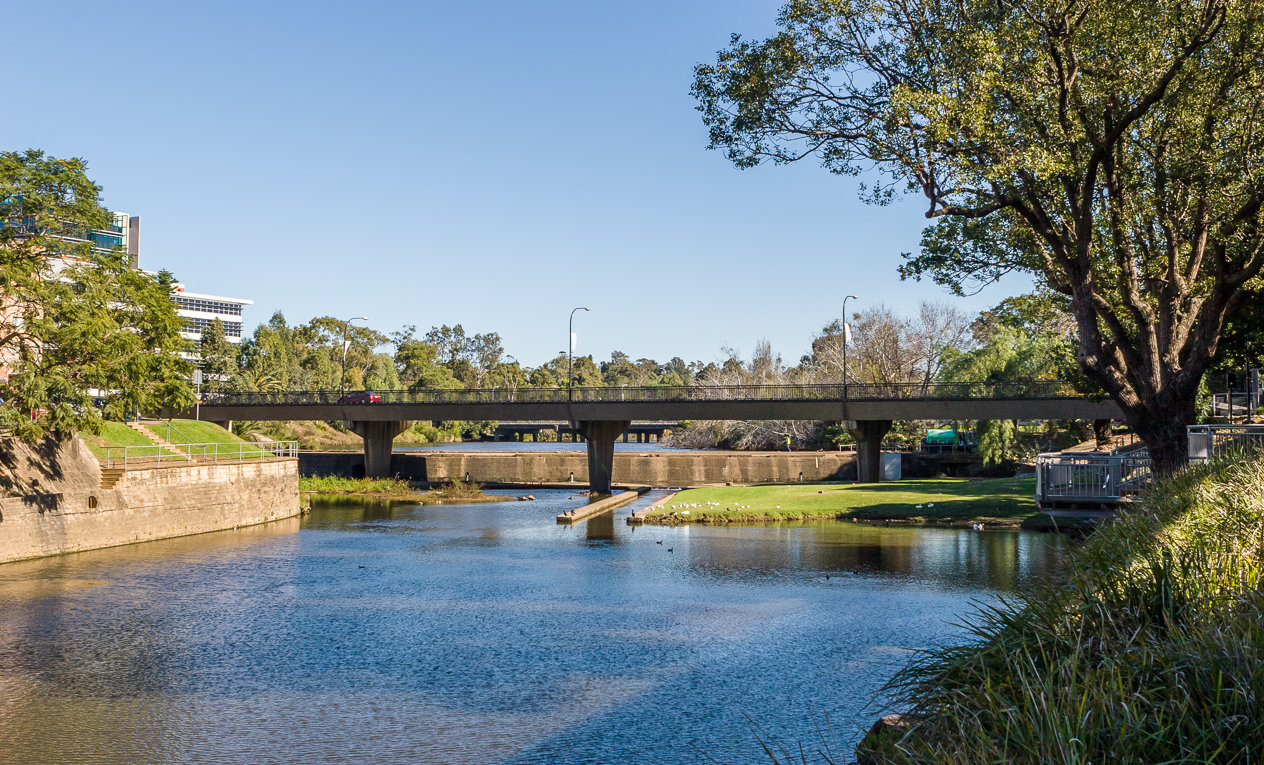
- Coordinates: 33°48′39″S 151°00′11″E
- Carries: Marsden Street: Motor vehicles; Pedestrians
- Crosses: Parramatta River
- Locale: Parramatta, New South Wales, Australia
- Named for: Bernie Banton
- Maintained by: Parramatta City Council
- Preceded by: Rings Bridge
- Followed by: Lennox Bridge

Characteristics
- Design: Girder bridge
- Material: Concrete
- No. of lanes: Two

History
- Opened: 1971

Location
- Interactive map of Bernie Banton Bridge

The Bernie Banton Bridge is a multi-span concrete girder bridge located in Parramatta, New South Wales, Australia. Built in 1971, the bridge carries two lanes of vehicular traffic with two pedestrian sidewalks. The bridge was built to replace the often flooded Marsden Street Weir and was originally called the Marsden Street Bridge. The bridge was renamed in 2006 in honour of the asbestos diseases campaigner, Bernie Banton.

== Description ==
The Bernie Banton Bridge crosses the Parramatta River and is an important north and south transport link between Parramatta's CBD and North Parramatta. On the North Parramatta side of the river, the bridge provides access to residential areas as well as Western Sydney Stadium (now Commbank Stadium), Parramatta Leagues Club, Old King's Parade Ground, St Patrick's Cathedral and Our Lady of Mercy College. Meanwhile, on the south bank of the Parramatta River, the bridge provides access to Parramatta Park (including Old Government House), Parramatta Children's Court, the Family Court of Australia, Parramatta RSL Club as well as the offices of the Department of Home Affairs, Australian Taxation Office and Centrelink.

Downriver, the historic Lennox Bridge is visible from the Bernie Banton Bridge. Also visible is the Marsden Street Weir. The weir was used as a river crossing until the 1970s when the adjacent and better aligned Marsden Street bridge was constructed. As a weir and roadway it frequently closed in wet weather as the water overtopped the structure."

== See also ==
- List of bridges in Sydney
