= Australian Blue Asbestos =

Australian Blue Asbestos Pty. Ltd. (ABA) was a company founded by Lang Hancock, operated between the years (1938–1966) responsible for the mining, bagging and distribution of blue asbestos or crocidolite, in Wittenoom, in northern Western Australia. The operation, purchased in 1943 by CSR Limited, was operated as a subsidiary until its closure in 1966. Due to litigation brought about by workers about the effects of inhalation of airborne fibres of blue asbestos, the company was forced to close. It was alleged that ABA was negligent in its behaviour in that, with respect to the workers, families and residents of Wittenoom, the company willingly knew that conditions were well below standard and that dust levels exceeded accepted levels of the day.

== Asbestos ==
Blue asbestos is possibly 100 times more hazardous than white asbestos, as the fibres are much smaller (around 2.5 to 10 micrometres). The inhalation of asbestos results in illness and in most cases death, due to asbestosis, mesothelioma (of which asbestos is the only known cause) and other lung diseases. This aetiology was described, reported and explained to the management of ABA as well as being the subject of many medical journal articles.

The asbestos fibre count at the mine and other facilities was regularly measured at 1000 parts per cm^{3} or more. This is in stark contrast to the health department guidelines of the 1950s that required less than 176 parts per cm^{3}. By 1967 the 'safe' level of asbestos was limited to 5 parts per cm^{3}.

== Litigation ==
By 1988 a Supreme Court jury found that CSR had been "recklessly indifferent" to the safety of its workers and that ABA knowingly allowed the processing of asbestos to continue even though the dangers of asbestos fibre inhalation were known as early as 1926. One litigant, Klaus Rabenault, was awarded $426,000 in damages and CSR was fined $250,000 for its criminal behaviour. A year later, Klaus died of mesothelioma.

The company was purchased from CSR Limited by James Hardie Industries Ltd and has now moved to the Netherlands in an apparent attempt to divorce itself from the asbestos crisis. Worker's compensation claims for previous workers, wives and offspring of residents of Wittenoom continue to be a big issue for company, which has not moved any further on the compensation case. The present number of known victims is around 2000. Since 1995, a disturbing trend has surfaced: many new cases of wives and children of workers from Wittenoom have been diagnosed with mesothelioma, possibly from washing dust-laden clothes of mine workers, while the children who used to play in the mine tailings that were spread over the streets at Wittenoom, have also been affected.

The company was also subjected to court actions by the Australian Securities and Investments Commission (ASIC) and the Australian Tax Office (ATO) over its corporate tactics and activities.

=== Latest information ===
On 12 December 2008, James Hardie published a quarterly report stating that "James Hardie and the Australian Taxation Office (ATO) have reached an agreement which finalises tax audits being conducted by the ATO on the company’s Australian income tax returns for the years ended 31 March 2002 and 31 March 2004 through 31 March 2006 and settles all outstanding issues arising from these tax audits".

On the 7th of February 2007 Hardie Industries had agreed to a compensation payout. On 20 November 2007 one victim, Bernie Banton, received a second compensation payout, though his health had declined to almost total incapacitation. He died on 27 November 2007.

Company disregard for asbestos miners' health and lack of compensation was commented on in the song Blue Sky Mine on the album Blue Sky Mining by Midnight Oil.
