= Lansdowne, New South Wales =

Lansdowne
- Suburb
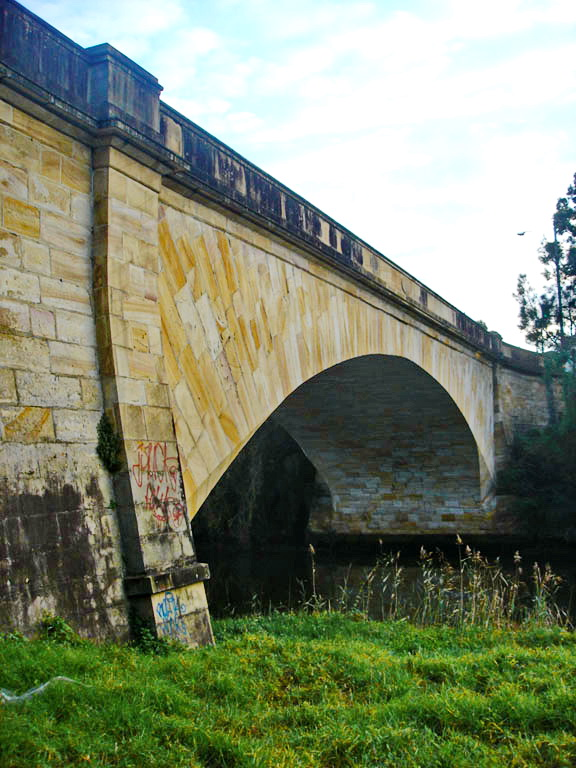
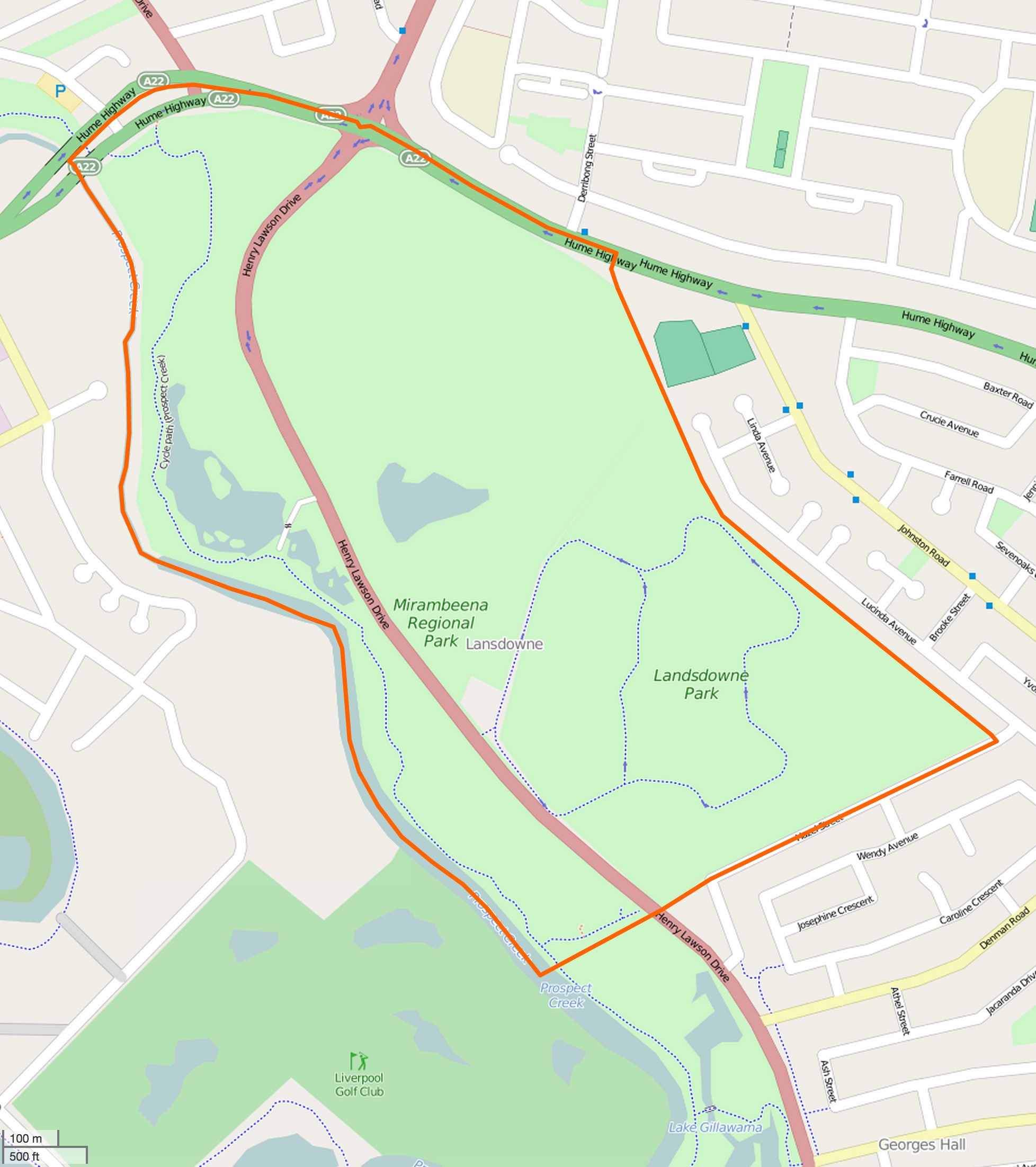
- Lansdowne Bridge over Prospect Creek on the Hume Highway Boundaries of Lansdowne

- Interactive map of Lansdowne
- Coordinates: 33°53′42″S 150°58′27″E
- Country: Australia
- State: New South Wales
- City: Sydney
- LGA: City of Canterbury-Bankstown
- Location: 27 km (17 mi) west of Sydney CBD

Government
  - State electorate: Bankstown
  - Federal division: Watson
- Elevation: 11 m (36 ft)

Population
  - Total: 16 (2021 census)
- Postcode: 2163
Suburbs around Lansdowne
Canley Vale	Carramar	Villawood
Lansvale	Lansdowne	Bass Hill
Lansvale	Georges Hall	Georges Hall

Lansdowne is a suburb in south-western Sydney, in the state of New South Wales, Australia. Lansdowne is located 27 kilometres west of the Sydney central business district, in the local government area of the City of Canterbury-Bankstown and is part of the South-western Sydney region. Its western boundary is Prospect Creek, the north the Hume Highway and the east and south Georges Hall.

== History ==
The suburb's name has occasionally in the past appeared on maps with a spelling of 'Landsdowne'.

The area now designated as the suburb of Lansdowne was subdivided into residential lots in the 1880s and the roads formed but not sealed, but very few houses were built. The Metropolitan Water Sewerage and Drainage Board subsequently acquired the land and it remained unused, with its network of unused streets sitting in a landscape of grassland and stands of trees.

Because the area designated as the suburb of Lansdowne is largely the undeveloped land previously owned by the Metropolitan Water Sewerage and Drainage Board, it consists almost entirely of parkland.

In the 1940s Henry Lawson Drive, intended as a scenic route, was built through Lansdowne from the Hume Highway at Woodville Road to Milperra Road at Milperra Bridge.

In December 1960 to January 1961 the sixth Australian Scout Jamboree was held on the site, and in September 1970 a Scout "jamborette" was held on the land as part of the celebrations of the 75th anniversary of the proclamation of Bankstown Municipality.

In 1974, the Commonwealth Department of Urban and Regional Development acquired for regional open space the land owned by the metropolitan Water Sewerage and Drainage Board, and transferred ownership to Bankstown Council. This is the area now occupied by Mirrmabeena Regional Park. In the following years the park was landscaped and equipped for recreational use. This included the creation of Lake Gillawarna, and other ponds full of aquatic life, native walks and pedestrian/cycle ways, playgrounds and barbecue and picnic facilities.

== Transport ==
Lansdowne took its name from the Lansdowne Bridge, named after Henry Petty-Fitzmaurice, 3rd Marquess of Lansdowne. Lansdowne Bridge was built in 1834–35 to replace a hardwood bridge called Bowler's Bridge leading to Bowler's Inn. The bridge is regarded as one of the finest works by stonemason David Lennox, who was made Superintendent of Bridges in 1833 and was tasked with replacing unsafe hardwood bridges that were frequently swept away in floods.

Since 1958, with the construction immediately downstream of a second bridge over Prospect Creek, Lansdowne Bridge has carried only northbound traffic of the Hume Highway.

The Meccano Set is a well-known landmark, consisting of an overhead tubular steel framework holding traffic lights and road signage, straddling the intersection of the Hume Highway, Henry Lawson Drive and Woodville Road. The original structure was installed in 1962, and a near-identical replacement structure was installed in 2019.

== Parks ==
Lansdowne consists nearly entirely of parkland, made up of:

- Mirambeena Regional Park
- Lansdowne Park, which is a road cycling circuit.
