= Jewboy =

- Movie poster
- Directed by: Tony Krawitz
- Written by: Tony Krawitz
- Produced by: Liz Watts; Libby Sharpe
- Starring: Ewen Leslie; Saskia Burmeister
- Cinematography: Greig Fraser
- Edited by: Jane Moran
- Release date: 19 February 2005
- Running time: 52 minutes
- Country: Australia
- Language: English

Jewboy is a 2005 Australian drama film written and directed by Tony Krawitz. The film stars Ewen Leslie, Chris Haywood, Saskia Burmeister, and Nicholas Eadie. It won the 2005 Australian Film Institute Awards for Best Short Fiction Film, Best Cinematography and Best Screenplay in a Short.

== Plot ==
The film tells of a young Orthodox Jewish man's struggle after the death of his father. The young man returns from Israel to find that he would prefer to leave Orthodoxy, and departs from his remaining family to become a taxi driver. He gradually assimilates into secular life, soon finding himself tempted to fornicate.

The film appears to mimic the Parable of the Prodigal Son, with the main character appearing to reconsider Orthodox life at the end of the film by reuniting with his family.

== Release ==
The film showed in the Un Certain Regard at the 2005 Cannes Film Festival, as well as in official selection in the 2006 Sundance Film Festival. After the presentation, Tony Krawitz, the Jewish director, and Ewen Leslie (who is not Jewish) responded to various questions, claiming that the title was not meant to be offensive, and the film had been prescreened by a Jewish audience to positive reviews.

== Cast ==
- Ewen Leslie – Yuri
- Naomi Wilson – Minnie
- Saskia Burmeister – Rivka
- Leah Vandenberg – Sarita
- Nicholas Eadie – Isaac
- Chris Haywood – Sam
- Nathan Besser – Alon
- Alice McConnell – Cheryl
- Nicholas Calafato – Jew Boy
- Kelly Butler – Woman in Taxi
- Alan Flower – STA Passenger
- Richard Green – Gary
- Jake Stone – Yossi
- Sky Tse – Chinese Man
- Adam Rosenberg – Dovid
- Shivani Dewan – Nina

== Box office ==
Jewboy grossed $19,118 at the box office in Australia.

== See also ==
- Cinema of Australia
