= Bernie Banton =

Australian activist (1946–2007)

Bernie Banton AM
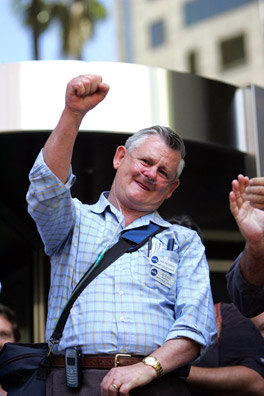
- Born: Bernard Douglas Banton; 13 October 1946; Parramatta, New South Wales, Australia
- Died: 27 November 2007 (aged 61); West Pennant Hills, New South Wales, Australia
- Occupations: Builder; Social justice campaigner
- Years active: 1966–2007
- Known for: Advocate for victims of Asbestos-related diseases
- Spouse: Karen Banton
- Awards: Member of the Order of Australia; 2007 NSW Senior Australian of the Year

Bernard Douglas Banton AM (13 October 1946 – 27 November 2007) was an Australian builder and, later, social justice campaigner for asbestos-related diseases. He was the widely recognised face of the legal and political campaign to achieve compensation for the many sufferers of asbestos-related conditions, which they contracted after either working for the company James Hardie or being exposed to James Hardie Industries' products.

Banton himself suffered from multiple forms of asbestos-related diseases, being diagnosed with asbestosis and also asbestos-related pleural disease (ARPD) in January 1999 after having worked at James Hardie Industries, decades earlier, making asbestos lagging. These conditions required him to carry an oxygen tank wherever he went.

On the 17 August 2007, Banton was also diagnosed with terminal peritoneal mesothelioma, a cancer of the lining of the abdomen most commonly associated with asbestos exposure, dying 103 days later. The 2009 book Killer Company details Banton's fight against James Hardie.

Banton brought an action against Amaca Pty Ltd before the Dust Diseases Tribunal of New South Wales.

== Other campaigning ==
Banton's final campaign public appearance was In October 2007, during the midst of the 2007 federal election campaign. Banton attempted to personally present Minister for Health Tony Abbott, [later the 28th Prime Minister of Australia] with a petition to include a drug for treating malignant mesothelioma on the Pharmaceutical Benefits Scheme. When Minister Abbott was not in attendance at his Manly (Sydney), NSW electoral office, Banton called him "a gutless creep". Responding, Minister Abbott, who had been in Victoria at the time, was quoted as saying, "Let's be upfront about this. I know Bernie is very sick, but just because a person is sick doesn't necessarily mean that he is pure of heart in all things." He then dismissed the presenting of the petition (at his office) as a "stunt", as he was not aware that Banton had planned to present the petition at his Sydney office until it was too late. Minister Abbott apologised personally to Banton the following morning with Banton offering his own apology in return.

In his victory speech on 24 November after winning the election, the Prime Minister-elect Kevin Rudd paid special tribute to Banton, saying that he represented the "great Australian trade union movement" and was a beacon of decency in his fight for compensation.

Banton died at his home on 27 November, three days after the election.

== Honours ==
In the Queen's Birthday Honours of 13 June 2005, Banton was made a Member of the Order of Australia "for service to the community, particularly as an advocate for people affected by asbestos-related illnesses".

Banton's family accepted the NSW government's offer of a state funeral, which was held on 5 December 2007. Both the Australian and the NSW state flags were lowered to half mast that day on all NSW government buildings and establishments, as a mark of respect.

On 21 January 2009, a new asbestos diseases research institute at Sydney's Concord Repatriation General Hospital was named the Bernie Banton Centre. The facility is the world's first standalone research facility dedicated to the treatment and prevention of asbestos-related diseases. The Bernie Banton Bridge, which carries Marsden Street over the Parramatta River in Parramatta also bears his name.

Banton also had a foundation named in his honour. The Bernie Banton Foundation was an Australian not-for-profit organisation devoted to asbestos awareness and education, support and patient advocacy on behalf of asbestos-related disease sufferers, their carers and loved ones. The Foundation's aim was to be: "The voice of reason for Australian asbestos related disease sufferers, their carers and loved ones, allied health and care providers, and to the wider community." The foundation was launched by the Prime Minister, The Hon Kevin Rudd, on 11 September 2009 at Sydney's Concord Repatriation General Hospital.

== See also ==
- Bernie Banton Foundation
- Devil's Dust
