= Magic Kingdom, Sydney =

Defunct amusement park in Sydney, Australia

Coordinates: 33.8991°S 150.9697°E

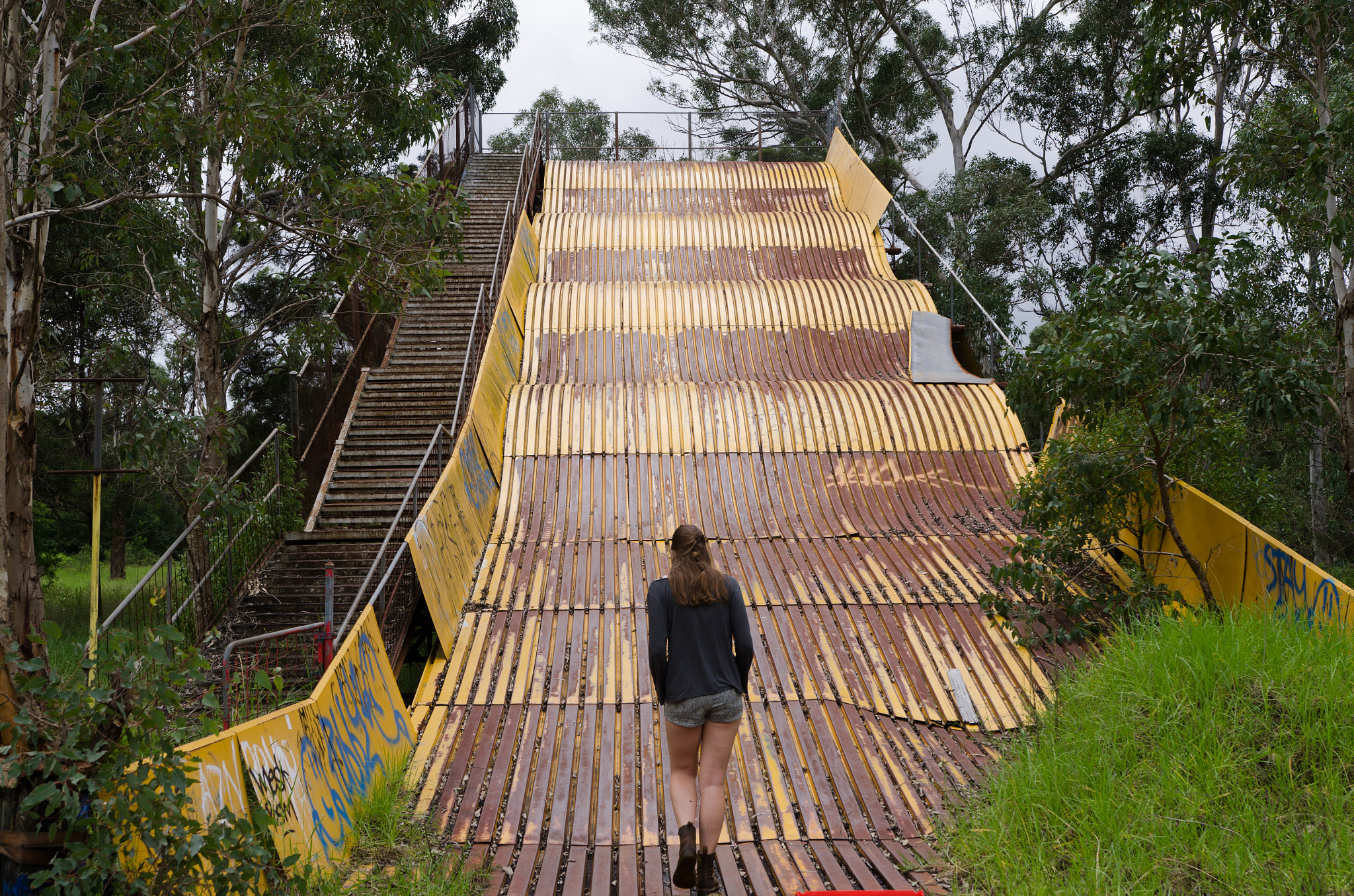
Abandoned dry slide at Magic Kingdom, Sydney, 2014.

Magic Kingdom was a small amusement park located in Lansvale, New South Wales, Australia. It is now closed.

== History ==
The park operated in the 1970s, 1980s and early 1990s. The park was closed not long after Wonderland Sydney opened.

The park was promoted on television with commercials featuring the song "Magic" by the band Pilot.

Some of the rides were sourced from Luna Park after Luna Park closed in 1979 following the Ghost Train tragedy.

Magic Kingdom was popular at its peak but due to its size and location (it could only be accessed by a road which went through an industrial area and residential area) the park struggled to remain viable.

The site was sold in 2017 however, flooding issues with the nearby Prospect Creek have limited its potential for redevelopment.

== Attractions ==
The park was small, covering about 36 acres (150,000 m^{2}). Features included:

- Over 15 rides
- Slides (Two open water slides (95 metres long) plus a giant dry slide)
- Radio-controlled cars
- Picnic area with barbecue facilities
- Big Shoe
- Petrol-powered mini-boats on a lake
- In the 1990s' bungy jumping was available at the park.
