= The Butterfly Tree =

2017 film

- Theatrical film poster
- Directed by: Priscilla Cameron
- Written by: Priscilla Cameron
- Produced by: Bridget Callow-Wright
- Starring: Melissa George; Ed Oxenbould; Ewen Leslie
- Cinematography: Jason Hargreaves
- Edited by: Rodrigo Balart
- Music by: Caitlin Yeo
- Release date: 11 August 2017 (Melbourne)
- Running time: 96 minutes
- Country: Australia
- Language: English

The Butterfly Tree is a 2017 Australian drama film directed by Priscilla Cameron. It had its premiere at the 2017 Melbourne International Film Festival, and was screened in the Discovery section at the 2017 Toronto International Film Festival.

== Plot ==
Evelyn is an ex-burlesque queen who puts a curse on single dad Al and his son Fin with her zest for life. When both Al and Fin learn they are competing for Evelyn's love, their competition brings back memories over the death of Fin's mother.

== Cast ==
- Melissa George as Evelyn
- Ewen Leslie as Al
- Ed Oxenbould as Fin
- Sophie Lowe as Shelley

== Reception ==
The Butterfly Tree received mixed reviews from critics and audiences, earning a 46% approval rating on Rotten Tomatoes, based on 13 reviews with an average score of 5.71/10.

=== Accolades ===
Award	Category	Subject	Result
AACTA Awards (7th)	Best Original Screenplay	Priscilla Cameron	Nominated
AACTA Awards (7th)	Best Actor	Ewen Leslie	Nominated
AACTA Awards (7th)	Best Original Music Score	Caitlin Yeo	Nominated
FCCA Award	Best Supporting Actor	Ed Oxenbould	Nominated
