= Starman (upcoming film) =

Upcoming film

- Directed by: Josh Wakely
- Screenplay by: Josh Wakely
- Produced by: Rebecca Graham; Eddie Vaisman; Josh Wakely
- Starring: Brendan Fraser; Jeff Daniels
- Production companies: Grace: A Storytelling Company; Sight Unseen
- Country: United States
- Language: English
- Budget: $20+ million

Starman is an upcoming American science fiction thriller film directed and written by Josh Wakely. The film stars Brendan Fraser and Jeff Daniels.

== Premise ==
The plot will follow Tom Adams, an astronaut and the co-leader of a space company, who launches an expedition to Mars.

== Cast ==
- Brendan Fraser as Tom Adams, technologist, astronaut and co-leader of a space company
- Jeff Daniels as Ed Watkins, the co-leader of a space company and Tom's friend
- Aisling Bea as Julia Hanley, a photographer and Tom's love-interest
- Ewen Leslie
- Stephen Curry

== Production ==
In May 2026, it was announced that Brendan Fraser was set to star in Starman, a science fiction film to be written and directed by Josh Wakely. In June 2026, Jeff Daniels joined the cast. In July 2026, Ewen Leslie and Stephen Curry joined the cast. In August 2026, Aisling Bea joined the cast.

Filming began by July 22, 2026 in Australia.
