= Lansvale =

- Suburb
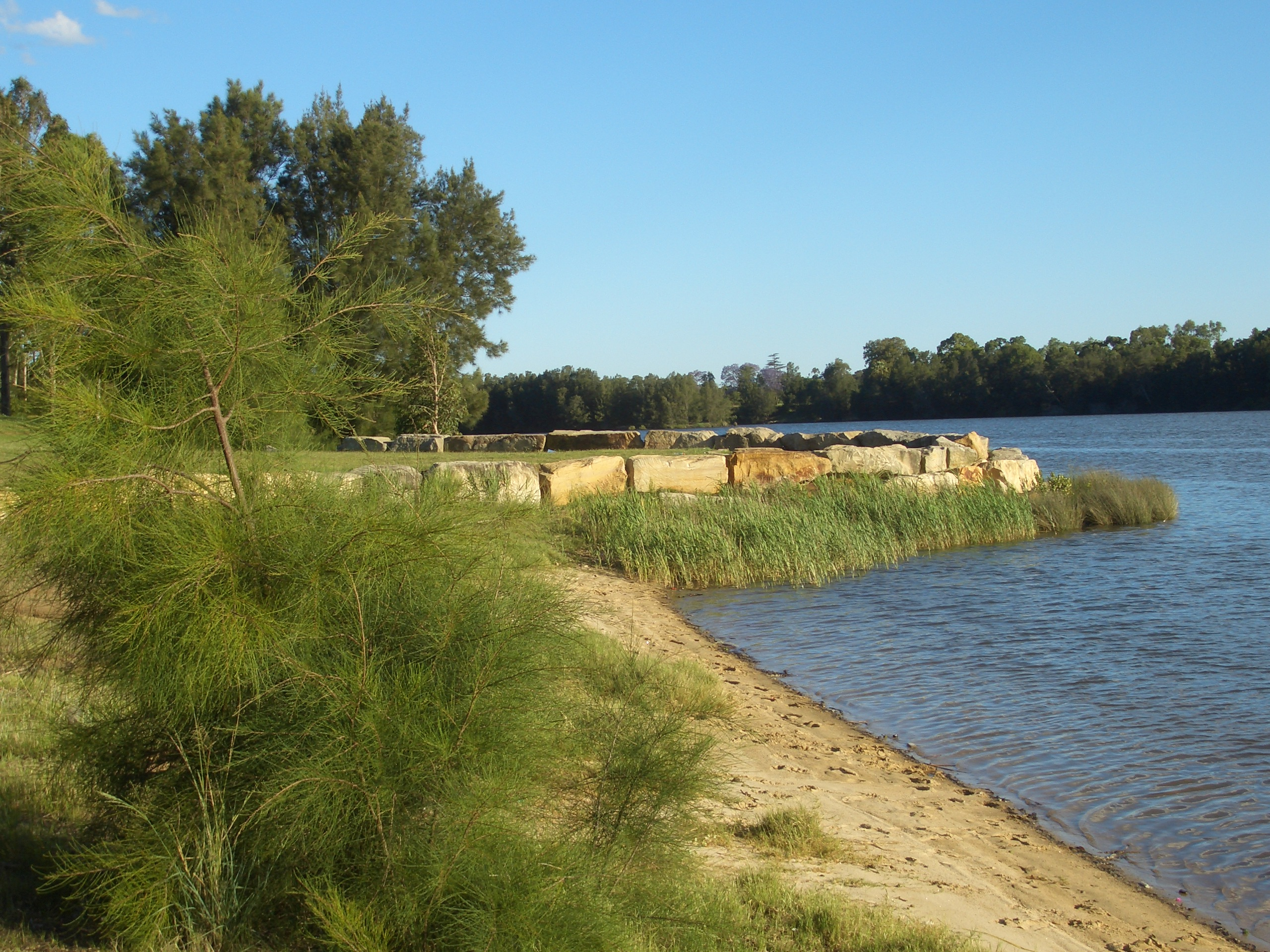
- Floyd Bay

- Interactive map of Lansvale
- Coordinates: 33°53′40″S 150°57′16″E
- Country: Australia
- State: New South Wales
- City: Sydney
- LGA: City of Fairfield
- Location: 28 km (17 mi) south-west of Sydney CBD

Government
  - State electorate: Cabramatta
  - Federal division: Blaxland

Area
  - Total: 2.9 km^{2} (1.1 sq mi)
- Elevation: 10 m (33 ft)

Population
  - Total: 2,595 (2021 census)
  - Density: 895/km^{2} (2,320/sq mi)
- Postcode: 2166
Suburbs around Lansvale
Canley Vale	Carramar	Lansdowne
Cabramatta	Lansvale	Lansdowne
Warwick Farm	Chipping Norton	Georges Hall

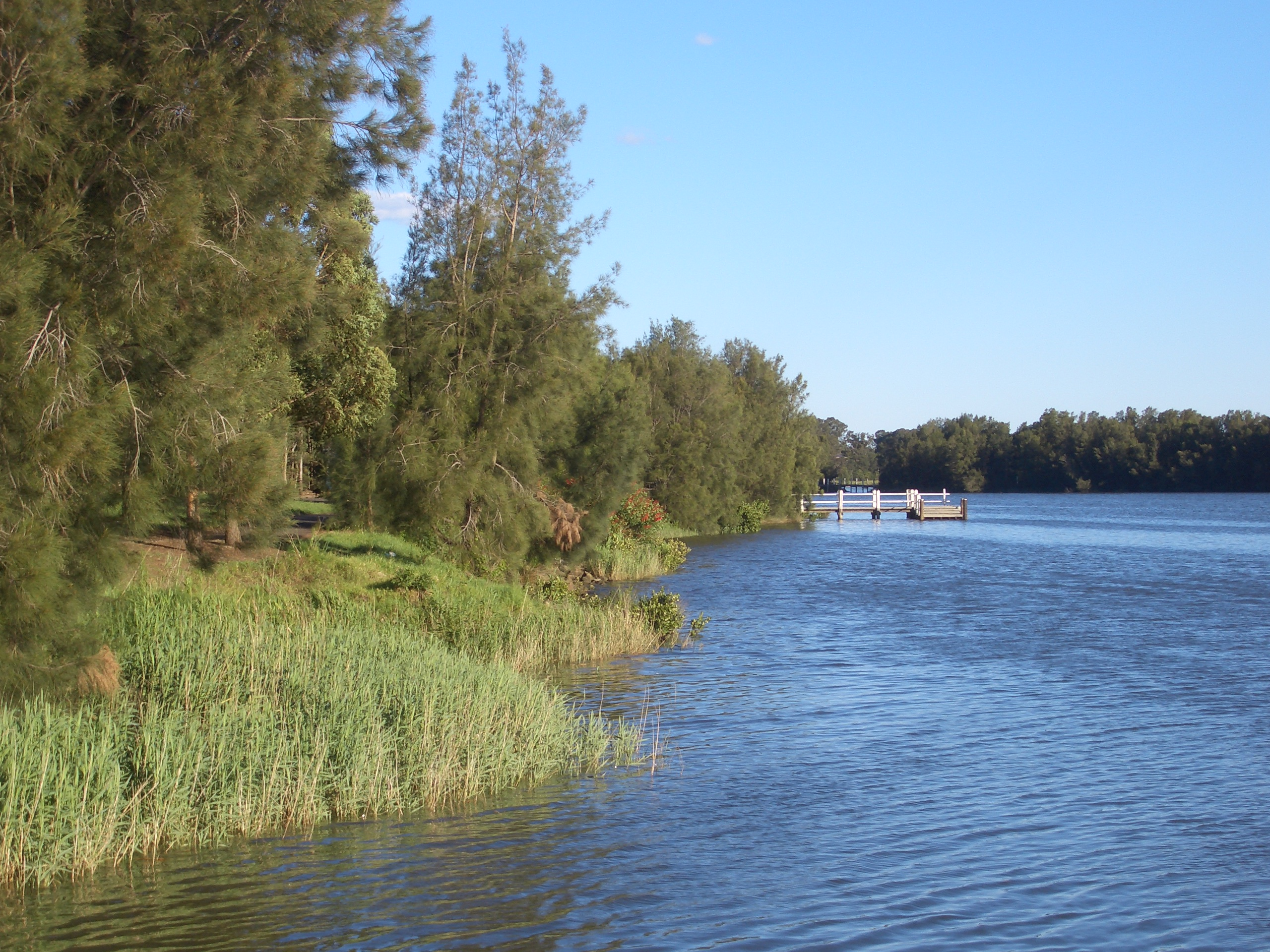
Floyd Bay

Lansvale is a suburb of Sydney, in the state of New South Wales, Australia 28 kilometres south-west of the Sydney central business district, the other side of Chipping Norton and its lake, in the local government areas of the City of Fairfield and is part of the South-western Sydney region.

== History ==
Lansvale took its name from a combination of the names of the neighbouring suburbs of Lansdowne and Canley Vale. This area was a most popular recreational site of the early twentieth century. Latty's Pleasure Grounds, the Butterfly Hall, Hollywood Park and the Lansdowne Reserve were popular ventures which fringed the river and lakes system. The amusement parks were struggling by the time of the Great Depression and eventually the land that they occupied was acquired by the council for public reserves. It is a little-known fact that the first games of Rugby League football in Australia, in early 1908, were trial games that took place in Lansvale, at Latty's Pleasure Grounds. This was before the first official competition games tookplace at venues closer to the City of Sydney, and well before professional Rugby League clubs came to the further western suburbs of Sydney, such as Parramatta, Canterbury-Bankstown and Western Suburbs.

The suburb developed in the 1950s when the peripheral areas of Bankstown municipality assumed identities of their own. One popular housing estate is known as River Heights, where stylishly designed houses with every modern detail and a luxurious finish have been built.

A local landmark is Lansdowne Bridge, a sandstone bridge built between 1834 and 1836, designed and supervised by David Lennox. The bridge is listed on the (now defunct) Register of the National Estate. Magic Kingdom was an amusement park that operated in Lansvale from the 1970s to the 1990s.

== Heritage listings ==
Lansvale has a number of heritage-listed sites, including:

- Hume Highway: Lansdowne Bridge

== Parks and recreation ==
Chipping Norton Lake and Floyd Bay are the main recreational centres of Lansvale featuring parklands, walkways, barbecues, and scenery. Highlights of these precincts include Lakeside Walk, Divine Beach, Bradbury Wharf, Eora Beach, Eastlake Point, Butterfly Point, Cunningham Beach, Rowleys Point, Shearer Park Wharf, and Hollywood Park. Cabramatta Creek flows east from the lake towards the suburb, passing Irelands Bridges Reserve, which contains small remnants of the Western Sydney Dry Rainforest.

Lansvale is also home to Oak Point Golf Club (formerly Liverpool Golf Course). Howard Street and Hollywood Drive have the greatest recorded street-tree canopy cover among named roads in Lansvale, at approximately 11,303 m² and 7,092 m², respectively.

== People ==
According to the 2021 census, Lansvale had a population of 2,595 people with a median age of 40, which was slightly higher than the national median age of 38. Just under half of these people were born in Australia (48.0%), with the other most common countries of birth being Vietnam (24.0%), Cambodia (2.4%), Lebanon (1.7%), New Zealand (1.5%) and China (1.3%). The majority of people spoke a language other than English at home (66.4%), with Vietnamese (34.1%), Arabic (6.7%), Cantonese (3.0%), Khmer (2.2%) and Mandarin (1.9%) forming the top responses for languages spoken at home. The most common responses for religion were Buddhism 22.7%, Catholic 22.1% and No Religion 21.2%.

== Housing ==
As at the 2021 census, Lansvale had a total of 771 occupied private dwellings, of which 94.7% were separate houses, 2.1% were semi-detached dwellings, 2.2% were flats or apartments and 0.6% were other dwellings. Of these occupied private dwellings, 36.6% were owned outright, 36.7% were owned with a mortgage and 23.2% were rented.

== Schools ==
Public schools in Lansvale include Lansvale Public School (actually in Canley Vale) and Lansvale East Public School.

== See also ==
- Magic Kingdom, Sydney
