= Killer Company =

2009 book by Matt Peacock

- First edition cover
- Author: Matt Peacock
- Language: English
- Subject: James Hardie Industries use of asbestos
- Genre: Non-fiction
- Publisher: ABC Books
- Publication date: 2009
- Publication place: Australia
- Media type: Print, e-book
- ISBN: 978-0733325809

Killer Company: James Hardie Exposed is a 2009 Australian book by journalist Matt Peacock.

== Overview ==
The book documents how the use of harmful asbestos fibre in building materials produced by James Hardie Industries "led to the deaths of thousands of workers and customers, who were never informed of the dangers". Working with asbestos products, such as "fibro", resulted in medical abnormalities, such as asbestosis. The book opens with the story of Bernie Banton, former James Hardie employee, who suffered from asbestos-induced fibrosis and later died.

According to Peacock, James Hardie Industries circumvented the rules and regulations designed to protect the community from serious health hazards. Peacock states that "Hardie embarked on a cold, calculated strategy to maximise profits, minimise compensation and conceal the culprits".

== Awards and legacy ==
Killer Company was a finalist for the Walkley non-fiction book of the year in 2009. Devil's Dust, a docudrama based on Killer Company, was released in 2012, with Ewen Leslie portraying Peacock.
