= Lansdowne Bridge =

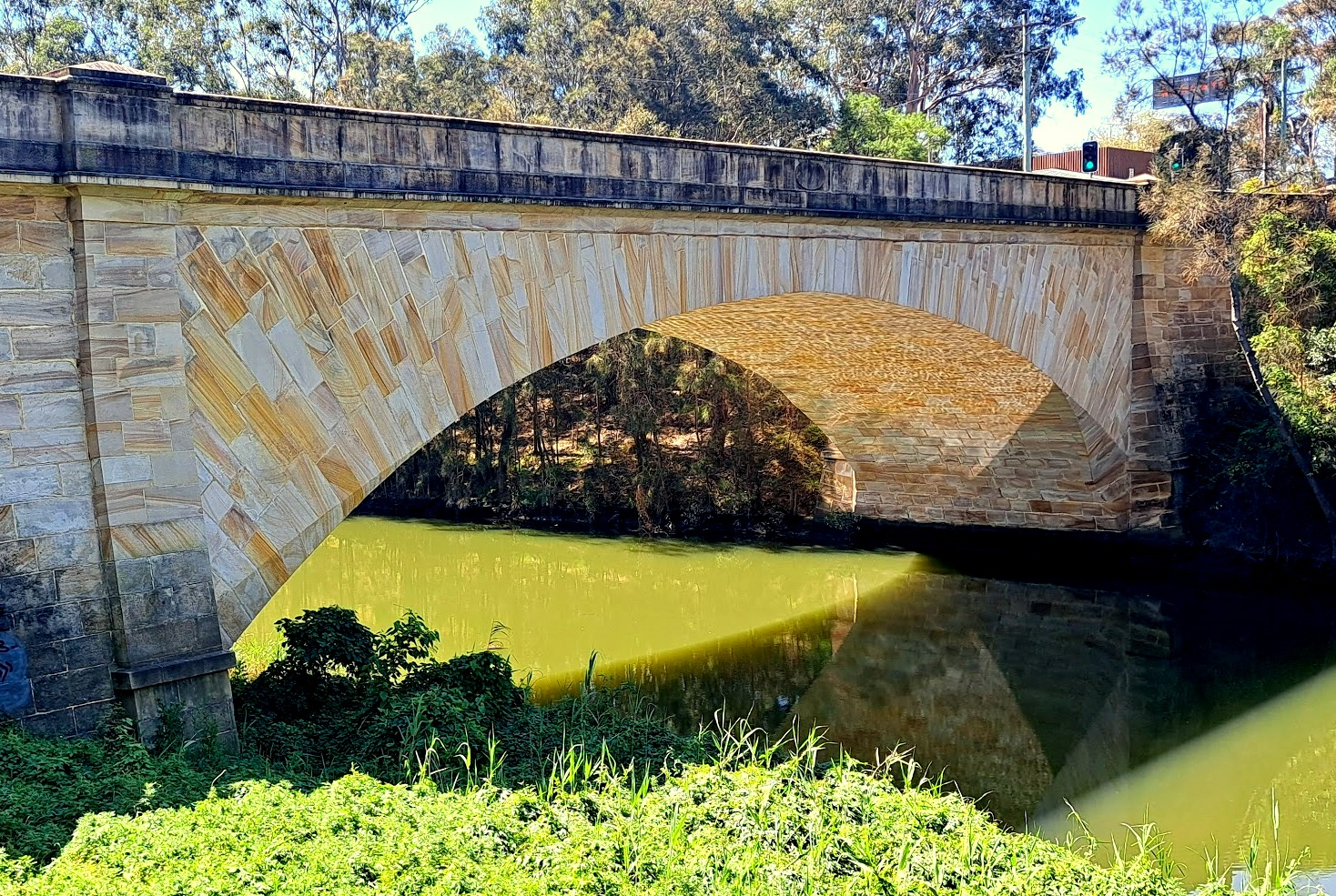
- Lansdowne Bridge carrying the Hume Highway over Prospect Creek
- Coordinates: 33°53′25″S 150°58′02″E
- Carries: Hume Highway: Motor vehicles; Pedestrians
- Crosses: Prospect Creek, New South Wales
- Other name: Lennox Bridge
- Named for: Henry Petty-Fitzmaurice, 3rd Marquess of Lansdowne

Characteristics
- Design: Arch bridge
- Material: Sydney sandstone
- Total length: 58 metres (190 ft)
- Width: 9.1 metres (30 ft)
- Longest span: 34 metres (110 ft)
- Clearance above: 9.1 metres (30 ft)

History
- Designer: David Lennox
- Construction start: 1 January 1834
- Construction end: 1836
- Opened: 26 January 1836

New South Wales Heritage Register
- Official name: Lansdowne Bridge
- Type: State heritage (built)
- Criteria: undefined
- Designated: 20 June 2000
- Reference no.: 01472
- Type: Road Bridge
- Category: Transport – Land
- Builders: David Lennox

Location
- Interactive map of Lansdowne Bridge

The Lansdowne Bridge is a heritage-listed road bridge that carries the northbound carriageway of the Hume Highway (route A22 at this point) across Prospect Creek between Lansvale and Lansdowne. Situated in southwestern Sydney, it is located on the boundary of the Fairfield and Canterbury-Bankstown local government areas. The bridge was named in honour of Henry Petty-Fitzmaurice, 3rd Marquess of Lansdowne (1780–1863), an Irish Whig politician of the British Parliament (at that time all of Ireland was under British rule and was represented in the British parliament) and associate of the NSW Governor of the day, Sir Richard Bourke.

The bridge is owned by the state of New South Wales and is managed by the agency of Transport for NSW. It was added to the New South Wales State Heritage Register on 20 June 2000.

== Description ==
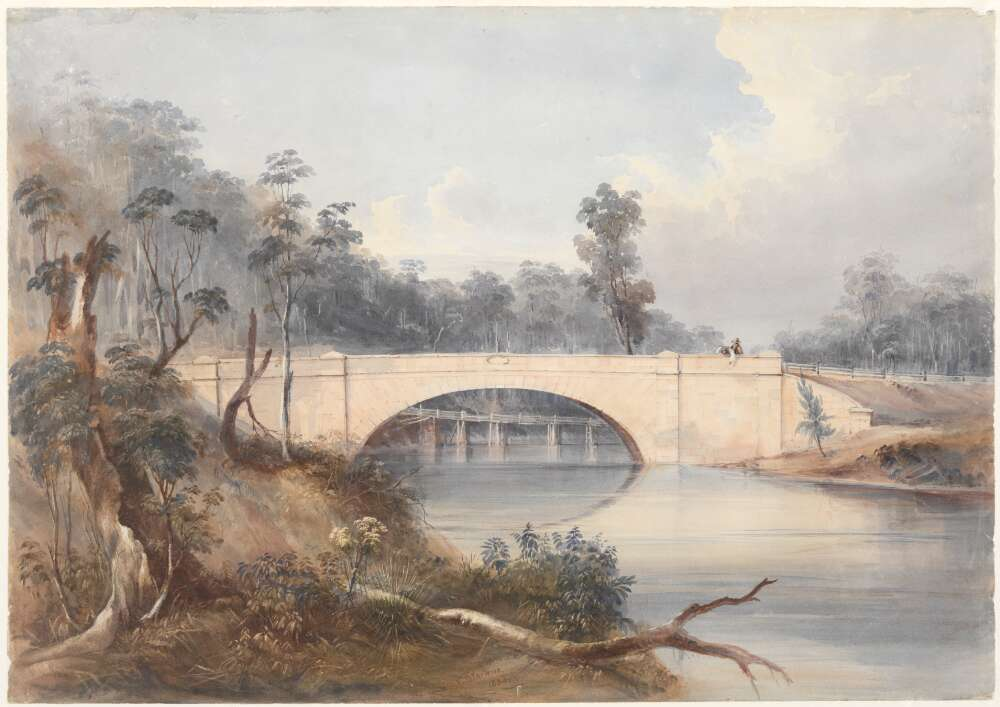
Lansdowne Bridge and Bowlers Bridge, 1836

The bridge is described in the NSW Heritage Register as:

"A large sandstone arched bridge spanning the Prospect Creek. The single arch has supporting buttresses. The clear span is 110 feet (34 m) while the clearance above mean water level is 76 feet (23 m) at the centre. It has curved abutments and approaches, while the parapets and mouldings are simple and devoid of unnecessary ornamentation. Some of the radiating voussoirs are quite large in size measuring up to eight feet (2.4 m) in length."

It is listed on the Register of the National Estate and on the National Historic Engineering Landmark list, which states:

"Lansdowne Bridge is considered to be one of the finest examples of Colonial Architecture in Australia as well as David Lennox's masterpiece of design. Lansdowne Bridge was built by convicts during 1834 to 1836. The sandstone arch has the largest span of any surviving masonry bridge in Australia. The size, appearance, and durability make this bridge an outstanding example of colonial engineering."

The Hawkesbury sandstone used in building the bridge was quarried on the bank of George's River at present day East Hills, 11 kilometres (6.8 mi) from the proposed site of the bridge, allowing workers to row a punt to transport the stone to the construction site. The bridge was constructed entirely by unskilled convicts, despite Lennox's numerous requests to Mitchell for skilled labourers.

== History ==
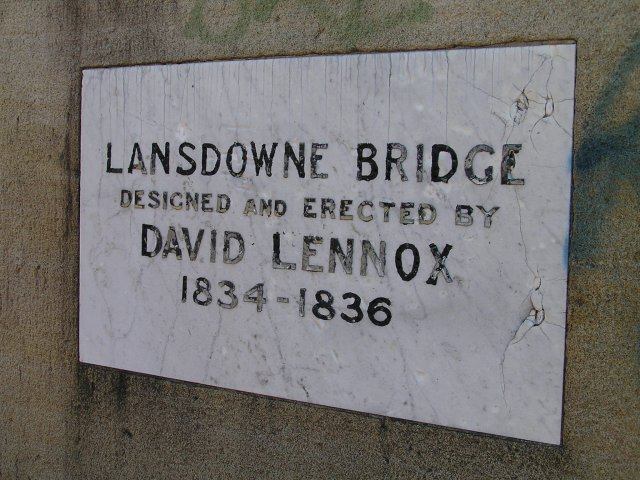
Plaque on bridge

Lansdowne Bridge was designed and built from 1834 to 1836 by David Lennox. Born in Ayr, Scotland in 1788, David Lennox was trained as a stonemason. He worked on the Menai Suspension Bridge at Anglesey in Wales and on Gloucester, United Kingdom Bridge, where he learnt the sound construction principles he used on his later projects in NSW.

He emigrated to Australia in 1832. and immediately found employment as a mason with the government. While working on the Legislative Council Chambers in Macquarie Street, Sydney, Lennox met the Surveyor-General, Thomas Mitchell. The Surveyor-General lost little time in submitting Lennox's credentials to the Governor of NSW Sir Richard Bourke, describing him as "a very well qualified person recently arrived in the Colony." Acting on Mitchell's recommendation, Bourke provisionally appointed Lennox as a Sub-Inspector of Bridges at a salary of £120 ($240) per annum. Lennox's appointment was confirmed by London as Superintendent of Bridges in June 1833. In 1832 Mitchell commissioned Lennox for a sum of £1,083 ($2,166) to build a bridge "at the intersection of Prospect Creek and Southern Street", which would replace the nearby "Bowler's Bridge", named after a local innkeeper.

In July 1833 Lennox told Mitchell of a mutiny that had occurred at the quarry while he had been away on an inspection tour. Some of the convicts had rebelled and had consumed the contents of a nearby liquor still. Returning to the camp drunk they threatened to kill the supervisor and destroy the camp and quarrying equipment. The police from Liverpool were called and arrested the offenders. Retribution at Liverpool Court was swift and savage; those who were spared the chain gang received up to fifty lashes of the "cat".

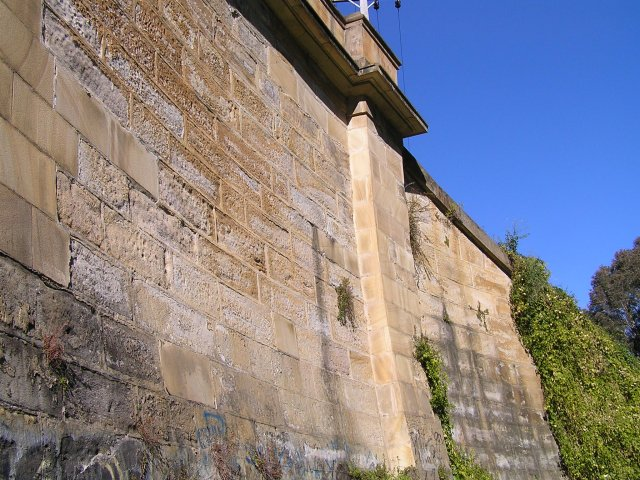
Closeup of sandstone walls of bridge

On 1 January 1834, Governor Bourke visited the site of the bridge to lay the foundation stone. Within hours of the laying of the inscription plate it was stolen. Lennox made arrangements to obtain a duplicate plate but the original was found and restored to the bridge. On 7 June 1834, Lennox applied for more labourers, the bridge being at a stage where the centring could commence. This was the construction of a rigid timber frame to hold each stone in place until the arch became self-supporting. It was a critical process and any inaccuracies would cause instability or collapse of the arch.

The bridge was completed a year later in late 1835. Upon being advised that the bridge was nearing completion, Governor Bourke selected 26 January 1836 for the official opening date, as this coincided with the 48th anniversary of the colony's foundation. The opening ceremony was held in front of a crowd of around 1,000. The bridge's opening was delayed by several months as the toll house was not complete. Once tolls started to be collected, the bridge soon recovered its cost, generating £685/1/4 in annual receipts in 1844. Later, Governor Bourke wrote that the bridge had cost only £1,000 to build, compared to the £7,000 it would have taken to build a bridge of the same quality in England.

In 1956, rather than employ the reinforced concrete beam bridge design that the Department of Main Roads normally used at that time, the DMR commenced construction of a duplicate bridge in the form of a concrete arch to carry southbound traffic on the Hume Highway. This bridge, completed in 1958, is a testament to the architectural and historical value of the original bridge. Both bridges remain in use.

In 1973 the Lansdowne Bridge was recognised as being "one of the finest examples of Colonial Architecture in Australia". In 1990, the Environmental Management Committee of Fairfield Council confirmed that the Lansdowne Bridge had the largest span of all masonry bridges in Australia and in 1992 that it was an example of excellent construction, which should be preserved.

== Heritage listing ==
It was listed on the New South Wales State Heritage Register on 20 June 2000, the register stating:

"The place is important in demonstrating the course, or pattern, of cultural or natural history in New South Wales.

Lansdowne Bridge is considered to be one of the finest examples of colonial architecture in Australia as well as David Lennox's masterpiece of design. Lansdowne Bridge was built by convicts during 1834 to 1836.

The place is important in demonstrating aesthetic characteristics and/or a high degree of creative or technical achievement in New South Wales.

The sandstone arch has the largest span of any surviving masonry bridge in Australia. The size, appearance and durability make this bridge an outstanding example of colonial engineering."

== See also ==
- Boothtown Aqueduct
- List of bridges in Sydney
- Lennox Bridge, Glenbrook
- Lennox Bridge, Parramatta
