= Ewen Leslie =

Australian actor

- Born: 27 July 1980 (age 46); Fremantle, Western Australia, Australia
- Education: John Curtin College of the Arts; Western Australian Academy of Performing Arts (2000)
- Occupation: Actor
- Years active: 1993–present
- Partner: Nicole O'Donohue
- Children: 2

Ewen Leslie (born 27 July 1980) is an Australian actor.

== Early life and education ==
Leslie is from Fremantle, Western Australia. He was acting in school plays at the age of ten. After seeing a newspaper advertisement for auditions for children's series Ship to Shore, he secured a role on the show from the age of 12 to 14. From there he attended high school at John Curtin College of the Arts, via a theatre scholarship, attending at the same time as fellow actor Sam Worthington, who was several years older.

Leslie wanted to attend Sydney's National Institute of Dramatic Art (NIDA) after his senior year, but missed the auditions. Instead, he ended up studying acting at Western Australian Academy of Performing Arts (WAAPA) in Perth, graduating in 2000.

== Career ==
=== Theatre ===
After graduating from WAAPA, Leslie moved to Sydney, and between bar work shifts at the Old Fitzroy Hotel, he began performing in shows at the venue. His first paid stage-acting job was a small part in a 2007 production of Paul at Belvoir Theatre, which lead to further stage roles at Belvoir. He eventually scored a role in Riflemind, a play by Andrew Upton which for Sydney Theatre Company directed by Oscar-winning actor Philip Seymour Hoffman and starring Hugo Weaving and Martin Csokas. His performance caught the attention of Cate Blanchett.

He joined the STC Actors Company in 2008 and won a Helpmann Award and a Sydney Theatre Award for his performance as Prince Hal/Henry V opposite Cate Blanchett in The War of the Roses (directed by Benedict Andrews).

In 2010, Leslie played Richard III at the Melbourne Theatre Company directed by Simon Philips. Alison Croggon in The Australian wrote: "This is a deeply intelligent performance, physically and emotionally unafraid. It marks the ascension of a remarkable actor". He won his second Helpmann Award and a Green Room Award for this performance.

The following year, Leslie played Hamlet in a sellout season at the Melbourne Theatre Company, a role he would reprise in 2013 in Sydney for Belvoir St Theatre. He played one of the lead roles in The Wild Duck (directed by Simon Stone) which had successful seasons in Sydney, Melbourne and Oslo for The Ibsen Festival.

In 2013 he was The Player in STC's Rosencrantz and Guildenstern are Dead opposite Toby Schmitz and Tim Minchin. In 2015 he travelled to Paris to perform in Simon Stone's production of Thyestes, and played the title role in Belvoir's production of Ivanov.

In 2021, Leslie returned to the Sydney Theatre Company to perform in Kip Williams' production of Julius Caesar performed by only three actors.

=== Film and television ===
Leslie's first break came when he was cast as the lead role in 2005 drama Jewboy, a film that screened at the Cannes Film Festival and Sundance Film Festival. He has since played lead roles in several drama films – Three Blind Mice (2008), Dead Europe (2012), The Daughter (2015) and The Butterfly Tree (2017). His other film appearances include war film Kokoda (2006), erotic psychological horror drama Sleeping Beauty (2011), war drama The Railway Man (2013), black comedy The Mule (2014), outback drama Sweet Country (2017) and colonial thriller The Nightingale (2017). Leslie also voiced the character of Pigling Bland in the live action / animated Peter Rabbit films.

His notable television roles include Operation Buffalo, The Luminaries, The Gloaming, The Cry, Safe Harbour, Fighting Season, Deadline Gallipoli, Devil's Dust, Mabo, Redfern Now and Rake.

In 2017, Leslie won an AACTA Award for his role as Pyke in the second season of Top of the Lake, opposite Elisabeth Moss, Nicole Kidman and Alice Englert. Maureen Ryan in Variety wrote that his performance was "subtle and powerful", while Michael Idato in the Sydney Morning Herald wrote, "In a world where fame is fleeting and often hoisted upon the undeserved, Leslie is a proper revelation. He's a stunning performer, perhaps one of the best on our screens".

In 2024, Leslie appeared in Stan thriller series Exposure and drama series Prosper. In December 2024, Leslie was named in the cast for Foxtel drama The Twelve.

Leslie has also performed voiceover work on television commercials for My State Bank, Subaru, McDonald's McCafé, University of Melbourne, Repco RACQ and BMG.

== Personal life ==
Leslie's partner of over 20 years is award-winning film producer Nicole O'Donohue, and together they have two children, Elliot and Eve.

== Filmography ==
=== Film ===
Year	Title	Role	Notes
1998	Justice	Bully	
2002	The Doppelgangers	Fitz	Short film
2004	Sold Out	Punter	Short film
2004	Right Here Right Now	SBLT Sam Fisher	Feature film
2005	Jewboy	Yuri	Feature film
2005	Live to Give	Seb	Short film
2005	The Mechanicals	Toast Man	Short film
2006	Kokoda	Wilstead	Feature film
2007	Katoomba	Don	Short film
2008	Three Blind Mice	Sam	Feature film
2008	Netherland Dwarf	Dad	Short film
2009	Lonely	Bob	Short film
2009	Apricot	Marcel	Short film
2011	Sleeping Beauty	Birdmann	Feature film
2012	Dead Europe	Isaac	Feature film
2012	Suspended	Dave	Short film
2013	Scene 16	Luke	Short film
2013	The Railway Man	Thompson	Feature film
2014	The Mule	Detective Les Paris	Feature film
2015	The Daughter	Oliver Finch	Feature film
2015	Death in Bloom	Christopher Crumples	Short film
2017	The Butterfly Tree	Al	Feature film
2017	Sweet Country	Harry March	Feature film
2017	Face	James	Short film
2018	Peter Rabbit	Pigling Bland (voice)	Feature film
2018	The Nightingale	Goodwin	Feature film
2021	Peter Rabbit 2: The Runaway	Pigling Bland (voice)	Feature film
2022	The Stranger	Assistant Commissioner Milliken	Feature film
2026	Leviticus		Feature film
TBA	Mr Pillow		Upcoming
TBA	Starman		Upcoming

=== Television ===
Year	Title	Role	Notes
1993	Ship to Shore	Guido Bellini	52 episodes
1996	Bush Patrol	Dave	1 episode
1997	The Gift	Boy	Episode: "The Cockroach Rap"
2001	Wild Kat	Morgan Ritchie	13 episodes
2002	The Road from Coorain	Reg	Television film
2002	The Junction Boys	Luke Mason	Television film
2003	All Saints	Tony Hunter	3 episodes
2006	Love My Way	Duc	8 episodes
2007	Lockie Leonard	John East	7 episodes
2009	My Place	Mr. Bracey	1 episode
2012	Mabo	Bryan Keon-Cohen	Television film
2012	Devil's Dust	Matt Peacock	Miniseries
2012	Redfern Now	Mr. Parish	2 episodes
2013	Top of the Lake	Steve (voice)	Episode: "The Edge of the Universe"
2013	Mr & Mrs Murder	Hugo	Episode: "The Course Whisperer"
2014	Wonderland	Nick Deakin	8 episodes
2015	Deadline Gallipoli	Keith Murdoch	1 episode
2015	No Activity	Police officer (voice)	6 episodes
2016	Janet King	Patrick Bocarro	5 episodes
2016	Rake	Bevan Leigh	3 episodes
2017	Top of the Lake	Pyke	6 episodes
2017	Sisters	Abraham	2 episodes
2018	Safe Harbour	Ryan Gallagher	Miniseries
2018	Fighting Season	Captain Edward 'Ted' Nordenfelt	Main cast
2018	The Cry	Alistair Robertson	Main cast
2020	The Luminaries	Crosbie Wells	Main cast
2020	The Gloaming	Alex O’Connell	Main cast
2020	Operation Buffalo	Major Leo Carmichael	Main cast
2022	Pieces of Her	Arthur Gibson	4 episodes
2022	Bali 2002	Tom Keirath	1 episode
2023	The Clearing	Tom Atkins	1 episode
2024	Prosper	Dion Quinn	8 episodes
2024	Colin from Accounts	Constable Byrne	1 episode
2024	Exposure	Jim	1 episode
2025	The Twelve		Season 3: "Cape Rock Killer"

== Theatre ==
Year	Show	Role	Venue
2002	Flowers in the Snow		Newtown Theatre, Sydney for Short+Sweet
2003	Votive Offerings	Troy	Darlinghurst Theatre, Sydney
2003	Woyzeck	Doctor	Old Fitzroy Theatre, Sydney
2003	Chicks Will Dig You!	Seb	Belvoir St Theatre, Sydney
2004	Cross Sections	Aaron	Tamarama Rock Surfers, Sydney
2004	This Blasted Earth / A Christmas Miracle With Music	Father Tim / Scarlett	Old Fitzroy Theatre, Sydney with Tamarama Rock Surfers, Sydney
2005	Top Shorts		Old Fitzroy Theatre, Sydney with Naked Theatre Company
2005–2006	Shakesperealism	Lewis	The Naked Theatre Company
2006	Emergency Sex (and Other Desperate Measures)		Wharf Theatre, Sydney
2006	Plays: By Himself		Old Fitzroy Theatre, Sydney
2007	Paul	Yeshua	Belvoir St Theatre, Sydney
2007	Dead Caesar	Cassius	Wharf Theatre, Sydney with STC
2007	Riflemind	Lee	Wharf Theatre, Sydney with STC
2008	The Serpent's Teeth	Sam Lewis	Sydney Opera House with STC
2008	Gallipoli	Billy Hughes / Atatürk	Sydney Theatre
2009	The War of the Roses	Prince Hal / Henry V / George of Clarence	Sydney Theatre, His Majesty's Theatre, Perth
2009	The Promise	Marat	Belvoir St Theatre, Sydney
2010	Richard III	Richard III, Duke of Gloucester	Southbank Theatre, Melbourne with MTC
2010	The Trial	Josef K.	Wharf Theatre, Sydney, Malthouse Theatre, Melbourne, Subiaco Arts Centre, Perth with STC
2011	Hamlet	Prince Hamlet	MTC
2011–2012	The Wild Duck	Hjalmar Ekdal	Malthouse Theatre, Melbourne, Nationaltheatret, Oslo, Norway with Belvoir St Theatre, Sydney
2013	Cat on a Hot Tin Roof	Brick Pollitt	Belvoir St Theatre, Sydney, Theatre Royal Sydney
2013	Rosencrantz and Guildenstern Are Dead	The Player	STC
2013	Hamlet	Prince Hamlet	Belvoir St Theatre, Sydney
2015	Thyestes	Atreus	Belvoir St Theatre, Sydney, Théâtre Nanterre-Amandiers, France
2015	Ivanov	Nikolai Ivanov	Belvoir St Theatre, Sydney
2021	Julius Caesar	Cassius / various roles	Wharf Theatre, Sydney with STC
2022–2023	The Strange Case of Dr Jekyll and Mr Hyde	Henry Jekyll / Edward Hyde / various roles	Roslyn Packer Theatre, Sydney, Her Majesty's Theatre, Adelaide with STC

== Awards and nominations ==
Year	Ceremony	Category	Work	Result
2005	Australian Film Institute Awards	Outstanding Achievement in Craft in a Non-Feature	Jewboy	Nominated
2006	Movie Extra Filmink Awards	Best Australian Newcomer	Jewboy	Nominated
2009	Sydney Theatre Awards	Best Actor in a Lead Role	The War of the Roses	Won
2009	Helpmann Awards	Best Male Actor in a Supporting Role in a Play	The War of the Roses	Won
2010	Helpmann Awards	Best Male Actor in a Play	Richard III	Won
2010	Green Room Awards	Best Male Actor	Richard III	Won
2011	Sydney Theatre Awards	Best Actor in a Lead Role	The Wild Duck	Nominated
2012	Australian Film Critics Association Awards	Best Actor	Dead Europe	Nominated
2012	Film Critics Circle of Australia Awards	Best Actor	Dead Europe	Nominated
2012	Green Room Awards	Best Ensemble – Theatre Companies	The Wild Duck	Nominated
2012	Green Room Awards	Best Male Actor	The Wild Duck	Nominated
2013	Equity Ensemble Awards	Most Outstanding Performance by an Ensemble in a Television Movie or Miniseries	Mabo	Nominated
2013	Equity Ensemble Awards	Most Outstanding Performance by an Ensemble in a Television Movie or Miniseries	Devil's Dust	Won
2013	Sydney Theatre Awards	Best Actor in a Supporting Role	Rosencrantz and Guildenstern Are Dead	Nominated
2014	Glugs Theatrical Awards	Best Supporting Actor	Rosencrantz and Guildenstern Are Dead	Nominated
2014	Helpmann Awards	Best Male Actor in a Supporting Role in a Play	Rosencrantz and Guildenstern Are Dead	Nominated
2014	AACTA Awards	Best Actor in a Leading Role	Dead Europe	Nominated
2015	Sydney Theatre Awards	Best Actor in a Lead Role	Ivanov	Nominated
2016	AACTA Awards	Best Actor in a Leading Role	The Daughter	Nominated
2016	Film Critics Circle of Australia Awards	Best Actor	The Daughter	Nominated
2017	Australian Film Critics Association Awards	Best Actor	The Daughter	Nominated
2017	AACTA Awards	Best Actor in a Leading Role	The Butterfly Tree	Nominated
2017	AACTA Awards	Best Guest or Supporting Actor in a Television Drama	Top of the Lake	Won
2018	Logie Awards	Most Outstanding Actor	Safe Harbour	Nominated
2019	Australian Film Critics Association	Best Supporting Actor	Sweet Country	Nominated
2019	Equity Ensemble Awards	Most Outstanding Performance by an Ensemble in a Television Movie or Miniseries	Safe Harbour	Nominated
2019	Logie Awards	Most Outstanding Supporting Actor	Fighting Season	Nominated
2019	AACTA Awards	Best Guest or Supporting Actor in a Television Drama	Fighting Season	Nominated
2019	AACTA Awards	Best Guest or Supporting Actor in a Television Drama	The Cry	Nominated
2020	New Zealand Film and Television Awards	Best Supporting Actor	The Luminaries	Nominated
2020	AACTA Awards	AACTA Award for Best Lead Actor in a Television Drama	Operation Buffalo	Nominated
