= Lennox Bridge, Parramatta =

Heritage-listed pedestrian and rail bridge in Sydney, New South Wales, Australia

Lennox Bridge
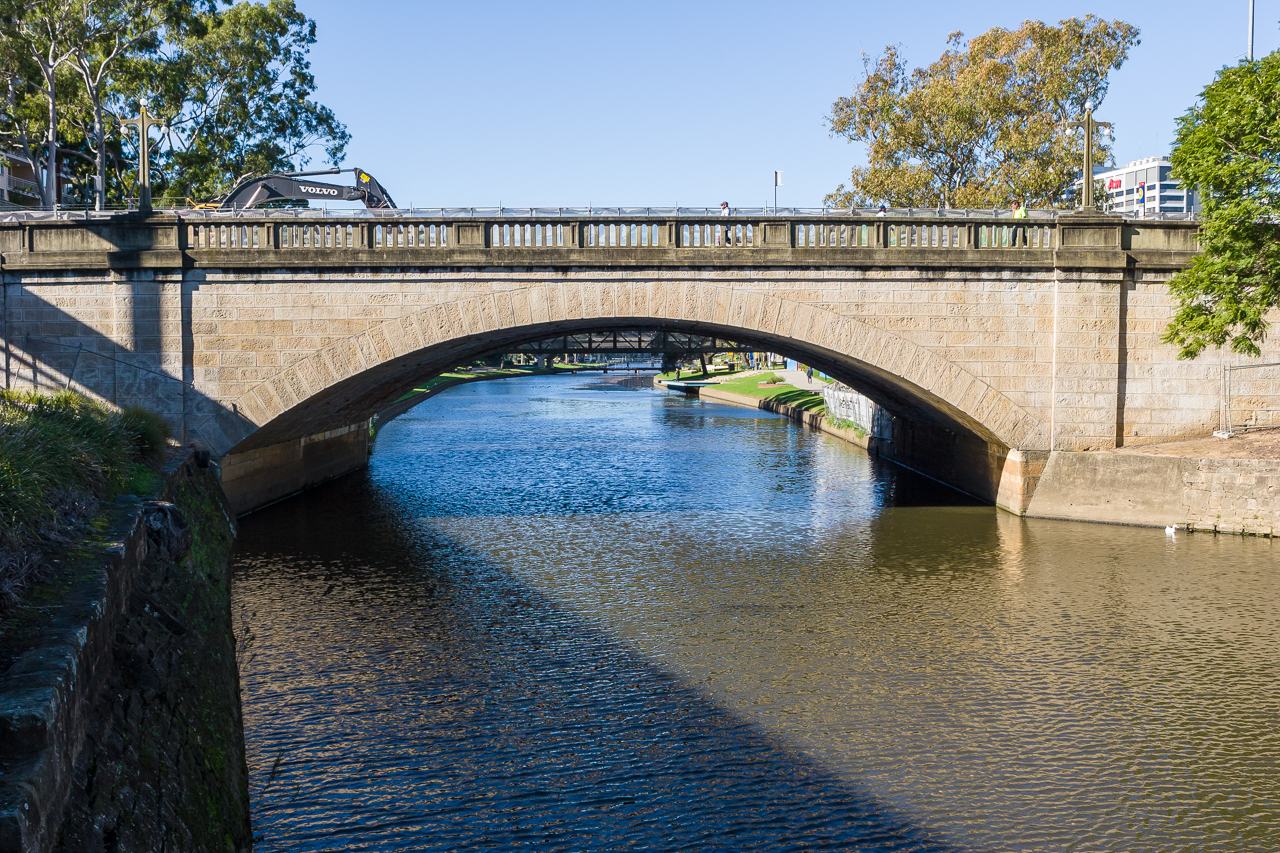
- The Lennox Bridge in Parramatta, from the west
- Coordinates: 33°48′39″S 151°00′16″E
- Carries: Church Street, Parramatta: Pedestrians; Light Rail
- Crosses: Parramatta River
- Locale: Parramatta, Western Sydney, New South Wales, Australia
- Named for: David Lennox
- Owner: Parramatta City Council
- Preceded by: Gaol Bridge (1804–1836)

Characteristics
- Design: Single arch bridge
- Material: Hawkesbury sandstone
- Total length: 27 metres (90 ft)
- Width: 9.1 metres (30 ft)
- Longest span: 23 metres (76 ft)
- No. of spans: 1

History
- Designer: David Lennox
- Construction start: 22 October 1836
- Construction end: 1839
- Construction cost: £1,797

New South Wales Heritage Register
- Type: Built
- Criteria: a., e., f.
- Designated: 2 April 1999
- Reference no.: 00750

Location
- Interactive map of Lennox Bridge

The Lennox Bridge is a heritage-listed sandstone single arch bridge across the Parramatta River, located in Parramatta in Western Sydney, New South Wales, Australia. The bridge was designed by and built under the supervision of David Lennox, the first Colonial Superintendent of Bridges using convict labour between 1836 and 1839. The Lennox Bridge is the third oldest surviving masonry bridge in New South Wales. The bridge carries Church Street, the main north-south street of Parramatta's central business district. It was added to the New South Wales State Heritage Register on 2 April 1999.

The bridge carries the Parramatta Light Rail, which runs on-street along Church Street.

== History ==
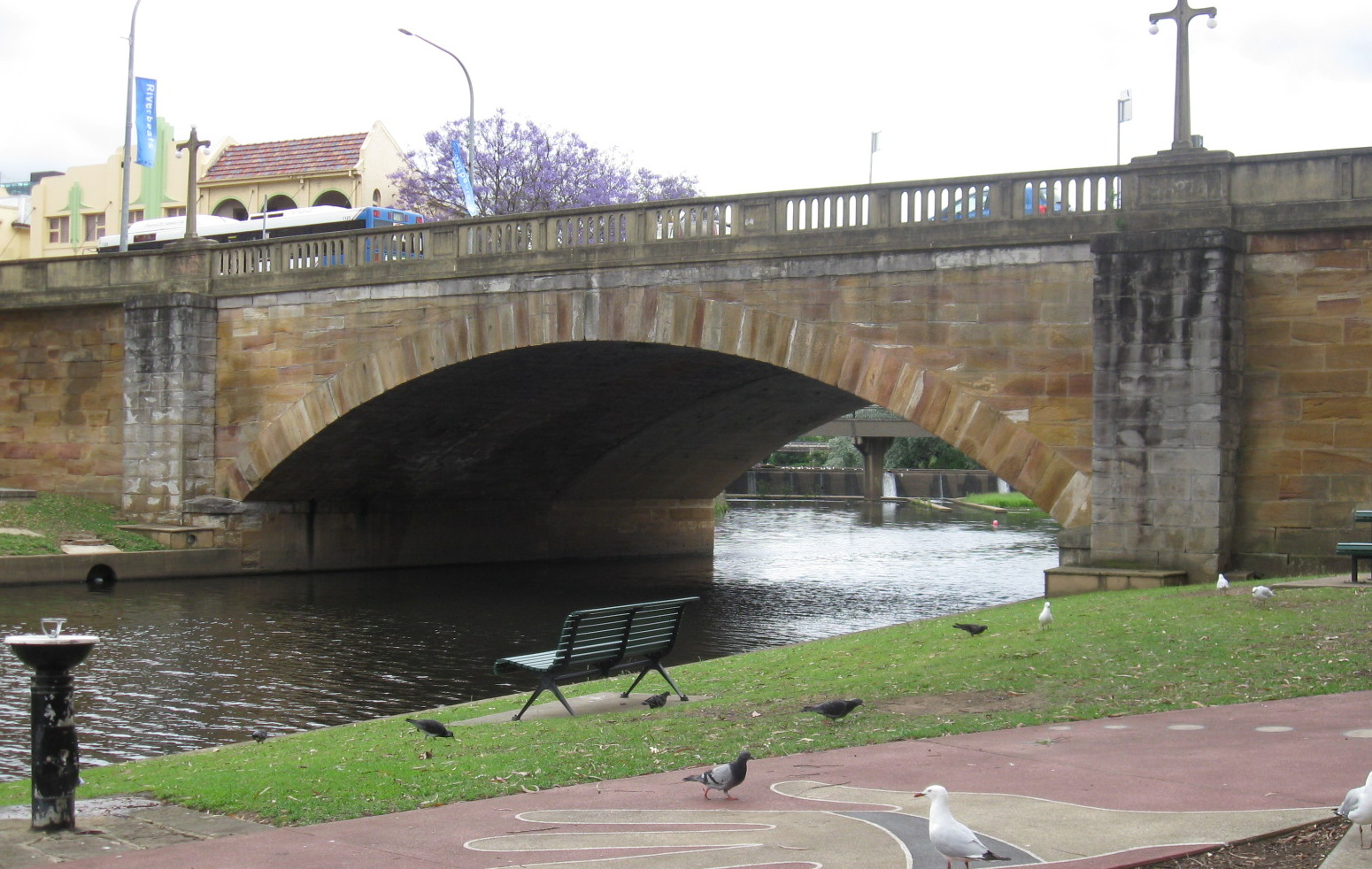
A view of the Lennox Bridge from the northeastern bank of Parramatta River.

The Lennox Bridge is on the site of the earliest documented crossing of the Parramatta River in the Parramatta area, dating from early colonial settlement. The current bridge is the third on, or adjacent to, the site. The first was a simple timber footbridge which was destroyed by floods in 1795. The second bridge, called the Gaol Bridge, was built on stone piers with timber railings and was completed between 1802 and 1804.

The current Lennox Bridge is a single span stone elliptical arch bridge over Parramatta River on the line of Church Street, and is constructed of sandstone sourced from the Parramatta Female Factory quarry. Completed in 1839, the bridge cost £1,797 to complete.

This was David Lennox's third and final bridge, his first two being the Lennox Bridge at Glenbrook, completed in 1833 (making it the second-oldest bridge on the Australian mainland, the oldest being the bridge at the base of Devines Hill at Wisemans Ferry on the Great North Road, which was completed in 1829–1830) and the Lansdowne Bridge, Lansvale, completed in 1836.

In 1885–1886 the Department of Public Works removed the wall on the upstream (i.e. western) side of the bridge to widen it, and put up the present railing at the same time. In 1901–02 the bridge was strengthened internally for the Castle Hill Tramway. In 1912 the parapet on the western side was removed, providing a cantilevered pedestrian way. In 1934–1935 this new section was removed, the Department of Main Roads widening the bridge in order to handle increased traffic. This modification saw the replacement of the cantilevered walk-way with an open concrete type and the straightening of the curved western face.

In the 1990s Lennox Bridge was saved from demolition by campaigning by the National Trust of Australia (NSW).

== Description ==
Lennox Bridge is a single sandstone arch bridge spanning 27.73 metres (91.0 ft), the clear span of the arch being 23.16 metres (76.0 ft) across the Parramatta River with approaches on the line of Church Street.

== Construction of tunnels for pedestrians and cyclists ==
In 2012 a controversial proposal to construct tunnels through the bridge on both sides of the bank for pedestrians and cyclists was approved by Parramatta City Council; and work began in early 2014 with expectations to open before Christmas that year. However, there was a delay attributed to archeological investigations that uncovered a sandstone pier and timber girders of the second bridge on that site, built between 1802 and 1804. While both portals opened in 2015, the southern tunnel was closed off to assist with the construction of the Parramatta Light Rail (completed in 2024), and The Lennox, a riverfront high-rise residential apartment building, which will include a new public walkway on the western side of the southern tunnel.

== Parramatta Light Rail ==
In 2019, construction began on the first stage of the Parramatta Light Rail line, servicing Westmead to Carlingford via the Parramatta CBD and Camellia with a two-way track spanning 12 kilometres, and opened on 20 December 2024. As part of the project, a light rail and pedestrian zone was established on Church Street between Market Street and Macquarie Street (including the Lennox Bridge) and the existing bridge was retained, including the recently constructed active transport portals through the approaches, and serves as a crossing for light rail, pedestrians and emergency vehicles only (i.e. no general road traffic).

== Heritage listing ==
Lennox Bridge is one of Parramatta's most important historic structures, and one of the earliest bridges in New South Wales and Australia. It is an example of the work of notable engineer David Lennox. The site possesses potential to contribute to an understanding of early urban development in Parramatta. The bridge is both historically and technically significant, and is rare.

Lennox Bridge, Parramatta was listed on the New South Wales State Heritage Register on 2 April 1999.

== See also ==
- List of bridges in Sydney
- Historic bridges of New South Wales
