= James Hardie Industries =

Irish building materials company

James Hardie Industries plc
- Type: Public
- Traded as: ASX: JHX; NYSE: JHX; S&P 400 component
- Industry: Building materials
- Founded: 1888; 138 years ago
- Founder: James Hardie
- Headquarters: Dublin, Ireland; Chicago, United States
- Area served: United States; Australia; Europe; New Zealand
- Key people: Aaron Erter (CEO)
- Products: Fibre cement building materials Residential & commercial facades Siding & weatherboards
- Revenue: US$3.9 billion (2024)
- Number of employees: 5,679 (2024)
- Website: www.jameshardie.com

James Hardie Industries plc is an American-Irish global building materials company and the largest global manufacturer of fibre cement products. Headquartered in Ireland, it is cross-listed on the Australian and New York Stock Exchanges. Its management team currently sits in Chicago, Illinois, United States. James Hardie was plagued by several asbestos-related scandals in the 20th century.

== History ==
James Hardie (27 July 1851 – 20 November 1920) emigrated to Australia in 1888 from Linlithgow, Scotland, and established a business importing oils and animal hides. Andrew Reid, also from Linlithgow, came to join Hardie in Melbourne, and became a full partner in 1895. When Hardie retired in 1911, he sold his half of the business to Reid.

=== Listing on Sydney Stock Exchange and asbestos-containing products ===
The company was listed on the Sydney Stock Exchange in 1951. At the time, the company manufactured products out of asbestos cement sheet and other related building material. By the middle of the twentieth century, James Hardie had become the largest manufacturer and distributor of building products, insulation, pipes and brake linings containing asbestos. In Australia, it operated asbestos plants in New South Wales, Queensland, South Australia, Victoria and Western Australia. Working with the products containing asbestos – including asbestos cement – caused people to develop various pleural abnormalities such as asbestosis and malignant mesothelioma. In 1961, it merged its brake lining division with Turner & Newall's Ferodo, taking a 60% shareholding in Hardie-Ferodo. It purchased the remaining 40% in August 1980.

=== Asbestos ===
In 1978 the effects of pleural abnormalities and other asbestos-related diseases were beginning to show up in the former mine workers. While other companies were involved in similar asbestos-related activities, most notably CSR, more than 50% of claims made to the Dust Diseases Tribunal of New South Wales in 2002 were brought against companies in the James Hardie group.

There were protests against the companies' operations near the small Aboriginal Australian community of Baryulgil on the NSW North Coast, with Lyall Munro Snr and the NSW Aboriginal Legal Service taking an active part in actions against the company.

James Hardie and its subsidiaries had been providing compensation for victims of its operations since the 1980s. Though some earlier claims had arisen, the proliferation of cases from the 1980s onwards forced James Hardie to acknowledge that it had known asbestos to be dangerous. James Hardie nonetheless maintained that it had done everything possible to protect workers. In 1978 the company began putting warning labels on its products explaining that inhalation of the dust could result in cancer. In March 1987 James Hardie ceased all asbestos manufacturing activities.

As concern grew about the serious adverse health effects of asbestos, in the mid-1980s James Hardie developed an asbestos-free fibre cement technology, without the dangers associated with asbestos.

==== The MRCF and move to the Netherlands ====
James Hardie had been structured as a parent company operating through subsidiaries since the 1930s. All asbestos operations, including the provision of compensation, were undertaken by James Hardie's subsidiaries, principally James Hardie and Coy and Hardie-Ferodo (later known as Jsekarb). Between 1995 and 2000, James Hardie (the parent company) began to remove the assets of these subsidiaries (since renamed Amaca and Amaba respectively), while leaving them with most of the asbestos liabilities of the James Hardie group.

In 2001 these two companies were separated from James Hardie and acquired by the Medical Research and Compensation Foundation (MRCF) which was essentially created in order to act as an administrator for Hardie's asbestos liabilities. Then CEO of James Hardie, Peter McDonald, made public announcements emphasising that the MRCF had sufficient funds to meet all future claims and that James Hardie would not give it any further substantial funds. Indeed, the net assets of the MRCF were $293 million, mostly in real estate and loans, and exceeded the 'best estimate' of $286 million in liabilities which had been estimated in an actuarial report commissioned by James Hardie. The Jackson Report found that this 'best estimate' was 'wildly optimistic' and the estimates of future liabilities was 'far too low'.

After this separation, in December 2001, the company relocated its headquarters offshore to the Netherlands, for what it claimed were significant tax advantages for the company and its shareholders. To make this move, the company had to assure Australian courts (as it was listed on the Australian Securities Exchange) that the MRCF would be able to meet future liabilities. The courts were assured of this and that more money would be made available to its Australian asbestos victims through the issue of partly paid shares to MRCF obliging the new Dutch parent company to meet a call for funds if it were needed. The value of the call at the time was $1.9 billion. The move to the Netherlands therefore proceeded. However, the tax benefits which James Hardie expected to receive as a result from its move did not eventuate following the revision of tax laws in the United States in 2001 and later with the United States signing a new trade agreement with the Netherlands in 2006.

While the move to the Netherlands resulted in tax savings of $86 million over seven years, in 2009 the Australian Taxation Office issued an amended assessment for $172 million plus interest and penalties. James Hardie successfully appealed the assessment. Also in 2009, the US Internal Revenue Service alleged that James Hardie had not been in compliance with the US-Dutch treaty since it had been implemented in 2006 and claimed $US37 million in unpaid taxes plus $US10 million in interest and penalties.

Shortly after the move, an actuarial report found that James Hardie asbestos liabilities were likely to reach $574 million. The MRCF sought extra funding from James Hardie and was offered $18 million in assets, an offer the MRCF rejected. The estimate of asbestos liabilities was promptly revised to $752 million in 2002 and then $1.58 billion in 2003. The funding shortfall became of increasing concern in 2004 as it became clear that eligible victims would miss out on receiving compensation after it was revealed that in March 2003 James Hardie had cancelled the partly paid shares that were intended to be a safety net for the fund. In discussing the shortfall with the MRCF, James Hardie refused to accept further responsibility for the liabilities on the basis that the MRCF and James Hardie were separate legal entities.

==== Inquiry ====
On 12 February 2004, a judicial inquiry into the matter was commissioned by the Government of New South Wales. The findings were very critical of James Hardie and its management. Amongst other findings, it found that the actuarial reports commissioned by James Hardie which estimated liabilities at $286 million were inadequate because they used a financial model which made unfounded predictions on the value of investments held by Amaca and Amaba, the figures were subject to numerous unspecified conditions and they did not account for the effect of separating Amaca and Amaba from James Hardie. However, the inquiry found that James Hardie was under no legal obligation to provide compensation. Despite this finding, there was immense political and social pressure on James Hardie to negotiate a compensation deal; governments were boycotting James Hardie products and unions were threatening to instigate a global union movement against the company based on refusing to handle James Hardie products.

Following the results of the inquiry, James Hardie entered into negotiations with governments and trade unions in an effort to establish some sort of compensation system for eligible victims of James Hardie's products. In December 2004, James Hardie agreed to pay compensation to the victims of its products through a voluntary compensation fund. The details of the fund were to be legally determined by June 2005 but progress was stalled and the company refused to disclose the date the deal would be finalised. Further conflicts between the company and the federal government over tax deductibility of donations to the voluntary fund saw finalisation of the deal further delayed. It was not until November 2006, after the federal government had created 'black hole' tax legislation, which made the contributions of James Hardie into the voluntary fund tax deductible, and had granted the voluntary fund tax-exempt status, that James Hardie finalised the compensation deal. There was immense pressure on the Federal Government from state governments, union leaders and victims to remove the tax problem. The final step in giving the voluntary fund a legal structure was approval of the scheme by James Hardie shareholders. In February 2007, 99.6% of shareholders voted in favour of the scheme and it began operating days later.

==== Legal action ====
After the inquiry in 2004, prosecutors were considering bringing civil and criminal charges against the CEO and other senior executives for making fraudulent statements as to the liquidity of the MRCF. In February 2007 every member of the 2001 board and some members of senior management were charged by the Australian Securities & Investments Commission (ASIC) with a range of breaches of the Corporations Act 2001 including breach of director's duties by failing to act with care and diligence.

ASIC also undertook investigations into possible criminal charges against the company's executives but in September 2008 the Commonwealth Director of Public Prosecutions decided there was insufficient evidence and charges were not pursued.

In 2009, the Supreme Court of New South Wales found that directors had misled the stock exchange in relation to James Hardie's ability to fund claims. They were also banned from serving as board members for five years. Former chief executive Peter Macdonald was banned for 15 years and fined $350,000 for his role in forming the MRCF and publicising it. The former directors, excepting Macdonald, appealed and the New South Wales Court of Appeal subsequently overturned the ruling against these directors in 2010. ASIC appealed against the ruling in the High Court of Australia in October 2011. In May 2012 the High Court upheld the 2009 New South Wales court decision and found that seven former James Hardie non-executive directors did mislead the stock exchange over the asbestos victims compensation fund.

In August 2019, Mathew Werfel, a DIY handyman from Adelaide, won $3 million in a compensation case against James Hardie. Werfel was exposed to asbestos while pulling down fences and renovating two homes between 1990 and 2000, and was diagnosed with testicular cancer in 2017. James Hardie's products no longer contain asbestos, but Werfel's lawyer claimed the company should have done more to alert the public to the existence of asbestos in its old products, which were used in older homes.

In 2021, a New Zealand court dismissed a lawsuit claiming Harditex cladding caused weather-tightness problems in New Zealand homes. The judge found that bad building methods rather than James Hardie products caused the problems.

=== Asbestos-free products ===
By the mid 1980s, James Hardie invented the modern day asbestos-free fibre cement material and had transitioned production entirely to fibre cement, a product consisting largely of Portland cement, sand, and wood fibres.

=== Subsequent relocations ===
In 2010 James Hardie moved its corporate domicile to Ireland.

James Hardie currently operates a corporate office in Chicago, Illinois, United States, and operates more than a dozen manufacturing plants around the world.

== Sponsorship and philanthropy ==
James Hardie was the naming rights sponsor of the Bathurst 500/1000 run in Australia from 1968 until 1987. It was shirt sponsor for the Parramatta Eels Australian rugby club from 1981 until 1995, and commenced sponsoring them again in 2025.

In 1988 James Hardie Industries made the largest donation ever made to an Australian public library when it gifted to the State Library of Queensland the meticulously developed and hugely significant Australian Library of Fine Art which was given as a bicentennial gift to the nation. This collection became the James Hardie Library of Australian Fine Arts, and was part of the Arts and Rare Books Unit at the State Library.

== Timeline ==
Timeline of key events from the Devil's Dust TV program:

- 2004: James Hardie CEO Peter MacDonald resigns, with a resignation payment of $9 million.
- February 2007: ASIC files court proceedings against the James Hardie board as it "failed to act with requisite care and diligence" when they assured investors that the Medical Research and Compensation Foundation (MRCF) was fully funded.
- February 2007: James Hardie shareholders overwhelmingly approve a "compensation deal for asbestos victims worth $4 billion over the next 40 years". Meredith Hellicar, Chairwoman, resigns.
- August 2007: Oncologist Professor Stephen Clarke diagnoses Banton with peritoneal mesothelioma, which is usually fatal within six months. Bernie files a new suit of exemplary damages against a former James Hardie subsidiary now part of the new Asbestos Injuries Compensation Fund. Judge John O'Meally (President of the Dust Diseases Tribunal) rules in favour of Banton, but the fund contests the judgement.
- November 2007: Gravely ill, Banton gives court evidence from his bed at Concord Repatriation General Hospital. James Hardie make an offer of settlement. Compensation for Banton's "terminal mesothelioma is from the Asbestos Injuries Compensation Fund, the trust he fought to set up in 2004". Banton dies at home (on 27 November) aged 61 surrounded by his family and close friends.
- September 2009: Journalist Matt Peacock releases his book Killer Company.
- May 2012: The High Court of Australia finds that seven directors of the James Hardie breached their duties by approving the company's release of a misleading statement to the stock exchange that the MRCF was fully funded.

== See also ==
- Asbestos and the law
- Australian Blue Asbestos
- Armley asbestos disaster
- Hamlyn (publisher)
