= Devil's Dust =

- Genre: Drama
- Written by: Kris Mrksa
- Directed by: Jessica Hobbs
- Starring: Anthony Hayes; Don Hany; Ewen Leslie; Alexandra Schepisi; Josef Ber
- Theme music composer: Antony Partos & Matteo Zingales
- Country of origin: Australia
- Original language: English
- No. of seasons: 1
- No. of episodes: 2

Production
- Executive producers: Caroline Sklan; Chris Gist; Jason Stephens
- Producers: Antonia Barnard; Stephen Corvini
- Running time: 180 minutes

Original release
- Network: ABC Television
- Release: 11 November 2012

Devil's Dust is a two-part Australian television docudrama miniseries starring Anthony Hayes, Don Hany, Ewen Leslie, Alexandra Schepisi, and Josef Ber. It was first screened in 2012 on ABC Television.

== Synopsis ==
Through the factual case of Bernie Banton, the series recounts the tragedy of many Australian workers and their families afflicted with asbestosis and mesothelioma in the twentieth-century asbestos mining and processing industries. Though the extreme health risks of exposure to asbestos dust had been documented for many years, manufacturer James Hardie persisted in large-scale use of the material, aided by inadequate regulation by state health agencies.

== Cast ==
- Anthony Hayes as Bernie Banton
- Don Hany as Adam Bourke
- Ewen Leslie as Matt Peacock
- Alexandra Schepisi as Karen Banton
- Josef Ber as Ted Banton
- Daniel Henshall as Jock
- Greg Stone as Peter McDonald
- Genevieve Hegney as Tanya Segelov
- Drew Forsythe as Bob Carr
- John Batchelor as Jack Rush QC
- Katherine Hicks as Janis Banton
- Ursula Yovich as Pauline Gordon
- Daniel Webber as Young Guy
- Jane Allsop as Eva Francis

== Production ==
Based on journalist Matt Peacock's 2009 book Killer Company, Devil's Dust was researched and developed by producer Stephen Corvini for over two years prior to the series' production.

The series was written by Kris Mrksa.

== Timeline ==
Timeline of key events from the Devil's Dust TV program:

- 2004: James Hardie (JH) CEO Peter MacDonald resigns, with a resignation payment of $9 million.
- 2006: Bernie Banton, AM, is given the keys to Parramatta City.
- February 2007: ASIC files court proceedings against the JH board as it "failed to act with requisite care and diligence" when they assured investors that the Medical Research and Compensation Foundation (MRCF) was fully funded.
- February 2007: JH shareholders, overwhelmingly approve a "compensation deal for asbestos victims worth $4 billion over the next 40 years". Meredith Hellicar, chairwoman, resigns.
- August 2007: Oncologist Professor Stephen Clarke diagnoses Banton with "peritoneal mesothelioma", which is usually fatal within six months. Bernie files a new suit of exemplary damages against a former JH subsidiary now part of the new Asbestos Injuries Compensation Fund. Judge John O’Meally (President of the Dust Diseases Tribunal) rules in favour of Banton, but the fund contests the judgement.
- November 2007: Gravely ill, Banton gives court evidence from his bed at Concord Hospital, Sydney. JH make an offer of settlement. Compensation for Banton's "terminal mesothelioma is from the Asbestos Injuries Compensation Fund, the trust he fought to set up in 2004". Banton dies at home (on 27 November) aged 61 surrounded by his family and close friends.
- September 2009: Journalist Matt Peacock releases his book Killer Company.
- May 2012: The High Court of Australia finds that seven directors of the JH "breached their duties by approving the company’s release of a misleading statement to the stock exchange that the MRCF was fully funded".

== Release ==
The series premiered on 11 November 2012 on ABC Television.
