= David Lennox =

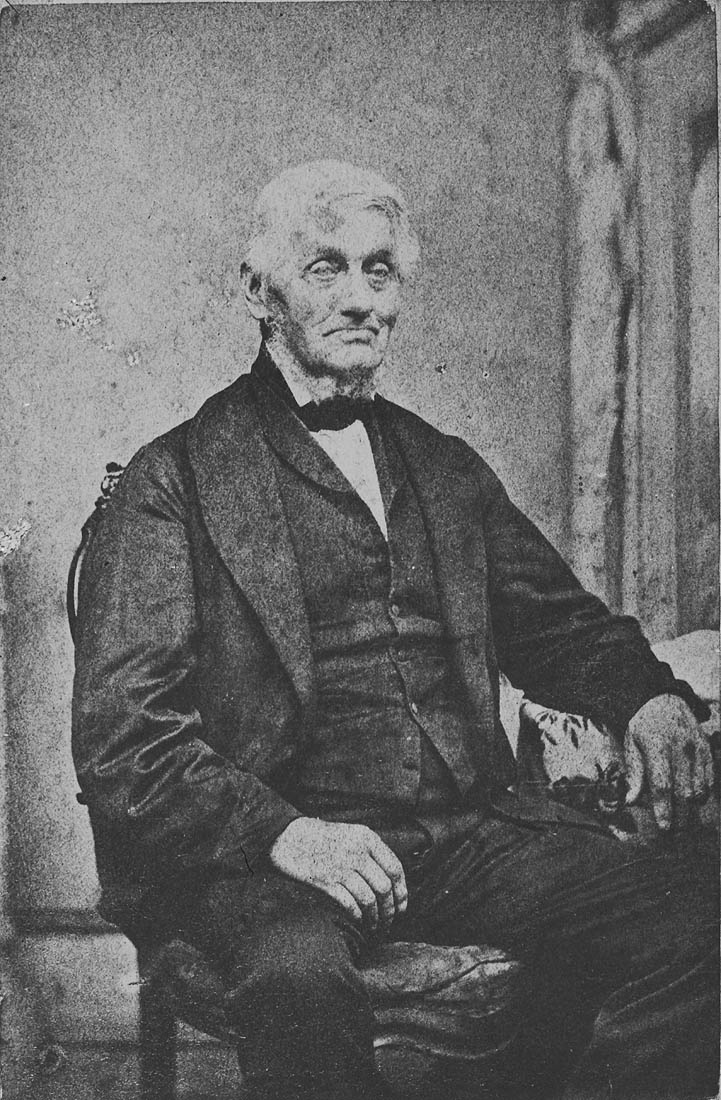
- Born: Ayr, Scotland
- Baptised: February 1788
- Died: 12 November 1873 (aged 85); New South Wales
- Known for: Pioneering bridge building

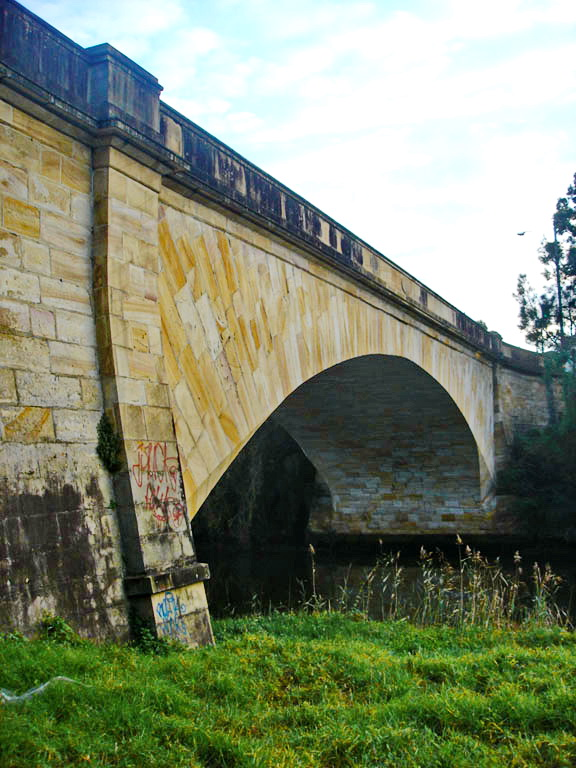
Lansdowne Bridge over Prospect Creek on the Hume Highway at Lansdowne. Opened in 1836, it carries traffic to this day.

David Lennox (1788 – 12 November 1873) was a Scottish-Australian bridge builder and master stonemason born in Ayr, Scotland.

== Personal details ==
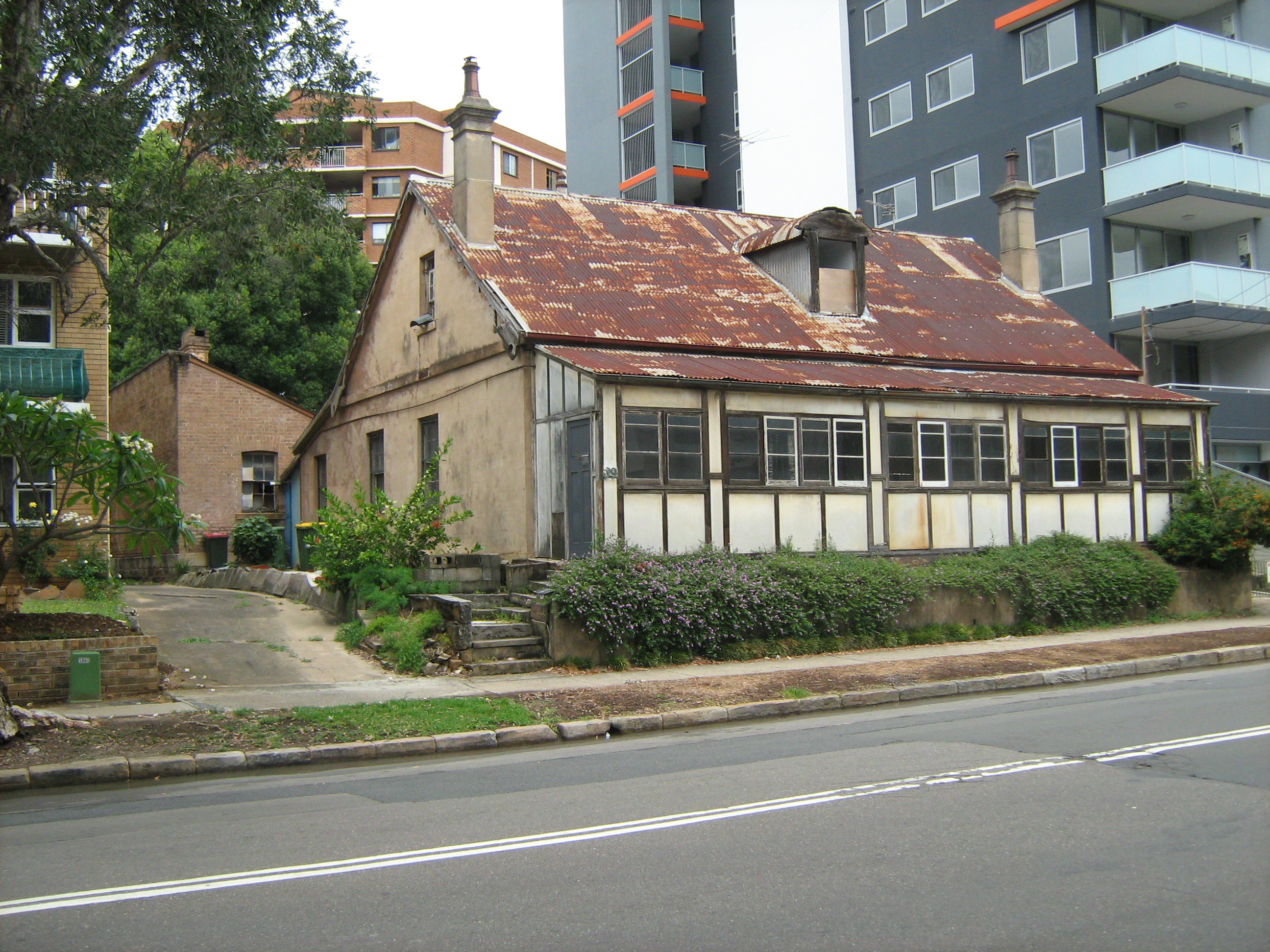
Lennox's house at 39 Campbell Street, Parramatta

Trained as a stonemason, Lennox worked on Telford's Menai Suspension Bridge at Anglesey in Wales and on Over Bridge at Gloucester before emigrating to Australia following the death of his wife. He arrived in August 1832 aboard the ship Florentia.

Prior to this time, the young colony of New South Wales had no skilled stonemasons, and so it was almost fate that a chance meeting with the Surveyor-General, Major Thomas Mitchell should result in Lennox—by now a Master Stonemason with twenty years' experience—becoming, provisionally, Sub-Inspector of Bridges and later Superintendent of Bridges.

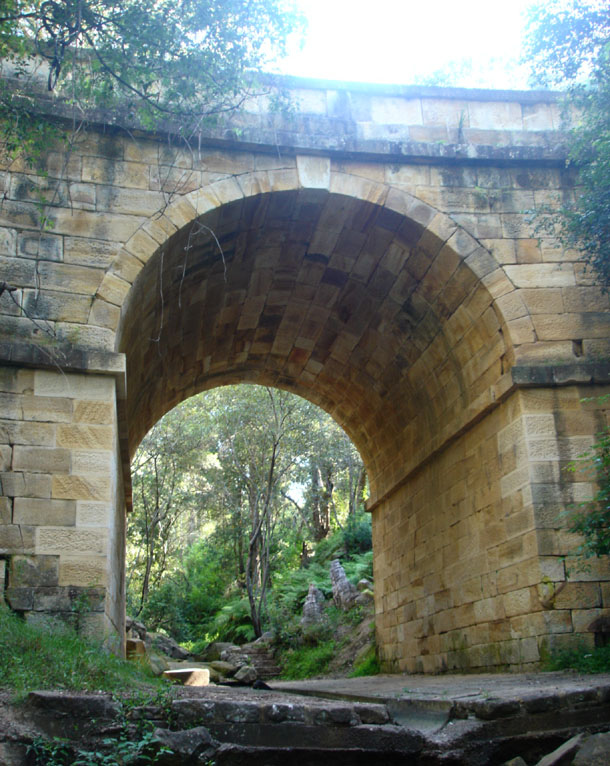
The historic Lennox Bridge at Lapstone Hill is the oldest bridge on the Australian mainland.

Lennox moved to Melbourne in 1844, to take up a position responsible for bridges in the Port Phillip district.

Lennox retired in November 1853 and returned to New South Wales two years later where he lived in Parramatta. He died on 12 November 1873, and was buried in old St John's cemetery, Parramatta. His grave was never marked so it is not known exactly where he was interred.

== Partial list of works ==
- 1832 – Lennox Bridge

In 1832, the year of his arrival in the colony, Lennox was commissioned to oversee the construction of the bridges for the new road over the Blue Mountains including a bridge over Brookside Creek at Lapstone Hill. Construction began in 1832 with Lennox supervising the efforts of twenty convicts who had little, if any, masonry skills. Lennox Bridge is the oldest surviving complete bridge on the Australian mainland (it is predated by Richmond Bridge in Tasmania, completed 1825, and by the foundations of several bridges north of Wisemans Ferry including Clares Bridge on the Great North Road, built in 1830).

- 1832-1835 – Lansdowne Bridge

Lennox was also responsible for the construction of historic Lansdowne Bridge over Prospect Creek which he was enlisted to build in 1832, with construction beginning the very next year using locally quarried stone. After three years, it was opened in January 1836 and with a toll charged for crossing, the construction costs were soon recovered.

- 1836 – Liverpool Dam

Lennox oversaw the construction of the Liverpool Dam, one of the first engineered weirs built in New South Wales, which both supplied water to the town of Liverpool and served as a causeway across the Georges River. Constructed under the supervision of Capt. Christie of the 80th Regiment; assistant engineer and superintendent of Ironed Gangs in the Town of Liverpool.

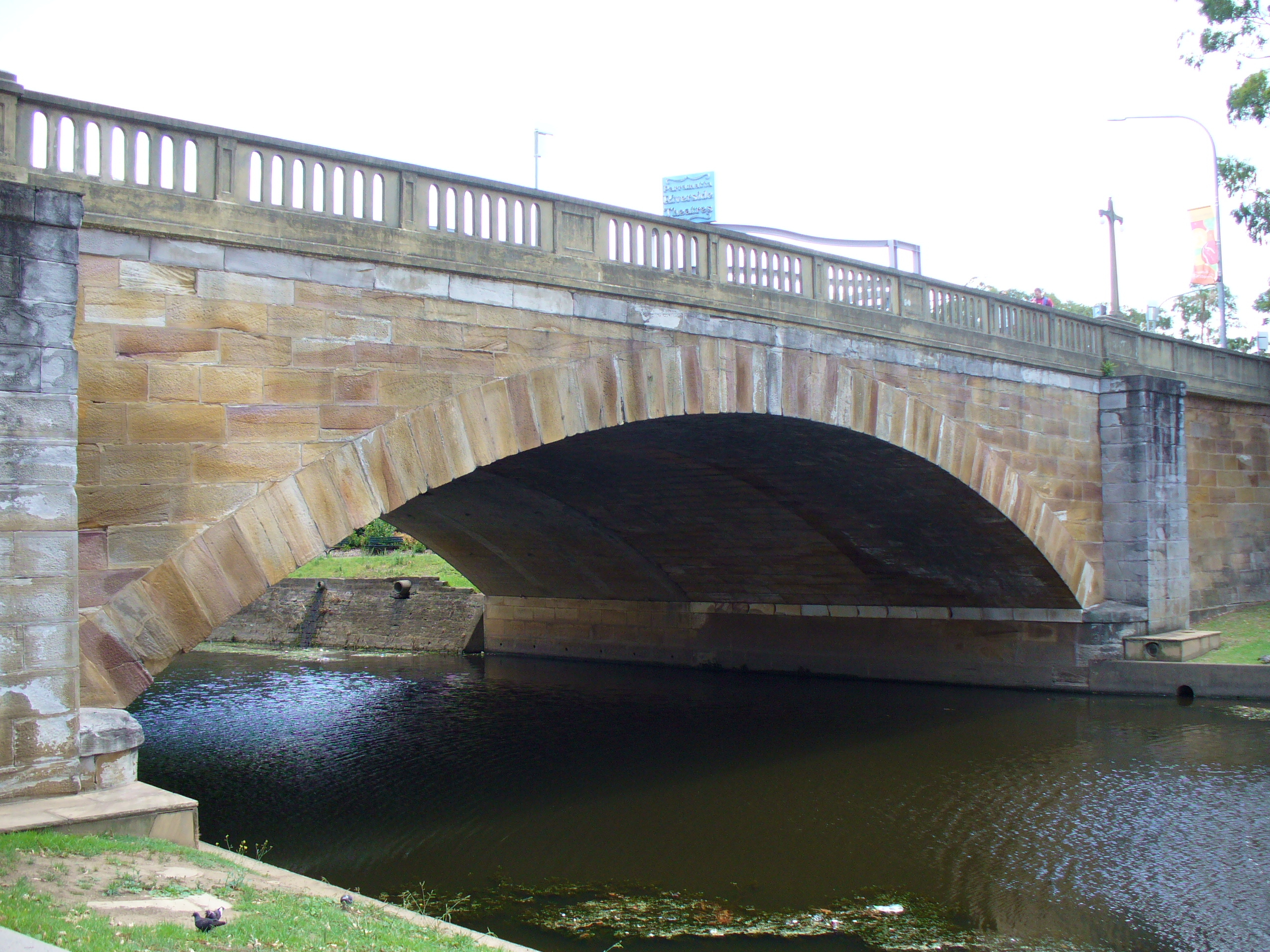
The Lennox Bridge over the Parramatta River opened in 1839.

- 1836-1839 – Lennox Bridge, Parramatta

Designed in 1835 as an elliptical arch of 90 feet (27 m) span, the bridge over the Parramatta River at Parramatta was ultimately built as a simple stone arch spanning 80 feet (24 m) and having a width of 39 feet (12 m). Construction began in November 1836, using the centring from the Lansdowne Bridge, adjusted to the new span, and the work was finished in 1839. It was named Lennox Bridge by the Parramatta Council some 28 years later.

- 1839 – Parramatta Boundary Markers

Lennox oversaw the installation of 9 carved stones which marked the former parish boundaries of Parramatta. Of the original 9, 4 can still be seen in their original locations.

- 1844-1853 – Lennox built fifty-three bridges in the nine years he was in the employ of Victoria, including the second Prince's Bridge over the Yarra River in Melbourne. The 46 metres (151 ft) stone arch was the largest built by Lennox and was opened in 1851. It was to last until the river was widened some thirty-five years later, and in 1888 was replaced by the present Prince's Bridge. It is possible that he designed Towrang Bridge (1839) that once carried the Hume Highway.

As well as bridges, Lennox was also in charge of roads, wharves and ferries in the Port Phillip district.
