= Chipping Norton Islands =

Four lake islands in Sydney, Australia

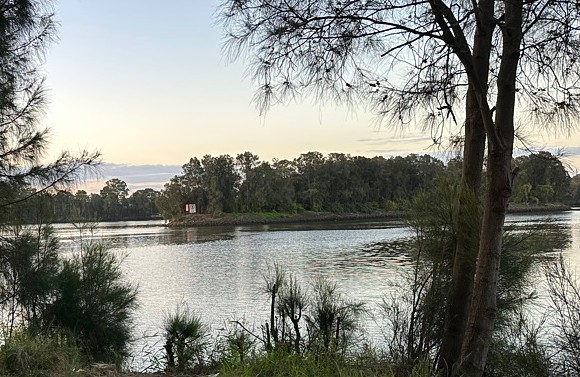
- Daruk Island, one of the islands on the lake
- Interactive map of Chipping Norton Islands

Geography
- Location: Chipping Norton, Lansvale, Cabramatta
- Coordinates: 33.901221°S 150.961327°E
- Adjacent to: Chipping Norton Lake; Georges River
- Total islands: 4
- Highest elevation: 13 m (43 ft)

Administration
- Australia
- State: New South Wales
- Largest settlement: Sydney

Demographics
- Population: unpopulated

The Chipping Norton Islands consist of four small lake islands that are found within Chipping Norton Lake. The islands are near Chipping Norton and are located in western Sydney, New South Wales, Australia.

== Geography ==
The islands were once a contiguous area of land on the right bank of the Georges River, and were granted to Thomas Rowley and George Johnston. Much of the land upstream was given to Thomas Moore, an early settler and carpenter for the colony, who established farmland around the river. In the late 1970s, it was decided to flood the sand mine, creating a large lake, while the four islands remained unsubmerged due to their elevation.

The four islets, which belong to different suburbs, include:

- Bass Island - Situated in the west towards Cabramatta
- Bulba-Gong (Wildlife Reserve Island) - Located in the eastern part of the lake within Chipping Norton and is the largest
- Crescent Island - Strip-shaped, located in the northwest part of the lake towards Lansvale
- Daruk Island - Found in the centre of the lake to the east and is the most distant to land, but within the bounds of Chipping Norton

== Description ==
The islands are within Liverpool City Council and Fairfield City Council local government areas. Straddling Georges River, they are mostly made up of native wildlife that serve as a refuge for endemic birds. The islands are accessible by boat, though visitor access is prohibited.

Daruk Island is named after the Darug people, an Aboriginal tribe native to Sydney. “Bulba-gong” means 'island' and 'bird', respectively, in the Eora language.

== Ecology ==
There are over fifty different kinds of birds found around the lake, which would visit or inhabit the islands, such as Australian pelicans, Australasian swamphens, egrets, maned ducks, pacific black ducks, sacred ibis, and pardalote. Dolphin and sharks are usually spotted in the surrounding waters.

The woodlands of the region feature sedgelands, reeds and mangroves. Native trees include the swamp oak, forest red gum, blue box, grey box, bangalay and rough-barked apple. The alluvial woodland vegetation is another striking feature of the lake as it is an endangered ecological community.
