= Moore Lake =

Moore Lake or Lake Moore may refer to:

- Moore Lake (Alberta), a lake in Alberta, Canada
- Lake Moore, New South Wales, a lake in Australia
- Moore Lake (Wright County, Minnesota), a lake in Minnesota
- Moore Reservoir, a lake in New Hampshire and Vermont
