= Red mahogany =

Red mahogany is a common name for several species of plants and may refer to:

- Eucalyptus resinifera, endemic to eastern Australia
- Khaya anthotheca, native to Africa
