= Wattle Grove, New South Wales =

Wattle Grove
- Suburb
- Interactive map of Wattle Grove
- Country: Australia
- State: New South Wales
- City: Sydney
- LGA: City of Liverpool
- Location: 30 km (19 mi) south-west of Sydney CBD
- Established: 1990

Government
  - State electorate: Holsworthy
  - Federal division: Hughes

Area
  - Total: 2.4 km^{2} (0.93 sq mi)
- Elevation: 16 m (52 ft)

Population
  - Total: 8,886 (2021 census)
  - Density: 3,700/km^{2} (9,590/sq mi)
- Postcode: 2173
Suburbs around Wattle Grove
| Moorebank | Moorebank | Hammondville |
| Moorebank | Wattle Grove | Holsworthy |
| Holsworthy Barracks | Holsworthy Barracks | Holsworthy Barracks |

Wattle Grove is a suburb of Sydney, in the state of New South Wales, Australia. Wattle Grove is located 30 kilometres south-west of the Sydney central business district in the local government area of the City of Liverpool.

Wattle Grove is a residential suburb with a small shopping centre and a number of recreational areas such as Wattle Grove Park, Australis Park, Wattle Grove Lake and the surrounding Lakeside Park.

== History ==
Wattle Grove is built on the land of the Tharawal people. It was also previously land occupied by the Australian Defence Force. The original plans for a suburb were made by the government of Prime Minister Gough Whitlam in the 1970s. Infrastructure was built and the suburb lay dormant until further developed by Delfin Property Group, assisted by the Defence Housing Authority in the 1990s.

On 12 April 1991, the Wattle Grove housing area was officially opened by Prime Minister Bob Hawke. In 1992, the suburb's name was changed from Holsworthy Village to Wattle Grove.

== Wattle Grove Lake ==
Wattle Grove Lake
- Location within Sydney
- Location: Wattle Grove, Sydney, Australia
- Coordinates: 33°56′57″S 150°56′26″E
- Type: Reservoir
- Catchment area: Georges River
- Managing agency: Delfin & Liverpool City Council
- Built: 1990
- Islands: 1

Wattle Grove Lake is an artificial lake in the suburb, lying within the Georges River catchment and the Liverpool District sub catchment. It is located 2640 feet (804 metres) from Sydney. It is a migratory birds place of Australia.

Wattle Grove Lake was constructed by Delfin in 1990, along with the surrounding Wattle Grove residential development.

=== Parkland ===
The lake is completely surrounded by Lakeside Park. The parkland includes two play areas and several fitness areas. There is a 15-minute walking trail that surrounds the lake.

=== Wildlife ===
Wattle Grove Lake includes a wildlife reserve, providing home for a variety of water birds. There is a wildlife inaccessible island containing ducks, swans, and other types of birds.

There is a variety of fish that live in the lake, including eels and other marine life.

Fishing, boating, and several other activities concerning the lake are prohibited to protect the wildlife.

== Population ==
According to the 2021 census of Population, there were 8,886 people in Wattle Grove.

- Aboriginal and Torres Strait Islander people made up 2.2% of the population.
- 67.4% of people were born in Australia. The most common countries of birth were India 4.1%, Egypt 3.3%, Philippines 2.0%, China 1.8% and England 1.6%.
- 65.9% of people only spoke English at home. Other languages spoken at home included Arabic 6.7%, Mandarin 2.0%, Hindi 1.6%, Spanish 1.5% and Greek 1.4%.
- The most common responses for religion were Catholic 27.0%, No Religion 24.1%, Anglican 10.6%, Oriental Orthodox 6.0% and Hinduism 5.1%.

== Commercial area ==
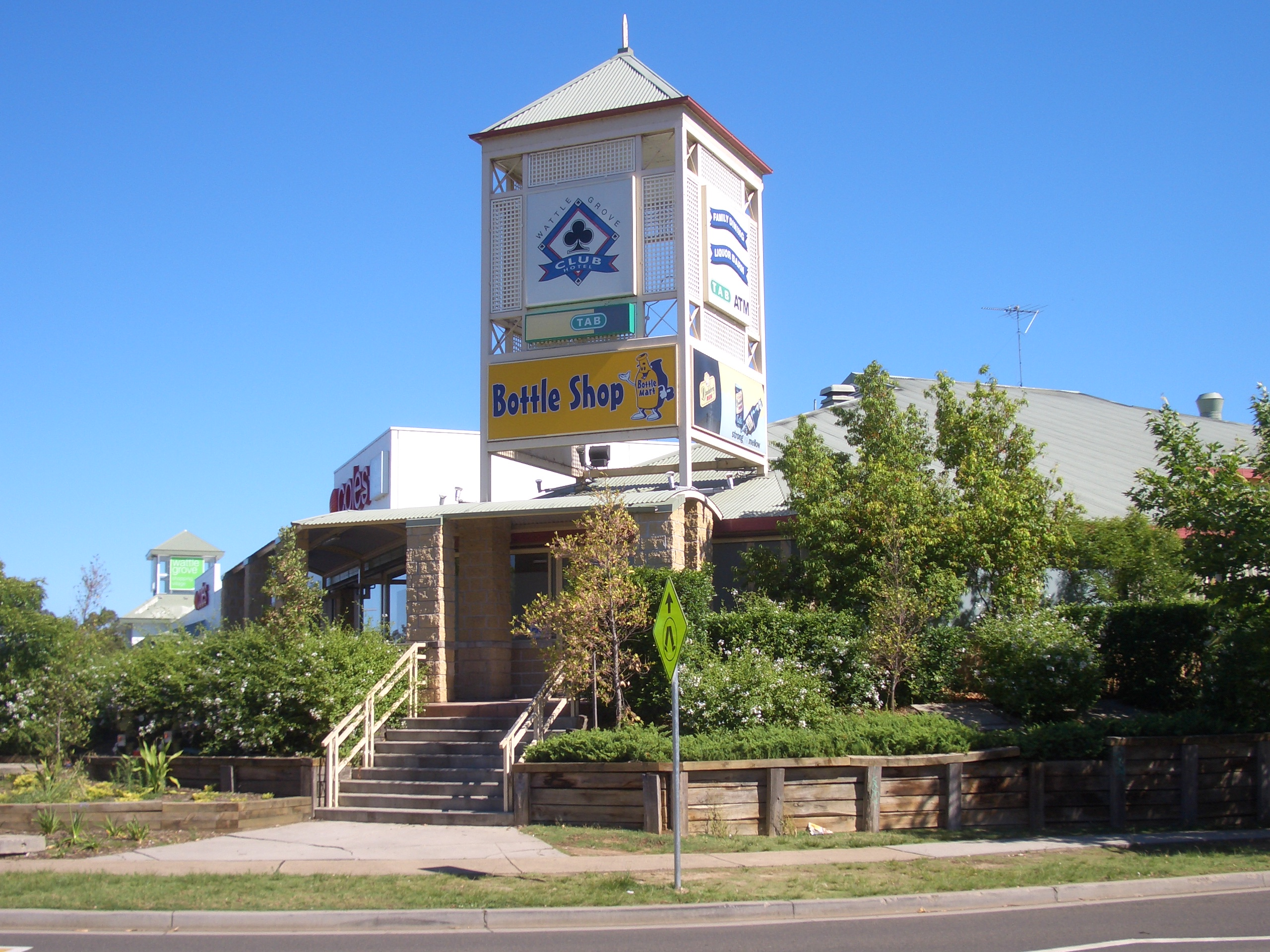
Wattle Grove Pub

Wattle Grove's shopping centre was opened in 1998, but in late 2005 several of the businesses were gutted by fire. The centre reopened in 2007 and includes a Coles supermarket, hairdressing salon, real estate agency, pizzeria, pharmacy, charcoal chicken, news agency and other specialty shops. The Wattle Grove Club Hotel is within the complex.

== Transport ==
Wattle Grove is well connected to other regions of Sydney due to its proximity to the M5 and M7 Motorways. Bus routes 901 and 902, operated by Transit Systems, run within the suburb. Route 901 connects to Holsworthy railway station and Liverpool railway station.

== Culture ==
=== Community ===
The Wattle Grove area was designed to have a strong community 'feel' under the redeveloping of the area by Delfin in the 1990s.

=== Schools ===
Wattle Grove is served by four primary schools: Holsworthy Primary School, Wattle Grove Primary School, St Mark's Coptic Orthodox College and St Christopher's Catholic Primary School, in addition to secondary schools: Holsworthy High School, Moorebank High School and St Mark's Coptic Orthodox College. St Christopher's is a feeder school for All Saints Catholic College Liverpool.

=== Churches ===
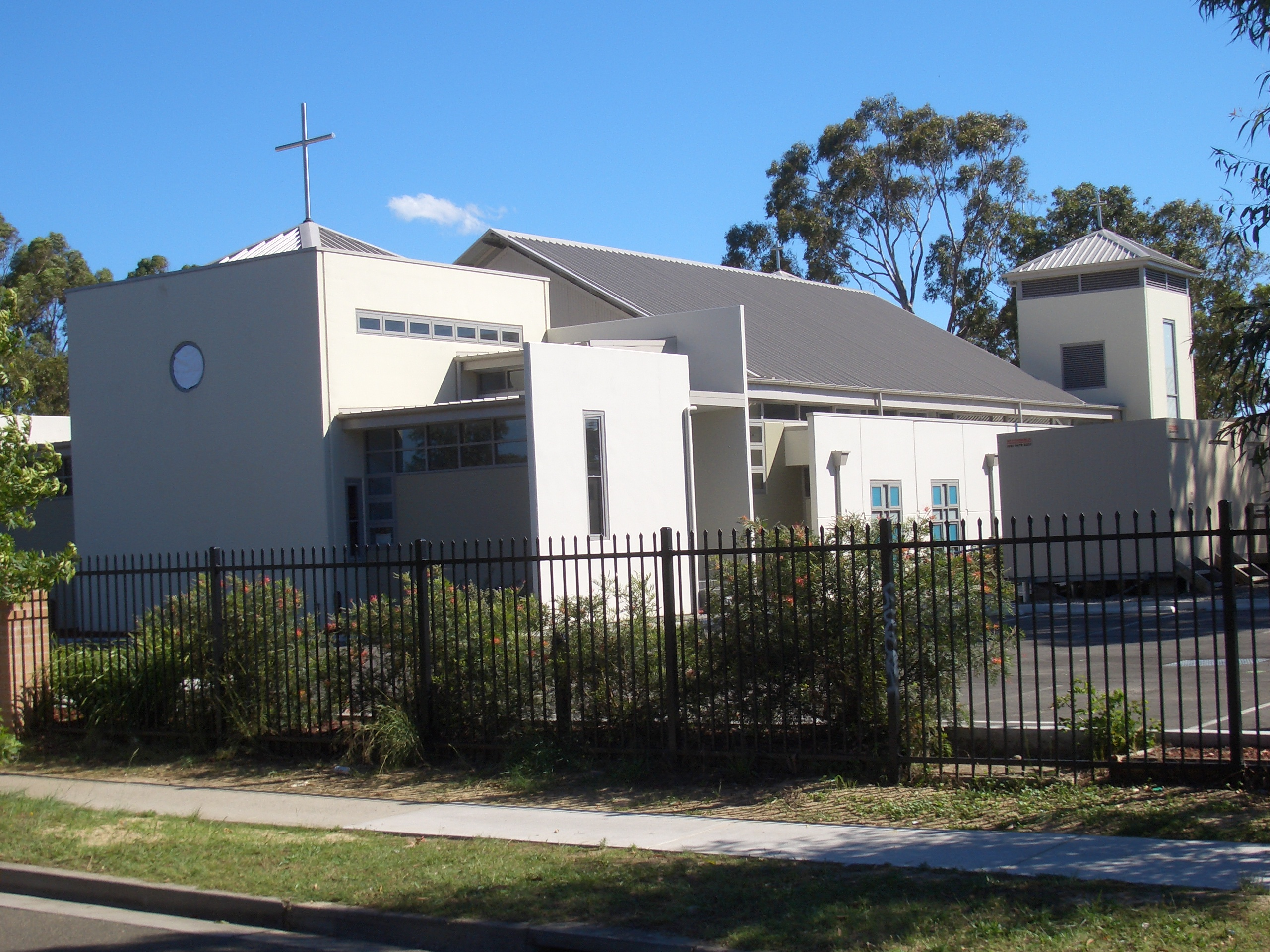
St. Thomas' Indian Orthodox Church

A chapel of the Church of Jesus Christ of Latter-day Saints and St. Thomas' Indian Orthodox Church are located in Wattle Grove.

=== Sport and recreation ===
Playgrounds are located throughout the suburb, as well as walking and bike paths leading to an artificial lake in the suburbs center. Moorebank Sports Club, located nearby, provides opportunities for formal training in rugby league, soccer, hockey, baseball, cricket, Australian rules football, and netball. The Sporting codes are associated with Moorebank Sports Club, all being in the same complex except hockey and AFL which are located in other premises.

Wattle Grove Lake is an artificially constructed lake surrounded by the residential development of Wattle Grove. It is home to a variety of water birds. Anzac Creek is a small stream which leads into Wattle Grove Lake.

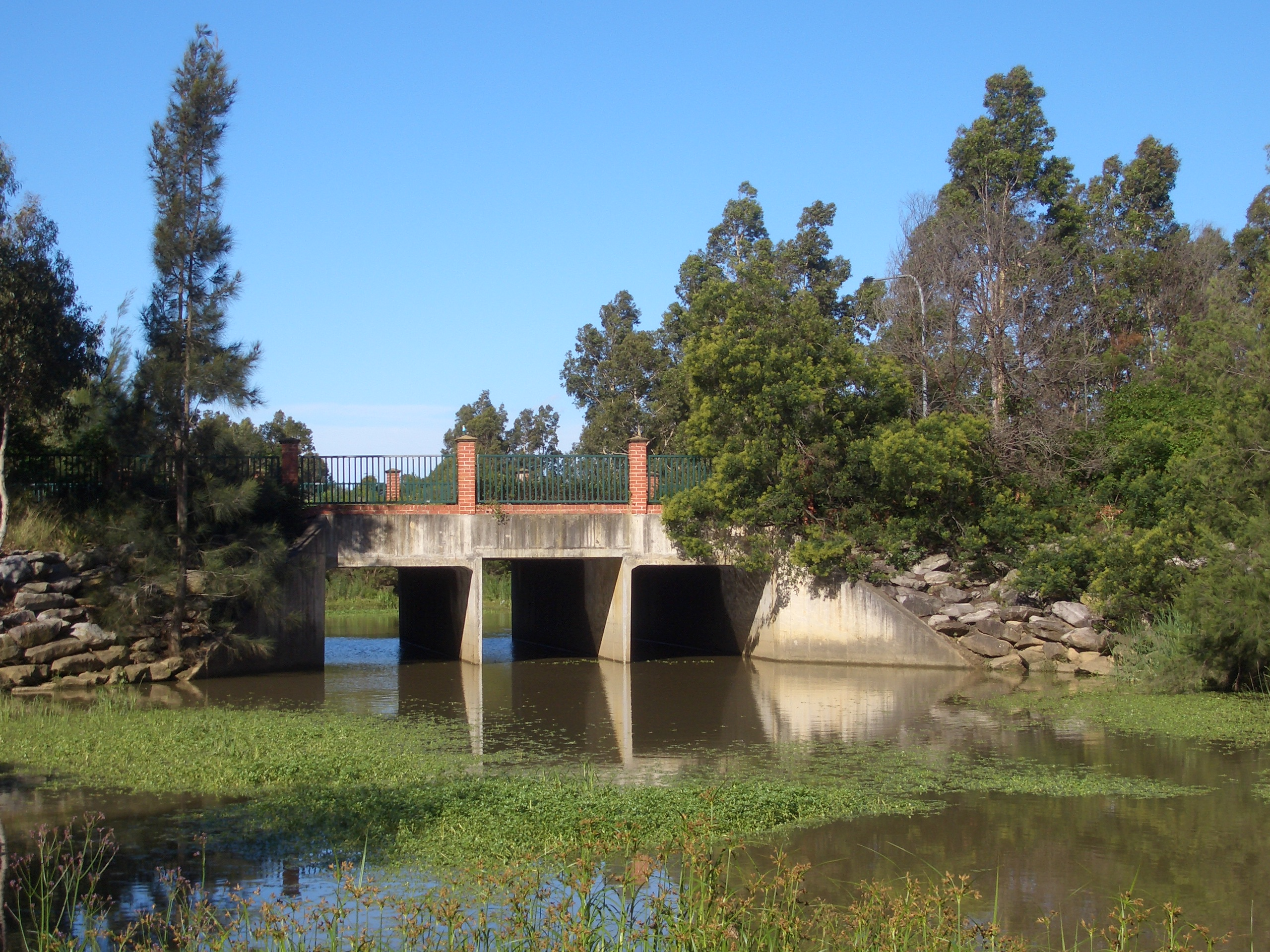
Anzac Creek

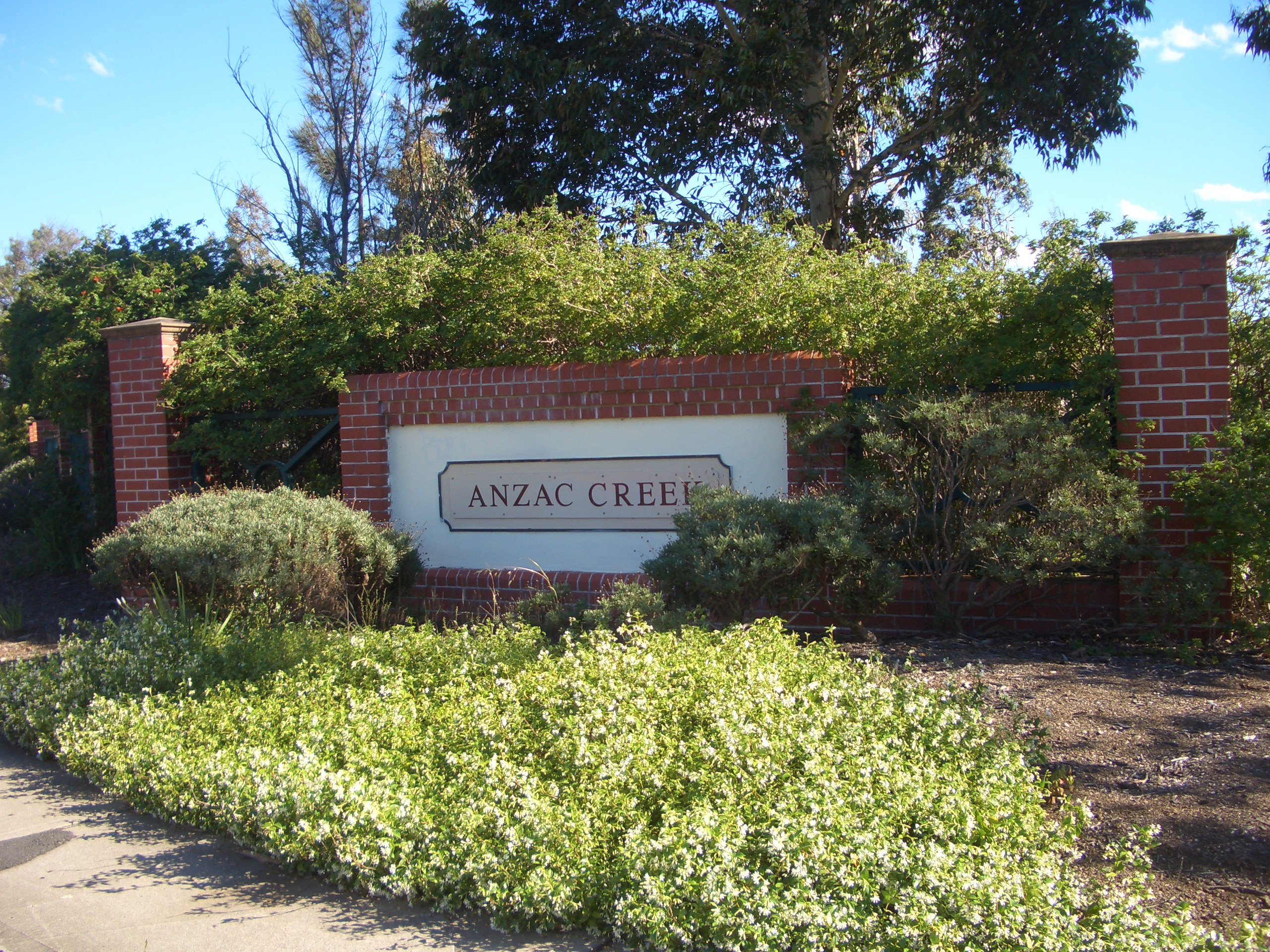
Anzac Creek

== Notable people ==
- Avani Dias (born in 1991), Sri Lankan Australian journalist and radio presenter
