= The Homestead, Chipping Norton =

The Homestead
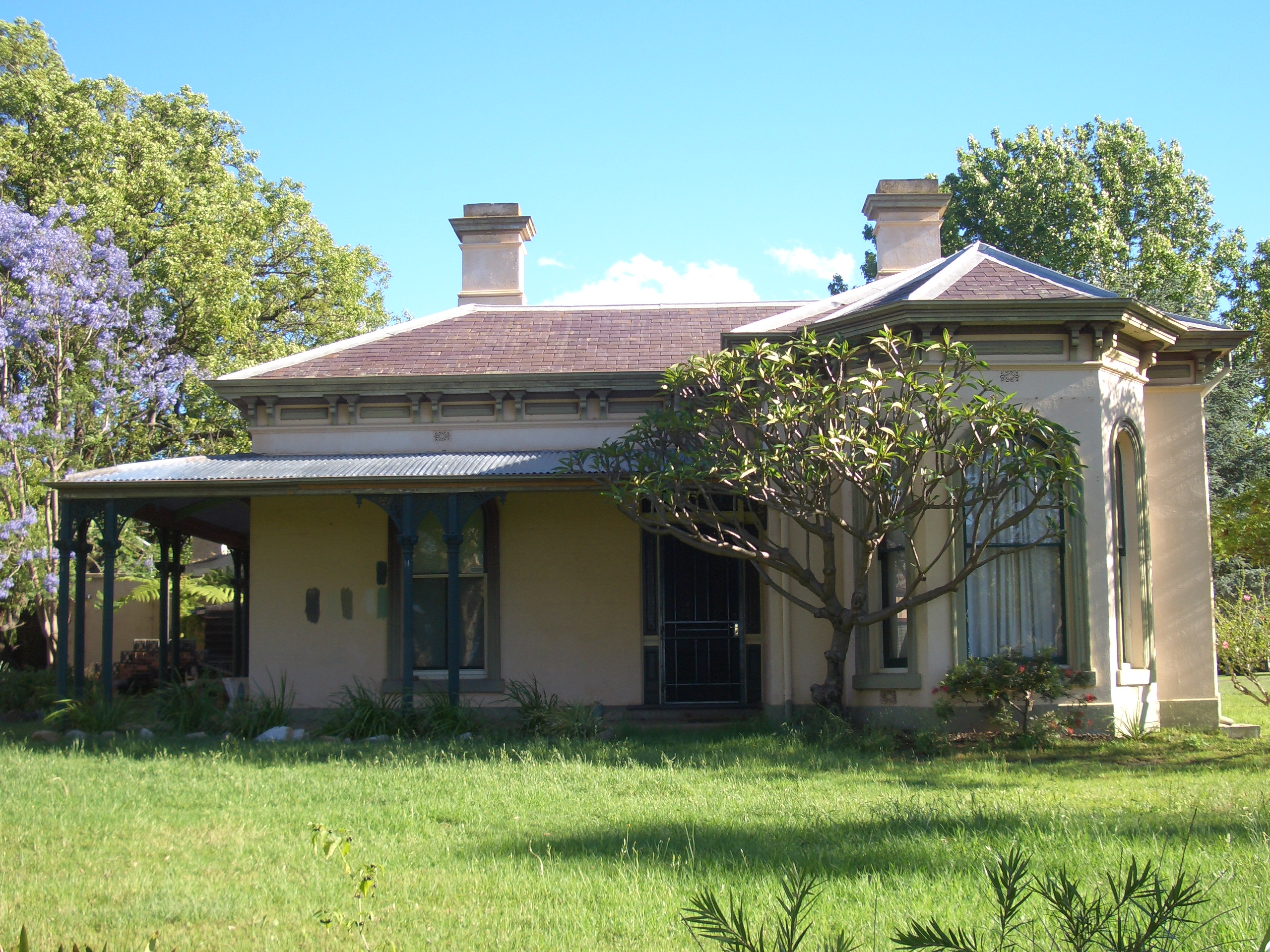

- Location within Sydney Location within Australia
- 33.9063°S 150.9591°E
- Location: Charlton Avenue, Chipping Norton, City of Liverpool, Sydney, New South Wales, Australia

History
- Built: 1884–1893

Site notes
- Owner: Chipping Norton Lakes Authority

New South Wales Heritage Register
- Official name: The Homestead; Chipping Norton Homestead
- Type: state heritage (complex / group)
- Designated: 2 April 1999
- Reference no.: 214
- Type: Homestead building
- Category: Residential buildings (private)

The Homestead is a heritage-listed residence at Charlton Avenue, Chipping Norton, City of Liverpool, Sydney, New South Wales, Australia. It was built from 1884 to 1893. It is also known as Chipping Norton Homestead. The property is owned by the Chipping Norton Lakes Authority. It was added to the New South Wales State Heritage Register on 2 April 1999.

== History ==
Situated near the Georges River north of Moorebank, Chipping Norton was a farming area throughout the 19th century and into the 20th century. It was named after an old English village by William Alexander Long, who was born in Sydney in 1839, went to England to study law, and later lived in Chipping Norton in Oxfordshire. He bought up a number of former land grants in the area at the turn of the century and called his homestead Chipping Norton. The horse stud on part of his property produced many fine young horses. He died in 1915 and the Government of New South Wales bought his estate and subdivided it into farming blocks for soldiers returning from World War I.

The Homestead was built on land that, prior to European settlement, was largely characterised by open eucalypt forest with swamp areas along the river. There are no identified sites of Aboriginal occupation within The Homestead and its near environs. The earliest Europeans to visit the area of modern day Chipping Norton were George Bass and Matthew Flinders, followed by Governor Hunter in 1797. Land grants were made in the area from the late 1790s. The earliest alienation of The Homestead site for European occupation in the late eighteenth century is poorly documented.

One of the first settlers in the area was George Johnston of the New South Wales Corps who received a substantial land grant at the junction of the Georges River and Prospect Creek. Johnston's homestead, George's Hall, was built on a rise overlooking the river. Owing to flooding, a second house was built on the property in the 1830s. Both houses are still extant on the opposite side of the river from The Homestead. Johnston also held land in the area of The Homestead (90 acres). Johnston owned several major properties, including his main property at Annandale, and other holdings at Bankstown, Cabramatta and Lake Illawarra.

Adjoining Johnston's land south of the Georges River, was 85 acres granted to Thomas Rowley, another officer of the NSW Corps, in 1798. Rowley also held land at Bankstown, Petersham, and Liberty Plains (Concord) which was probably his principal residence. Rowley died of consumption in 1806.

On the basis of what is known of Johnston's and Rowley's activities as well as the more general pattern of documented occupation in this period it is unlikely that substantial dwellings were erected on either property. The earliest use of the site, after both grants were cleared, probably was for pasturage and/or agricultural development, grain or hay crops. It is possible that some small huts used by convict workers managing these activities were erected on the properties. There is little or no direct evidence for the use of the specific site of the later area of The Homestead, although the position of the Homestead on a rise above the river makes it a likely potential occupation site in earlier periods.

Rowley's grant passed to Robert Campbell junior by 1822. In 1837 the land was purchased by Samuel Bowler. The use of the site from the 1830s to the 1870s is unknown. It is possible that the land remaining in the Johnston family possession continued to be used in the same manner. Samuel Bowler kept the land for nearly thirty years. This length of time suggests that Bowler was using the property, probably as a farm. In 1865 Bowler sold the former Rowley grant to David Johnston, thus consolidating the two grants at the bend of the Georges River within one family ownership. The Johnston family of The Homestead, Georges Hall retained the land until 1883 when they sold the former Rowley grant to Alfred Smart, who had also acquired the adjoining Johnston grant. Smart sold both properties to William Long in 1884.

The 1890s recession severely affected Long who was forced to mortgage the entire estate by 1899.

The history of the property is then traced following a succession of owners in the early twentieth century to the time when it was associated with the Soldier Settlement Area and subdivided into a series of small farms. At this time block containing The Homestead also had a cottage/office, Bulk Stable with stalls and bails, Coach house and stables, as well as a number of sheds and windmills.

The Homestead was requisitioned for wartime occupation by the military in 1942-43, and became the home of the Fairall family during the 1960s and 1970s. In 1975 The National Trust of Australia (NSW) classified the property for its cultural heritage values.

In 1978, The Homestead was acquired by the NSW Department of Environment and Planning as part of a larger acquisition for the purposes of implementing the Chipping Norton Lakes Scheme. The group was refurbished prior to 1992 with the buildings repaired/restored, the landscape "tidied up" and a picket fence built along the front (northern) boundary. A wishing well "superstructure", constructed of timber with a shingled gable roof and a timber windlass, recorded over the brick cistern in 1992 was removed.

The Homestead was leased as a restaurant and entertainment facility in the early 1990s. The place was added to the surrounding reserve for public recreation in April 1992, when Liverpool City Council as Trust manager for the Reserve became the lessor of the Lease. The lease expired in 1998, at which time Liverpool City Council was reported to be investigating appropriate future uses for The Homestead. As of 2018, the property remains vacant.

== Description ==
The Homestead Group consists of:

1. A late Victorian Italianate style residence of rendered brickwork with attached rear service/accommodation wings,
2. A pair of more recent outbuildings,
3. Remnant planting from earlier landscaping,
4. A small timber garden shed and
5. The site of the former timber stables.

The group is located on level land overlooking the sand mining activities of Lake Moore. The site landscaping comprises areas of grassed lawn scattered in an informal manner with a number of large trees and more recent shrubs and young trees. Early components which remain include pine trees, an olive grove and a number of large peppercorn trees. Interspersed with these, however, are some inappropriate plantings including melaleucas.

=== Homestead ===
The Homestead is a single storey Victorian Italianate residence of stuccoed brickwork with a hipped slate roof and rendered brickwork chimneys. A verandah surrounds two sides of the building, its slightly curved corrugated iron clad roof supported on circular cast iron columns and decorated with cast iron cornered brackets. On the front elevation the verandah abuts a hipped roofed wing and projecting 3 sided bay window. Italianate renderwork decoration includes brackets and raised panels under the eaves and mouldings around the round headed windows. The verandah floor is paved with tessellated tiles and edged with sandstone. The front door has fielded panels with stained glass leadlights above and in the fanlight and side light.

There are five main rooms, each with fireplace surrounds, mostly marble. The door and window joinery and architraves and skirtings were reported as generally intact and in good repair in 1992. Some original plaster ceilings and cornices survived. Others were replaced with pressed metal. Towards the rear of the house is a large room lit by rooflights and paved with tessellated tiles.

=== Grounds ===
The Homestead Group consists of a number of archaeological and early landscape features. The vegetation is a mixture of native and introduced trees, shrubs and grass species. Tree and shrub species include camphor laurels (Cinnamomum camphora), Himalayan cedar (Cedrus deodara), gums (Eucalyptus spp.), silky oaks (Grevillea robusta), jacarandas (Jacaranda mimosifolia), pencil cedar (Juniperus virginiana), oleander (Nerium oleander), African olives (Olea europaea var.africana), Monterey pines (Pinus radiata), Cape honeysuckle/tecoma (Tecomaria capensis and coastal redwood (Sequoia sempervirens).

Two camphor laurels (Cinnamomum camphora), one growing very near to the original kitchen/laundry wing on the south-eastern side of The Homestead, are over 100 years old. There were originally three old camphor laurels close to the house and four overall; however, two were cut down in 2011 as their roots were threatening the integrity of the building's foundations. Other trees nearby include a group of tall fan palms (Washingtonia robusta) and Monterey pines further away (Pinus radiata). Underplantings under the camphor laurels close to The Homestead include ladder ferns (Nephrolepsis sp), Kaffir lilies (Clivia miniata), a tree fern (Cyathea sp.), spider plants (Chlorophytum comosum) and Philodendron villosum. Areas of concrete paving are close to the original kitchen/laundry wing.

The present garden area surrounding the large residence contains a number of archaeological elements. On the north and south side of the house are several features that relate to the former garden layout. This includes an old driveway formation evident in the grass and remnants of former bitumen and concrete paths and garden edges. To the east of the house the remains of a concrete fountain structure are evident, it is now covered by a large wooden cover. To the rear (south) of the building is a circular cistern constructed of brick. The cistern has diameter of c. 2.6m and is 4m deep. Outside the northern boundary of the group is a concrete horse trough that measures 3.2m x 0.85m.

The grounds of the group also contain the archaeological site of the former late 19th century timber stables and coach house. Located south of the rear of the main house the site is marked by a wooden interpretative sign. Foundations of this structure still remain. The foundations are rectangular and displayed within them are a number of old agricultural tools. The signage, which is badly weathered and partly illegible, reads:

"This is the site of the former stables and coach house (north wing) which was erected in 1887 by WA Long the original owner of the Homestead. In the early 1920s the coach house became temporary accommodation for the Chipping Norton School until the Central Ave school was built. The structure consisted of New Zealand weatherboard lining on framing with corrugated iron roofing and concrete floors. Unfortunately the badly deteriorated building collapsed during storms in the early 1990s. Chipping Norton Lake Scheme."

=== Archaeology ===
The Homestead Group consists of a number of archaeological and early landscape features. The present garden area surrounding the large residence contains a number of archaeological elements. On the north and south side of the house are several features that relate to the former garden layout. This includes an old driveway formation evident in the grass and remnants of former bitumen and concrete paths and garden edges. To the east of the house the remains of a concrete fountain structure are evident, it is now covered by a large wooden cover. To the rear (south) of the building is a circular cistern constructed of brick. The cistern has diameter of c.2.6m and is 4m deep. Outside the northern boundary of the group is a concrete horse trough that measures 3.2m x 0.85m.

The grounds of the group also contain the archaeological site of the former late 19th century timber stables and coach house.

== Heritage listing ==
The Homestead was listed on the New South Wales State Heritage Register on 2 April 1999.
