= Chipping Norton Lake =

Lake in New South Wales, Australia

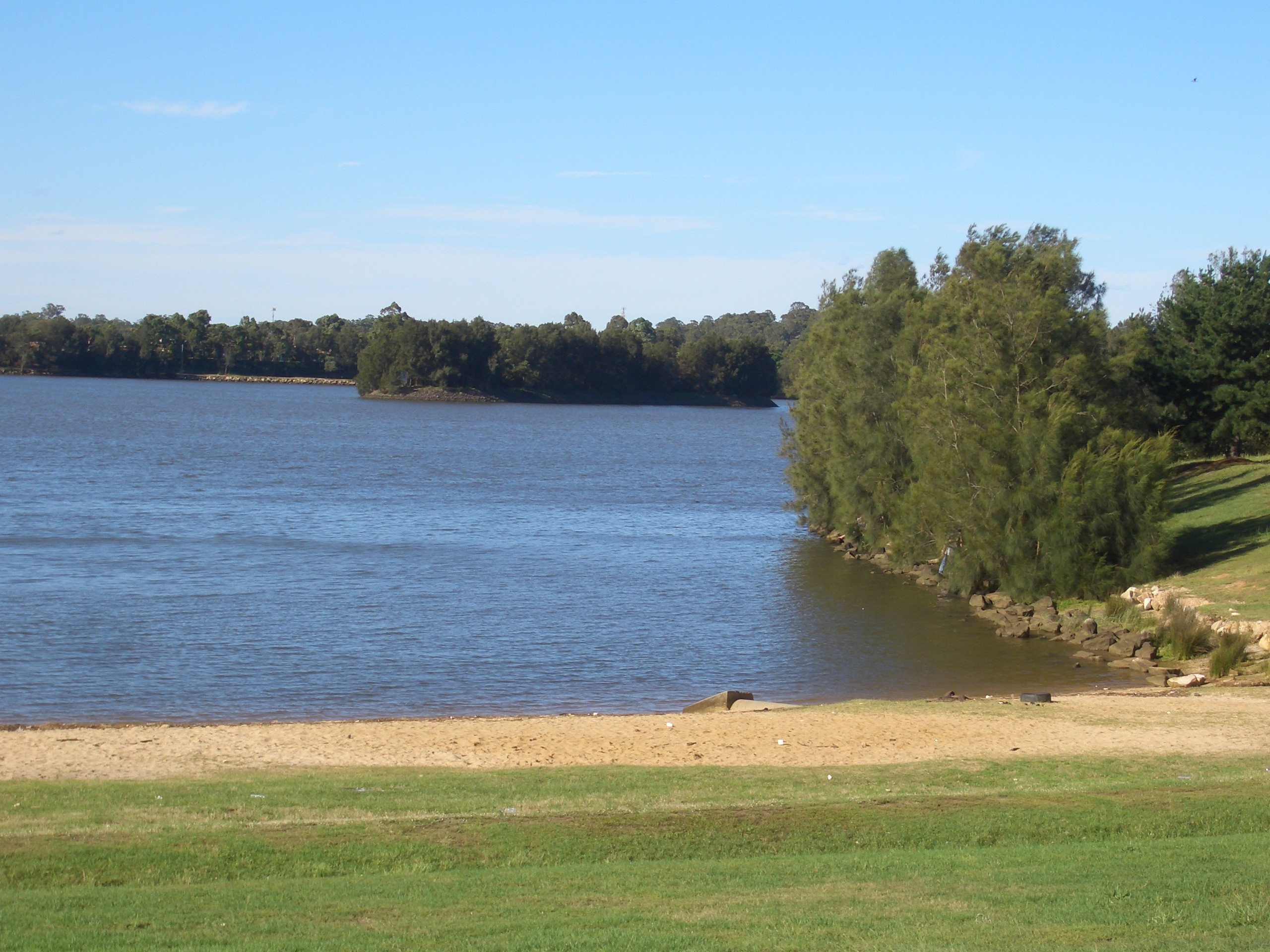
- Chipping Norton Lake

- Location within Sydney
- Location: Chipping Norton, Sydney, New South Wales
- Coordinates: 33°54′S 150°57′E
- Type: Artificial
- Primary inflows: Georges River
- Basin countries: Australia
- Built: c. 1980
- Max. length: 1 km (0.62 mi)
- Surface area: 49 hectares (120 acres)
- Surface elevation: 0 m (0 ft) AHD
- Frozen: never
- Islands: 4
- Settlements: City of Liverpool

Chipping Norton Lake, formerly called Lake Thomas Moore, is a 49-hectare (120-acre) artificial lake and regional park in the Sydney suburb of Chipping Norton, New South Wales, Australia. It is a part of the Georges River system. Chipping Norton Lake is managed by Liverpool City Council. The lake is an important recreational area for Liverpool, City of Canterbury-Bankstown and Fairfield City Council.

== History ==
The Chipping Norton Lake area was inhabited by the Tharawal and Darug people before European settlement. The land where the lake is now situated, on the right bank of the Georges River, was granted to Thomas Rowley and George Johnston, with much of the land upstream given to Thomas Moore, an early settler and carpenter for the colony, who established farmland around the river. In the 1950s, sand mining on the point bar caused irreversible environmental destruction, and the area remained lifeless thereafter. In the late 1970s it was decided to flood the mine, leaving a large lake. Vegetation was planted around the lake to make a wildlife reserve.

== Natural environment ==
There are over fifty different kinds of birds around the lake including pelicans, purple swamphens, egrets, maned ducks, pacific black ducks, sacred ibis, and pardalote; making birdwatching quite popular. The surrounding forests are filled with sedgelands, reeds and mangroves and the other native trees include the swamp oak, forest red gum, blue box, grey box, bangalay and rough barked apple. The alluvial woodland vegetation is another striking feature of the lake as it is an endangered ecological community.

The City of Liverpool, City of Canterbury-Bankstown and the City of Fairfield work together to manage the wildlife refuge and recreation areas of Chipping Norton Lake. There are four islands within the lake that serve as wildlife refuges for native birds and visitor access is prohibited. Bull sharks have been sighted in the lake.

== Recreation ==
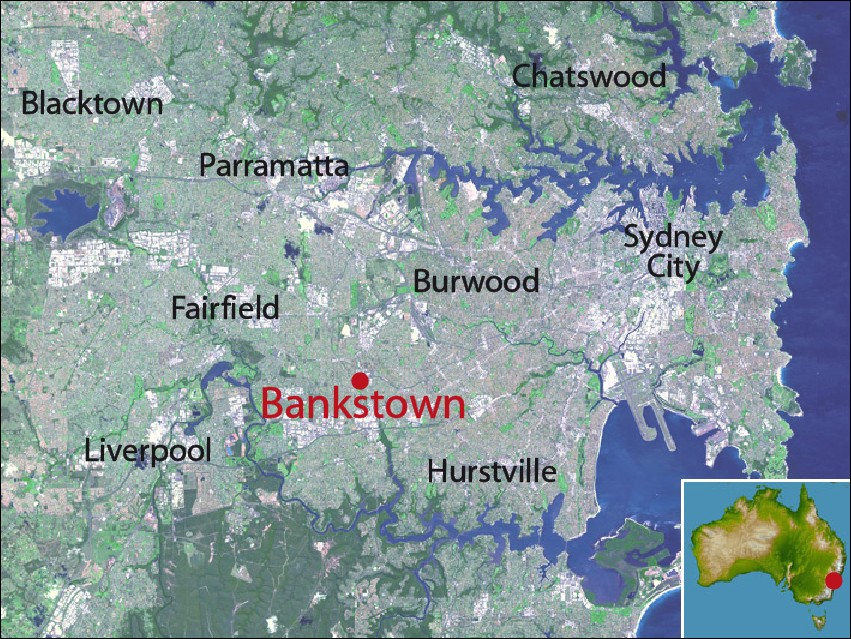
The bean-shaped lake lies just west of Bankstown

Chipping Norton Lake has a regional park located on Homestead Avenue, providing cycleways, barbecue facilities, picnic areas, playground equipment, boat ramps, sporting fields and the Georges River Environment Education Centre. There is also a beach in the lake called Grand Flaneur Beach at Homestead Park. Although swimming is permitted at the beach, it is not recommended because of poor water quality. The Chipping Norton Lake also has a number of walkways.

Watercraft is permitted on Chipping Norton Lake, though a strict speed limit of eight knots applies. The Lake also features a community hall that can be hired by residents or community groups for birthday parties, christenings, barmitzvahs, weddings or any other type of function. The hall can accommodate up to 100 people and has an upstairs balcony with views across the lake and surrounding parkland.

=== Parks ===
The lake is surrounded by a number of parks, recreational areas and/or reserves:

East side:

- Henry Lawson Reserve
- Flinders Slopes
- Lake Gillawarna
- Rowley Park
- Garrison Point Reserve
- Liverpool Golf Club
- Georges River Golf Course

West side:

- Irelands Bridge Reserve
- South Park
- Angle Park
- Homestead Park
- Black Muscat Park
- Heron Park
- Riverside Park

== See also ==
- Bents Basin
- Geography of Sydney
- Lake Parramatta
- List of parks in Sydney
- Prospect Nature Reserve
