= Lake Moore (New South Wales) =

Lake in New South Wales, Australia

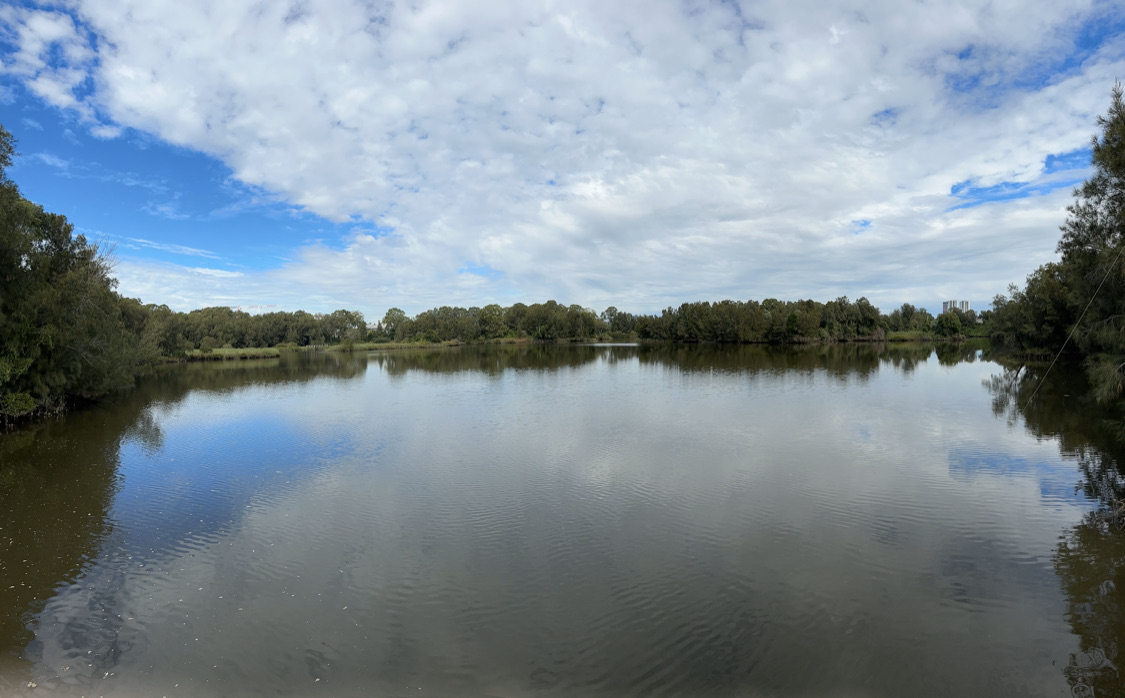
- Lake Moore

- Location within New South Wales
- Location: Moorebank, Chipping Norton
- Coordinates: 33.926°S 150.939°E
- Primary inflows: Georges River
- Basin countries: Australia
- Surface elevation: 0 m (0 ft) AMSL
- Frozen: never
- Settlements: City of Liverpool

Lake Moore is a lake located at Moorebank and Chipping Norton, New South Wales. It is part of the Georges River system. The lake is separated into a northern and southern section. The north half of the lake is artificial, while the south half is natural. The lake also contains several wildlife islands.

== Recreation ==
The Lake Moore Walk starting at Chauvel Park, follows the lake's scenic foreshore to Haigh Park. The 45-minute return trip is approximately 3.2 km and is mainly flat and paved. Watercraft are permitted on Lake Moore however, a strict speed limit of eight knots applies.
