= Moorebank High School =

Location
- Chipping Norton, Sydney, New South Wales; Australia; 33°55′33″S 150°57′30″E

Information
- Type: Government-funded co-educational partially academically selective secondary day school
- Motto: Learn to Live (Discere Vivere)
- Established: 1971; 55 years ago
- Oversight: New South Wales Department of Education
- Principal: Randa Charara
- Years: 7–12
- Enrolment: 1,021 (2024)
- Campus type: Suburban
- Colours: Maroon and white
- Website: moorebank-h.schools.nsw.gov.au

Moorebank High School (MHS) is a government-funded co-educational partially academically selective secondary day school, located in Chipping Norton, a suburb in the Liverpool district of Sydney, New South Wales, Australia. The school was located in Moorebank until suburb borders changed to include the school within the suburb of Chipping Norton.

Established in 1971 and operated by the New South Wales Department of Education, the school currently caters for approximately 1,021 students from Year 7 to Year 12. This is a comprehensive and selective high school.

== History ==
Planning for Moorebank High School began in 1971 to meet the needs of the Moorebank, Hammondville and Chipping Norton growth areas. It wasn't until May 1975 however that the school was ready to be occupied. At the beginning of term, two staff and students moved into the present school premises, with B. T. O'Donnell as the founding School Principal. In June 1985, to coincide with the opening of the school tennis courts, the school was officially opened by the then Minister of Education, Rodney Cavalier.

Over the years Moorebank High has built up a record of academic, sporting, performing arts and student leadership achievement. The school is a leader in the area of technology with five computing laboratories allowing learning programs to be developed for students. School musicals and Expo evenings are a feature of the school. In 2010 Moorebank High School became a partially selective high school.

== Admissions and enrolment ==
Total enrolment in each grade (7–12) is approximately 180 students. Total number of enrolment was 1021 students in 2024.

The school is partially selective, meaning it is divided into selective and comprehensive classes. Those who want to enroll in the comprehensive classes will just enroll normally, like in most other high schools.

Admission into selective classes in Year 7 is determined upon results in a statewide examination known as the Selective High Schools Test. Entry into vacant places in later stages is based on a reserve list and other criteria, mainly reports from previous years. The school also has a Support Unit through which students with Autism Spectrum Disorder receive extra support and lessons designed to equip them for active participation in the wider community upon graduation. These students are also encouraged to take part in all aspects of school life and are an integral part of the school community.

== Facilities ==
School facilities include six laboratories, three industrial kitchens, two wood-work studios, two metal-work studios, a recording studio, a photographic darkroom, a dual-library, a football field, a cricket field, two cricket nets, two basketball courts, three tennis courts, six outdoor table tennis tables, a dance studio, and an indoor multiplex hall with staging.

== Controversies ==
Fingerprint Scanning: In September 2022, Moorebank High School had installed fingerprint scanners outside of toilets to combat vandalism. However, parents and students were outraged, having concerns about privacy and data leaks. Moorebank High School has since removed the need to access the toilets with fingerprints and now use a new system.

== See also ==
- List of government schools in New South Wales
- List of selective high schools in New South Wales
