= Moore Lake (Wright County, Minnesota) =

Lake in the state of Minnesota, United States

- Location within Minnesota
- Location: Wright County, Minnesota
- Coordinates: 45°8′55″N 93°45′56″W
- Type: lake

Moore Lake is a lake in Wright County, in the U.S. state of Minnesota.

Moore Lake was named for an early settler.

== See also ==
- List of lakes in Minnesota
