= Chipping Norton, New South Wales =

Chipping Norton
- Suburb
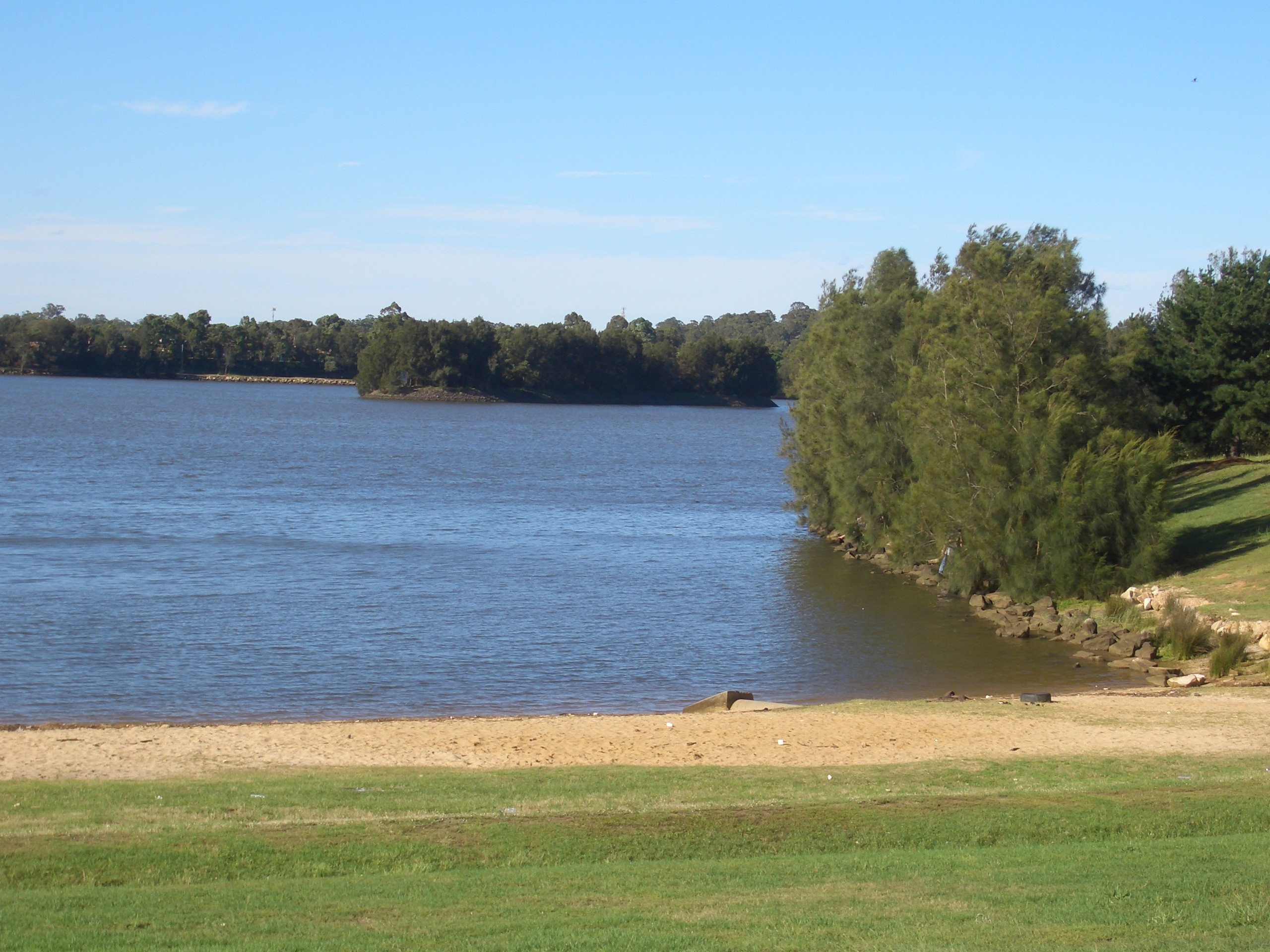
- Chipping Norton Lake

- Interactive map of Chipping Norton
- Country: Australia
- State: New South Wales
- City: Sydney
- LGA: City of Liverpool
- Location: 27 km (17 mi) south-west of Sydney CBD

Government
  - State electorate: Holsworthy
  - Federal division: Fowler
- Elevation: 8 m (26 ft)

Population
  - Total: 9,412 (2021 census)
- Postcode: 2170
Suburbs around Chipping Norton
Warwick Farm	Lansvale	Georges Hall
Warwick Farm	Chipping Norton	Bankstown Aerodrome
Liverpool	Moorebank	Milperra

Chipping Norton is a suburb of Sydney, in the state of New South Wales, Australia. Chipping Norton is 27 kilometres south-west of the Sydney central business district, in the local government area of the City of Liverpool and is part of the South Western Sydney region.

== History ==
=== Aboriginal culture ===
There are two traditional custodians of the Chipping Norton Lake area – the Tharawal people, which inhabited the southern side of the Georges River, and the Darug people to the north and west of the River.

=== European settlement ===
Chipping Norton was a farming area throughout the nineteenth and early twentieth centuries, named after an old English town by William Alexander Long. Long was born in Sydney in 1839, and travelled to England to study law, and later lived in Chipping Norton (Oxfordshire). He bought up a number of former land grants in the area at the turn of the twentieth century and his homestead 'Chipping Norton'. The horse stud on part of his property produced many fine young horses. He died in 1915 and in 1919 the government bought his estate and subdivided it into farming blocks for soldiers returning from the First World War.

Thomas Moore, another prominent early settler, was granted waterfront land that is now part of the park. 'The Homestead' within the reserve grounds was built in the 1880s. Chipping Norton Post Office opened on 1 September 1920 and closed in 1974.

As farming activities declined, the rich topsoil and underlying sand was mined. After 20 years of mining, the riverbanks were packed with dangerous pits and eroded banks. In 1977 the Chipping Norton Lakes Authority was set up to rehabilitate the area into parkland.

== Heritage listings ==
Chipping Norton has a heritage-listed site:

- Charlton Avenue: The Homestead
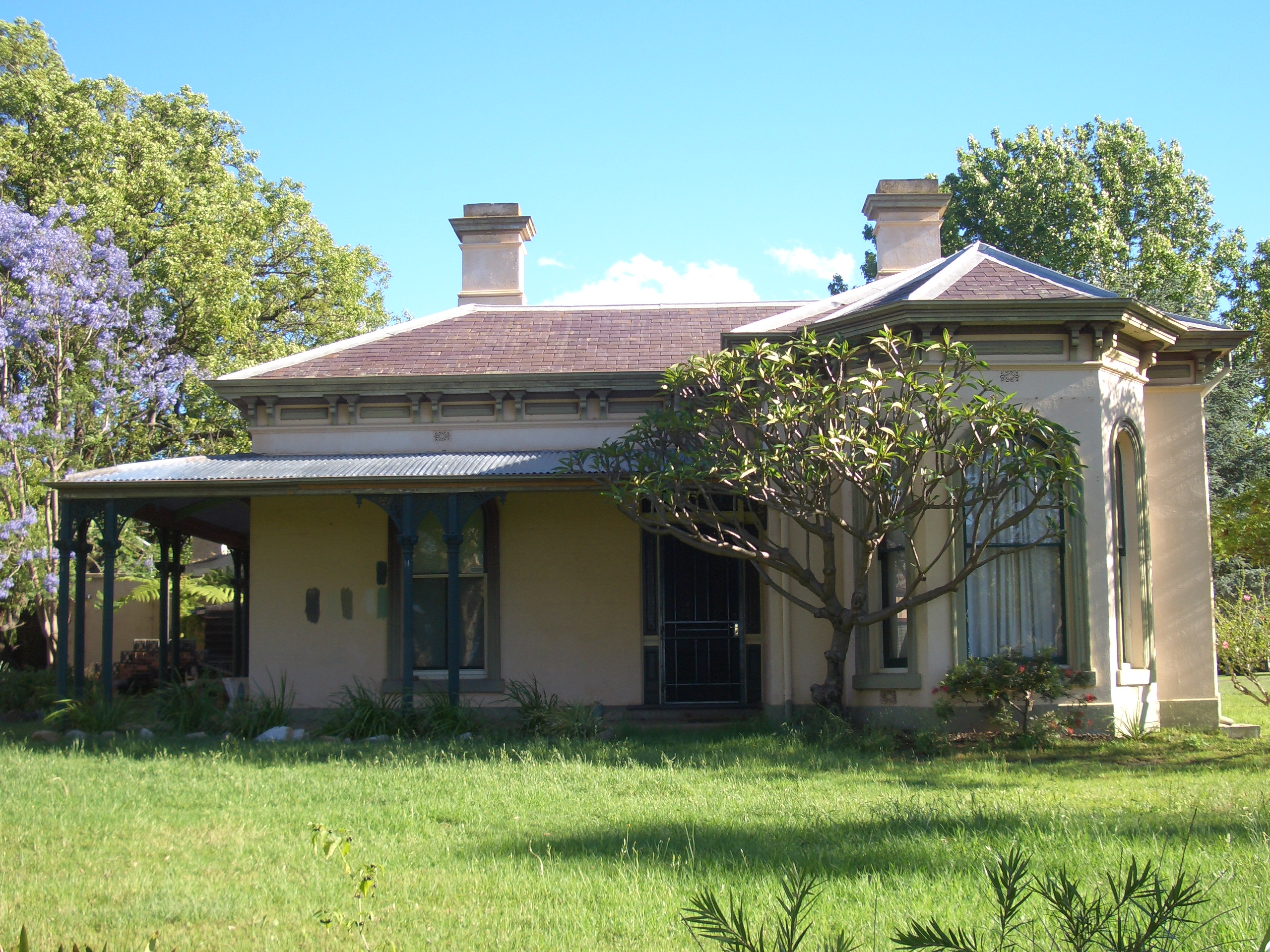
The Homestead

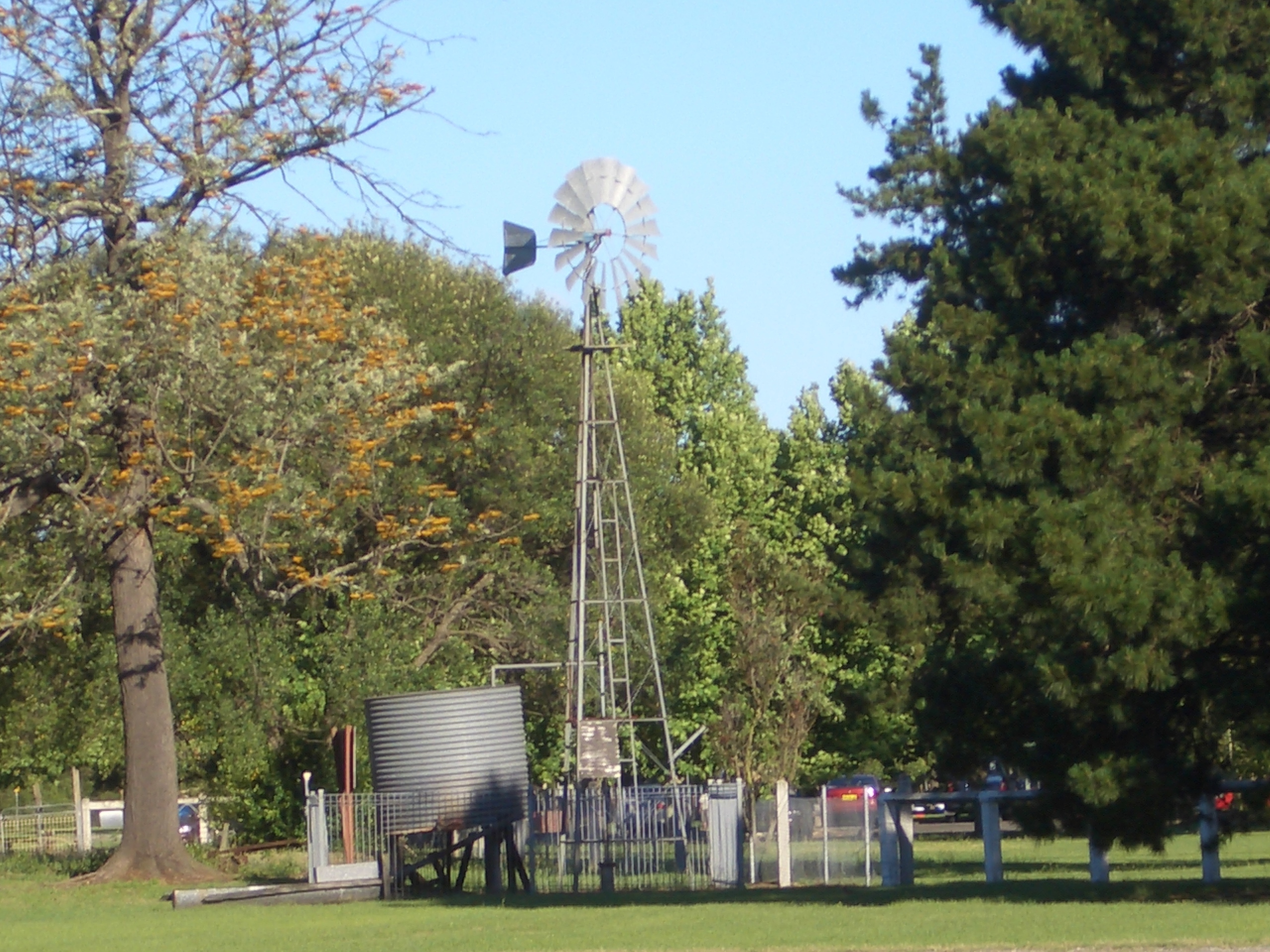
The Homestead windmill

== Population ==
At the 2021 census, Chipping Norton had a population of 9,412 people. The most common ancestries were Australian (20.7%), English (16.4%), Lebanese (9.9%), Vietnamese (8.1%) and Italian (8.0%). 62.6% of people were born in Australia; the next most common countries of birth were Vietnam 5.3%, Lebanon 3.4%, Italy 2.1%, China 1.7%, and Greece 1.4%. 52.9% of people only spoke English at home, compared to the national average of 72.0%, with other languages including Arabic (11.1%), Vietnamese (7.8%), Greek (5.0%), Italian (2.5%) and Mandarin (1.8%). The most common responses for religion were Catholic 30.2%, No Religion 17.1%, Islam 11.3% and Eastern Orthodox 10.4%.

== Sport and recreation ==
Chipping Norton Lake and Lake Moore are the main recreational centres of Chipping Norton. They feature parks, walkways, barbecues and scenery. There are many other parks across the suburb.

== Schools ==
Chipping Norton has four schools. They are Chipping Norton Public School, Newbridge Heights Public School, Moorebank High School and St Joseph's Catholic School.
