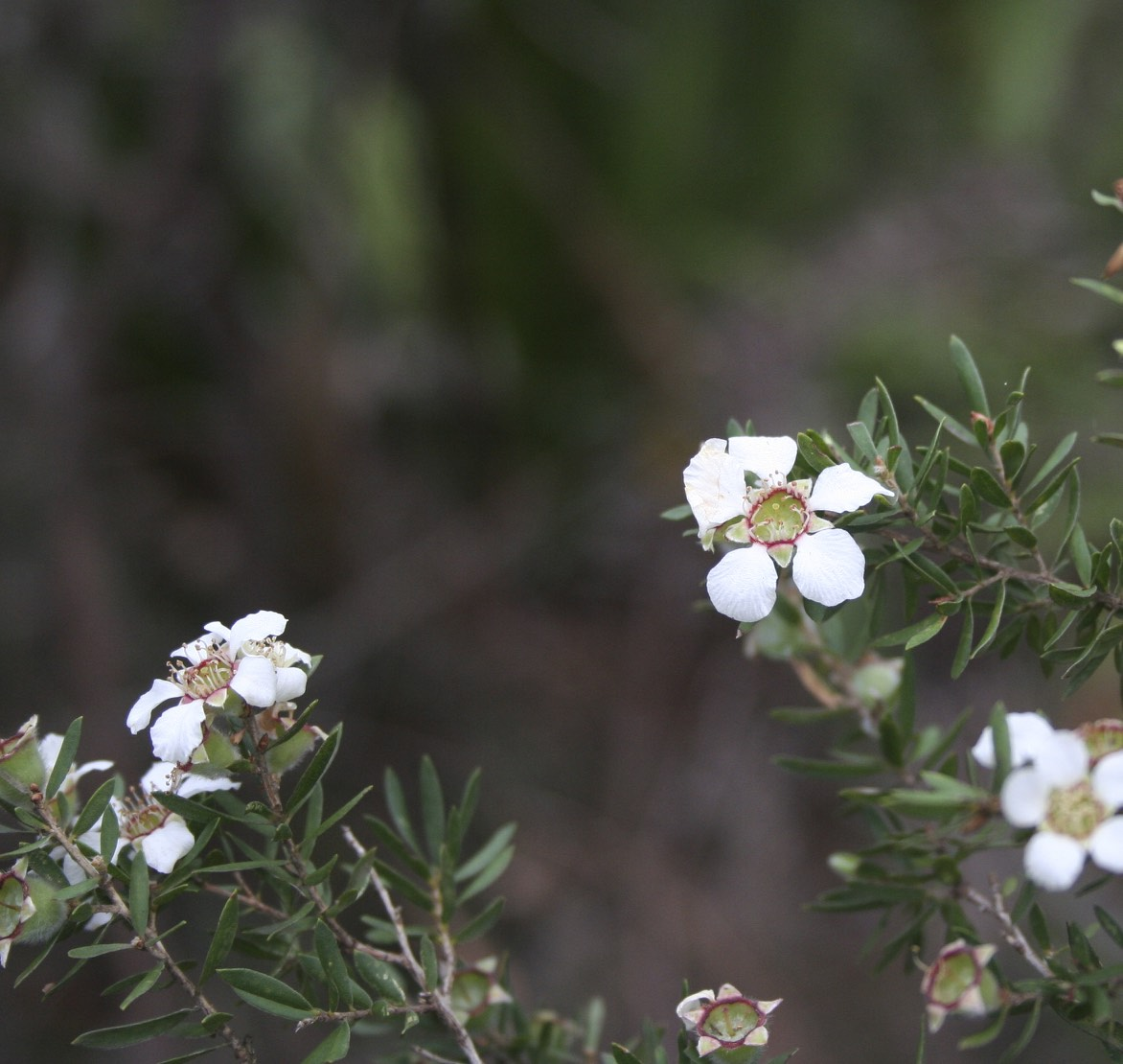
- At Somersby

Scientific classification
- Kingdom: Plantae
- Clade: Tracheophytes
- Clade: Angiosperms
- Clade: Eudicots
- Clade: Rosids
- Order: Myrtales
- Family: Myrtaceae
- Genus: Leptospermum
- Species: L. juniperinum

Binomial name
- Leptospermum juniperinum Sm.
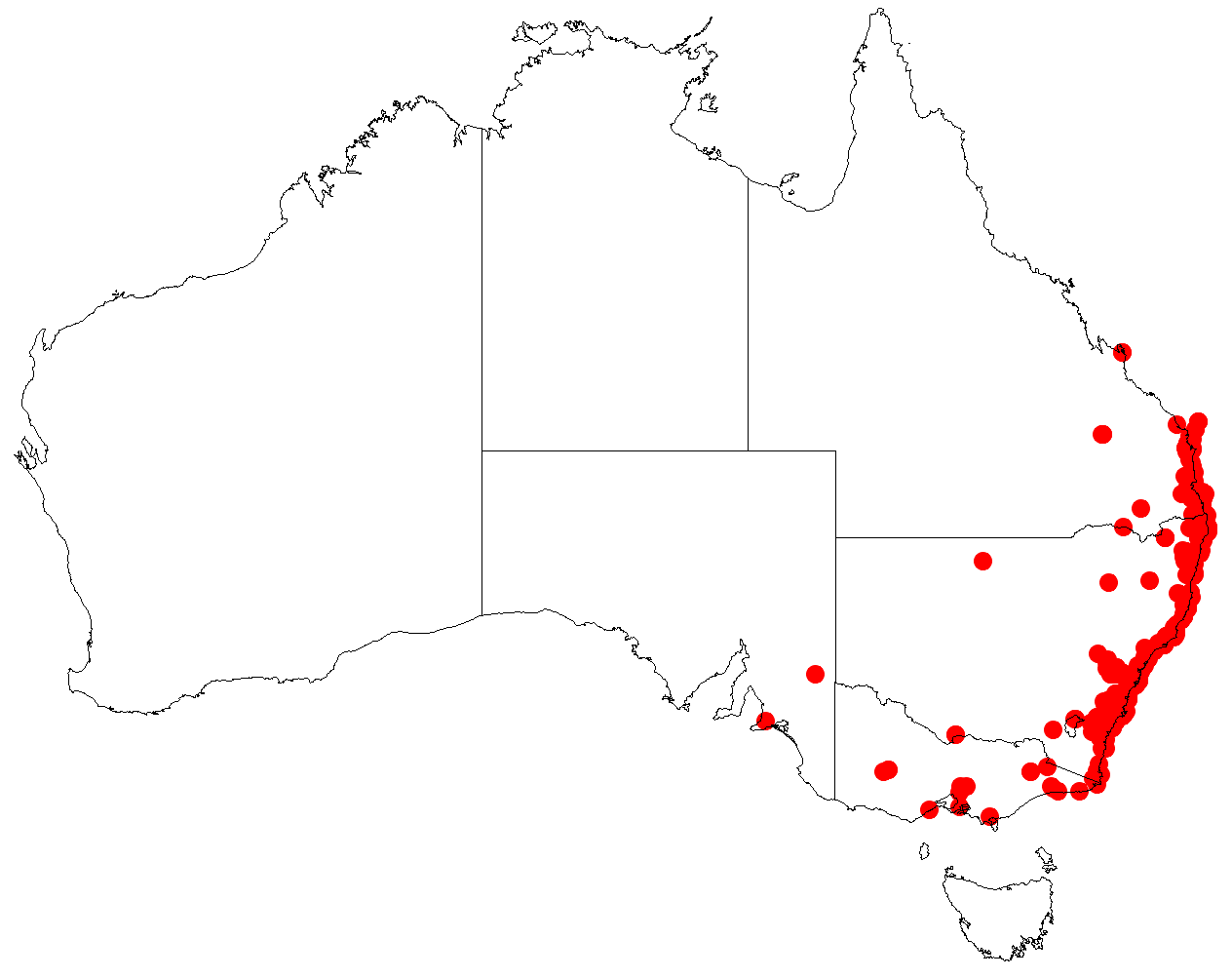
- Occurrence data from AVH

= Leptospermum juniperinum =

Prickly tea-tree

Species of plant

Leptospermum juniperinum, commonly known as the prickly tea tree, is a species of broom-like shrub that is endemic to eastern Australia. It has narrow, sharply pointed leaves, white flowers usually arranged singly on short side shoots and small fruit that remain on the plant when mature.

== Description ==
Leptospermum juniperinum is a broom-like shrub that typically grows to a height of 2–3 m (6 ft 7 in – 9 ft 10 in) and has thin, rough bark. The leaves are narrow elliptical or narrow lance-shaped, 5–15 mm (0.20–0.59 in) long and 1–2 mm (0.039–0.079 in) wide with a sharply pointed tip. The flowers are usually borne singly on short side shoots and are 6–10 mm (0.24–0.39 in) wide on a pedicel less than 1 mm (0.039 in) long. The floral cup is 1.5–2 mm (0.059–0.079 in) long, the sepals broadly egg-shaped and about 1.6 mm (0.063 in) long, the petals often about 3.5 mm (0.14 in) long and the stamens 1–1.5 mm (0.039–0.059 in) long. Flowering mostly occurs from November to December and the fruit is a capsule usually less than 7 mm (0.28 in) wide and that is not shed when mature.

== Taxonomy ==
Leptospermum juniperinum was first formally described in 1797 by James Edward Smith in Transactions of the Linnean Society of London. The specific epithet is a reference to a perceived similarity to Junipers.

== Distribution and habitat ==
Prickly tea-tree grows in near-coastal swamps, heath and sedgeland and on sandstone cliffs between Fraser Island in Queensland and Ulladulla in New South Wales.
