= Moorebank =

Suburb of Sydney, New South Wales, Australia

- Suburb
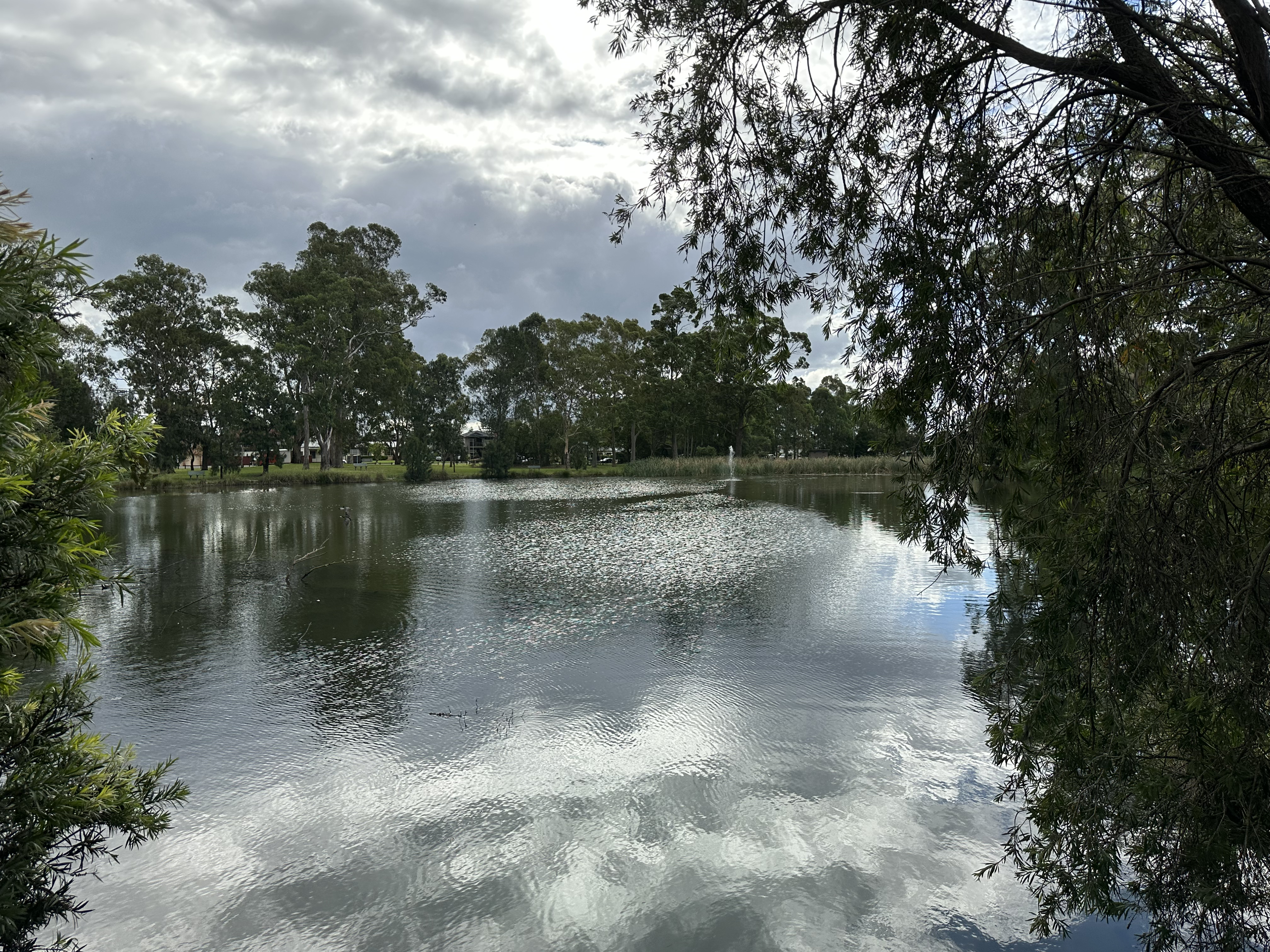
- Clinches Pond

- Interactive map of Moorebank
- Country: Australia
- State: New South Wales
- City: Sydney
- LGA: City of Liverpool
- Location: 27 km (17 mi) south-west of Sydney CBD

Government
  - State electorate: Holsworthy
  - Federal division: Hughes
- Elevation: 20 m (66 ft)

Population
  - Total: 11,408 (2021 census)
- Postcode: 2170, 1875 (Post Boxes)
Suburbs around Moorebank
Liverpool	Warwick Farm	Chipping Norton
Casula	Moorebank	Holsworthy
Holsworthy	Wattle Grove	Hammondville

Moorebank is a suburb of Sydney, in the state of New South Wales, Australia. Moorebank is located 27 kilometres south-west of the Sydney central business district in the local government area of the City of Liverpool.

Moorebank features a mix of residential and industrial areas. Moorebank Shopping Village is a small shopping centre located in the suburb.

== History ==
The suburb takes its name from early settler Thomas Moore. Moorebank was originally home to vineyards and other rural activities. Nuwarra Public School opened in 1973 and is located directly opposite Moorebank shopping centre, which also opened in the early 1970s. Moorebank is built atop a plateau and was cut off from surrounding areas in the floods of 1986.

== Transport ==
The M5 Motorway links Moorebank east to the Sydney central business district and west to Campbelltown. Moorebank is close to Liverpool railway station on the Leppington & Inner West Line, Liverpool & Inner West Line and Cumberland Line of the Sydney Trains network.

Moorebank is the site of the proposed Moorebank Intermodal Terminal.

== Schools ==
- Nuwarra Public School

Note: Moorebank High School, Newbridge Heights Public School and St Josephs Primary are now in the adjacent suburb of Chipping Norton, due to a suburb border change.

== Churches ==
Moorebank has several churches for the suburb

- St Thomas (Anglican)
- St Joseph (Catholic)
- Freedom City Church

== Sport and recreation ==
Moorebank is home to a number of local sporting teams, most of which use Hammondville Park as their home ground. The most prominent is Moorebank Hawks Soccer Club which has over 1000 registered players in the Southern Districts Football Association. The Moorebank Magpies Australian Football team plays in the second division of the Sydney AFL competition. The Moorebank Rams rugby league team plays in the Canterbury-Bankstown Junior Rugby League competition but have previously fielded teams in the Metropolitan Cup, the most senior Sydney competition beneath the National Rugby League. Moorebank also fields a cricket team in the Fairfield-Liverpool Cricket Association, a baseball team (the Royals) in the Bankstown District Baseball Association and also has netball and fishing clubs. Moorebank/Liverpool District Hockey Club operates out of Ernie Smith Reserve with 3 international standard water based turfs and is one of the most successful clubs in Sydney.

Moorebank is also home to a purpose-built remote control car race track. The John Grant International Raceway is located in Helles Reserve which is just off Helles Avenue, near the Moorebank Road and M5 intersection. The racetrack is run by the New South Wales Remote Control Race Car Club Incorporated, a not-for-profit club, and was host to the 2001 IFMAR World Championships for 8th scale racing which saw the world's best 8th scale racers attend this event.

Also situated in Helles Reserve, on the Georges River, is the NSW Barefoot Waterski Club. The site is considered one of the best in the World with consistent pristine water conditions. NSWBWSC has hosted many World Championships, National Championships, State Titles and Club Tournaments. Growth and development of first time barefooters and nurturing of junior members is key to the club's goal and purpose.

Moorebank has a small lake called Clinches Pond. It is surrounded by a park called Clinches Pond Reserve.

== Population ==
=== Demographics ===
According to the 2021 census, Moorebank was home to 11,408 people. 63.0% of people were born in Australia. The next most common countries of birth were Vietnam 3.3%, India 2.7%, Lebanon 2.2%, Fiji 1.9% and Philippines 1.7%. 53.4% of people spoke only English at home. Other languages spoken at home included Arabic 10.1%, Vietnamese 5.2%, Greek 4.2%, Hindi 2.0% and Mandarin 2.0%. The most common responses for religion in Moorebank were Catholic 29.2%, No Religion 17.1%, Islam 9.6%, Eastern Orthodox 9.2% and Anglican 8.3%.

The average age was 36 compared to 38 for the country as a whole and the median household income was $2,201 per week compared to a national figure of $1,746. The average housing loan repayments in Moorebank ($2,500 per month) are above national average ($1,863.)

=== Notable residents ===
- Robert Kaleski (1877–1961), bushman and dog expert.
- Harley Matthews (1889–1968), vigneron, soldier and author of four books about his experiences at Gallipoli.
- Thomas Moore (1762–1840), explorer and first British settler of Moorebank.
- Robert Braiden (1971), film writer and director.

== Gallery ==
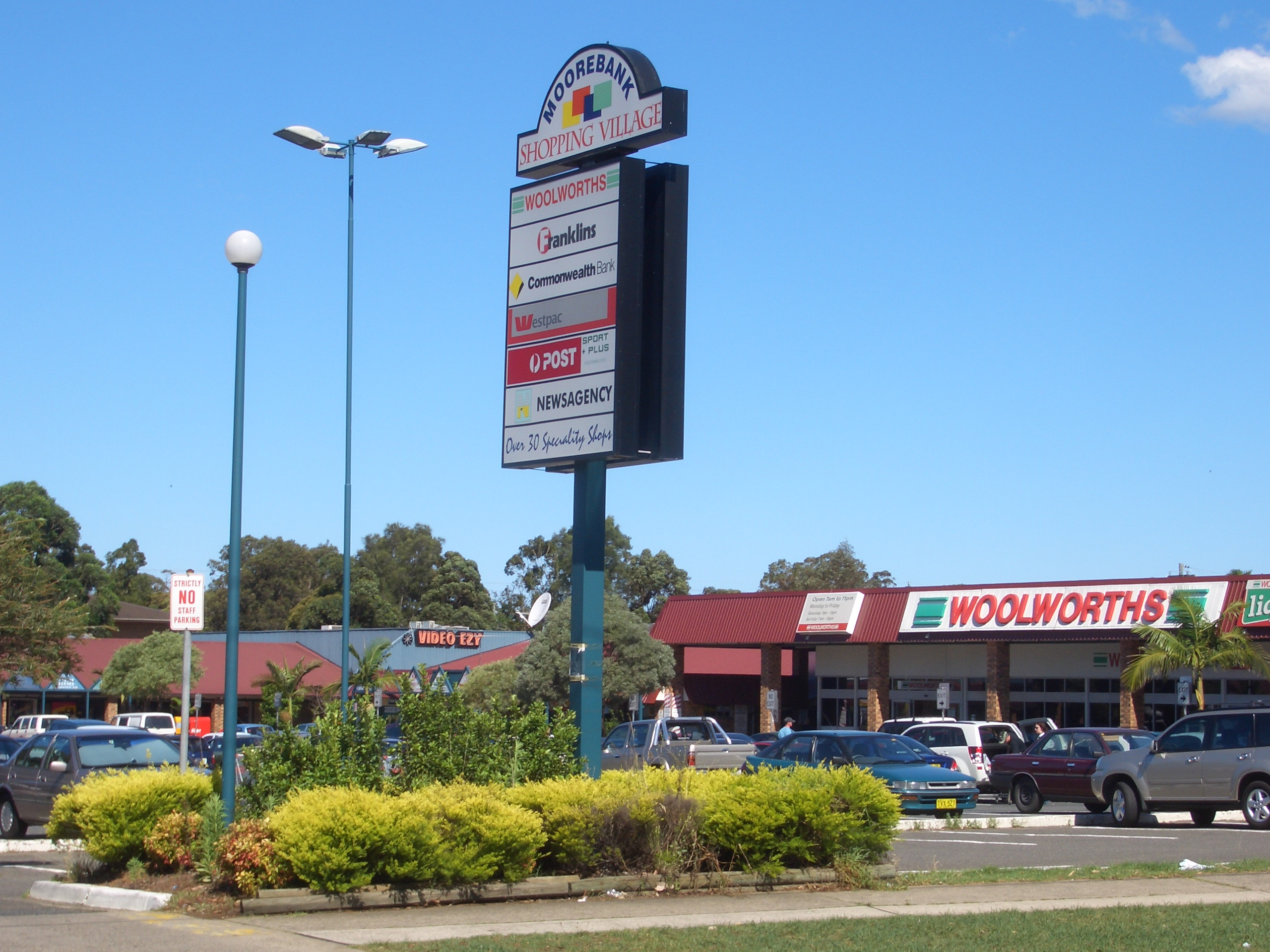
Moorebank shopping centre in 2007
