= Tapp (surname) =

Tapp is a surname with multiple convergent origins. In England, Tapp was used as a given name, from the Old English name Tæppa, and became a surname in relation to it. Alternatively, also in England, some instances of the surname Tapp have occurred as the result of abbreviation of various surnames beginning in "Tap-". Additionally, in England and Scotland, the surname Tapp arose as a variant of the surname Topp. Another additional proposed potential English origin for some instances of the surname is as a nickname from the Middle English words tape meaning ribbon or tape or tappe meaning to plug, tap, or knock. The surname also has separate German origins. It may have arisen as an occupational surname for a wine tapper at a tavern. It can also be from a shortening of ancient Germanic name Theudobrand, roughly meaning "people of the sword". Another origin for the surname is as a nickname, from northern Germany, for a clumsy or simple-minded person, from the Middle Low German word tappe meaning "oaf".

Notable people with the surname include:

- Alex Tapp (born 1982), English footballer
- Alistair Tapp (born 1964), English cricketer
- Harrison Tapp (born 2006), English Musician
- Bill Tapp (1929–1992), Australian cattleman
- Brad Tapp (born 2001), Australian soccer player
- Colton Tapp, American actor, model and musician
- David A. Tapp (born 1962), American judge from Kentucky
- Darryl Tapp (born 1984), American football player
- Emily Tapp (born 1991), Australian wheelchair paralympic athlete
- Finley Tapp (born 1999), English television personality
- Frank Tapp (1883–1953), English composer, pianist and conductor
- Gary Tapp (born 1953), American politician from Kentucky
- Gordie Tapp (1922–2016), Canadian singer
- Hannah Tapp (born 1995), American volleyball player
- Ian Tapp, English sound engineer
- Jake Tapp (born 1988), Canadian swimmer
- James Tapp Jr. (1977–2003), American rapper under the stage name Soulja Slim
- James B. Tapp (1920–2014), American flying ace of World War II
- Jay Tapp, Canadian swimmer
- Jimmy Tapp (1918–2004), Canadian radio personality
- John Tapp (fl.1596–1615), English writer on navigation
- Johnny Tapp (born 1941), Australian racecaller
- Mike Tapp, British soldier and politician
- Margaret and Seana Tapp, Australian murder victims
- Nigel Tapp (1904–1991), British Army general
- Paige Tapp, now Paige Sander (born 1995), American volleyball player
- Russell Tapp (1943–2010), British luger
- Theodore Tapp (1883–1917), English cricketer and British Army officer

== Fictional characters ==
- David Tapp, character from the Saw franchise

== See also ==
- Tappe, a related surname
