= TOPP =

TOPP or topp may refer to:

- Topp (surname)
- Topp Twins New Zealand/Aotearoa folk singing & comedic twins.
- Tagging of Pacific Predators, a project by Census of Marine Life
- The OpenMS Proteomics Pipeline, a set of computational tools to solve HPLC-MS data pipeline analysis problem
- ToppGirl, a Norwegian magazine formerly known as Topp

== See also ==
- TOP (disambiguation)
- Topps
