= Kirkham Stables =

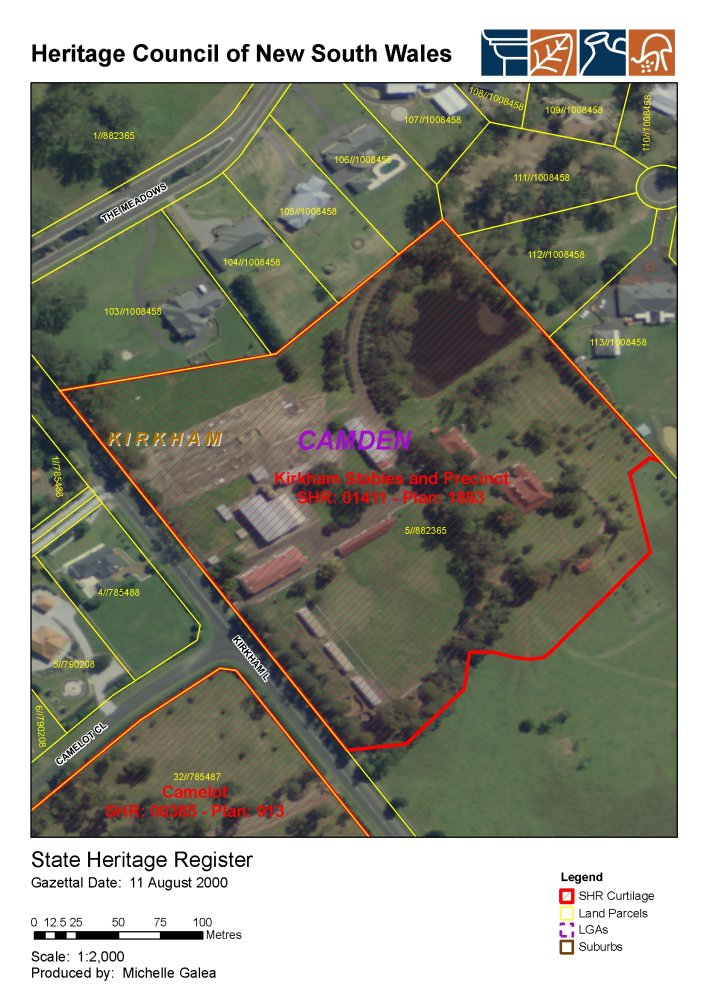
- Heritage boundaries

- Location within Sydney Location within Australia
- 34°02′05″S 150°42′33″E
- Location: Kirkham Lane, Narellan, Camden Council, New South Wales, Australia

History
- Built: 1816–

New South Wales Heritage Register
- Official name: Kirkham Stables and Precinct
- Type: State heritage (complex / group)
- Designated: 11 August 2000
- Reference no.: 1411
- Type: Stables
- Category: Farming and Grazing
- Builders: John Oxley

Kirkham Stables is a heritage-listed former horse stud and dairy and now vacant building and beef cattle farm at Kirkham Lane in the south-western Sydney suburb of Narellan in the Camden Council local government area of New South Wales, Australia. It was built from 1816 by John Oxley. It is also known as Kirkham Stables and Precinct. The property is privately owned. It was added to the New South Wales State Heritage Register on 11 August 2000.

== History ==
The Camden region was originally occupied by the Gundungurra people.

Soon after settling Sydney Cove, colonists set out to explore the Sydney region. When soils around Sydney Cove proved unsuitable for cultivation, a second settlement was established at Rose Hill (later Parramatta) in late 1788. The first Europeans known to have explored the Camden area were Captain Watkin Tench, Lieut. William Dawes and surgeon George Worgan in 1790. Tench noted the country around Camden as a plain with few trees and sandy soil, while the area closer to the Nepean River was thickly wooded. The area was little disturbed until cattle which had escaped soon after the First Fleet's arrival were re-discovered in the Camden area in 1795. The area became known as the "Cow Pastures". Access and settlement was restricted in the area to protect and nurture the cattle. The first grant in the area was 2,023 hectares (5,000 acres) to John Macarthur in 1805. He would eventually amass a vast estate of 9,712 hectares (24,000 acres) here.

A number of grants were made in the area following the overthrow of Governor Bligh in 1809. To counteract the influence of John Macarthur, Governor Macquarie began distributing land on the northern and eastern sides of the Nepean River. One of the largest he made was to Surveyor-General, John Oxley, in 1810.

=== Oxley family ===
One of the first land grants in the area was 243 hectares (600 acres) to John Oxley. Present-day Kirkham Lane defines the eastern boundary of his original grant. In 1815 his holding expanded to 405 hectares (1,000 acres) with purchase of adjacent land. Oxley named his grant Kirkham, after the Abbey in Yorkshire, where he was born. In 1816 he erected a large house and other farm buildings which included the stables building.

The stable Oxley built included horse boxes, storage areas to the rear, a loft and some rooms that were used for accommodation. Farm workers and convicts are rumoured to have stayed in the building when the farm population was at its highest. By late 1825, the first school in the Camden area run by Charles Gordon was operating from Kirkham, and through February 1826 the first regular Protestant church services were also being held there.

During the Oxley family's ownership, Kirkham was a well-regarded horse stud. The English stallion "Bachelor" stood at the stud in 1830. In 1827, the Reverend Thomas Hassell held a Christmas service in the stable loft attended by the family and up to fifty convicts. Oxley cultivated wheat and sheep on Kirkham. By 1824 he had 4000 sheep and was winning awards for his merinos. Kirkham was one of five large estates in the area employing convict labour. Oxley had married Emma Norton in 1821.

Oxley died in 1828 and the property was passed on to his eldest son, John Norton Oxley. During John Norton's minority, Kirkham was managed by Captain Coghill, who had previously worked part of the farm. Coghill grew wheat and maize, which was processed on site in a mill erected in 1828. Farmers from the surrounding area, including the Macarthurs of Camden Park, used this mill. It was used until the 1860s, after which time wheat rust (a fungus) destroyed the wheat crops and production ceased. The mill was demolished in the 1880s.

The farm stayed with the Oxley family and operated as a farm and horse stud farm.

When he reached his superiority, John Norton Oxley returned to run Kirkham. He married Harriet, daughter of the Reverend James Hassell and had seven children. The Oxleys prospered until the 1870s, when they were involved in a failed cattle raising enterprise in Queensland. The ensuing financial disaster led to the sale of Kirkham. Despite his many business interests, Oxley was "much embarrassed in his pecuniary circumstances" at the time of his death, so much so that the Executive Council felt compelled to come to the assistance of his widow and two sons. While refusing to grant a pension, the British Government gave his sons a 2,023-hectare (5,000-acre) grant in recognition of their father's services.

An advertisement in The Sydney Morning Herald edition of 6 December 1870 noted its improvements (all 'first class and in good repair') included about 429 hectares (1,060 acres) of fine rich arable land, spacious brick-built family residence (with ten apartments, kitchen, servants' rooms, dairy, wine house and numerous outbuildings), several well-arranged dwelling houses ('labourers' dwellings'), a superior steam flour mill (with horizontal 10-horse power engine, boiler, French stones, machinery and gear in perfect working order), spacious granary, a superior cottage (of 7 rooms with outbuildings, garden etc.), a large brick building used as a stables (12 stalls), and nearly the whole estate is cleared, stumped and ready for the plough... a "choice vineyard - 5 acres of fine old vines, from which 800-1000 gallons of wine are usually made", together with farm houses, etc., about 80 acres of timber reserved for shelter.

=== White family ===
The estate was sold to James White in the mid-1870s. White (1828–90), born in Stroud, son of a former overseer for the Australian Agricultural Company. During his 20s he became a land owner in the Hunter Valley, and later elected to the NSW Legislative Council as a member for the Upper Hunter Valley (1864-8; 1874) in the 1870s. White was an important figure in the horse racing industry: a long term committee member of the Australian Jockey Club and its chairman in 1880 and from 1883-90. Although he had racing horses on his Hunter Valley properties, Kirkham enjoyed better access to the Sydney race tracks. Late nineteenth century newspapers regularly reported the results of the Kirkham Stud. White also bred horses at his Segenhoe property and built the lavish heritage-listed Big Stable Newmarket in Randwick. The most famous Kirkham horse was stallion "Chester", who won 19 out of 29 starts, including the Melbourne Cup. White won five AJC Derbys (1884–89) and six VRC Derbys (1877–90). He is reputed to have collected over A£121,000 in stakes from 66 horses winning 252 races. "Chester" died in 1891 and is said to be buried close to the Kirkham Stables. White also raced horses, unsuccessfully, in England.

White carried out improvements to Kirkham estate. The original Oxley homestead was demolished in c.1882, possibly after damage by fire. White commissioned John Horbury Hunt to design a new mansion in the French Gothic style. Hunt had earlier carried out substantial extensions to White's Sydney villa, Cranbrook, at Rose Bay (Bellevue Hill). The mansion he built at Kirkham, now known as Camelot, is separately listed on the State Heritage Register and located on an adjoining property (south of Kirkham Lane). The Camden-Campbelltown Railway line was constructed during White's period of ownership, in 1882. Kirkham Railway Station was the second of nine stations on this line, which operated until the 1960s.

No construction date has been identified for the existing dwelling on the site. The Godden Mackay 1998 conservation management plan suggests a likely date of mid-late 19th century, based on physical evidence. It is thus likely to have been built during the White family ownership. It has been suggested that the dwelling was moved to its existing location at an unknown time.

White died in 1890, but the place still operated as a horse stud. Stock was once again sold off on Emily Scott's death in 1897. The property appears to have been broken up at this time and the horses and Jersey dairy herd sold off.

=== Subsequent ownership ===
By 1902 a section of land comprising 193 hectares (478 acres) of Oxley's grant and 9 hectares (23 acres) of Lord's adjoining grant had been subdivided from the original Oxley land of 405 hectares (1,000 acres) and sold. During most of the 20th century the property has been used for grazing dairy cattle. The current dairy on the site was built in c. 1966 and represents the modernization of dairy facilities on the farm.

The property has had a number of different owners over the ensuing years, with boundary adjustments, identified by Godden Mackay (1998) as follows:

- 1902 – H. L. MacKellar to Isabella Lewis. MacKellar had formerly managed the Kirkham Stud for Mrs. Scott and in 1898 purchased the pick of the Jersey dairy herd. He later became the official starter for the AJC;
- 1920 – Edward Lewis and Walter W. Robins to James Doyle;
- 1926 – Doyle to Thomas Glugston of Narellan, 'farmer';
- 1928 – Glugston to Arthur Wm. Coleman of Darlinghurst, 'builder';
- 1930 – Coleman to Thomas Clugston, of the residence;
- 1936 – George Reading (current mortgagee) to Wm. Joseph Hammond of Sydney, 'merchant';
- 1941 – Hammond to Frank and Ruby Viola Beazley, 'graziers';
- 1945 – Ruby Beazley to Archibald Joseph Chapman of Narellan, 'farmer';
- 1951 – Chapman to Sir Frederick Walter Sutton, Chairman of the Sutton Group of Companies. Sutton resided at Kirkham regularly with his wife. Improvements undertaken under their ownership included construction of at least five buildings associated with horse stud operations, a new dairy and other farm machine buildings. Landscape works were also carried out, including plantings on Kirkham Lane, around the dam and on the loop entry road. A new set of entry gates, believed to have come originally from Scotland, were installed, replacing gates in the same location.
- From 1951 – The Sutton Group of Companies began upgrading and improvement works to again establish a racehorse stud at Kirkham. The farm's dairy ceased operation in 1990. Although the property is still stocked with beef cattle, the horse stud operation has now also finished.

The boundaries of the current farm site are markedly reduced from the second Oxley grant in 1815. It now consists of part of the 1902 subdivision of Oxley's original 1810 grant (land east of Kirkham Lane) which was further reduced at the end of the 20th century for a residential subdivision on the northern part of the property. Within the stables precinct itself a mixed degree of integrity is evident with the introduction of a number of mid-late 20th century stabling and milking yards, machinery sheds, stable buildings and garages now encroaching on the curtilage of the Kirkham Stable building.

== Description ==
=== The Kirkham Stables precinct ===
The precinct contains many buildings including a homestead, workers cottage, managers cottage, stud breeding building, small stables building, horse stables, garages/office, milking sheds, machinery shed, a toilet block, shelter structures, and several built elements including a memorial to Chester ( a racehorse), a memorial to Oxley and monumental entrance gates. However, only the original stable is described in detail below. Other notes follow.

=== Kirkham Stables (1816) ===
This building is in Colonial Georgian style, the design being essentially functionalist, with little of no ornament, and composed in an ordered manner. It is rectangular in its form, with largely symmetrical elevations and well-proportioned openings. The Stables block is the only building that survives of Oxley's 1816 buildings (a large homestead once stood on the south-western side of Kirkham Lane. The Stables are constructed of between 350 and 450 thick masonry walls, now with a rough cast cement render on stone foundations. A brickwork plinth, approximately 1m in height. is used on the front of Kirkham Lane elevations. The building is buttressed along the rear elevation, at each end and at third points. The Stables have a hipped roof, pitched at approximately 33.5 degrees. It is currently clad in painted corrugated iron sheeting. Original shingles appear to remain intact underneath both layers of corrugated-iron. An avenue of English oaks (Quercus robur) marked the entrance to the property. These led to the original 1812 Oxley homestead, which burnt down and was demolished in 1882.

=== Setting ===
Following the property's 1951 acquisition by the Sutton Group of Companies, Sir Frederick Sutton and wife resided here regularly and built at least 5 buildings (horse stud operations), a new dairy and other farm machine buildings. Landscape works were undertaken including plantings on Kirkham Lane around the dam and on the loop entry road. A new set of entry gates, believed to have come originally from Scotland, were installed, replacing an earlier set of gates in the same location. The Kirkham Lane boundary has two mature lines of trees which appear to be silky oaks (Grevillea robusta) and sweet gums (Liquidambar styraciflua).

=== Garden around homestead ===
The homestead garden has a range of mature trees, one of which that is prominent is a Himalayan cedar (Cedrus deodara) near the rear service courtyard. A couple of other large deciduous trees are also in the vicinity and may be sweet gums or perhaps pin oaks (Quercus palustris) by branch pattern. Southwest of the house elevation is a large pin oak (Q.palustris). In front of the house's front verandah has colour which appears to be an Asian pear (P.calleryana/ussuriensis). The view from the house's front rose garden east over paddocks is framed by mature trees on Northern and Southern sides. Between the Stables and Manager's house is a large deciduous tree, either a sweet gum or an Asian pear, among other trees. Near a modern toilet block north-west of the Stables is a large hybrid plane tree (Platanus x acerifolia).

=== Condition ===
As at 20 October 1999, the physical condition is fair.

== Heritage listing ==
As at 20 October 1999, Kirkham Stables constructed in 1816, is probably the oldest large stable/farm buildings in Australia. It is a fine Colonial building of a simple and strong symmetrical design. It is a landmark building whose setting is a relatively intact pastoral landscape, with its historic boundaries still comprehensible. It remains within a farm setting that retains views to and from other contemporary historic places.

The Kirkham Stables precinct provides evidence of a continuity of farming operations dating from the earliest period of settlement to the present. The Kirkham Precinct is significant as evidence of changing agricultural and pastoral practices during that period, and for its association with the development of specialist pastoral bloodstock breeding operations.

Kirkham Stables precinct is associated with important figures in colonial and mid nineteenth-century history. Surveyor Lieutenant John Oxley, an engineer and important figure in the early development of Australia, established Kirkham. A later owner, James White, was an important figure in the pastoral history of NSW, a member of the NSW Parliament and a successful owner and breeder of racehorses.

The Kirkham Precinct was the focus of considerable community social activity during early days of settlement and was a focus for work for people living both inside and outside the property.

Kirkham Stables was listed on the New South Wales State Heritage Register on 11 August 2000 having satisfied the following criteria.

The place is important in demonstrating the course, or pattern, of cultural or natural history in New South Wales.

Kirkham Stables and its broader setting provide evidence of an early Australian land grant and the earliest period rural activity outside central Sydney and Parramatta. It provides evidence of the nature of early farming operations in Australia. It is evidence of the pattern of land alienation, settlement and use in the Camden area. It is associated with Surveyor-General Lieut. John Oxley, and explorer and important figure in the early development of Australia. The historic setting of Kirkham Stables, being Oxley's land holding from 1815, is significant and can still be understood within a largely open landscape defined on three sides by strong geographic and historic boundaries; Camden Valley Way, Macquarie Grove Road and the Nepean River. Kirkham Stables is associated with James White, an important figure in the pastoral history of NSW, a member of the NSW Parliament and a successful owner and breeder of racehorse. The Kirkham Stables was the focus for early and religious activities in the local area and is associated with important early local persons, including Rev. Thomas Hassell.

The place is important in demonstrating aesthetic characteristics and/or a high degree of creative or technical achievement in New South Wales.

The Kirkham Stables is a large and impressive Colonial Georgian style building which provides evidence of a formal understanding of design and taste in that period. The symmetrical design and layout of the Stables, and its close relationship with the formal approach of Kirkham Lane, are features of the early nineteenth-century approach to design and setting. The Kirkham Stables precinct, including the late Victorian period homestead and timber store, retains a pleasant farm character and a visual relationship to and from adjoining historic properties and key approaches.

The place has a strong or special association with a particular community or cultural group in New South Wales for social, cultural or spiritual reasons.

Although no particular research has been undertaken in relation to social value or significance, it is likely that the contemporary local community identifies strongly with the sense of place that remains around Camden, associated with this early history and the role of early properties in the establishment of pastoralism in Australia. Kirkham was significant as the focus of considerable community social activity during early days of settlement in this area, and it is likely that it was also a focus for work for people living outside the property.

The place has potential to yield information that will contribute to an understanding of the cultural or natural history of New South Wales.

Kirkham Stables has the potential to provide evidence of past farming techniques and practices. Documentary evidence indicates archaeological potential in regard to previous structures and paddocks in areas near Kirkham Stables.

The place possesses uncommon, rare or endangered aspects of the cultural or natural history of New South Wales.

The Kirkham Stables are probably the oldest large stable building surviving in Australia.

The place is important in demonstrating the principal characteristics of a class of cultural or natural places/environments in New South Wales.

Kirkham Stables are a representative example of early barn and stable farm buildings.

== See also ==
- Big Stable Newmarket
