= Big Stable Newmarket =

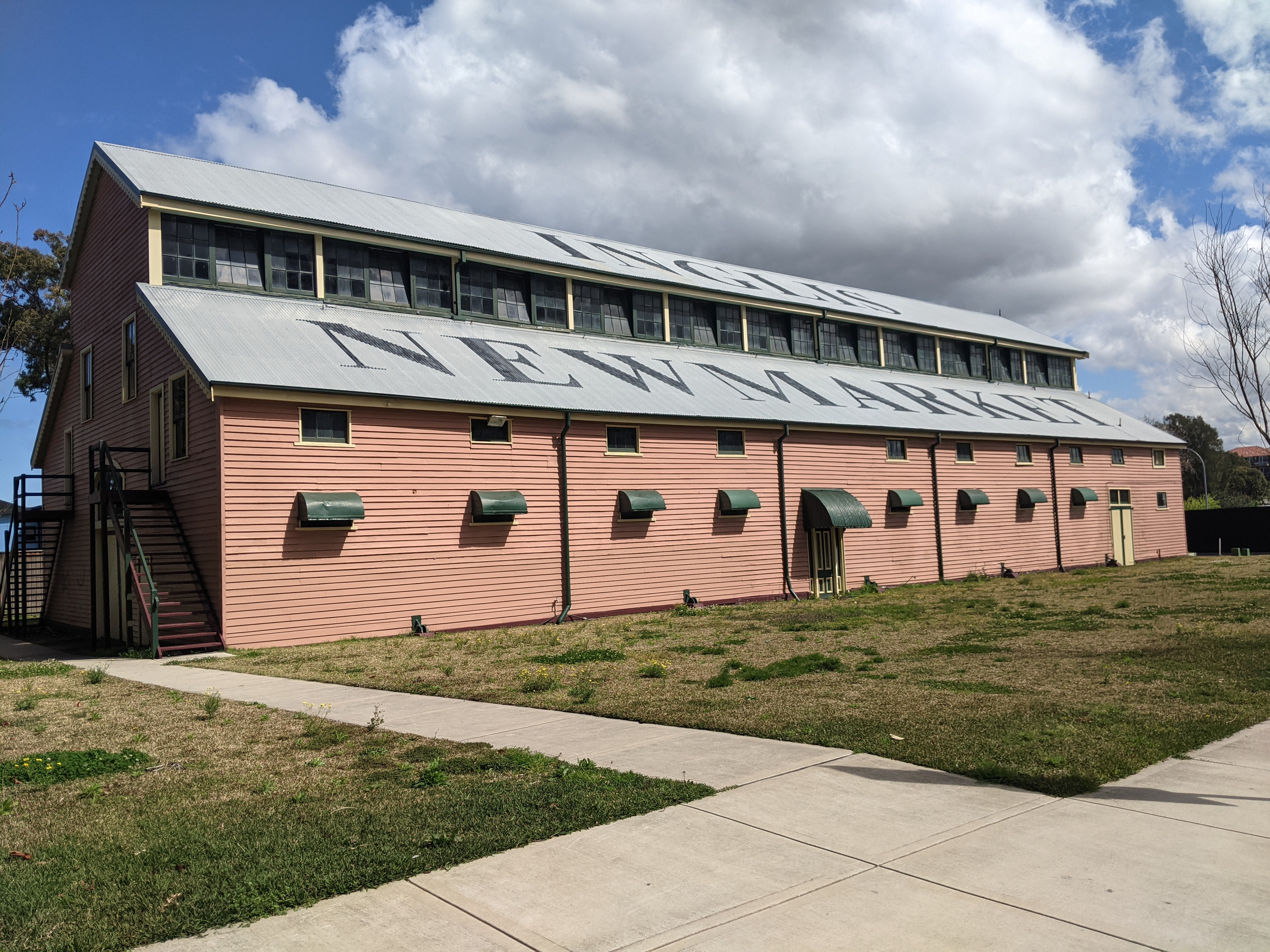
- Big Stable Newmarket, Sydney in 2022

- Location within Sydney Location within Australia
- 33°55′25″S 151°14′15″E
- Location: 29–39 Young Street, Randwick, City of Randwick, New South Wales, Australia

Site notes
- Owner: William Inglis & Son Pty Ltd

New South Wales Heritage Register
- Official name: Big Stable Newmarket; Cranbrook Stables; (adjacent to site of Newmarket House; The Sale Ring; Training Stables/old Tramway & Omnibus Co. Stables)
- Type: State heritage (built)
- Designated: 2 April 1999
- Reference no.: 388
- Type: Stables
- Category: Farming and Grazing

The Big Stable Newmarket is a heritage-listed former Aboriginal land, farm stables, residence, hotel, factory and detention centre and now stables at 29–39 Young Street in the Sydney suburb of Randwick in the City of Randwick local government area of New South Wales, Australia. It is also known as Cranbrook Stables; (adjacent to site of Newmarket House; The Sale Ring; Training Stables/old Tramway & Omnibus Co. Stables). It was added to the New South Wales State Heritage Register on 2 April 1999.

The Big Stable is part of the Newmarket Precinct in Randwick.

== History ==
=== Indigenous history ===
Pre-1780s the local Aboriginal people in the area used the site for fishing and cultural activities; rock engravings, grinding grooves and middens remain in evidence. In 1789 Governor Arthur Phillip referred to "a long bay", which became known as Long Bay. Aboriginal people are believed to have inhabited the Sydney region for at least 20,000 years. The population of Aboriginal people between Palm Beach and Botany Bay in 1788 has been estimated to have been 1500. Those living south of Port Jackson to Botany Bay were the Cadigal people who spoke Dharug, while the local clan name of Maroubra people was "Muru-ora-dial". By the mid nineteenth century the traditional owners of this land had typically either moved inland in search of food and shelter, or had died as the result of European disease or confrontation with British colonisers.

=== Colonial history ===
One of the earliest land grants in this area was made in 1824 to Captain Francis Marsh, who received 4.9 hectares (12 acres) bounded by the present Botany and High Streets, Alison and Belmore Roads. In 1839 William Newcombe acquired the land north-west of the present town hall in Avoca Street.

Randwick takes its name from the town of Randwick, Gloucestershire, England. The name was suggested by Simeon Pearce (1821–86) and his brother James. Simeon was born in the English Randwick and the brothers were responsible for the early development of both Randwick and its neighbour, Coogee. Simeon had come to the colony in 1841 as a 21 year old surveyor. He built his Blenheim House on the 4 acres he bought from Marsh, and called his property "Randwick". The brothers bought and sold land profitably in the area and elsewhere. Simeon campaigned for construction of a road from the city to Coogee (achieved in 1853) and promoted the incorporation of the suburb. Pearce sought construction of a church modelled on the church of St. John in his birthplace. In 1857 the first St Jude's stood on the site of the present post office, at the corner of the present Alison Road and Avoca Street.

Randwick was slow to progress. The village was isolated from Sydney by swamps and sandhills, and although a horse-drawn omnibus was operated by a man named Grice from the late 1850s, the journey was more a test of nerves than a pleasure jaunt. Wind blew sand over the track, and the bus sometimes became bogged, so that passengers had to get out and push it free. From its early days Randwick had a divided society. The wealthy lived elegantly in large houses built when Pearce promoted Randwick and Coogee as a fashionable area. But the market gardens, orchards and piggeries that continued alongside the large estates were the lot of the working class. Even on the later estates that became racing empires, many jockeys and stablehands lived in huts or even under canvas. An even poorer group were the immigrants who existed on the periphery of Randwick in a place called Irishtown, in the area now known as The Spot, around the junction of St.Paul's Street and Perouse Road. Here families lived in makeshift houses, taking on the most menial tasks in their struggle to survive.

In 1858 when the NSW Government passed the Municipalities Act, enabling formation of municipal districts empowered to collect rates and borrow money to improve their suburb, Randwick was the first suburb to apply for the status of a municipality. It was approved in February 1859, and its first Council was elected in March 1859.

=== Racing in Randwick ===
The presence of Randwick racecourse, where racing was first held in 1833, brought to the suburb trainers, jockeys and stablehands, and from them developed a local racing industry which continues to this day. In 1833 horse racing moved from Hyde Park in the city to a Randwick track known as Sandy Course, because of its sandy soil.

Randwick had been the venue for sporting events, as well as duels and illegal sports, from the early days in the colony's history. Its first racecourse, the Sandy Racecourse or Old Sand Track, had been a hazardous track over hills and gullies since 1860. When a move was made in 1863 by John Tait, to establish the Randwick Racecourse, Simeon Pearce was furious, especially when he heard that Tait also intended to move into Byron Lodge. Tait's venture prospered, however and he became the first person in Australia to organise racing as a commercial sport. The racecourse made a big difference to the progress of Randwick. The horse-drawn omnibus gave way to trams that linked the suburb to Sydney and civilisation. Randwick soon became a prosperous and lively place, and it still retains a busy residential, professional and commercial life.

Today, some of the houses have been replaced by home units. Many European migrants have made their homes in the area, along with students and workers at the nearby University of NSW and the Prince of Wales Hospital.

=== Newmarket House, the Big Stables & Show Ring ===
Newmarket House was built on the site of the 1861 Newmarket Hotel. It is expected that the house's eastern section incorporates the remains of the original 1861 hotel structure. To this section it is believed that the southern, single storey wing was added in 1880-83 when the Fennelly /James White interests began in earnest the training of thoroughbred horses for racing. The house forms a 2.3-hectare (5.7-acre) precinct bounded by Barker and Young Streets and the adjoining sites of Randwick High School and Randwick Primary Schools. Newmarket House, along with the "Big Stables", Sale Ring, Training Stables on the site of the old Tramway and Omnibus Company Stables (on Barker Street) demonstrates the evolving importance of this precinct from the "Struggle Town" origins of the 1850s.

Newmarket House has remained a residence and managerial centre since that time. In 1976 it provided the host headquarters for at least four major selling events of Australian blood horse stock each year. Horses offered for sale in January 1976 consisted of 500 yearlings and 800 other types, for April 1976 offers were 800 yearlings, 400 brood mares and 200 other mixed types. The Big Stable was built on land at the rear of the original 1861 Newmarket Hotel. The design of the Stables has been attributed by the official history of Randwick's first 50 years (1859-1909) to "an artist named Fowler" (possibly Fowles) and the actual date of construction is not known precisely, c. 1880. The stables is the most important building in a precinct with four important buildings: Newmarket House, The Big Stables, The Sale Ring and the Training Stables, on the site of the Old Tramway and Omnibus Company Stables (facing Barker Street).

Stabling at the Barker Street (eastern) end of the site has included areas established for the accommodation of Randwick - Sydney coaching horses in 1877-8. This Training Stables is on the site of the Old Tramway and Omnibus Company Stables. The introduction of racehorse training began in 1878 when the noted trainer Michael Fennelly and his patron owner the Hon. James White MLC acquired interests at the site, then named "Cranbrook Stables". Construction of the "Big Stable" appears to have commenced shortly after this date.

William Inglis & Son started selling livestock in 1906 out of rented premises in Randwick. When Arthur Inglis was a boy, trainers would exercise their horses by walking them around the streets near his family's thoroughbred sales complex in Randwick every afternoon. "There were trainers who had stables in the streets between here and Randwick Racecourse", Inglis said. After buying the site in 1917 for £50,000, William Inglis & Son developed the property to include a sales arena and four stables accommodating up to 620 horses. Arthur Inglis is now deputy chairman of the company.

The Sale Ring enclosure is the hub of historic racehorse sales which have been continued without interruption of their direction by the family firm of Inglis & Sons since 1906. The racehorse "Phar Lap" won the AJC Derby at Randwick in 1929. This champion racehorse won 37 of 51 races he ran. A number of prominent racing men including Thomas Payten, Jim Pike, William Inglis and Son and W.J. Smith owned and leased The Stable. During World War II it was used as a Detention Barracks and after the war as a laminex factory.

In 1954 Queen Elizabeth attended the races at Randwick, returning in 1992, when she put the "Royal" into the racecourse's name.

The "Big Stable" was used as a set in some scenes in the box office hit-film, Phar Lap. The Stables were restored in the mid 1980s and received a Royal Australian Institute of Architecture Award, the Greenway Award, for conservation. They have been returned to their original use. Some of Australia's top race horses were trained from this stable. A plaque has been erected on the site by the Randwick City Council, detailing the history of the site, the horses and trainers.

Racing royalty and quality thoroughbred horses have walked through Inglis Stables for over 100 years but it has also been the venue for fashion, celebrities and red-carpet events. The Newmarket site is home to internationally renowned horse sales attended by leading traniners around the world. With The Championships carnival to continue this Saturday and the Schweppes Stakes, the venue's role continues (sic). The heritage-listed buildings on the 11ha site have been the backdrop for photo shoots, fashion shows, charity dinners and TV show launches. Over the years, guests to the complex have included Gracie Otto, TV chippie Scott Cam, models Rachael Finch and Megan Gale and carcing ambassador Emma Freedman, daughter of five-time Melbourne Cup winning trainer Lee Freedman. Now the renowned auction centre and function venue will be turned into a residential and commercial development with up to 700 dwellings, and buildings up to 25m high. In 2011 William Inglis and Sons announced it would move its operation to Warwick Farm and sought to rezone the land to develop. The rezoning went through Randwick Council on 4 April 2015 with maximum heights down from 29 to 25 metres (95 to 82 ft) and dwellings reduced from 900 to 700. The Big Stable was recently restored and returned to its original use by its present owners William Inglis and Son.

In April 2017 the final sale was held at the Newmarket complex. The Inglis empire is about to shift to new headquarters near Warwick Farm Racecourse in south-west Sydney, where there will be plenty of space, easy access for out-of-towners, a new auditorium and luxury hotel. 'In simple terms, we've grown out of context with our surroundings', says Arthur Inglis. 'In the early days, Randwick was quite a long way from the city centre, but it was a horse centre. The University of New South Wales site used to be a racecourse. Now there isn't a horse between us and Randwick Racecourse'. Developer Cbus property bought the 5-hectare (12-acre) site in 2015 for a reported $250 million. Next month, the first homes at Newmarket Randwick will hit the market. By the time it's finished, the medium density development will include about 650 residences, more than 2,500 square metres (27,000 sq ft) of retail or commercial space and 5,000 square metres (54,000 sq ft) of public open space. Bates Smart, Neeson Murcutt Architects, Smart Design Studio and SJB architects will be responsible for different stages of the development. Grand old fig trees will be retained. The Inglis family has donated items from its thoroughbred business to be incorporated into the public space. Big Stable will be given to Randwick Council, though its future has yet to be confirmed. The auction ring will become a recreation space.

== Description ==
'The Big Stable' was built c. 1880 behind the Newmarket Hotel. Measuring approximately 40 by 17 metres (131 by 56 ft) on plan, it is of timber frame construction with external walls of painted weatherboard and a roof of painted corrugated iron. The core of the design is a large central space roofed at a high level with clerestory glazed sashes on both sides, for the full length of the building. Stabling boxes open from each side of this space. Above each row of stabling extends a wide gallery space with open balustrading between the posts of the main structure. Galleries give access to service compartments for feed, harness and grooms' accommodation. The atmosphere on entering this building, with its only external light from the glazing between 7 and 9 metres (23 and 30 ft) above floor level, with free standing timber posts, is very impressive. An American influence in the design has been suggested and could derive from familiarity with buildings of similar function in the blood stock states of the Southern Mississippi.

=== Modifications and dates ===
- 1939–45: World War II it was used as a detention barracks
- After the war as a laminex factory
- Mid 1980s: The Stables were restored and returned to their original use.

== Heritage listing ==
The "Big Stable' is significant on the grounds of architectural quality, unusual function and building type of historic importance. The Newmarket Precinct (Big Stable, Newmarket House, Sale Ring and Training Stables) will assist in the preservation of an historic asset of unusual value to the national heritage and to the municipality of Randwick. The graceful, homely and unpretentious structure of this site survive almost intact from the 19th century amid well kept trees, lawns and pavements. The occupants of the site continue today the horse breeding and training activities traditionally associated with Randwick and give support to complementary activities in the neighbourhood, in complete harmony with the residential character of the area once known as "Struggle Town". Respect for Newmarket's prestige in its associations with Australia's thoroughbred horse breeding industry also extends beyond national borders.

Big Stable Newmarket was listed on the New South Wales State Heritage Register on 2 April 1999.

== See also ==
- Randwick Racecourse
