= William Inglis & Son =

Australian horse auction house

William Inglis and Son Pty Ltd is Australia's largest and oldest bloodstock auctioneer. The business was founded by William Inglis in 1867, and is still owned by the Inglis family, with family members actively engaged in the running of the business. By the 1940s, William Inglis and Son was acknowledged as a prominent auction firm, not just in bloodstock, but in general livestock auctions at the then Sydney saleyards in the suburb of Homebush However, as this article claims, by this stage William Inglis and Son Pty Ltd was most notable for its "world famous Sydney Yearling Sales", held at its Newmarket facility at Randwick Racecourse. In 2015 William Inglis and Son Pty Ltd sold its main premises at Randwick for development. Inglis have stated that they intend to move their operations to a larger site at Warwick Farm Racecourse in 2018.

In 2016, Olivia Inglis, the 17-year-old daughter of the firm's Deputy Chairman and executive, Arthur Inglis, was killed in an equestrian accident. Many significant figures in the equine industry offered their condolences.

== History ==
=== 1867–1900 ===
Inglis' future base 'Newmarket' at Young Street in Randwick, first hosted a yearling sale on May 1, 1867. William Inglis, a son of Scottish migrant Thomas Inglis, acquired the family's original property in Pitt Street, Sydney in 1880 to sell work horses under William Inglis & Son, before moving into Thoroughbreds.

In 1883, Newmarket was acquired by trainer Michael Fennelly who continued to train for Newmarket's previous owner James White. One of the horses trained there was 1883 Melbourne Cup winner Martini-Henry.

More than 100 lots were part of William Inglis & Son's first yearling catalogue in 1905. The auction house moved to Newmarket in 1918 and remained there until 2017 before moving to its new base 'Riverside Stables' at the newly-constructed five star hotel - The William Inglis Hotel - next to Warwick Farm Racecourse.

=== 1900–1990 ===
Inglis In 1945, Bernborough was sold to A.O. Romano for 2,600 guineas, having been barred from racing at metropolitan tracks due to ownership issues. The 'Toowoomba tornado' went on to 15 consecutive races including the Newmarket Handicap and Doomben Cup. Hall of Fame galloper Shannon, set an Australian record in 1947 of 26,000 guineas when bought by W.J. Smith - chairman of Australian Consolidated Industries. He had been offered for sale following the death of his owner and trainer Peter Riddle. Shannon eventually stood at stud in America.

Champion racehorse Tulloch was sold at auction at Newmarket, as a stallion in 1957.

The first $100,000 yearling in Australia was sold in 1978 at Inglis' Newmarket complex.

The first million dollar yearling in Australia, went under the hammer at the 1988 Inglis Australian Easter Yearling Sale. A colt by Bletchingly from Verdi was purchased by champion trainer Bart Cummings for $1.1 million. The colt had been bred by Sir Tristan Antico. Cummings spent a whopping $13.6 million on 43 yearlings at the 1989 Inglis Easter Sale on behalf of two accounting firms, as part of a horse syndication scheme. The global stock market crash in 1987 saw Cummings' backers abandon the deal post-auction, leaving him to face possible bankruptcy. A subsequent auction of Cummings-purchased yearlings - by then aged two - was held at Newmarket in 1989. Called The Night of the Stars, the auction was designed to recoup money paid for 67 yearlings across multiple Thoroughbred sales.

=== 1990–2022 ===
Famed auctioneer John Inglis, the third generation of the Inglis family to sell at Newmarket, retired from the rostrum in 1998 and died in 2006, aged 88. Broodmare Milanova - in foal to Encosta de Lago - set a new Southern Hemisphere record for a thoroughbred sold at auction in 2008, with $5 million paid for the daughter of Danehill by Coolmore Stud. The final Inglis Easter Yearling Sale to be held at the historic Newmarket premises was April 12, 2017.

In 2020, Inglis became the first Thoroughbred auction house to host a major yearling sale in a virtual format, with its two-day Inglis Australian Easter Yearling relying entirely on online and phone bidding due to the COVID-19 pandemic. The sale was successfully conducted without horses, vendors or buyers at the Inglis Riverside complex, eliciting praise from industry participants worldwide. The live stream coverage included video footage of each yearling and two auctioneers in an empty sale auditorium. According to the company, its website saw almost 300,000 engagements during the two-day sale from more than 100 countries. Prior to the virtual auction, more than 150 yearlings were withdrawn from the catalogue including the 60-strong draft from Arrowfield Stud.

== Notable graduates ==
- Home Affairs
- Nature Strip
- Black Caviar
- Chautauqua
- Classique Legend
- Redzel
- Extreme Choice
- I Am Invincible
- She Will Reign
- Starspangledbanner
- Miss Finland
- Fastnet Rock
- Takeover Target
- Silent Witness
- Scared Kingdom
- Exceed and Excel
- Fairy King Prawn
- Choisir
- Encosta de Lago
- Might And Power
- Schillaci
- Naturalism
- Flying Spur
- Rory's Jester
- Luskin Star
- Wenona Girl
- Evening Peal
- Delta
- Shannon
- Hallmark
- Bernborough
- Flight
- Amounis
- Heroic

== See also ==
- Big Stable Newmarket
