= William Inglis Hotel =

Luxury hotel in Sydney, Australia

The William Inglis Hotel
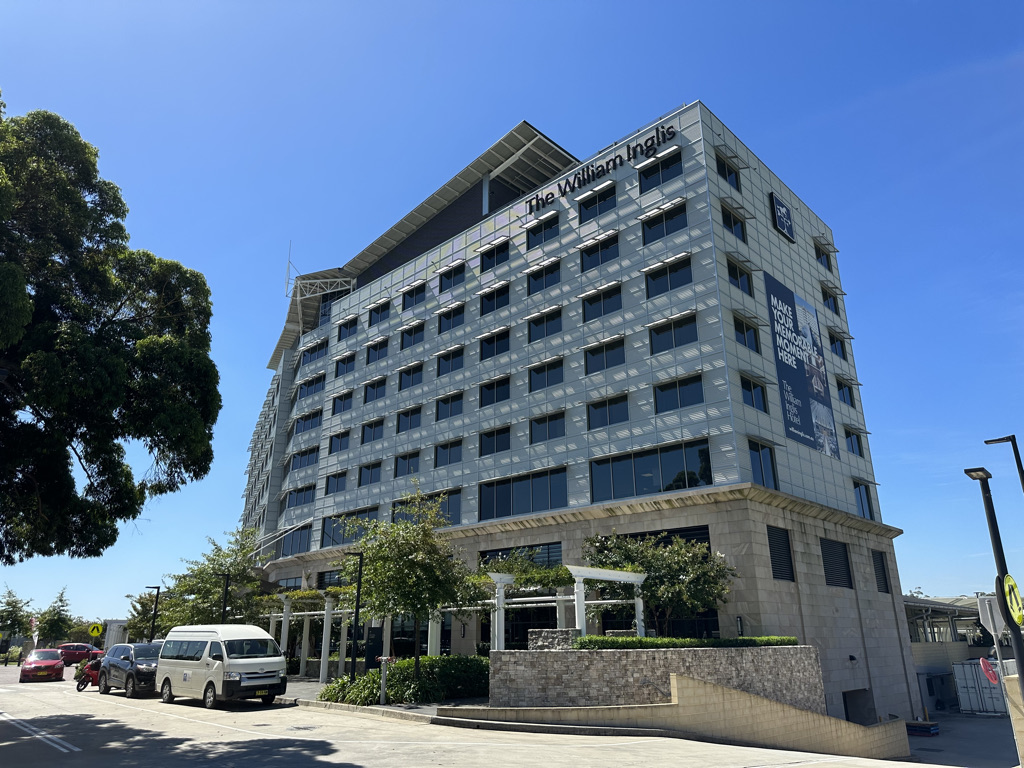
- Interactive map of the The William Inglis Hotel area

General information
- Status: Completed
- Type: Hotel
- Architectural style: Contemporary
- Location: 155 Governor Macquarie Drive, Warwick Farm, New South Wales, Australia
- Coordinates: 33.914692°S 150.945554°E
- Construction started: October 2016; 9 years ago
- Opened: 22 January 2018
- Owner: William Inglis & Son
- Operator: MGallery (Accor)

Height
- Roof: 36 m (118 ft)
- Top floor: 27 m (89 ft)

Technical details
- Floor count: 9

Design and construction
- Architects: Timothy Court & Co.

Website
- https://www.williaminglis.com.au/

The William Inglis Hotel is a luxury hotel in the Sydney suburb of Warwick Farm, New South Wales, Australia. Located at the Riverside Stables thoroughbred sales complex beside Warwick Farm Racecourse, the hotel is operated under the MGallery brand of Accor and is owned by William Inglis & Son. Opened in 2018, it forms part of the company's headquarters following the relocation of its historic Newmarket sales complex from Randwick to Warwick Farm.

The hotel is designed around an equine theme that reflects the history of William Inglis & Son in the Australian thoroughbred industry. It has accommodation, event facilities, restaurants and bars, and direct access to the adjoining Riverside Stables sales and events precinct. The hotel is Australia's first equine-themed hotel and the country's first hotel located on an Australian racecourse. The opening of the hotel was expected to support business and leisure tourism in south-western Sydney.

== History ==
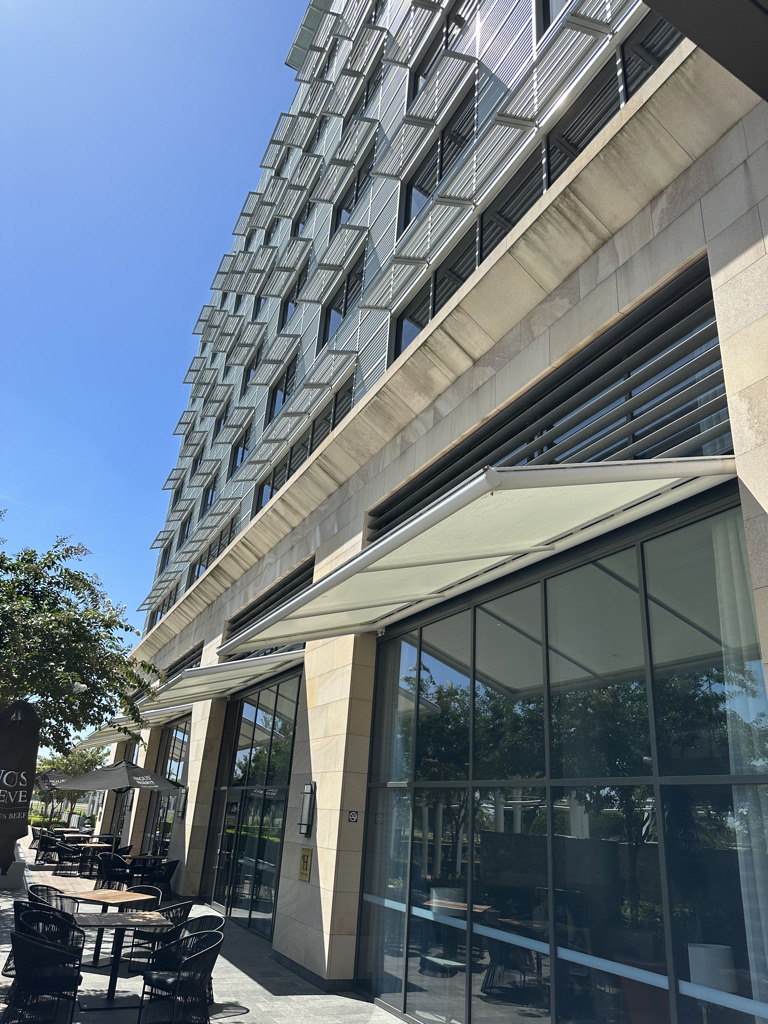
The hotel's glazed façade and outdoor terrace

After conducting thoroughbred sales for more than a century at the company's historic Newmarket complex in Randwick, plans were announced in the late 2000s to relocate operations to a purpose-built site adjoining Warwick Farm Racecourse, on land acquired in 2009. During construction, Arthur Inglis and his family experienced the death of their daughter, Olivia Inglis, in an equestrian accident in 2016.

Despite this, development continued, and the approximately A$140 million precinct was completed in 2018. In addition to the hotel, the redevelopment includes large horse stables, landscaped gardens, covered walkways, event spaces and a purpose-built thoroughbred sales complex to create a new headquarters for the company after more than a century at Randwick. Its opening coincided with the transfer of Inglis' major thoroughbred auctions to Warwick Farm.

== Geography ==
The William Inglis Hotel is located on Governor Macquarie Drive in Warwick Farm, near the border with Chipping Norton, approximately 25 minutes from Sydney Airport and about 30 kilometres (19 mi) south-west of the Sydney central business district. The hotel overlooks Warwick Farm Racecourse, allowing guests to observe trackwork from several areas of the hotel.

Located on the outskirts of Sydney, the hotel is situated near areas of bushland, including the river-flat eucalypt forests along the Georges River. It also overlooks the Georges River to the east, Chipping Norton Lake to the north-west and Cabramatta Creek to the north, with walking tracks and other recreational opportunities in the surrounding area. Many rooms and the rooftop pool overlook Warwick Farm Racecourse, while the hotel is within walking distance of Warwick Farm railway station. It is accessible via the Hume Highway and, further west, the Cumberland Highway, and is situated on the north-western fringe of Liverpool.

== Architecture and design ==
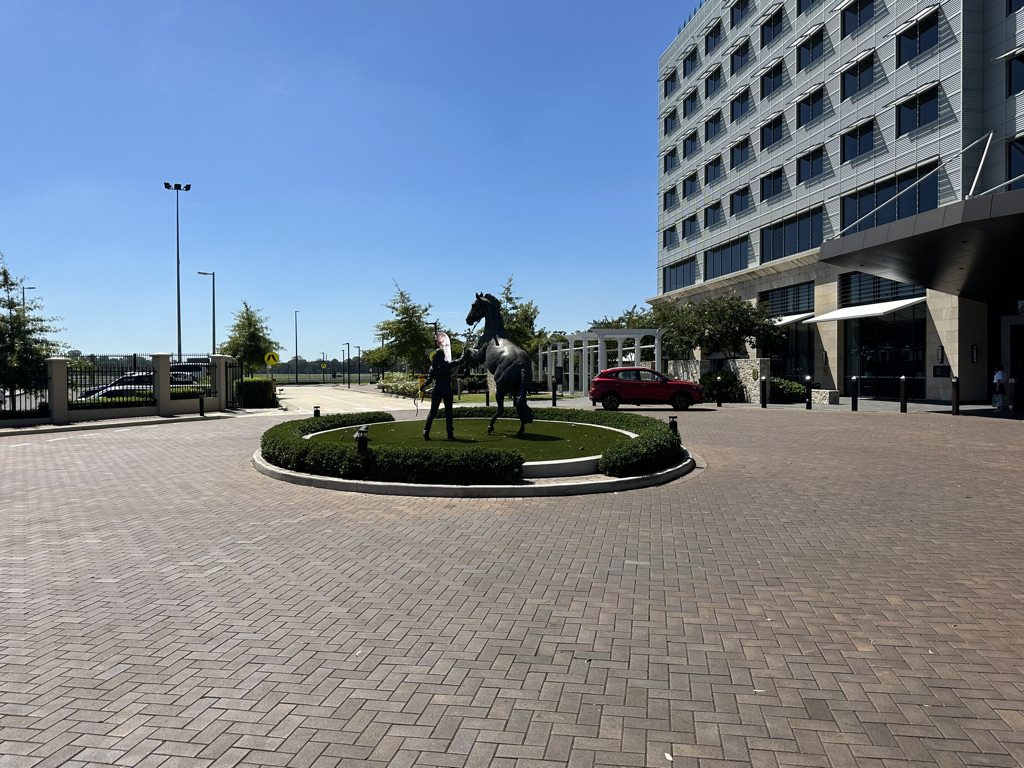
Main entrance and porte-cochère of the hotel

Its design incorporates an equine theme, including a bronze sculpture of a galloping horse, unveiled by John Tapp, that serves as the hotel's emblem and appears on exterior and interior architectural features. The hotel's architecture and interior design incorporate references to Australian horse racing and thoroughbred breeding. Guest rooms feature racing-inspired artwork and décor, while public spaces display historic photographs, trophies and memorabilia associated with William Inglis & Son. The Newmarket Room restaurant is themed in tribute to William Inglis & Son's former Newmarket sales complex in Randwick and adjoins the outdoor Newmarket Gardens dining area. At the time of opening, the hotel comprised 122 Superior Rooms, 13 Superior King Suites, eight Executive King Suites and a presidential suite, the latter named after the champion Australian racehorse Black Caviar.

The hotel's interior incorporates portraits of the Inglis family, paintings of notable thoroughbred horses, and historic photographs of the company's history. Reclaimed timber from the family's former Randwick stables has been used in railings, doors, tables and benches. Outside, landscaped gardens include an antique horse drinking fountain.

Additional equine-themed design elements include historic black-and-white photographs, horse motifs incorporated into carpets, horseshoe-inspired decorative features, and other racing-related details throughout the hotel. The lobby café features a large tiled artwork depicting the champion racehorse and influential sire Heroic.

=== Facilities ===
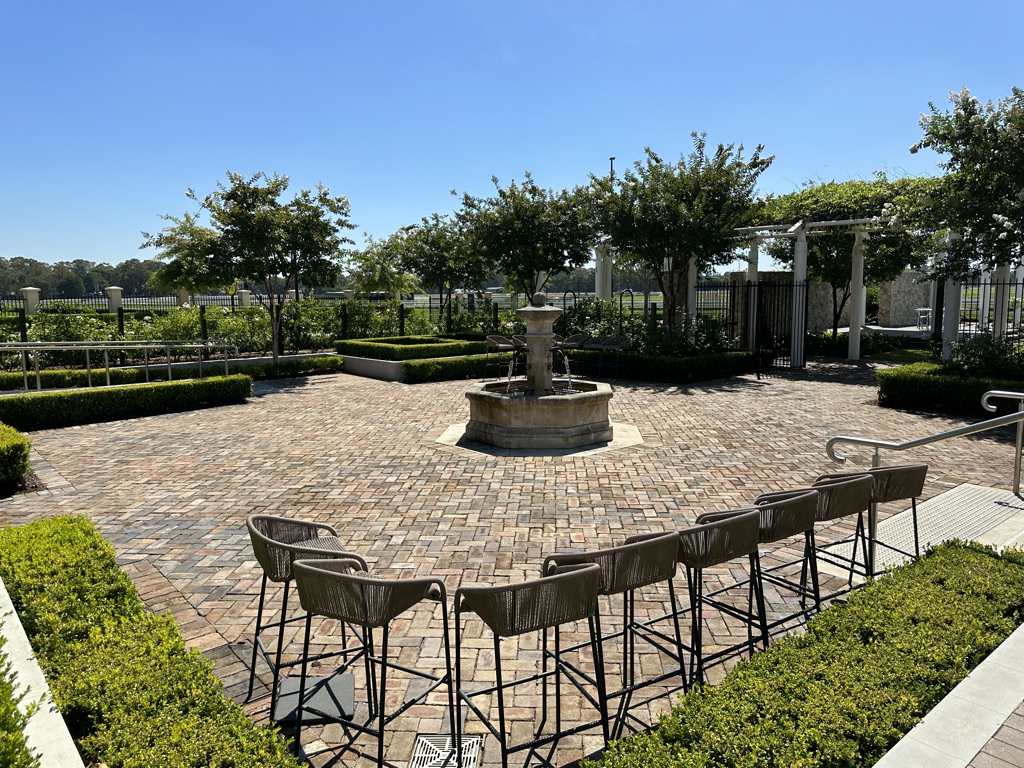
Newmarket Gardens with racecourse in background

The hotel contains 144 guest rooms and suites, conference facilities, a day spa, fitness centre, outdoor rooftop swimming pool, a terrace, and several dining venues, including the Newmarket Room restaurant, Heroic Café and the 1867 Lounge Bar.

Each guest room is named and themed after a champion racehorse sold through the William Inglis & Son sales ring. The hotel is connected to the adjoining indoor sales arena, which is visible from the 1867 Lounge Bar, named after the year William Inglis & Son began operating as a horse auctioneer in Sydney.

The hotel is integrated with the Riverside Stables precinct, which includes horse stabling, sales arenas and event spaces used for international thoroughbred auctions. It also serves as an event venue and can accommodate up to 1,000 people. Other event spaces include the Garden Pavilion and the Big Barn.

== Awards ==
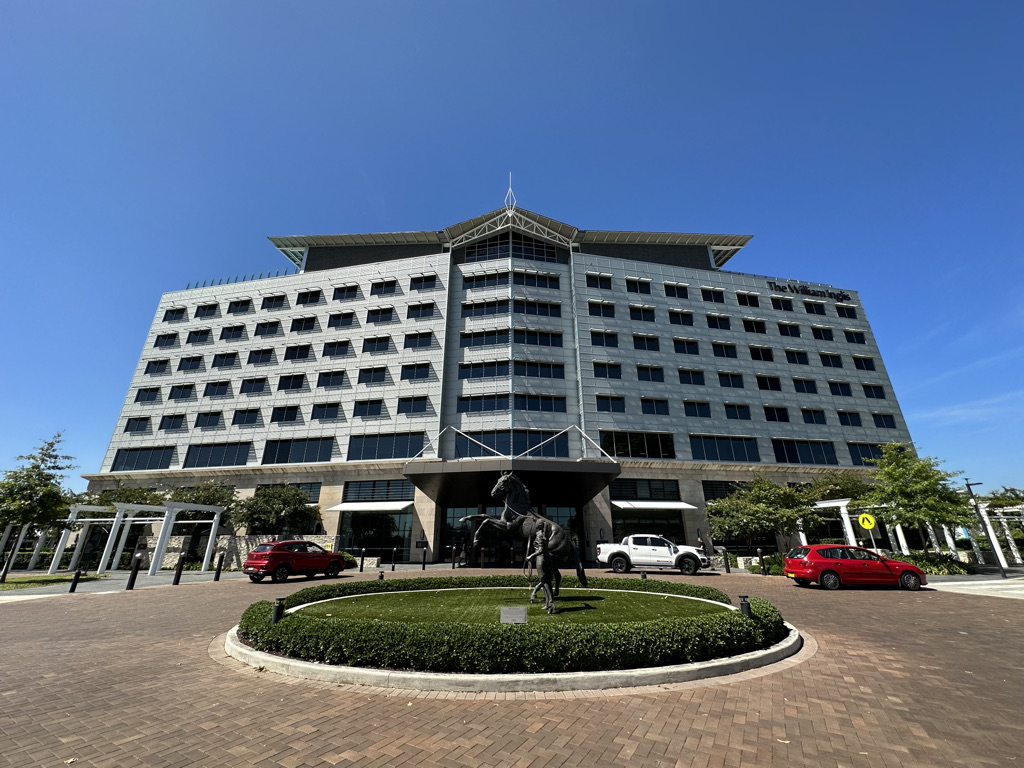
Front view of the hotel

- In 2018, the William Inglis Hotel and Riverside Stables development received two awards at the Excellence in Brick & Block Awards for its brick and block masonry construction.
- In 2026, the Newmarket Room was awarded a Chef Hat in recognition of its culinary standards.

== See also ==
- Warwick Farm Racecourse
- William Inglis & Son
