= Tapp =

Tapp or TAPP may refer to:

- Tapp (card game), a traditional south German card game
- Tapp Tarock, a traditional tarock card game played in Austria
- Tapp (surname)
- TAPP (fare collection system), used on the PATH rapid transit system in New York and New Jersey, United States
- The Alan Parsons Project, abbreviated as TAPP
- TAPP (smart card), an electronic fare collection system used by the Port Authority of New York and New Jersey
