= Henry Gyles Turner =

Australian banker, historian and writer (1831–1920)

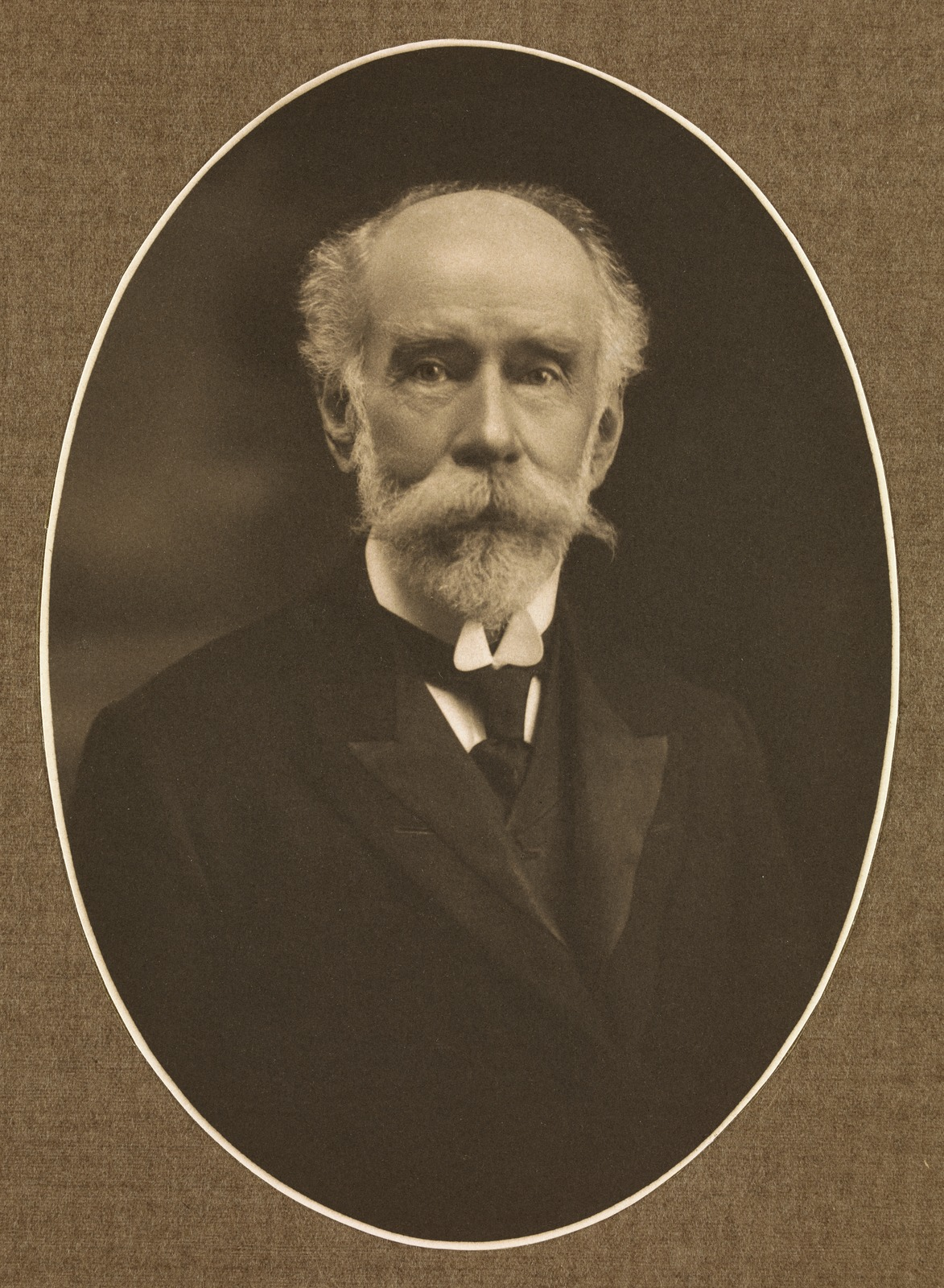
- Henry Gyles Turner (photographed in about 1910).
- Born: Henry Gyles Turner; 12 December 1831; Kensington, London, England
- Died: 30 November 1920 (aged 88); Melbourne, Victoria, Australia
- Occupations: Banker, writer, historian
- Spouse: Helen Ramsay (m. 1855)
- Parents: William Turner; Caroline (née Gyles)

Henry Gyles Turner (12 December 1831 – 30 November 1920) was a notable Australian banker, writer and historian. He entered the banking profession as a clerk in London, and in 1855 emigrated to Melbourne where he advanced his career. In 1870 Turner was appointed general manager of the Commercial Bank of Australia Ltd., a position he held until his retirement in 1901.

Under Turner's management the Commercial Bank expanded its business to become a major Australian bank. During the 1880s the colony of Victoria underwent a rapid and unrestricted period of real estate inflation and land speculation, during which the Commercial Bank extended loans to the land finance companies and speculators. The boom ended by the early 1890s and the subsequent fall in property prices led to bankruptcies, the collapse of building societies and a loss of confidence in the banking sector. By early 1893, with depositors increasingly withdrawing their savings, the Commercial Bank was on the brink of collapse and in early April it suspended deposit withdrawal payments. Under Turner's management the bank, in order to survive, was compelled to undertake a radical reconstruction of its finances, a process that took many years.

Turner had deep interest in the arts and, during his working life and into his retirement, he pursued a wide range of cultural interests, taking leading roles in associated organisations. He had a particular interest in literature, establishing and editing literary magazines and, in 1898, co-writing a volume surveying the development of Australian literature. Turner was a prolific writer on a range of cultural, historical and political subjects, producing articles, publications and delivering lectures. Turner's A History of the Colony of Victoria (in two volumes) was published in 1904.

== Biography ==
=== Early years ===
Henry Gyles Turner was born on 12 December 1831 at Kensington, London, the son of a tailor, William Turner, and his wife Caroline (née Gyles). He was educated for four years at the Poland Street Academy in Westminster. When he was aged about fifteen, Turner was apprenticed to William Pickering, the publisher and bookseller. In 1850 Turner delivered his first lecture before the St. George's Club in London, on the subject of 'American Literature'. In 1851 he edited a short-lived journal published by the St. George's Club called Our Magazine.

In about 1851 Turner began work in a lowly-paid position as a clerk with the London Joint-Stock Bank, with a starting salary of £60 a year. In September 1854 he clashed with his managers "concerning the method of promotion in the office" and was requested to resign. Turner decided to emigrate to Australia and managed to secure an appointment in the Bank of Australasia in Melbourne, through the bank's London headquarters. On 4 October 1854 he departed from Southampton aboard the screw-propelled steamship Argo and arrived at Melbourne in early December.

=== Melbourne ===
Turner joined the staff of the Bank of Australasia in Melbourne, initially undertaking clerical duties. Before leaving England Turner had become engaged to Helen Ramsay, who emigrated to Melbourne on a later voyage to join her fiancé. The couple were married on 28 September 1855 at South Yarra.

After settling in the inner-city suburb of South Yarra, Turner began to pursue a range of cultural and recreational interests. On the voyage to Australia Turner had met and become friends with the actor and theatrical entrepreneur George Coppin.^{[A]} Turner joined a theatrical group called the Histrionic Society, with which he performed in city theatres and country towns. It was while working at the Bank of Australasia that Turner first met Marcus Clarke, a fellow-employee in the bank's stationary department. In 1856 W. Sydney Gibbons, the editor of the monthly magazine The Journal of Australasia, offered Turner an opportunity to write for the journal. During 1856 and 1857 he had two serialised short stories published, 'The Captive of Gippsland' and 'The Confessions of a Loafer'. Turner was involved in the launch of the short-lived Australian Monthly Magazine, first published in September 1865. He also contributed articles to journals such as Melbourne's The Spectator and James Smith's satirical Touchstone, as well as The Colonial Monthly (the renamed Australian Monthly Magazine after it was acquired by Marcus Clarke in 1868).

As a young man Turner engaged in sports and recreational pursuits. On holidays he undertook activities such as climbing the You Yangs, a three-day walk along the Mornington Peninsula and a horseback ride to the Murray River and into New South Wales.

=== Banking and the arts ===
In about 1865 Turner was promoted to chief accountant at the Bank of Australasia. In August 1866 he was involved in the formation of the Banks Rowing Club, a boating club "consisting entirely of gentlemen engaged in the Melbourne banks". In September 1871 Turner was elected president of the club.

Turner was a founder, a leading contributor and first president of the Eclectic Association of Victoria, established in May 1867. The Association's stated object was "the unrestricted temperate investigation and discussion of any subject whatever of general social interest and importance". On 2 September 1869 Turner delivered a paper before the Eclectic Association debunking spiritualism. The paper was later published as a twenty-page booklet.

On two occasions Turner received offers to become manager of branches of the Bank of Australasia in New Zealand, both of which he declined. In June 1870 he was about to take up the position of manager of the Brisbane branch of the Bank of Australasia, when the directors of the Commercial Bank of Australia Ltd. offered him the position of general manager of that Melbourne-based institution, which he accepted. He began working there in July 1870, replacing George Valentine as general manager. The Commercial Bank had recently been the subject of extensive fraud by Thomas Draper, its chief accountant, and its balance sheet was in a "most unsatisfactory" state. Turner was given the immediate task of making "a searching investigation" into the bank's finances and to "eliminate all bad and doubtful assets, in order that the shareholders might feel perfect confidence in the basis on which the future prosperity of the bank must be built". Under Turner's guidance the Commercial Bank began to build up its business and undergo expansion. He was successful in attracting mercantile and farming interests to the bank and distributed shareholders' profits with caution. By the mid-1880s the Commercial Bank held deposits of £2,250,000, a reserve fund of £120,000, paid a ten percent dividend, and had opened branches throughout The Mallee, Goulburn Valley and the Western District of Victoria, as well as in London, Sydney, Adelaide and Brisbane.

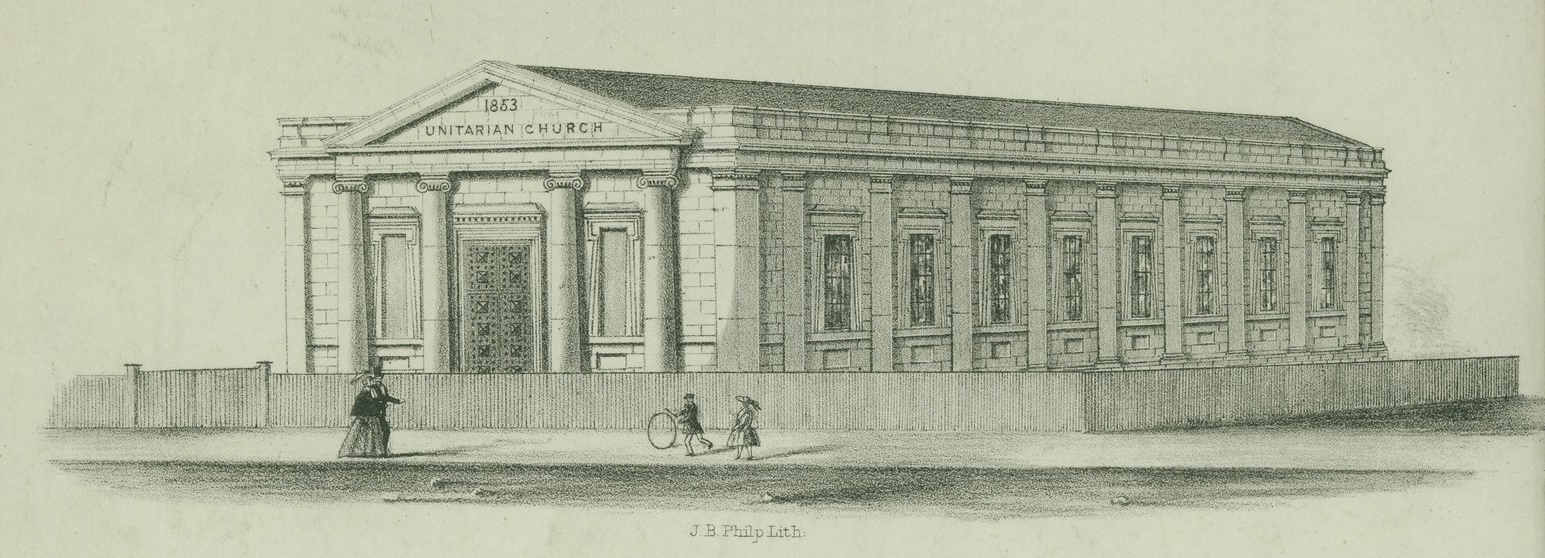
Lithographic print of the Unitarian church in Grey Street (now Cathedral Place), East Melbourne.

Turner was a member of the congregation of the Unitarian church in Melbourne, which was established there in the early 1850s. By 1860 he held the role of secretary in the church organisation and by 1870 he was one of six elected lay preachers. In October 1870 Turner's younger sister Martha arrived from England and also joined the congregation. From about October 1872 Martha Turner also began conducting services in the Unitarian church as a lay preacher. In October 1873 Miss Turner was elected by the congregation as the permanent minister of the church, following the death of Rev. Henry Higginson six months earlier. By her election to the role Martha became the first woman in Australia to be ordained as a pastor of a church.

Turner, together with Alexander Sutherland, Arthur P. Martin and others, established a literary magazine named The Melbourne Review with initial capital of £100. The quarterly magazine, described as being "devoted to social, philosophical, speculative, and general literary subjects", was commenced in January 1876 and edited by Martin for the first six years. The first issue included articles such as Turner's 'An Episode in California Banking', describing the suspension and resumption of business of the Bank of California in 1875, and 'The Story of the Eureka Stockade' by Marcus Clarke. Turner served as editor of The Melbourne Review from 1881 to 1885.

Following the death of his mother in 1876, Turner left Australia in March 1877 for a visit to England and a holiday in Europe.

In September 1881 Turner was elected president of the Victorian Rowing Association.

On 22 February 1882 Turner left on a business trip to England aboard the steamship Liguria. He supervised the establishment of an office of the Commercial Bank in London, which opened its doors in July 1882. Turner was one of three prominent Victorians to represent the colony as commissioners at the Bordeaux Wine Exhibition which opened in June 1882. On 28 September 1882 he attended a banquet in London celebrating the victory of the Australian cricket team against the English side. Turner returned to Australia aboard the R.M.S. Rosetta, which arrived at Melbourne on 29 November 1882.

In April 1884 Turner was one of three new appointments as trustees of the Public Library, Museums, and National Gallery of Victoria.

=== The bank crisis ===
By the 1880s, as the children of the emigrants of the 1850s reached maturity and with pastoral expansion and public investment near their peaks, the colony of Victoria underwent a rapid and unrestricted period of real estate inflation and land speculation, financed by a rapid expansion of bank lending and large capital inflows from Britain. During the height of the speculative boom, from about 1883 to the end of 1888, many building societies and property finance companies (known as 'land banks') emerged, reliant on banks loans but also in competition with the banks. During the boom the commercial banks lent heavily to the land finance companies, mortgage companies, and other entities and individuals who speculated on the property and stock markets. The period of frenzied speculation was marked by a weakening of the prudential standards of the commercial banks.

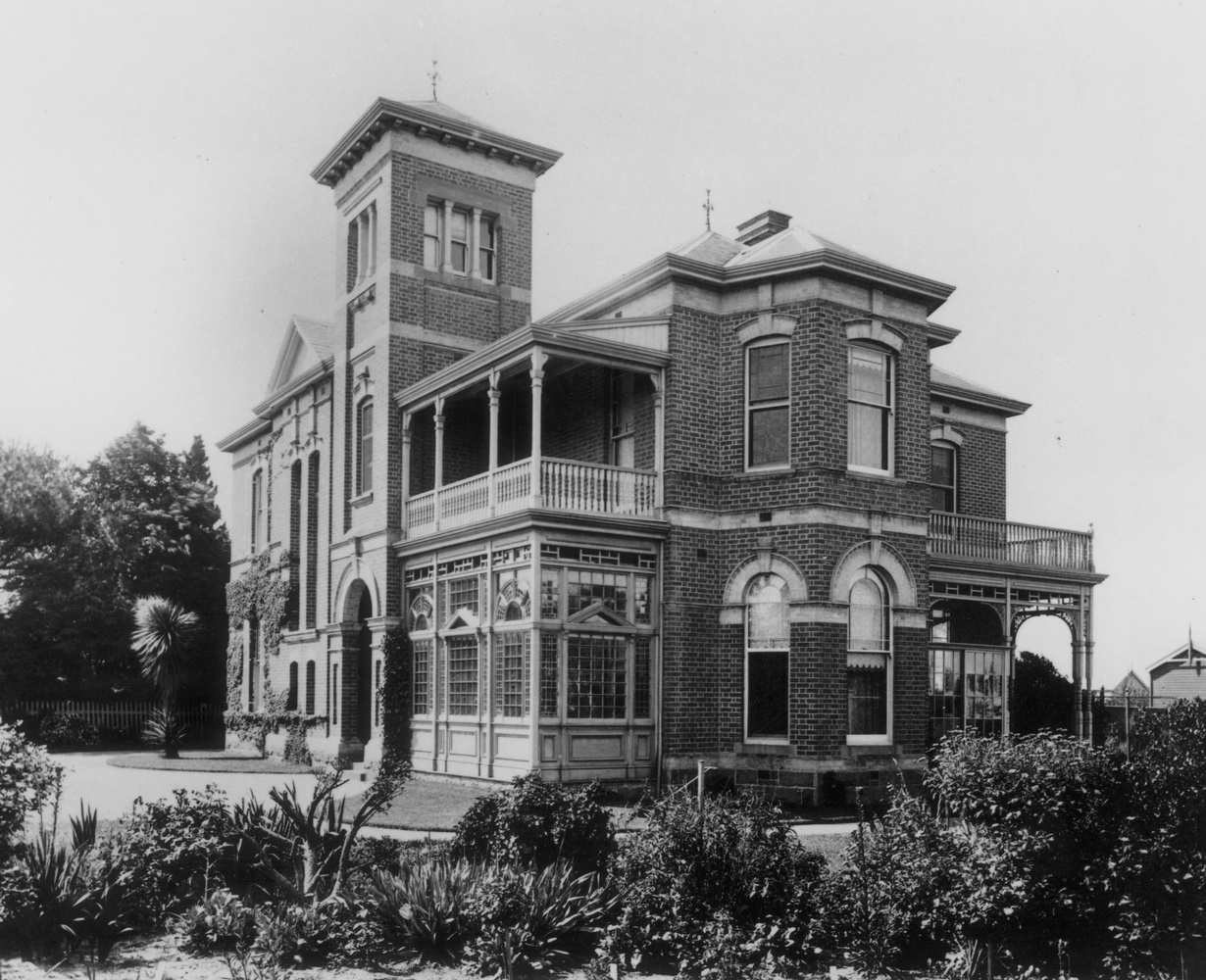
'Bundalohn' in Tennyson Street, St. Kilda, the home of Henry Gyles Turner and his wife.

In 1886 Turner took an active part in founding the Bankers' Institute and was elected its first president. In 1887 Turner purchased land in Tennyson Street, St. Kilda, on which he had constructed 'Bundalohn', a grand double-storey brick house in the Italianate style.

In early March 1888 Turner and his wife left for England, via Hong Kong, aboard the steamer Tsinan. The couple stayed in London for much of the time, though for several months they undertook "a holiday tour on the Continent". Turner and his wife returned to Melbourne in late February 1889 aboard the R.M.S. Iberia.

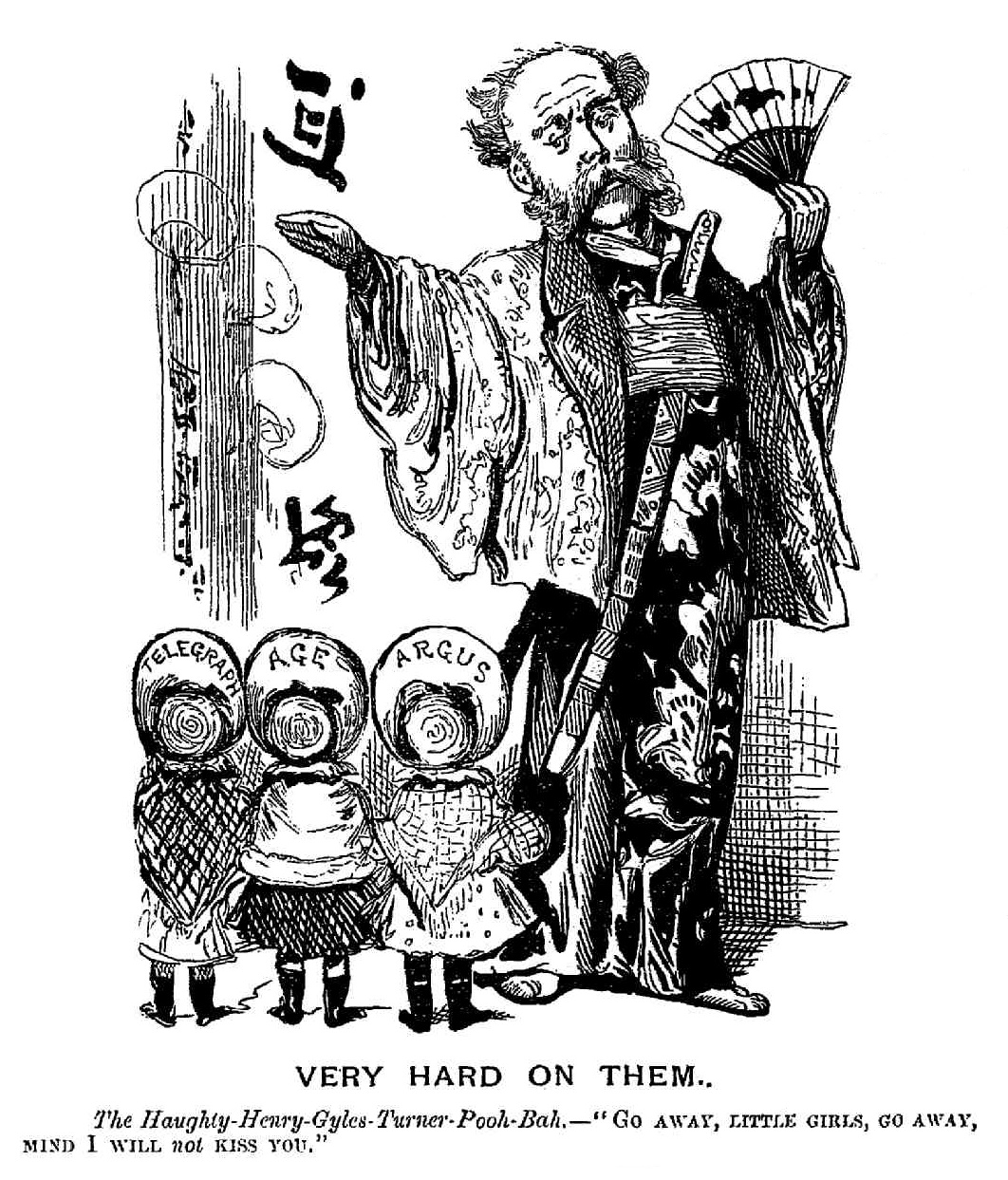
'Very Hard on Them', a cartoon featuring H. Gyles Turner, published in Melbourne Punch, 21 April 1886, in response to critical comments by the banker directed at the Melbourne press.

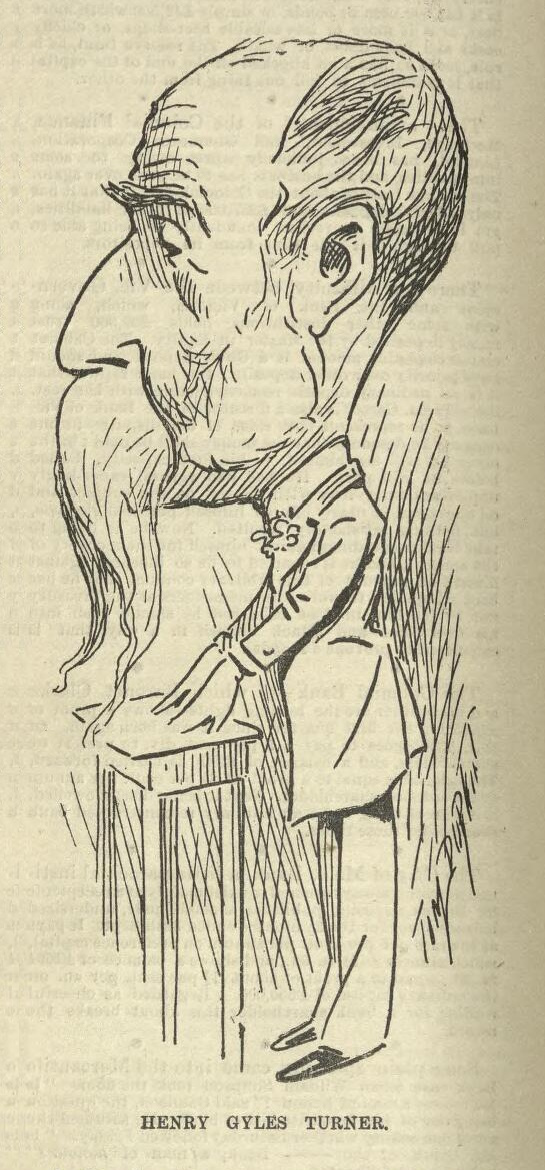
Caricature of Turner by Tom Durkin, published in The Bulletin, 11 November 1893.

In May 1889 Turner, in his role as president of the Melbourne Chamber of Commerce, gave a speech on the subject of the land boom and its unraveling. The bank manager attributed the intensification of "the whole wild reckless business" to the "exceptionally easy condition of the money market, due to the large influx of British capital". When that source of finance began to diminish "the end came with unlooked-for suddenness". Turner added: "Scores of business men, who saw that this result must follow, and loudly predicted it, found themselves entangled in the ramifications that ensued, so widespread had been the operations, so complicated the inter-relation of the numerous companies and their satellites". In his address, Turner gave an optimistic assessment of the colony's future in view of its "natural vigorous growth in numbers and in wealth", concluding that Victoria "has not suffered any depletion of its own resources, while a permanent and substantial advance in values has undoubtedly been established".

Property prices continued to collapse during 1889, but at first most of the property companies survived from British investments and loans from colonial commercial banks. It became evident that the fall in property prices was not a temporary fluctuation. By about 1891 the inflow of British deposits petered out and the colonial banks began to tighten lending due to the increased cost of British loans, leading to a succession of failures of the building societies and land banks. The growing number of failures caused a severe decline in public confidence in financial institutions, broadening the crisis to those institutions at the core of the financial system, the commercial banks.

The Commercial Bank was a member of the Associated Banks of Victoria, an alliance of the colony's largest banks which was formally constituted in 1877 by those institutions that conducted the government's banking business in Victoria. In March 1892 the Associated Banks met to discuss joint action in an attempt to allay the growing panic in the community. Although what was agreed upon fell well short of an open-ended obligation to support each other, their public statement lacked details and had a vague positivity which the colonial press interpreted as a virtual blanket mutual guarantee and consequently the growing panic was alleviated.

In January 1893 the Federal Bank of Australia closed its doors and suspended the payment of deposit withdrawals. It was the smallest member of the Associated Banks and had previous direct ownership links to a building society. Reports of ongoing links between the bank's management and the building society had sullied the bank's reputation and in the ten months before its closure the bank lost a third of its Australian deposits. After examining various options the Associated Banks declined to support the Federal Bank, contrary to the general perception of its public statement of March 1892. Their inaction undermined confidence in the banking system and led to runs on member banks that were suspected of being in a weakened condition, in particular the Commercial Bank of Australia.

The Commercial Bank of Australia under Turner's management had been the fastest-growing bank during the 1880s and by September 1892 it represented 17 percent of total bank assets in Victoria. The bank had aggressively competed for the accounts of the building societies and land development companies during the speculative boom and advanced loans to the land speculators. As the building societies began to fail in the early 1890s, the Commercial Bank hastened the process by withdrawing their overdraft facilities. During 1892 the exposure of the bank to the failed speculators "became a favourite subject of gossip" and its deposits began draining away. In the first three months of 1893 withdrawn deposits totalled one million pounds. The Commercial Bank's share price was an indicator of the declining confidence in the bank. From its peak of £12 in 1890, the shares were priced at £2.8s by late March 1893. On 2 March 1893 the Victorian government proposed a fund to be formed through the Associated Banks for any bank requiring assistance. Under the proposed model the Commercial Bank would receive £1.9 million, but the bank argued that this was insufficient and demanded the Associated Banks undertake to meet all of its deposits (about £11 million) and sought public declarations of support from the Associated Banks and the colonial government. The government and the other banks declined to offer an unqualified guarantee and on Wednesday, 5 April, immediately after the Easter holidays, the Commercial Bank suspended deposit withdrawal payments.

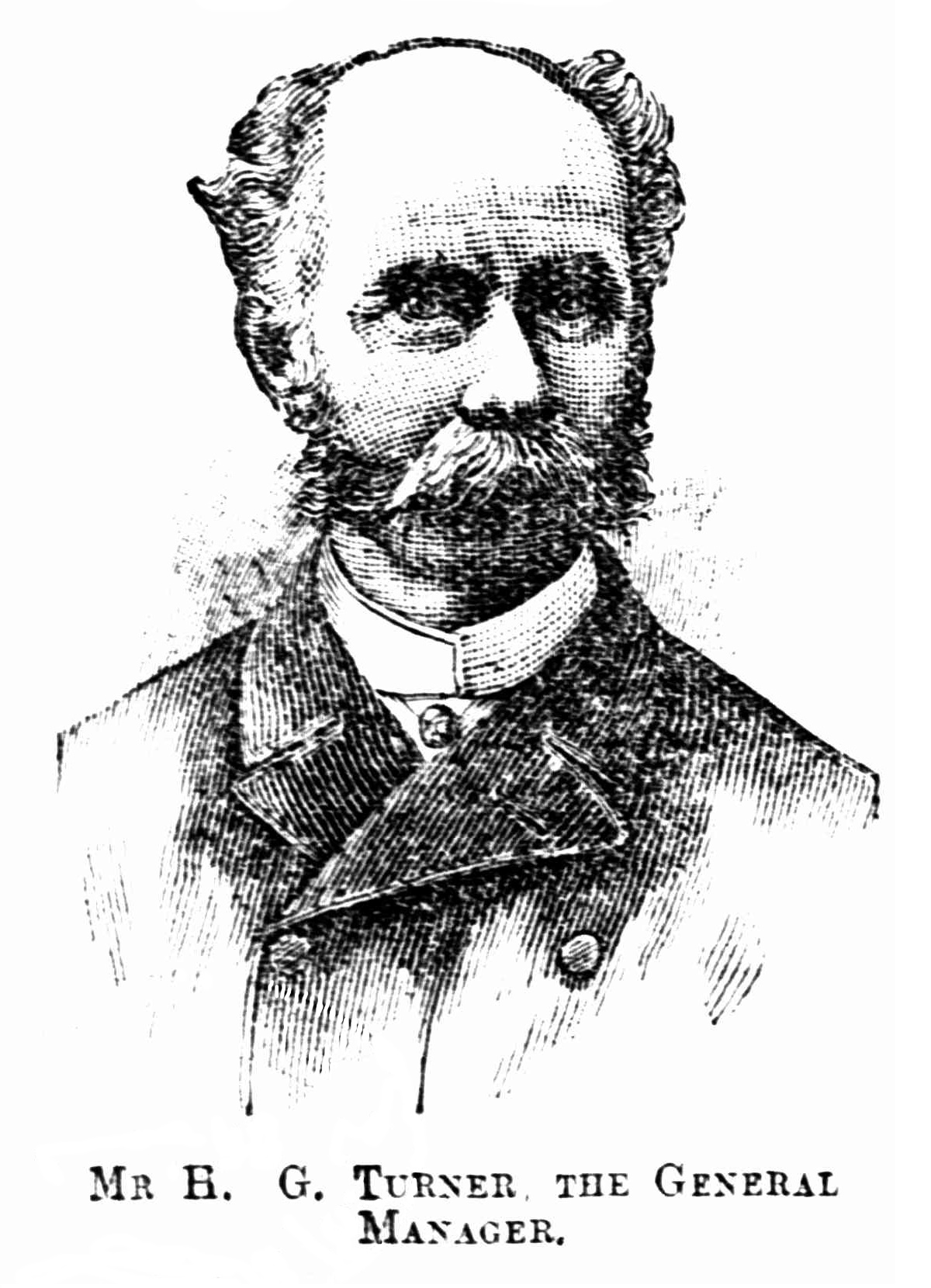
Henry Gyles Turner, general manager of the Commercial Bank of Australia (published in The Weekly Times, 8 April 1893).

As it had done for the Federal Bank, the Associated Banks refused to bail out the Commercial Bank, but on this occasion the likely reason was that the body "simply did not have enough funds to engage in a wholesale bailout". On Thursday, 6 April, Turner and one of the bank's directors, James Service, faced a meeting of shareholders at the Athenaeum Hall to present a plan for the financial reconstruction of the bank.^{[B]} The plan included the calling-up from shareholders of all outstanding capital (which led in many cases to shareholders being forced into bankruptcy) and the compulsory conversion of fixed deposits into preference shares. Deposit accounts under £100 could be operated upon, but larger balances were subjected to a postponed obligation. In presenting the reconstruction plan, Service told the shareholders that there was no alternative course "between rejection and acceptance of these proposals", adding: "Either accept this proposal or go into liquidation". The meeting of shareholders was generally sympathetic to the proposals by the directors and "not a single dissentient voice was raised throughout the whole of the proceedings". When Turner addressed the meeting, he stated: "It has been the wish of my life to see the Commercial Bank restored to its former prosperity", adding: "I can honestly say that we have worked diligently, unremittingly, and with intense singleness of purpose in the interests of the shareholders". Writing a decade later of the Commercial Bank's reconstruction scheme, Turner admitted that it was "an infraction of the unwritten law and honorable traditions of the English banking system" and was "fully open to the charge of being oppressive and inequitable", adding "but the only alternative was not to be contemplated".

The Commercial Bank remained on the brink of collapse for many years. In July 1896 a general meeting of "extended depositors" of the bank was held at the Athenaeum Hall, where those present were asked to approve a "rearrangement scheme". James Service told the meeting of declining earnings and "the unexpectedly slow process of realising old assets"; to avoid the suspension of the bank once again, he claimed that "the making of better terms with creditors was unavoidable". The complex rearrangement scheme involved the freezing of deposits, to be paid back over time. After the scheme was approved the chairman of the meeting delivered the following remarks: "All had been sufferers in the collapse, and must do what they could to put the old bank right again, as well as to put a brave face on matters and bring back prosperity to the dear old colony". In March 1897 the Commercial Bank took advantage of the new Companies Act to write down its capital by 1.2 million pounds, which Turner explained by the depreciation of the bank's securities and the inability of its debtors to pay in full. In 1897 the bank formed the Special Assets Trust Co. Ltd., into which all the unrealised assets of the old bank (mainly land) were placed. These assets were gradually sold and the funds used to eventually liquidate the bank's liabilities amounting to twelve million pounds.

In early March 1898, Turner and his wife were on a holiday tour of New Zealand when they were involved in a coach accident near Little River after the driver lost control of the horses, with the coach plunging twenty-five feet below the road. Turner was "severely hurt, and his wife was greatly shaken and distressed". Turner returned to Melbourne in April 1898, "almost fully recovered" from his injuries.

Turner and Alexander Sutherland collaborated in the writing of The Development of Australian Literature, published in 1898. In a review of the book in Sydney's Sunday Times, the writer described the title as "somewhat pretentious", there being "scarcely an attempt to epitomise the characteristics of our indigenous literature, to gauge its quality or to estimate its future". With more than two-thirds of the volume "devoted to appreciative biographies" of Adam Lindsay Gordon, Henry Kendall and Marcus Clarke, the reviewer was critical of the authors' "notable omissions" and failure to "attach sufficient weight to the ever-increasing number of young authors who... are gradually permeating the country with an original literature... dealing with genuine phases of Australian social conditions and the life and character of the people".

In April 1899 an article written by Turner titled 'The Treatment of Paupers and Criminals' was published in Banker's Magazine. The article attracted press attention for its extreme views, summarised in an editorial in The Age newspaper as: "The banker sternly eliminates the emotions as a factor in his creed, and bases his conclusions on the logic of pagan philosophy – of the survival of the fittest, the fittest being always those who are most capable of suppressing the other". For criminals who had been "three times convicted" Turner advocated permanent banishment to an inescapable island where "no restraint should be put upon their actions" and "no doubt anarchy and violence would be rampant". Although Turner had "some qualms about the killing of paupers and the physically unfit", he nevertheless had a less-immediate solution: "The physically sick and helpless, and afflicted poor, we must continue to bear the burden of while they last, without too assiduously striving – under the impulse of a mistaken sympathy – to prolong their unhappy existence". An editorial in the Bairnsdale Advertiser concluded: "Thus, with the sick and poor succumbing to their ailments and to starvation, and the evil-doer – the poor evil-doer, of course – driven away beyond the seas, the social world would happily consist of only good men with money and social distinction of the Henry Gyles Turner type!". An editorial in the socialist newspaper The Tocsin was particularly scathing, describing the banker's ideas as "characteristic of the crass Conservatism of which Turner is a shining light", representing "Individualism with the mask off, and show in all its nakedness the tyrannical brutality... and the blatant selfish ignorance that Socialism has to fight". The writer took the opportunity to remind readers that Turner was "a prominent and questionable player in one of the most execrable financial crashes of modern times" and "one of the leading first robbers guilty of the criminal incapability which caused the Land Boom, and led to its disastrous results".

=== Later years ===
Turner retired from the Commercial Bank of Australia in June 1901 after thirty-one years as general manager. The reason for his retirement was reported as "continued ill-health consequent on his New Zealand accident".

Turner's two-volume history of Victoria was published in November 1904. Melbourne's Age newspaper gave it a scathing review, describing it as exhibiting "the narrowest spirit of political rancour". The reviewer took particular note of the author's account of the Victorian speculative boom of the 1880s, during which Turner, as manager of the Commercial Bank, was a prominent and active participant in the events. Turner's description of the boom and subsequent bust is described as skating "over very thin ice", in view of "his own part in the bad business". ... The review concluded: "The book is crude in thought, illiberal in feeling, malicious towards individuals, fawning towards personal friends...; coloured in its facts and distorted in its deductions".

In 1905 Turner was elected president of the Melbourne Shakespeare Society.

Turner's The First Decade of the Australian Commonwealth was published in 1911, followed in 1913 by Our Own Little Rebellion: The Story of the Eureka Stockade.

In 1914 a portrait in oils of Turner was completed by E. Phillips Fox and presented to the National Gallery of Victoria for its collection in March of that year.

Turner's wife Helen died in late-May 1914. The couple had no children. Helen Turner was buried in the St. Kilda cemetery.

Over many years, both during his working life and in retirement, Turner was a member of multiple institutions, associations and philanthropic organisations in Melbourne, often taking on office-bearer roles. Such memberships included: life member of the Royal Colonial Institute, trustee of the Public Library and National Gallery of Victoria, trustee of St. Kilda Cemetery, trustee of the Unitarian Church, member of council of the Royal Geographical Society of Australasia, the Melbourne Chamber of Commerce, the Victorian Rowing Association and a member of the Melbourne, Yorick and Bohemian Clubs. In late-May 1917 Turner delivered a public lecture at the National Gallery of Victoria on the topic of 'The War and Literature'. In May 1919, after he was re-elected as chairman of the board of trustees of the Victorian National Gallery, Turner was the subject of criticism in Smith's Weekly newspaper as representing the reactionary views standing in the way of progress at the gallery. Turner and other trustees were described as "harmless old gentlemen with no special knowledge of art, a conservative distaste for new ideas, and quaint, old-fashioned notions of what is respectable".

Henry Gyles Turner died on 20 November 1920, aged 88, at his residence 'Bundalohn', in Tennyson Street, St. Kilda. He was buried at the St. Kilda cemetery.

== Legacy ==
Turner's estate was valued at £29,233 and was the subject of several bequests, including a large collection of his books and manuscripts to the Melbourne Public Library. Direct contributions of £250 each were made to the "sustentation fund" of the Unitarian Christian Church and the Queen's Fund of Melbourne and of £100 each to four other Melbourne charities.

The University of Melbourne was bequeathed a thousand pounds in Turner's will, for the purpose of establishing 'The Henry Gyles Turner Scholarship' to encourage "the scientific study of Agriculture". The perpetual scholarship commenced in 1923.

The remainder of Turner's estate was set apart to create the 'Helen Gyles Turner Samaritan Fund', to pay an annual contribution to a number of Melbourne charities, with a provision to make further donations to "any public relief fund established in connection with any public calamity or distress in Victoria". The fund was still operating as a charitable trust in 2022.

== Publications ==
- Henry Gyles Turner & Alexander Sutherland (1898), The Development of Australian Literature, London: Longmans, Green and Co.

By Henry Gyles Turner:

- Spiritualism: A Paper read Before the Eclectic Association of Melbourne, on September 2nd, 1869 (1869), Melbourne: George Robertson.
- How I Went to Akaroa, and What Befel Me There (1898), Melbourne: Mason, Firth and McCutcheon.
- A History of the Colony of Victoria From its Discovery to its Absorption into the Commonwealth of Australia (in two volumes) (1904), London: Longmans, Green and Co.
- A Plea for Shylock: A Lecture (1907), Fitzroy, Vic.: Wayside Press.
- The First Decade of the Australian Commonwealth: A Chronicle of Contemporary Politics, 1901-1910 (1911), Melbourne: Mason, Firth & McCutcheon.
- Our Own Little Rebellion: The Story of the Eureka Stockade (1913), Melbourne: Whitcombe & Tombs.
- The War, With Some Thoughts on its Aftermath in Australia (a lecture delivered in the Melbourne Public Library on 7 June 1916), Melbourne : George Robertson.
- Dallas Sutherland, Killed in France, Saturday, 19th August, 1916, aged 26 Years: A Brief Memorial (1916), Melbourne: privately printed.
- Memorial of Keith J. Barrett, 4th Royal Fusiliers (City of London Regiment), Who was Mortally Wounded at Guemappe, in France (1917).

== Notes ==
A.George Coppin was a member of the Victorian Legislative Assembly during the periods 1874 to 1877 and 1883 to 1889, after which he served as an elected member of the Legislative Council until August 1895. He was a major shareholder in the Commercial Bank of Australia and was on the board of directors at the time of the 1893 banking crisis.

B.James Service had been a member of the Legislative Assembly. During 1880 he was briefly premier of Victoria, leading a minority government. He was elected to the Legislative Council in 1888. Service had been appointed as a director of the Commercial Bank in June 1870 (at about the time of Turner's appointment as general manager) and became chairman of the board in 1871. In 1892 George Meares replaced Service as chairman of the board of directors.
