= Topp (surname) =

Topp is an English and German surname. Notable people with the surname include:

- Alexander Topp (1814–1879), Scottish minister
- Arthur Topp (1844–1916), English-Australian journalist
- Bob Topp (1932–2017), American football player
- Brian Topp (born 1960), Canadian politician and writer
- Erich Topp (1914–2005), German admiral
- Gerhard Topp Groppler, Danish athlete
- Jools Topp (1958–2026), New Zealand/Aotearoa folk singer & comedian
- Kalman Topp (born 1972), American rabbi and author
- Karl Topp (1895–1981), German naval officer
- Laurie Topp (1923–2017), English footballer
- Lynda Topp (born 1958), New Zealand/Aotearoa folk singer & comedian
- Samuel Topp (1850–1902), English-Australian lawyer
- Shayne Topp (born 1991), American actor and comedian
- Willy Topp (born 1986), Chilean footballer
- Alide Topp (1844–1935), German pianist
