= Arthur Patchett Martin =

Australian writer and literary critic (1851–1902)

Arthur Patchett Martin (18 February 1851 – 15 February 1902), was an Australian writer and literary critic.

Martin was born in Woolwich, Kent, England, the son of George Martin and his wife Eleanor, née Hill. The family migrated to Australia in 1852, arriving in Melbourne that Christmas. Martin was educated at St Mark's School, Fitzroy and later matriculated at the University of Melbourne in February 1868.

Martin worked in the post office from 1865 to 1883; however he was also a casual writer in this period. Having established the Melbourne Review with Henry Gyles Turner in 1876, Martin edited the publication for six years. Martin was a member of the Eclectic Association, fellow members included Theodore Fink, Arthur Topp, Alfred Deakin and David Mickle.

In 1883 Martin moved to London amid controversy over his role as co-respondent in a divorce case; he became a journalist and wrote regularly for the Pall Mall Gazette. Martin was the satirist of the 'Australasian Group' – who regarded themselves as exiles – but retained an interest in Australian literature and other affairs. One of Martin's most solid achievements was the publication of a work entitled "Australia and the Empire", specially dedicated to the First Lord of the Treasury, Mr. Balfour. The opening essay in this work, entitled "Robert Lowe in Sydney," formed the nucleus of the undertaking on which Martin later worked on—the complete political biography of Lord Sherbrooke. Among other literary efforts in London may be mentioned "Oak-bough and Wattle-blossom," the first of those collective stories by "Australians in England" of which there are now quite a series. "Over-the-Sea Stories for the Children of Two Worlds" a profusely illustrated gift-book, is also a collection by Martin. Martin married a widow, Harriette Anne Bullen (daughter of Dr John Moore Cookesley) on 11 January 1886 in London. Together they wrote verse and organised the publications of expatriate Australians in various periodicals.

Martin's health deteriorated and he moved to Tenerife, Canary Islands where he died on 15 February 1902.

Martin was the first of Robert Louis Stevenson's correspondents to write and seek acquaintance with him based on admiration for his work, meaning especially the Cornhill essays.

A sister, Letitia Hill Martin, who was also an accomplished writer, married the theatrical impresario Arthur Garner.

== Bibliography ==
- Sweet Girl Graduate (1876)
- Lays of To-day: Verses in Jest and Earnest (1878)
- Fernshawe: Sketches in Prose and Verse (1882)
- Australia and the Empire (1889)
- True Stories from Australasian History (1893)
- Life and Letters of the Right Honourable Robert Lowe, Viscount Sherbrooke (1893)
- The Withered Jester and Other Verses (1895)
- The Beginnings of an Australian Literature (London, 1898)
