= Warwick Farm =

- Suburb
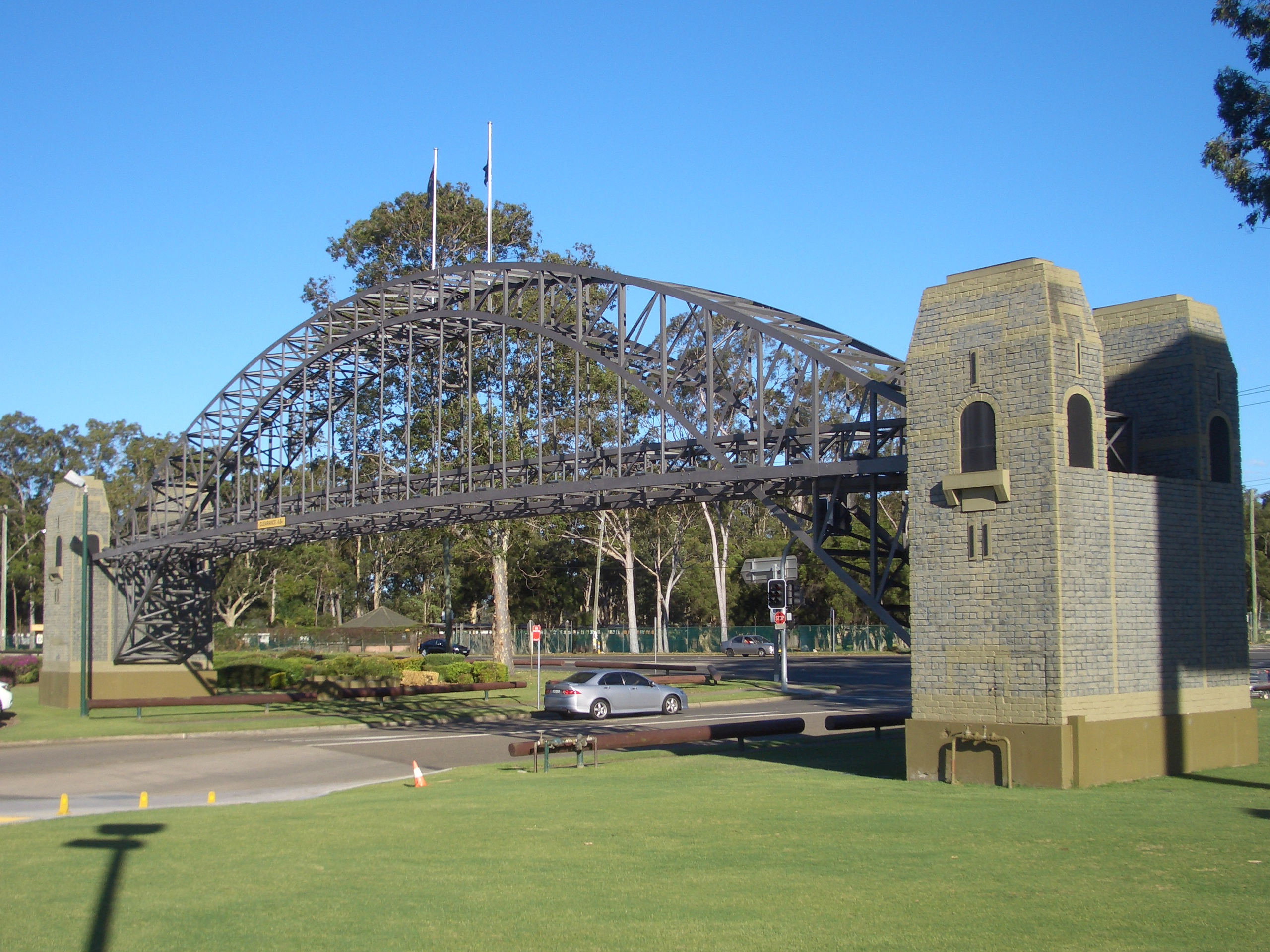
- Replica of Sydney Harbour Bridge

- Interactive map of Warwick Farm
- Country: Australia
- State: New South Wales
- City: Sydney
- LGA: City of Liverpool
- Location: 30 km (19 mi) west of Sydney CBD
- Established: 1804

Government
  - State electorate: Liverpool
  - Federal division: Fowler
- Elevation: 10 m (33 ft)

Population
  - Total: 6,135 (2021 census)
- Postcode: 2170
Suburbs around Warwick Farm
Cabramatta West	Cabramatta	Lansvale
Liverpool	Warwick Farm	Chipping Norton
Liverpool	Moorebank	Chipping Norton

Warwick Farm is a suburb of Sydney, in the state of New South Wales, Australia. Warwick Farm is located 30 kilometres west of the Sydney central business district, in the local government area of the City of Liverpool and is part of the South-western Sydney region.

== History ==
This area was occupied by Irish political prisoners transported after the Irish Rebellion of 1798. Land grants of 40 acres (160,000 m^{2}) were made to transportees in 1809 and for some time it was known as Irish Town. John Hawley Stroud, the superintendent of Liverpool Orphans School, received a grant in 1804 on the present site of Warwick Farm Racecourse and named his property after Warwick in England.

== Landmarks ==
Warwick Farm Racecourse sits on the western shore of the Georges River. A large replica of the Sydney Harbour Bridge sits outside the Peter Warren car dealership, on the Hume Highway. It was built and assembled during half-time at the 1987 Rugby League Grand Final at the Sydney Cricket Ground by Royal Australian Navy apprentices before being purchased by Peter Warren. The suburb also features a luxury hotel called the William Inglis Hotel.

== Motorsport ==
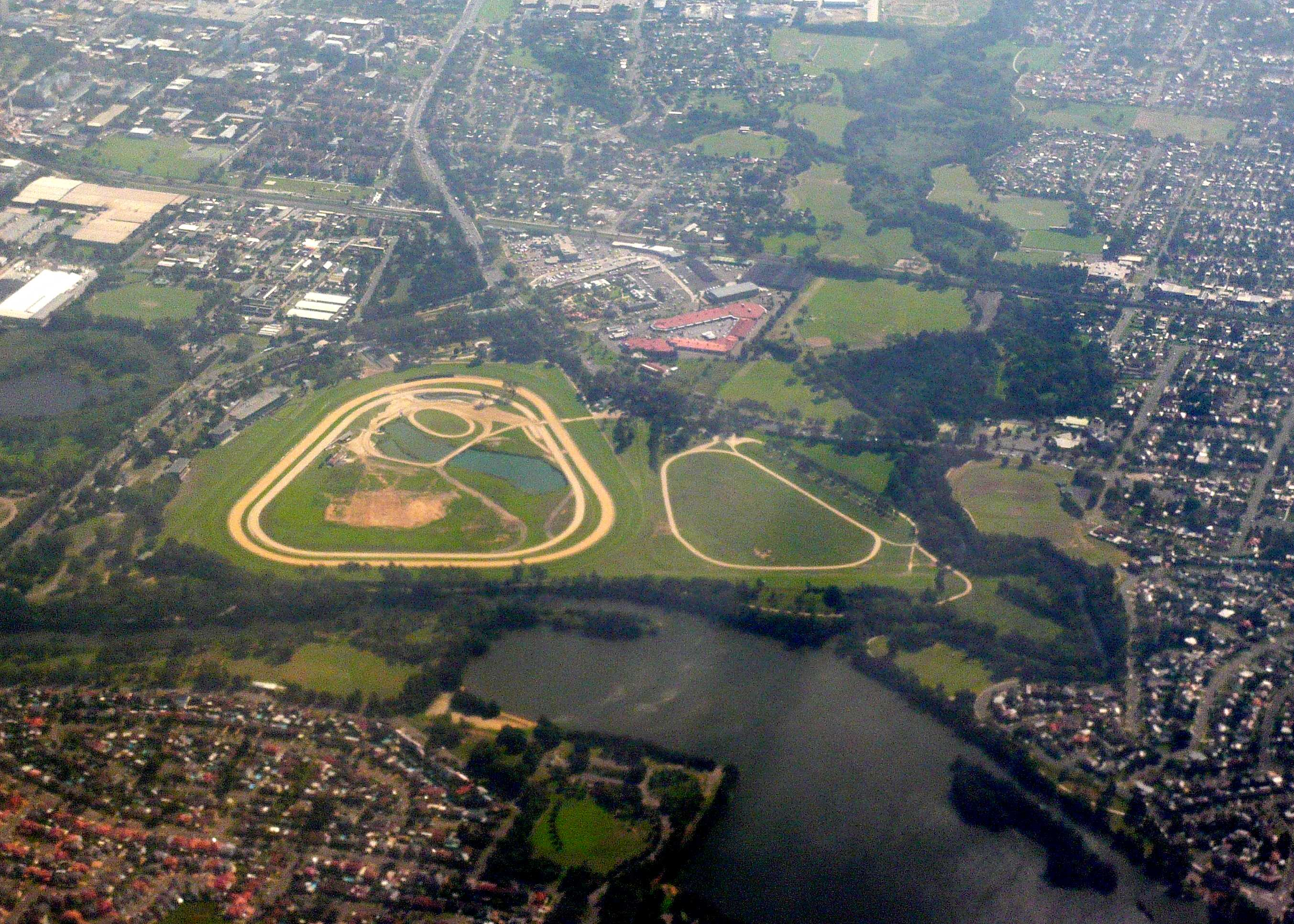
Warwick Farm Racecourse

Warwick Farm Raceway was a motor racing facility which was in operation from 1960 to 1973. Located within the Warwick Farm Racecourse site, it hosted numerous major events including the Australian Grand Prix. The first big meeting at the track, a round of the Tasman Series in January 1961, drew a crowd of 65,000 spectators. However, the circuit was expensive to run, as two "crossings" had to be placed over the horse racing track, and thus large crowds were needed to sustain racing.

By the early 1970s the Australian Jockey Club (AJC) was receiving financial support from the TAB, and thus did not need the relatively low returns from motor racing, and didn't want to improve the circuit. When the Confederation of Australian Motorsport requested to have Armco fencing erected around the circuit, the AJC refused, and the circuit closed.

The last major race was a round of the 1973 Australian Touring Car Championship on 15 July, which was won by Peter Brock.

== Transport ==
Warwick Farm railway station is on the Main Southern railway line. A branch line ran to Warwick Farm Racecourse for race day trains until closed in August 1990. The Hume Highway is the main arterial road through the suburb. The William Long Bridge crosses the Georges River to Chipping Norton.

== Population ==
According to the 2021 census, the suburb of Warwick Farm had a population of 6,135. 34.2% of people were born in Australia. The next most common countries of birth were India 6.6%, Vietnam 5.2%, Iraq 4.6%, China 2.6% and Fiji 2.3%. 28.7% of people spoke only English at home. Other languages spoken at home included Arabic 11.1%, Vietnamese 7.2%, Serbian 4.0%, Hindi 3.0% and Mandarin 2.7%. The most common response for religion was Catholic at 18.3%.
