= The OpenMS Proteomics Pipeline =

The OpenMS Proteomics Pipeline (TOPP) is a set of computational tools that can be chained together to tailor problem-specific analysis pipelines for HPLC-MS data. It transforms most of the OpenMS functionality into small command line tools that are the building blocks for more complex analysis pipelines. The functionality of the tools ranges from data preprocessing (file format conversion, baseline reduction, noise reduction, peak picking, map alignment,...) over quantitation (isotope-labeled and label-free) to identification (wrapper tools for Mascot, Sequest, InsPecT and OMSSA).

TOPP is developed in the groups of Prof. Knut Reinert at the Free University of Berlin and in the group of Prof. Kohlbacher at the University of Tübingen.

For more detailed information about the TOPP tools, see the TOPP documentation of the latest release and the TOPP publication in the references.

The OpenMS Proteomics Pipeline is free software released under the 3-clause BSD license.
