= Arthur Topp =

Anglo-Australian colonial journalist (1844–1916)

Arthur Maning Topp (7 October 1844 – 17 January 1916) was an Australian journalist who helped to establish the Melbourne Review.

Topp was born in Huddersfield, Yorkshire, being the eldest son of the late Samuel Topp, who emigrated to Australia in 1858. His maternal great-grandfather was William Blanchard (1749–1836), for 60 years editor and proprietor of the York Chronicle, and uncle of William Blanchard (1769–1835), the well-known comedian of the Covent Garden Theatre. A. M. Topp was elder brother of Samuel St John Topp.

In 1858 Topp, his parents and a brother, Charles, left England for Melbourne, and Arthur Topp completed his education at the Melbourne Church of England Grammar School, which was just then opened with Dr. John Edward Bromby as Headmaster. Afterwards going into business, he took an active part in establishing the Melbourne Review, of which the first number appeared in January 1876, and for six years was one of the editorial committee. He contributed to this periodical a number of articles, chiefly on political and historical questions. Two of them, "English Institutions and the Irish Race", and "A few more words on the Irish Question", appeared separately in pamphlet form and attracted a good deal of attention. Topp was a member of the Eclectic Association, fellow members Arthur Patchett Martin, Theodore Fink, Alfred Deakin and David Mickle were his close friends.

In 1878, in conjunction with Arthur Patchett Martin, he initiated a movement "for the purpose of expressing public appreciation of the services of the Bar of Beaconsfield in the settlement of the Eastern Question." A public meeting was held in the Melbourne Town Hall on 29 July 1878, at which a resolution to the above effect was carried with enthusiasm, and speeches were delivered by several prominent public men, including James Francis and James Service. An illuminated address also was sent to Lord Beaconsfield (Benjamin Disraeli). In 1880 Topp joined the literary staff of The Age newspaper, and in 1882 that of the Argus, with which he was connected for a number of years. He has contributed extensively to the columns of this paper and to the Australasian.

On 17 January 1916 Topp died at South Yarra, survived by his wife Leila Leonora, née Sanders (they married at South Yarra in 1884) and by his two sons.
