= Tappe =

Tappe is a surname. Notable people with the surname include:

- Horst Tappe (1938–2005), German photographer
- Ruth Tappe Scruggs, nee Ruth Tappe (1893–1980), American clubwoman
- Ted Tappe (1931–2004), American baseball player

== See also ==
- Tappa
