= Samuel Topp =

Australian barrister

Samuel St John Topp (13 June 1850 – 1 August 1902) was an Australian barrister who became a leading member of the Victorian legal profession.

Topp was born in Huddersfield, Yorkshire, the youngest son of Samuel Topp, who emigrated to Australia in 1858. Samuel St. J. Topp was brother of Arthur Topp.

Topp received his education at King Edward VI.'s Grammar School, Birmingham, and at the Church of England Grammar School, Melbourne (where he arrived in 1861). He subsequently matriculated at the University of Melbourne, where he proceeded to the degrees of LL.M. and B.A. In the Law Course he carried off the third year Law Exhibition and the Law Scholarship in his fourth year, taking first-class honours on each occasion. He wound up his university career by carrying off the Shakespeare Scholarship, the great literary prize of the university.

Topp was admitted to the Victorian Bar on 13 September 1877, and acted as law reporter on the Victorian Law Reports for several years. He also contributed some articles on literary subjects to the Melbourne Review in the earlier years of its existence. He has practised his profession ever since his admission to the Bar, and has occupied for some years past a leading position as an advocate in the Equity, Insolvency, and Mining Courts of Victoria. Topp was a member of the Bar Committee of Victoria and also a member of the Board of Examiners for Barristers of the Supreme Court.

In 1876 Topp had married Mary Anne Chesterton (died 18 May 1878) and he married Emma Dunn in 1881. Topp died of an internal haemorrhage at Caulfield, Victoria on 1 August 1902 and he was buried in the Brighton cemetery. Topp was survived by his second wife and a daughter of his first marriage.
