= John Tapp =

British writer on navigation

- Occupation: Writer on navigation

John Tapp (fl. 1596–1615) was a British writer on navigation.

== Biography ==
Tapp combined the editing and writing of books with the selling of them. The earliest work which bears his name is ‘The Arte of Navigation,’ translated from the Spanish by Richard Eden in 1561, and now ‘corrected and augmented with a Regiment or Table of Declination and divers other necessary tables and rules of common navigation … by J. T.,’ 4to, 1596. The preface is signed in full ‘John Tap,’ and the work has the imprint of ‘Edw. Allde,’ ‘to be sold by Hugh Astley, dwelling at Saint Magnus Corner.’ In 1602 he brought out ‘The Seaman's Kalender, or an Ephemerides of the Sun, Moone, and certaine of the most notable fixed Starres. … The Tables being for the most part calculated from the yeere 1601 to the yeare 1624 by I. T.;’ and this, printed also by E. Allde, for John Tapp, ‘was to be sold at his shop on Tower Hill, neere the Bulwark Gate.’ A third book is a ‘Treatise on Arithmatic,’ which was represented in the British Museum by a second and posthumous edition, brought out in 1658 by P. Ray, gent., under the title of ‘Tap's Arithmetick, or the Path-way to the Knowledge of the Ground of Arts,’ and dedicated to Maurice Thomson, governor of the East India Company, as the former edition had been to Sir Thomas Smythe ‘The Arte of Navigation’ went into a third edition in 1615, when the author was still alive and had succeeded Astley in the shop at Saint Magnus Corner.
