= Warwick Farm Racecourse =

Racecourse in Warwick Farm, New South Wales

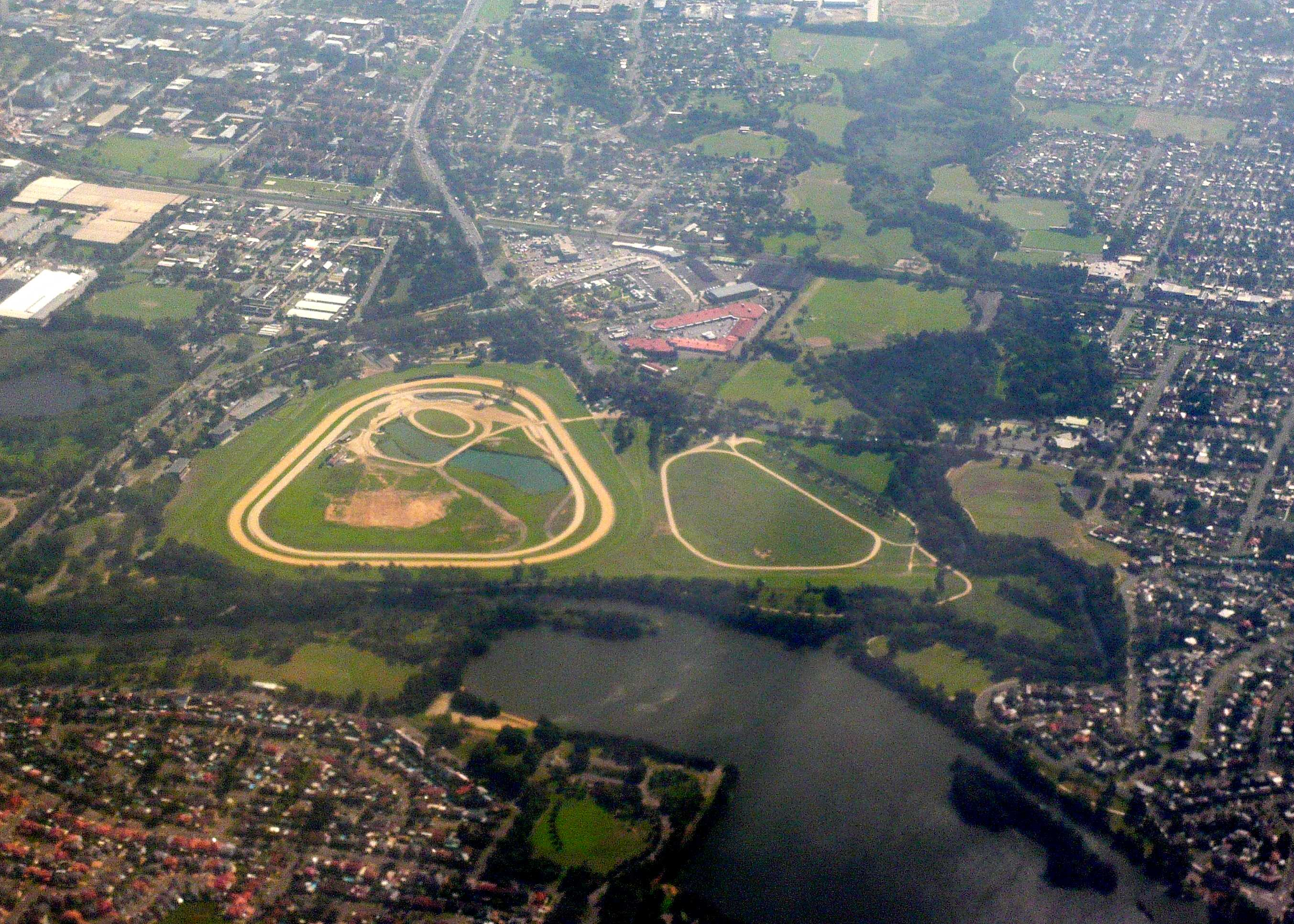
- Warwick Farm Racecourse from above
- Interactive map of Warwick Farm Racecourse
- Location: Warwick Farm, New South Wales, Australia
- Coordinates: 33°54′39″S 150°56′43″E
- Owned by: Australian Turf Club
- Date opened: 1889

Warwick Farm Racecourse is a racecourse at Warwick Farm, a south-west suburb of Sydney, New South Wales, Australia. It is used as a racecourse for Thoroughbred horse racing. The racecourse is owned and operated by the Australian Turf Club.

== History ==
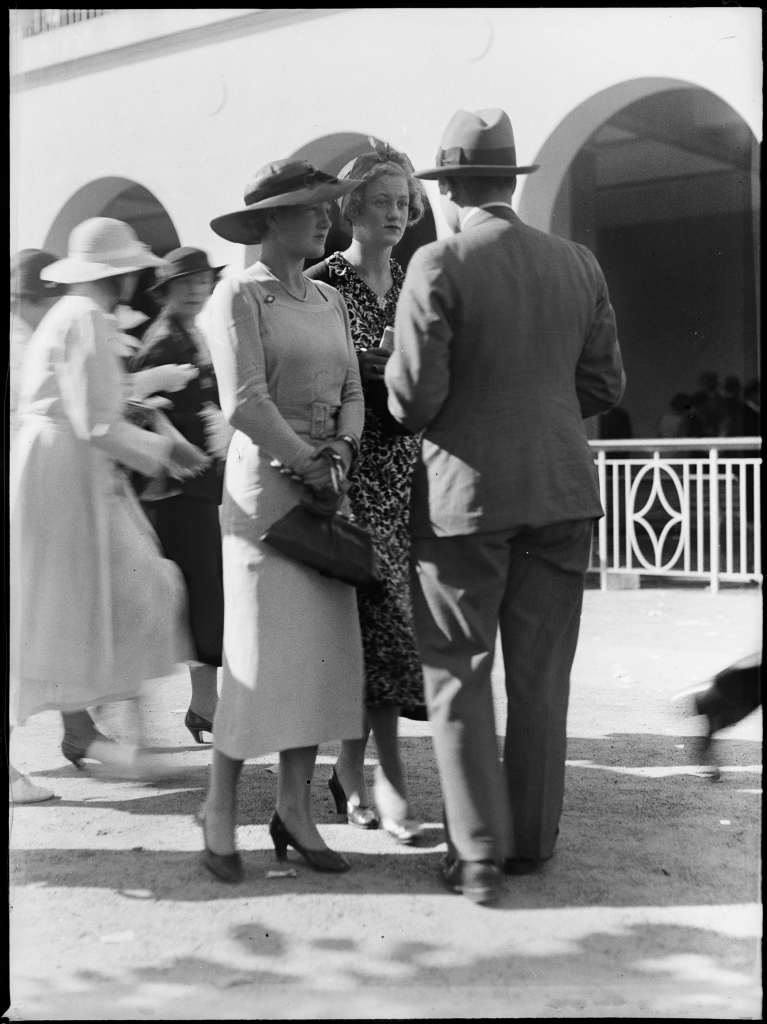
Racegoers at Warwick Farm racecourse from the Tom Lennon collection, courtesy of the Powerhouse Museum

In the early 1880s William Alexander Long bought J.H. Stroud's Warwick Park grant north of Liverpool. By 1884 he had also developed his property across the river, Chipping Norton, building stables and tracks. Long lived at Chipping Norton until 1901 when the banks foreclosed on him. His most successful horse Grand Flaneur won the Melbourne Cup in 1880.

He sold the Warwick Park estate in 1882 to William Forrester, who changed the name to Warwick Farm to match his initials. He became one of the most successful trainers of his time and in 1889 he and Edwin Oatley were the principals in the formation of the Warwick Farm Racing Club. Forrester owned two Melbourne Cup winners, Gaulus in 1897 and The Grafter in 1898. Forrester died almost destitute not long after his last winner The Watch Dog, won the Ellesmere Stakes at Randwick Racecourse in 1901.

Early in the twentieth century the racecourse was owned by Oatley who died in 1920. His son, Cecil, was the Manager of the property for a number of years, until 1924. Another son, Percy, was Secretary of the Warwick Farm Racing Club from 1906 until 1914. During World War II, the racecourse was utilised as a camp by Australian, American and British armed forces. The camp was known as Camp Warwick and also HMS Golden Hind. In 2018, the adjacent William Inglis Hotel opened as part of the Riverside Stables redevelopment. The hotel was purpose-built alongside the racecourse to support the adjoining thoroughbred sales complex and its visitors.

== Transport ==
Map of the former rail link

It is within close walking distance of Warwick Farm railway station. A free bus service between the racecourse and the station is available on race days. The racecourse was formerly served by a direct rail link off the Main South line north of Warwick Farm station. Race day special trains from North Sydney and the city were able to bring racegoers to the racecourse entrance. This 1.63 kilometre branch line was owned by the Australian Jockey Club and operated by CityRail and its predecessors. When the AJC decided not to fund maintenance of the line, it closed in August 1990.

== Motorsport ==
Warwick Farm Raceway was built within the horse racing facility and opened in 1960. It became a major track in the 1960s and hosted major events such as the Australian Grand Prix, Australian Touring Car Championship and Tasman Series. It hosted the Australian Grand Prix on four occasions in 1963, 1967, 1970 & 1971. In the early 1970s it conducted a round of the South Pacific Series for Production cars. The last major race at Warwick Farm was the final round of the 1973 Australian Touring Car Championship on 15 July and the circuit closed in August.
